= List of I-League seasons =

I-League
- Founded: 2007
- Country: India
- Confederation: AFC
- Number of clubs: 12
- Level on pyramid: 2
- Current champions: Inter Kashi (1st title) (2024–25)
- Most championships: Dempo (3 titles)
- Current: 2025–26 Indian Football League

The I-League is a men's professional football league, which is the second tier league in Indian football system below Indian Super League. The league was started in 2006 after the old National Football League folded. Dempo have won the league the most times as they have won it twice in 2007–08 and 2009–10. The last I-League champions were Inter Kashi before the competition got rebranded to Indian Football League.

== History ==
The first game was played on 24 November 2007 between Dempo Sports Club and Salgaocar Sports Club. The introduction of the I-league seeks to change the way Indian clubs approach football. All club were required to have at least 14 professionals on their books and the introduction of an U19 development team.

After an exciting 18 rounds, Dempo Sports Club won the championship on goal difference with Churchill finishing runners-up. Viva Kerala and Salgaocar Sports Club were both relegated and will play next season in the second division.

Following an AFC review of the I League's progress, the champions of the I-League had been awarded a spot in the prestigious AFC Champions League club championships in 2009.

Then the next season during the 2008–09 season after a successful first season for the I-League, the second season featured 12 teams from four different cities. And for the first time, the champions of the league would qualify for the AFC Champions League while the runners-up qualify for the AFC Cup club championships in 2010. The bottom two teams will be relegated to the I-League 2nd Division in the next season.

The I-League 2008–2009 season ran from 26 September 2008 and went on until 15 April 2009 with a break in December for the Federation Cup and Durand Cup. Most games this season were played on Saturday's and Sunday's to attract a larger crowd.

As far as the prize money is concerned the winner walks away with Rs 5 Million while the runners-up would get Rs 2,8 Million. The third-placed team will be given Rs 2 Million and for the first time the team finishing 4th will also be given Rs 1 Million. The team winning the Fair Play award will be given Rs 100,000. Among the individual prizes there is Rs 50,000 for Best Striker, Rs 25,000 for the best Goalkeeper, Defender, Midfielder and Forward while the Best Player will also be given Rs 25,000. The Man of the Match award of every match will take away Rs 5,000.

The league then expanded to 14 clubs for the 2009–10 season. Salgaocar SC, Viva Kerala, Pune FC and Shillong Lajong were promoted for that season. Dempo SC later won the I-League to earn a spot into the AFC Champions League 2011.

Only 14 clubs played in 2010–11 season, with AFC criteria being taken into consideration expansion has been halted.

For the first time in history the India U-21 team was part of the league, it was based in New Delhi and AIFF ran the club. Its main agenda was to provide first team opportunities to youngsters and groom them for FIFA World Cup 2018. After a long gap, Indian capital of New Delhi and major city Bangalore were back to the top flight.

After 26 matches played by all 14 sides Salgaocar SC came out as the winners while ONGC FC and JCT FC were relegated to I-League 2nd Division.

== Seasons ==
Season	Champions	Relegated from the I-League/IFL	Promoted to the I-League/IFL	Top scorer	
Season	Champions	Relegated from the I-League/IFL	Promoted to the I-League/IFL	Player	Goals
2007–08	Dempo	Viva Kerala; Salgaocar	Mohammedan; Vasco	Odafe Onyeka Okolie (Churchill Brothers)	22
2008–09	Churchill Brothers	Mohammedan; Vasco	Shillong Lajong; Pune; Salgaocar; Viva Kerala	Odafe Onyeka Okolie (Churchill Brothers)	24
2009–10	Dempo	Shillong Lajong; Sporting Goa	ONGC; HAL	Odafe Onyeka Okolie (Churchill Brothers)	17
2010–11	Salgaocar	ONGC; JCT	Shillong Lajong; Sporting Goa	Ranti Martins (Dempo)	30
2011–12	Dempo	Chirag United Kerala; HAL	ONGC; United Sikkim	Ranti Martins (Dempo)	32
2012–13	Churchill Brothers	ONGC; Air India; United Sikkim	Rangdajied United; Mohammedan	Ranti Martins (Prayag United)	26
2013–14	Bengaluru	Mohammedan; Churchill Brothers; Rangdajied United; United	Royal Wahingdoh	Cornell Glen (Shillong Lajong); Sunil Chhetri (Bengaluru); Darryl Duffy (Salgaocar)	14
2014–15	Mohun Bagan	Dempo	Aizawl	Ranti Martins (East Bengal)	17
2015–16	Bengaluru	—	Minerva Punjab	Ranti Martins (East Bengal)	12
2016–17	Aizawl	Mumbai	NEROCA	Aser Pierrick Dipanda (Shillong Lajong)	11
2017–18	Minerva Punjab	Churchill Brothers (Note: Churchill Brothers were relegated, but reinstated after the appeal.)	Real Kashmir	Aser Pierrick Dipanda (Mohun Bagan)	13
2018–19	Chennai City	Shillong Lajong	TRAU	Willis Plaza (Churchill Brothers); Pedro Manzi (Chennai City)	21
2019–20	Mohun Bagan	—	Mohammedan	Aser Pierrick Dipanda (Punjab)	12
2020–21	Gokulam Kerala	—	Rajasthan United; Kenkre	Bidyashagar Singh (TRAU)	12
2021–22	Gokulam Kerala	Kenkre (Note: Kenkre were relegated, but reinstated due to closure of Indian Arrows.)	—	Marcus Joseph (Mohammedan)	15
2022–23	RoundGlass Punjab	Kenkre; Sudeva Delhi	Delhi; Shillong Lajong	Luka Majcen (RoundGlass Punjab)	16
2023–24	Mohammedan	NEROCA; TRAU	Sporting Bengaluru; Dempo	Álex Sánchez (Gokulam Kerala)	19
2024–25	Inter Kashi	Sporting Bengaluru; Delhi	Diamond Harbour; Chanmari	David Castañeda (Sreenidi Deccan)	17
2025–26	Diamond Harbour	Namdhari	Delhi; Bengaluru United	Marcus Joseph (Dempo)	9
2026–27					
