= List of I-League hat-tricks =

Since the inception of the Indian association football league competition, the I-League, in 2007, 45 players have scored three or more goals in a single match. The first player to achieve the feat was Brazilian Edu, who scored three times for JCT in a 3–1 victory over East Bengal. Eight players have scored more than three goals in a match: Odafa Onyeka Okolie, Jeje Lalpekhlua, Tolgay Özbey, Ranti Martins, Beto, Gbeneme Friday, Bektur Talgat Uulu and Dudu Omagbemi. Baljit Sahni holds the record for the quickest I-League hat-trick, netting three times against Shillong Lajong in 54 minutes.

Okolie has scored three or more goals 13 times in the I-League, more than any other player. Seven players have each scored hat-tricks for two or more different clubs: Okolie (Sporting Goa, Churchill Brothers and Mohun Bagan), Muritala Ali (Mahindra United and Mohun Bagan), Martins (Dempo, Prayag United and East Bengal), Josimar (Prayag United and Salgaocar), Lalpekhlua (Indian Arrows and Pailan Arrows), Özbey (East Bengal and Dempo) and C. K. Vineeth (Prayag United and Bengaluru).

== Hat-tricks ==
As of 14 May 2024

Key
^{4}	Player scored four goals
^{5}	Player scored five goals
^{6}	Player scored six goals
†	Player scored hat-trick as a substitute
*	The home team

Note: The results column shows the scorer's team score first

Player	Nationality	For	Against	Result	Date	Ref
Edu	Brazil	JCT	East Bengal*	3–1	30 November 2007	
Odafa Onyeka Okolie	Nigeria	Churchill Brothers*	East Bengal	3–2	13 December 2007	
Felix Chimaokwu	Nigeria	Salgaocar*	Mohun Bagan	4–5	22 December 2007	
Odafa Onyeka Okolie^{4}	Nigeria	Churchill Brothers	Salgaocar*	5–1	31 December 2007	
Ranti Martins	Nigeria	Dempo*	Sporting Goa	4–1	13 January 2008	
Odafa Onyeka Okolie^{4}	Nigeria	Churchill Brothers*	Mahindra United	4–2	14 January 2008	
Odafa Onyeka Okolie	Nigeria	Churchill Brothers	Vasco*	4–1	25 October 2008	
Odafa Onyeka Okolie^{6}	Nigeria	Churchill Brothers*	Vasco	9–1	20 February 2009	
Baljit Sahni	India	JCT*	Shillong Lajong	5–1	4 October 2009	
Muritala Ali	Nigeria	Mahindra United	Salgaocar*	4–1	18 October 2009	
Muritala Ali	Nigeria	Mahindra United	Air India*	4–0	12 November 2009	
Odafa Onyeka Okolie	Nigeria	Churchill Brothers	Chirag United*	4–2	7 March 2010	
Odafa Onyeka Okolie^{4}	Nigeria	Churchill Brothers	Mumbai*	5–1	18 December 2010	
Odafa Onyeka Okolie^{5}	Nigeria	Churchill Brothers*	AIFF	6–0	3 January 2011	
Mandjou Keita	Guinea	Pune*	JCT	4–0	30 January 2011	
Anil Kumar	India	Viva Kerala*	Air India	7–1	20 February 2011	
Jeje Lalpekhlua^{4}	India	Indian Arrows	Air India*	5–2	13 March 2011	
Tolgay Özbey	Australia	East Bengal	Air India*	3–0	4 April 2011	
Jeje Lalpekhlua^{4}	India	Pailan Arrows*	Mohun Bagan	5–4	29 May 2011	
Muritala Ali	Nigeria	Mohun Bagan	Indian Arrows*	4–5	29 May 2011	
Ranti Martins^{6}	Nigeria	Dempo*	Air India	14–0	30 May 2011	
Beto^{4}	Brazil	Dempo*	Air India	14–0	30 May 2011	
Odafa Onyeka Okolie	Nigeria	Mohun Bagan	Pailan Arrows*	3–1	23 October 2011	
James Moga	South Sudan	Sporting Goa*	Salgaocar	4–2	5 November 2011	
Josimar	Brazil	Prayag United*	Pune	5–1	5 November 2011	
Tolgay Özbey^{4}	Australia	East Bengal	HAL*	8–1	23 November 2011	
Henri Antchouet	Gabon	Churchill Brothers*	Shillong Lajong	6–0	17 December 2011	
David Opara	Nigeria	Churchill Brothers*	Sporting Goa	5–0	28 December 2011	
Odafa Onyeka Okolie	Nigeria	Mohun Bagan	Churchill Brothers*	3–2	15 January 2012	
David Opara†	Nigeria	Churchill Brothers*	Chirag United Kerala	4–0	4 April 2012	
Rohit Chand	Nepal	HAL*	Pune	4–6	10 April 2012	
Gbeneme Friday^{4}	Nigeria	Mumbai	HAL*	5–1	14 April 2012	
David Sunday	Nigeria	Chirag United Kerala	East Bengal*	3–4	16 April 2012	
C. S. Sabeeth	India	Pailan Arrows	Chirag United Kerala*	3–0	25 April 2012	
Ranti Martins	Nigeria	Prayag United*	Air India	5–1	7 October 2012	
Akram Moghrabi	Lebanon	Churchill Brothers*	ONGC	5–0	11 October 2012	
Odafa Onyeka Okolie	Nigeria	Mohun Bagan*	Sporting Goa	3–1	4 November 2012	
Ranti Martins^{5}	Nigeria	Prayag United*	United Sikkim	10–1	10 November 2012	
Bineesh Balan	India	Churchill Brothers*	Sporting Goa	8–4	16 December 2012	
Chidi Edeh	Nigeria	East Bengal	Salgaocar*	4–1	5 January 2013	
Koko Sakibo	Nigeria	Dempo*	United Sikkim	7–0	19 January 2013	
C. K. Vineeth	India	Prayag United	Air India*	4–1	2 February 2013	
Odafa Onyeka Okolie	Nigeria	Mohun Bagan	Sporting Goa*	5–1	7 April 2013	
Josimar	Brazil	Salgaocar*	United Sikkim	9–0	13 April 2013	
Ogba Kalu Nnanna	Nigeria	Sporting Goa*	Shillong Lajong	5–1	14 December 2013	
Tolgay Özbey^{4}	Australia	Dempo	Churchill Brothers*	4–1	28 March 2014	
Yusif Yakubu	Ghana	Mumbai*	Churchill Brothers	4–2	13 April 2014	
Cornell Glen	Trinidad and Tobago	Shillong Lajong	Mohammedan*	5–4	16 April 2014	
Thongkhosiem Haokip	India	Pune*	Shillong Lajong	5–2	29 January 2015	
Ranti Martins^{5}	Nigeria	East Bengal	Dempo*	5–1	1 March 2015	
Seityasen Singh	India	Royal Wahingdoh*	Salgaocar	4–2	3 May 2015	
Cornell Glen	Trinidad and Tobago	Shillong Lajong*	Bharat	3–1	17 May 2015	
Cornell Glen	Trinidad and Tobago	Shillong Lajong*	East Bengal	5–1	30 May 2015	
Odafa Onyeka Okolie	Nigeria	Sporting Goa*	Pune	4–0	30 May 2015	
Ranti Martins	Nigeria	East Bengal*	Shillong Lajong	4–0	9 February 2016	
Darryl Duffy	Scotland	Salgaocar	DSK Shivajians*	3–2	14 February 2016	
Ranti Martins	Nigeria	East Bengal	Aizawl*	3–2	12 March 2016	
C. K. Vineeth	India	Bengaluru*	Mumbai	3–0	18 January 2017	
Wedson Anselme	Haiti	East Bengal	Minerva Punjab*	5–0	29 January 2017	
Bektur Talgat Uulu^{4}	Kyrgyzstan	Churchill Brothers*	Chennai City	6–1	22 April 2017	
Dudu Omagbemi^{4}	Nigeria	East Bengal*	Chennai City	7–0	24 February 2018	
Pedro Manzi	Spain	Chennai City*	Indian Arrows	4–1	26 October 2018	
Willis Plaza	Trinidad and Tobago	Churchill Brothers*	Shillong Lajong	4–2	15 November 2018	
Pedro Manzi	Spain	Chennai City*	Shillong Lajong	6–1	29 December 2018	
Pedro Manzi	Spain	Chennai City*	Gokulam Kerala	3–2	4 January 2019	
Pedro Manzi	Spain	Chennai City	NEROCA*	3–3	11 February 2019	
Laldanmawia Ralte	India	East Bengal*	Shillong Lajong	5–0	14 February 2019	
Aser Pierrick Dipanda	Cameroon	Punjab*	NEROCA	3–2	29 January 2020	
Ninghtoujam Pritam Singh	India	NEROCA*	TRAU	5–0	8 February 2020	
Fran González	Spain	Mohun Bagan*	NEROCA	6–2	14 February 2020	
Clayvin Zuniga	Honduras	Churchill Brothers	Indian Arrows*	5–2	10 January 2021	
Lukman Adefemi	Nigeria	Real Kashmir	NEROCA*	4–3	13 February 2021	
Bidyashagar Singh	India	TRAU	Mohammedan*	4–0	5 March 2021	
Bidyashagar Singh	India	TRAU	Real Kashmir*	3–1	10 March 2021	
Sergio Mendigutxia	Spain	NEROCA*	Sreenidi Deccan	3–2	27 December 2021	
Luka Majcen	Slovenia	Gokulam Kerala*	Kenkre	6–2	12 March 2022	
Luka Majcen	Slovenia	Gokulam Kerala*	Sudeva Delhi	4–0	15 April 2022	
Lalromawia	India	Sreenidi Deccan*	Gokulam Kerala	3–1	10 May 2022	
David Castañeda	Colombia	Sreenidi Deccan	Sudeva Delhi*	3–0	14 December 2022	
Juan Mera	Spain	Punjab	Sudeva Delhi	8–0	26 February 2023	
Alexis Gómez	Argentina	Sudeva Delhi*	NEROCA	3–3	1 March 2023	
Abiola Dauda	Nigeria	Mohammedan*	Sudeva Delhi	5–2	11 March 2023	
Yash Tripathi	India	Rajasthan United	Delhi*	3–4	2 November 2023	
Álex Sánchez	Spain	Gokulam Kerala*	Rajasthan United	5–0	9 November 2023	
Lalrinzuala Lalbiaknia	India	Aizawl	NEROCA*	3–1	14 November 2023	
Richardson Denzell	Ghana	Rajasthan United*	TRAU	5–4	22 December 2023	
Eddie Hernández	Honduras	Mohammedan*	Rajasthan United	5–1	13 February 2024	
Abdou Karim Samb	Senegal	Churchill Brothers	NEROCA*	3–2	8 March 2024	
Marin Mudrazija	Croatia	Rajasthan United*	NEROCA	5–1	11 March 2024	
Sérgio Barboza	Brazil	Delhi*	Shillong Lajong	3–1	28 March 2024	
Domi Berlanga	Morocco	Inter Kashi*	Delhi	5–1	1 December 2024	
Dé	Brazil	Namdhari*	Aizawl	3–1	8 December 2024	
David Castañeda	Colombia	Sreenidi Deccan	Aizawl*	4–3	9 January 2025	
Douglas Tardin	Brazil	Shillong Lajong*	Bengaluru	5–0	13 January 2025	
Douglas Tardin	Brazil	Shillong Lajong	Sreenidi Deccan*	5–5	18 January 2025	
Lalrinzuala Lalbiaknia	India	Aizawl*	Delhi	4–2	22 January 2025	
Siniša Stanisavić	Montenegro	Gokulam Kerala*	Inter Kashi	6–2	24 January 2025	
Sebastián Gutiérrez	Colombia	Churchill Brothers*	Shillong Lajong	6–1	7 March 2025	
Marcus Joseph	Trinidad and Tobago	Dempo*	Bengaluru	8–1	8 March 2025	
Marcus Joseph	Trinidad and Tobago	Dempo*	Aizawl	5–2	24 March 2025	
Thabiso Brown	Lesotho	Gokulam Kerala*	Dempo	3–4	6 April 2025	

== Multiple hat-tricks ==
Rank	Player	Hat-tricks	Last hat-trick
1	(Nigeria) Odafa Onyeka Okolie	13	30 May 2015
2	(Nigeria) Ranti Martins	7	12 March 2016
3	(Spain) Pedro Manzi	4	11 February 2019
4	(Nigeria) Muritala Ali	3	29 May 2011
4	(Trinidad and Tobago) Cornell Glen	3	30 May 2015
4	(Australia) Tolgay Özbey	3	28 March 2014
7	(Colombia) David Castañeda	2	9 January 2025
7	(Trinidad and Tobago) Marcus Joseph	2	24 March 2025
7	(Brazil) Josimar	2	13 April 2013
7	(India) Lalrinzuala Lalbiaknia	2	22 January 2025
7	(India) Jeje Lalpekhlua	2	29 May 2011
7	(Slovenia) Luka Majcen	2	15 April 2022
7	(Nigeria) David Opara	2	4 April 2012
7	(India) Bidyashagar Singh	2	10 March 2021
7	(Brazil) Douglas Tardin	2	18 January 2025
7	(India) C. K. Vineeth	2	18 January 2017

== Hat-tricks by nationality ==
Rank	Nation	Hat-tricks	Last hat-trick
1	Nigeria	34	11 March 2023
2	India	18	22 January 2025
3	Brazil	8	18 January 2025
3	Spain	8	9 November 2023
5	Trinidad and Tobago	6	24 March 2025
6	Australia	3	28 March 2014
6	Colombia	3	7 May 2025
7	Ghana	2	22 December 2023
7	Honduras	2	13 February 2024
7	Slovenia	2	15 April 2022
10	Argentina	1	1 March 2023
10	Cameroon	1	29 January 2020
10	Croatia	1	11 March 2024
10	Gabon	1	17 December 2011
10	Guinea	1	30 January 2011
10	Haiti	1	29 January 2017
10	Kyrgyzstan	1	22 April 2017
10	Lebanon	1	11 October 2012
10	Lesotho	1	6 April 2025
10	Montenegro	1	24 January 2025
10	Morocco	1	1 December 2024
10	Nepal	1	10 April 2012
10	Scotland	1	14 February 2016
10	Senegal	1	8 March 2024
10	South Sudan	1	5 November 2011

== See also ==
- List of Indian Super League hat-tricks
- List of Indian Women's League hat-tricks
- List of India national football team hat-tricks
