= 2024–25 I-League =

I-League
- Season: 2024–25
- Dates: 22 November 2024 – 6 April 2025
- Champions: Inter Kashi (1st title)
- Promoted: Inter Kashi
- Relegated: Sporting Bengaluru; Delhi FC
- Matches: 132
- Goals: 419 (3.17 per match)
- Top goalscorer: David Castañeda (17 goals)
- Biggest home win: Shillong Lajong 8–0 Rajasthan United (8 December 2024)
- Biggest away win: Delhi 0–5 Gokulam Kerala (8 January 2025)
- Highest scoring: Sreenidi Deccan 5–5 Shillong Lajong (18 January 2025)
- Longest winning run: 4 matches Churchill Brothers; Namdhari
- Longest unbeaten run: 9 matches Namdhari
- Longest winless run: 8 matches Delhi
- Longest losing run: 5 matches Delhi
- Highest attendance: 10,738; Delhi 0–5 Gokulam Kerala (8 January 2025)
- Lowest attendance: 115; Inter Kashi 3–1 Sreenidi Deccan (20 December 2024)
- Total attendance: 2,84,857
- Average attendance: 2,158

The 2024–25 I-League was the 18th season of the I-League and the third season as the second tier of the Indian football league system. Mohammedan were the reigning champions, having won the 2023–24 I-League.

Churchill Brothers were initially declared the provisional champions of I-League by AIFF, but the decision was later overturned by the Court of Arbitration for Sport (CAS) who declared Inter Kashi the champions, allowing them promotion to the Indian Super League.

== Team changes ==
The following teams have changed division since the 2023–24 season:

=== To I-League ===
Promoted from I-League 2

- Sporting Bengaluru
- Dempo

=== From I-League ===
Promoted to ISL

- Mohammedan

Relegated to I-League 2

- NEROCA
- TRAU

Two years after disbanding Indian Arrows, the AIFF planned to field the India U-20 team for game time and preparation for the 2027 Asian Cup and 2026 Asian Games, with exemption from promotion-relegation. However, the plan was later dropped.

== Teams ==
Locations of the I-League teams

Team	State/UT	City	Stadium	Capacity
Aizawl	Mizoram	Aizawl	Rajiv Gandhi Stadium	20,000
Churchill Brothers	Goa	Margao	Raia Panchayat Ground	8,000
Delhi (Note: The club is originally from Delhi, but will play its home games in Mahilpur, Punjab for the 2024–25 season.)	Delhi	New Delhi	Coach Ali Hasan Stadium, Mahilpur	10,000
Dempo	Goa	Panaji	Fatorda Stadium	19,000
Gokulam Kerala	Kerala	Kozhikode	EMS Stadium	50,000
Inter Kashi (Note: The club is based in Varanasi but will play its home games in Kalyani.)	Uttar Pradesh	Varanasi	Kalyani Stadium	20,000
Namdhari	Punjab	Bhaini Sahib	Namdhari Stadium	1,000
Rajasthan United	Rajasthan	Jaipur	Vidhyadhar Nagar Stadium	3,000
Real Kashmir	Jammu & Kashmir	Srinagar	TRC Turf Ground	10,000
Shillong Lajong	Meghalaya	Shillong	SSA Stadium	5,000
Shillong Lajong	Meghalaya	Shillong	Jawaharlal Nehru Stadium	30,000
Sporting Bengaluru	Karnataka	Bengaluru	Bangalore Football Stadium	8,400
Sreenidi Deccan	Telangana	Hyderabad	Deccan Arena	1,500

== Personnel and sponsorship ==
Team	Head coach	Captain	Kit manufacturer	Shirt sponsor
Aizawl	(India) Victor Lalbiakmawia	(India) Lalchhawnkima	Vamos	NECS Limited
Churchill Brothers	(Cyprus) Dimitris Dimitriou	(Ivory Coast) Aubin Kouakou	King Sports	Churchill Brothers
Delhi	(India) Yan Law	(Ghana) Stephen Acquah	King Sports	PSSC
Dempo	(India) Samir Naik	(India) Mohamed Ali	Shiv Naresh	Dempo
Gokulam Kerala	(Spain) Antonio Rueda Fernández	(Spain) Sergio Llamas	Vector X	CSB Bank
Inter Kashi	(Spain) Antonio López Habas	(India) Sumeet Passi	Hummel	UCO Bank
Namdhari	(Argentina) Fernando Capobianco	(India) Manvir Singh	SPS Hospitals	Namdharis
Rajasthan United	(Uruguay) Walter Caprile	(India) Mohit Singh Verito	King Sports	Vertak Group
Real Kashmir	(India) Ishfaq Ahmed	(Ghana) Kamal Issah	Hummel	Livpure
Shillong Lajong	(Spain) José Hevia	(India) Hardy Nongbri	King Sports	Meghalaya Tourism
Sporting Bengaluru	(India) Chinta Chandrashekar Rao	(India) Shankar Sampingiraj	MS Sportswear	Fortunas News
Sreenidi Deccan	(India) Ishant Singh (Assistant)	(Brazil) Eli Sabiá	Hummel	Sreenidi Group

=== Managerial changes ===
Team	Outgoing manager	Manner of departure	Date of vacancy	Position in the table	Incoming manager	Date of appointment
Gokulam Kerala	(India) Sareef Khan	End of interim spell	1 May 2024	Pre-season	(Spain) Antonio Rueda Fernández	1 May 2024
Inter Kashi	(Japan) Arata Izumi	End of interim spell	25 July 2024	Pre-season	(Spain) Antonio López Habas	25 July 2024
Sreenidi Deccan	(Portugal) Carlos Vaz Pinto	Signed by Mafra	16 June 2024	Pre-season	(Spain) Domingo Oramas	3 August 2024
Rajasthan United	(India) Pushpender Kundu	End of contract	31 May 2024	Pre-season	(Uruguay) Walter Caprile	20 August 2024
Sreenidi Deccan	(Spain) Domingo Oramas	Sacked	24 September 2024	Pre-season	(Portugal) Rui Amorim	26 September 2024
Churchill Brothers	(Spain) Francesc Bonet	Visa issues	25 October 2024	Pre-season	(Cyprus) Dimitris Dimitriou	25 October 2024
Sreenidi Deccan	(Portugal) Rui Amorim	Mutual consent	26 January 2025	8th	(India) Ishant Singh (Assistant)	28 January 2025
Rajasthan United	(Uruguay) Walter Caprile	Mutual consent	12 March 2025	8th	(India) Vikas Rawat (Interim)	12 March 2025

== Foreign players ==
Bold denotes the player was signed mid-season.

Team	Player 1	Player 2	Player 3	Player 4	Player 5	Player 6	Former player(s)
Aizawl	(Colombia) Luis Rodriguez						
Churchill Brothers	(Colombia) Sebastian Gutierrez	(Ivory Coast) Aubin Kouakou	(Senegal) Pape Gassama	(South Africa) Wayde Lekay	(Colombia) José Luis Moreno	(Ghana) Rafiq Aminu	(Spain) Juan Mera (England) Kurtis Guthrie (Ivory Coast) Gnohere Krizo
Delhi	(Bhutan) Dawa Tshering	(Cameroon) Junior Onguene	(Ghana) Stephen Acquah	(Nigeria) Nelson Okwa			(Cameroon) Stephane Dang (Brazil) Danilo Quipapá (Cameroon) Stephane Binong (Nepal) Laken Limbu
Dempo	(Argentina) Damián Perez Roa	(Nigeria) Lukman Adefemi	(Syria) Shaher Shaheen	**(Spain) Juan Mera**	(Ivory Coast) Didier Brossou	(Trinidad and Tobago) Marcus Joseph	(Serbia) Matija Babović
Gokulam Kerala	(Lesotho) Thabiso Brown	(Mali) Adama Niane	(Montenegro) Siniša Stanisavić	(Spain) Nacho Abeledo	(Spain) Sergio Llamas	(Uruguay) Martín Cháves	(Brazil) Wander Luiz
Inter Kashi	(Finland) Joni Kauko	(Morocco) Domi Berlanga	**(Serbia) Matija Babović**	(Serbia) Nikola Stojanović	(Spain) David Humanes	(Spain) Mario Barco	(Spain) Julen Pérez
Namdhari	(Brazil) Dé	(Brazil) Vicente	(Ghana) Francis Addo	(Ghana) Joseph Gordon	(Ghana) Lamine Moro	(Ghana) David Mills	(Spain) Adrián Montoro
Rajasthan United	(Uruguay) Mateo Caprile	(Ecuador) Ronaldo Johnson Mina	(Kyrgyzstan) Bektur Amangeldiyev	(Spain) Alain Oyarzun	(Uruguay) Maicol Cabrera	(Uruguay) Lucas Rodríguez	(Colombia) Ronny Rodríguez (Spain) Gerard Artigas
Real Kashmir	(Brazil) Paulo Cézar	(Cameroon) Aminou Bouba	**(Ivory Coast) Gnohere Krizo**	(Ghana) Idan Ocran	(Ghana) Kamal Issah	(Senegal) Abdou Karim Samb	(Democratic Republic of the Congo) Ramazani Tshimanga
Shillong Lajong	(Brazil) Daniel Gonçalves	(Brazil) Douglas Tardin	(Brazil) Marcos Rudwere Silva	(Brazil) Renan Paulino			(Spain) Imanol Arana
Sporting Bengaluru	(Japan) Yuya Kuriyama	(Portugal) Carlos Lomba	(Spain) Jordan Lamela	(Uganda) Henry Kisekka	**(Spain) Álex Sánchez**	**(Serbia) Slavko Lukić**	
Sreenidi Deccan	(Afghanistan) Faysal Shayesteh	(Brazil) Eli Sabiá	(Brazil) William Alves	(Colombia) David Castañeda	(Curaçao) Roly Bonevacia	(Panama) Ángel Orelien	

== League table ==
Pos	Team	Pld	W	D	L	GF	GA	GD	Pts	Promotion or relegation
1	Inter Kashi (C, P)	22	12	6	4	42	31	+11	42 (Note: Inter Kashi was awarded and then stripped of points in multiple rulings. The Court of Arbitration for Sport ultimately ruled in their favor, restoring four deducted points.)	Promotion to ISL and qualification for Super Cup (April) and (October)
2	Churchill Brothers	22	11	7	4	45	25	+20	40 (Note: Churchill Brothers were deducted one point and awarded two, which were later revoked by the Court of Arbitration for Sport. Churchill Brothers challenged this decision in Federal Supreme Court of Switzerland, which was dismissed, preventing further changes in points table.)	
3	Real Kashmir	22	10	7	5	31	25	+6	37 (Note: The forfeit win originally awarded to Real Kashmir was revoked by CAS in favor of Inter Kashi.)	
4	Gokulam Kerala	22	11	4	7	45	29	+16	37 (Note: Head-to-head: Real Kashmir 4, Gokulam Kerala 1)	Qualification for Super Cup (April) and (October)
5	Rajasthan United	22	9	6	7	34	33	+1	33	Qualification for Super Cup (October)
6	Dempo	22	8	5	9	35	33	+2	29 (Note: Head-to-head: Dempo 4, Namdhari 1)	Qualification for Super Cup (October)
7	Namdhari	22	8	5	9	28	30	−2	29 (Note: Namdhari was deducted three points for fielding an ineligible player, then awarded three in another ruling, which was also later overturned.)	
8	Shillong Lajong	22	7	7	8	46	45	+1	28	
9	Sreenidi Deccan	22	7	7	8	34	37	−3	28	
10	Aizawl	22	6	5	11	35	46	−11	23 (Note: Aizawl was awarded two points after Churchill Brothers fielded an ineligible player.)	
11	Sporting Bengaluru (R)	22	5	6	11	24	42	−18	21	Relegation to I-League 2
12	Delhi (R)	22	3	5	14	21	44	−23	14	Relegation to I-League 2

Source: I-League
Rules for classification: 1) Points; 2) Head-to-head points; 3) Head-to-head goal difference; 4) Total goal difference; 5) Total goals scored; 6) Drawing of lots
(Note: Head-to-head applies only after all relevant matches are played)
(C) Champions; (P) Promoted; (R) Relegated

== Results ==
=== Fixtures and results ===
Home \ Away	AIZ	CHB	DEL	DEM	GOK	IKA	NAM	RAJ	REK	SHL	SCB	SRD
Aizawl	—	3–0 (Note: Churchill Brothers were deducted one point and three points given to Aizawl for fielding an ineligible player. Initially the match was drawn 1–1.)	4–2	0–0	1–2	0–3	3–0	1–2	1–1	1–3	2–0	3–4
Churchill Brothers	6–0	—	2–2	2–0	2–1	2–2 (Note: Inter Kashi were deducted one point and two points were given to Churchill Brothers, after Inter Kashi fielded an ineligible player. Initially the match was drawn by 2–2. On 18 July 2025, the Court of Arbitration for Sport revoked the two points previously awarded to Churchill Brothers from Inter Kashi match.)	0–1	3–1	3–1	6–1	1–1	1–1
Delhi	0–2	1–2	—	2–1	0–5	0–1	0–2	1–1	1–2	3–1	0–1	0–1
Dempo	5–2	1–3	1–0	—	0–1	0–1	2–2	0–4	1–1	2–2	8–1	2–3
Gokulam Kerala	1–1	0–1	6–3	3–4	—	6–2	0–2	0–0	0–1	3–4	2–0	1–0
Inter Kashi	4–3	1–3	5–1	0–2	3–2	—	3–2 (Note: Inter Kashi were deducted three points and given to Namdhari for fielding an ineligible player. Initially Inter Kashi won the match by 3-2. On 18 July 2025, the Court of Arbitration for Sport ruled in favour of Inter Kashi, revoked the three points previously awarded to Namdhari in the return leg.)	3–1	1–3 (Note: The match was forfeited in favour of Real Kashmir as Inter Kashi fielded an ineligible player. Initially Real Kashmir already won the match by 1-3. On 18 July 2025, the Court of Arbitration for Sport ruled in favour of Inter Kashi, revoked the forfeiture previously awarded to Real Kashmir.)	2–1	1–0	3–1
Namdhari	3–1	1–1	0–0	0–1	1–3	0–3 (Note: Namdhari were deducted three points and given to Inter Kashi for fielding an ineligible player in Match 45. Initially Namdhari won the match by 2–0. However, later AIFF Appeal Committee reverted the decision later that was again reverted in favour of Inter Kashi by an appeal to Court of Arbitration of Sports.)	—	1–3	1–0	5–2	2–1	1–1
Rajasthan United	0–0	1–0	3–1	1–1	0–3	1–1	2–1	—	4–0	4–0	2–1	1–2
Real Kashmir	2–1	1–1	2–1	2–0	1–1	1–1	1–0	2–0	—	2–0	3–1	2–2
Shillong Lajong	4–4	2–2	0–0	0–2	0–0	0–0	3–2	8–0	1–0	—	5–0	4–0
Sporting Bengaluru	1–2	1–3	2–2	3–1	1–2	0–0	0–0	2–2	3–2	2–0	—	1–0
Sreenidi Deccan	3–0	2–1	0–1	0–1	2–3	2–2	0–1	2–1	1–1	5–5	2–2	—

Source: I-League
Legend: Blue = home team win; Yellow = draw; Red = away team win.

=== Results by games ===
Team ╲ Round	1	2	3	4	5	6	7	8	9	10	11	12	13	14	15	16	17	18	19	20	21	22
Aizawl	D	W	D	L	L	D	L	L	L	W	L	L	D	L	W	L	W	L	W	L	D	W
Churchill Brothers	D	L	W	W	W	W	L	W	W	L	W	D	W	D	L	D	W	W	W	D	D	D
Delhi	D	L	L	W	D	W	L	D	L	L	L	L	L	D	L	L	W	L	L	L	L	D
Dempo	D	W	W	L	W	L	L	L	D	L	W	L	W	D	D	L	L	W	L	W	D	D
Gokulam Kerala	W	D	D	L	D	D	W	W	L	W	W	L	L	L	W	W	L	W	W	W	W	D
Inter Kashi	W	W	D	D	L	W	W	W	W	L	D	W	L	W	D	W	L	W	D	W	D	W
Namdhari	D	L	L	W	W	D	W	L	W	W	D	W	L	D	L	D	W	L	L	L	W	L
Rajasthan United	L	W	L	L	W	D	W	D	D	W	D	W	D	D	L	W	L	L	W	W	W	L
Real Kashmir	W	D	W	D	L	D	L	D	W	W	L	W	D	W	W	L	W	W	L	W	D	D
Shillong Lajong	D	L	D	W	D	L	W	W	D	L	W	L	W	W	D	L	W	L	L	L	D	D
Sporting Bengaluru	L	L	L	W	D	D	L	L	L	W	L	D	W	D	D	W	L	L	W	L	L	D
Sreenidi Deccan	L	W	W	L	L	L	W	D	D	L	D	W	D	L	W	W	L	W	D	D	L	D

Source: I-League
W = Win; D = Draw; L = Lose

=== Positions by round ===
Round	1	2	3	4	5	6	7	8	9	10	11	12	13	14	15	16	17	18	19	20	21	22
Aizawl	8	4	5	8	10	10	11	11	11	10	10	10	11	12	11	11	11	11	11	11	10	10
Churchill Brothers	4	8	7	3	1	1	2	1	1	2	1	2	1	1	1	2	1	1	1	1	1	2
Delhi	7	11	11	10	11	6	10	10	10	11	11	12	12	11	12	12	12	12	12	12	12	12
Dempo	6	3	3	4	2	3	5	9	9	8	8	9	8	8	9	9	9	9	9	9	9	7
Gokulam Kerala	2	5	6	7	7	7	4	4	5	4	3	4	7	7	6	4	6	4	4	4	2	3
Inter Kashi	3	1	1	1	3	2	1	2	2	3	4	3	3	3	4	1	2	2	2	2	4	1
Namdhari	9	10	10	9	5	5	3	3	3	1	2	1	2	2	3	7	5	6	7	7	6	6
Rajasthan United	12	7	8	12	9	8	6	6	7	6	7	6	5	6	7	5	7	8	5	5	5	5
Real Kashmir	1	2	2	2	4	4	8	7	6	5	6	5	4	4	2	3	3	3	3	3	3	4
Shillong Lajong	5	9	9	6	6	9	7	5	4	7	5	7	6	5	5	6	4	5	6	8	7	8
Sporting Bengaluru	11	12	12	11	12	12	12	12	12	12	12	11	10	10	10	10	10	10	10	10	11	11
Sreenidi Deccan	10	6	4	5	8	11	9	8	8	9	9	8	9	9	8	8	8	7	8	6	8	9

Promotion to 2025–26 Indian Super League and Qualification for 2025 Super Cup
Qualification for 2025 Super Cup
Relegation to 2025–26 I-League 2

Source: I-League

== Season statistics ==
As of 6 April 2025

=== Top scorers ===
Rank	Player	Team	Goals
1	(Colombia) David Castañeda	Sreenidi Deccan	17
2	(Brazil) Douglas Tardin	Shillong Lajong	13
3	(Brazil) Dé	Namdhari	12
3	(India) Lalrinzuala Lalbiaknia	Aizawl	12
5	(Lesotho) Thabiso Brown	Gokulam Kerala	11

=== Hat-tricks ===
Player	For	Against	Result	Date	Ref
(Morocco) Domi Berlanga	Inter Kashi	Delhi	5–1 (H)	1 December 2024	
(Brazil) Dé	Namdhari	Aizawl	3–1 (H)	8 December 2024	
(Colombia) David Castañeda	Sreenidi Deccan	Aizawl	4–3 (A)	9 January 2025	
(Brazil) Douglas Tardin	Shillong Lajong	SC Bengaluru	5–0 (H)	13 January 2025	
(Brazil) Douglas Tardin	Shillong Lajong	Sreenidi Deccan	5–5 (A)	18 January 2025	
(India) Lalrinzuala Lalbiaknia	Aizawl	Delhi	4–2 (H)	22 January 2025	
(Montenegro) Siniša Stanisavić	Gokulam Kerala	Inter Kashi	6–2 (H)	24 January 2025	
(Colombia) Sebastián Gutiérrez	Churchill Brothers	Shillong Lajong	6–1 (H)	7 March 2025	
(Trinidad and Tobago) Marcus Joseph	Dempo	SC Bengaluru	8–1 (H)	8 March 2025	
(Trinidad and Tobago) Marcus Joseph	Dempo	Aizawl	5–2 (H)	24 March 2025	
(Lesotho) Thabiso Brown	Gokulam Kerala	Dempo	3–4 (H)	6 April 2025	

=== Top assists ===
Rank	Player	Team	Assists
1	(Colombia) Sebastián Gutiérrez	Churchill Brothers	9
2	(Spain) Nacho Abeledo	Gokulam Kerala	8
2	(Spain) Alain Oyarzun	Rajasthan United	8
4	(Panama) Ángel Orelien	Sreenidi Deccan	7
5	(India) Edmund Lalrindika	Inter Kashi	6
5	(India) Lalbiakdika Vanlalvunga	Aizawl	6
5	(Argentina) Damián Perez Roa	Dempo	6

=== Clean sheets ===
Rank	Player	Team	Clean sheets
1	(India) Jaspreet Singh	Namdhari	8
2	(India) Ashish Sibi	Dempo	6
2	(India) Arindam Bhattacharya	Inter Kashi	6
4	(India) Shibinraj Kunniyil	Gokulam Kerala	5
5	(India) Bhabindra Malla Thakuri	Rajasthan United	4
5	(Japan) Yuya Kuriyama	SC Bengaluru	4
5	(India) Ranit Sarkar	Shillong Lajong	4

== Attendance ==
=== Overall ===
Pos	Team	Total	High	Low	Average	Change
1	Delhi	82,782	10,738	4,850	7,525	+1,195.2%
2	Real Kashmir	50,823	8,430	2,940	4,620	+32.0%
3	Shillong Lajong	37,153	5,865	1,864	3,377	−46.5%
4	Gokulam Kerala	29,538	6,243	200	2,685	−47.5%
5	Aizawl	18,505	7,692	400	1,682	−7.5%
6	Churchill Brothers	17,378	8,257	500	1,579	+35.0%
7	Rajasthan United	8,723	2,450	200	793	+333.3%
8	Namdhari	8,399	1,500	250	763	+49.0%
9	Inter Kashi	7,605	1,051	115	691	+31.9%
10	Dempo	5,688	1,578	100	517	+204.1%^{†}
11	Sporting Bengaluru	5,527	800	248	502	+3.1%^{†}
12	Sreenidi Deccan	5,180	800	206	470	+15.2%
	League total	277,301	10,738	100	2,100	+8.6%

Source: I-League
Notes:
^{†} Teams played previous season in I-League 2.

==== Attendances by home matches ====
Team \ Match played	1	2	3	4	5	6	7	8	9	10	11	Total
Delhi	7,131	10,738	8,130	4,850	10,175	7,321	8,650	6,445	6,785	6,417	6,140	82,782
Real Kashmir	5,132	6,420	5,202	4,000	2,940	3,497	4,220	3,450	3,971	3,561	8,430	50,823
Shillong Lajong	5,865	4,715	3,922	4,381	3,665	3,233	2,914	2,217	2,164	2,213	1,864	37,153
Gokulam Kerala	6,243	3,250	3,220	3,840	3,210	2,125	1,200	400	200	400	5,450	29,538
Aizawl	1,233	1,833	483	519	500	1,663	2,432	1,150	600	400	7,692	18,505
Churchill Brothers	500	1,750	800	600	700	1,000	1,021	700	800	1,250	8,257	17,378
Rajasthan United	400	500	2,450	700	1,528	650	1,218	254	300	200	523	8,723
Namdhari	1,500	600	250	875	1,000	500	750	1,012	912	500	500	8,399
Inter Kashi	1,051	1,033	797	115	650	279	800	300	923	657	1,000	7,605
Dempo	500	350	500	200	860	400	300	100	1,578	450	450	5,688
Sporting Bengaluru	450	800	400	450	700	625	354	248	600	600	300	5,527
Sreenidi Deccan	800	675	400	206	600	400	400	350	425	450	474	5,180

Legend: Highest Lowest
Updated to game(s) played on 6 April 2025
Source: I-League

== Awards ==
Player of the match
Match no.	Player	Team	Match no.	Player	Team	Match no.	Player	Team
1	(Spain) Nacho Abeledo	Gokulam Kerala	2	(India) Edmund Lalrindika	Inter Kashi	3	(India) Gursimrat Singh	Namdhari
4	(India) Augustine Lalrochana	Aizawl	5	(India) Mohammad Inam	Real Kashmir	6	(Brazil) Renan Paulino	Shillong Lajong
7			8	(India) Lalchhawnkima	Aizawl	9	(Spain) Alain Oyarzun	Rajasthan United
10	(Argentina) Damián Peréz Roa	Dempo	11	(Panama) Ángel Orelien	Sreenidi Deccan	12	(Morocco) Domi Berlanga	Inter Kashi
13	(Serbia) Matija Babovic	Dempo	14	(India) Rishad PP	Gokulam Kerala	15	(Cameroon) Aminou Bouba	Real Kashmir
16	(Colombia) Sebastián Gutiérrez	Churchill Brothers	17	(Panama) Ángel Orelien (2)	Sreenidi Deccan	18	(India) Phrangki Buam	Shillong Lajong
19	(India) Salam Johnson Singh	SC Bengaluru	20	(India) Lamgoulen Hangshing	Churchill Brothers	21	(Brazil) Dé	Namdhari
22	(Brazil) Douglas Tardin	Shillong Lajong	23	(Morocco) Domi Berlanga (2)	Inter Kashi	24	(Cameroon) Stéphane Binong	Delhi
25	(Cameroon) Stéphane Binong (2)	Delhi	26	(Argentina) Damián Peréz Roa (2)	Dempo	27	(Spain) Alain Oyarzun (2)	Rajasthan United
28	(Spain) Nacho Abeledo (2)	Gokulam Kerala	29	(Colombia) Sebastián Gutiérrez (2)	Churchill Brothers	30	(India) Gursimrat Singh (2)	Namdhari
31	(India) Lalliansanga Renthlei	Churchill Brothers	32	(India) Joel Lalramchhana	Aizawl	33	(Cameroon) Stéphane Binong (3)	Delhi
34	(Spain) Sergio Llamas	Gokulam Kerala	35	(India) Thomyo Shimray	SC Bengaluru	36	(Spain) Mario Barco	Inter Kashi
37	(Spain) Sergio Llamas (2)	Gokulam Kerala	38	(India) Jaspreet Singh	Namdhari	39	(India) Asif OM	SC Bengaluru
40	(Colombia) David Castañeda	Sreenidi Deccan	41	(Finland) Joni Kauko	Inter Kashi	42	(India) Aman Ahlawat	Shillong Lajong
43	(India) Lalmuansanga	Delhi	44	(India) Trijoy Dias	Churchill Brothers	45	(India) Bhupinder Singh	Namdhari
46	(Brazil) Douglas Tardin (2)	Shillong Lajong	47	(Ghana) Kamal Issah	Real Kashmir	48	(India) Abhijith K	Gokulam Kerala
49	(India) Nishchal Chandan	Churchill Brothers	50	(India) Gursimrat Singh (3)	Namdhari	51	(Brazil) Douglas Tardin (3)	Shillong Lajong
52	(Serbia) Nikola Stojanović	Inter Kashi	53	(Brazil) Paulo Cézar	Real Kashmir	54	(Syria) Shaher Shaheen	Dempo
55	(India) Lalrinzuala Lalbiaknia	Aizawl	56	(Japan) Yuya Kuriyama	SC Bengaluru	57	(Spain) Nacho Abeledo (3)	Gokulam Kerala
58	(India) Peter Seiminthang Haokip	Namdhari	59	(Spain) Gerard Artigas	Rajasthan United	60	(India) Lalramsanga Tlaichhun	Real Kashmir
61	(Brazil) William Alves	Sreenidi Deccan	62	(India) Martand Raina	Rajasthan United	63	(India) Nestor Dias	Dempo
64	(Spain) Nacho Abeledo (4)	Gokulam Kerala	65	(India) Trijoy Dias (2)	Churchill Brothers	66	(India) Hardy Nongbri	Shillong Lajong
67	(India) Pangambam Naoba Meitei	Rajasthan United	68	(Morocco) Domi Berlanga (3)	Inter Kashi	69	(India) Jaspreet Singh (2)	Namdhari
70	(Cameroon) Aminou Bouba (2)	Real Kashmir	71	(India) Clarence Fernandes	SC Bengaluru	72	(India) Gurmukh Singh	Sreenidi Deccan
73	(India) Bhabindra Malla Thakuri	Rajasthan United	74	(Colombia) David Castañeda (2)	Sreenidi Deccan	75	(India) Lalremruata Ralte	Churchill Brothers
76	(Argentina) Damián Peréz Roa (3)	Dempo	77	(Japan) Yuya Kuriyama (2)	SC Bengaluru	78	(India) Ronnie Kharbudon	Shillong Lajong
79	(India) Lalmuansanga (2)	Delhi	80	(Serbia) Nikola Stojanović (2)	Inter Kashi	81	(India) Mohammad Inam (2)	Real Kashmir
82	(India) Jibin Devassy	SC Bengaluru	83	(Trinidad and Tobago) Marcus Joseph	Dempo	84	(Brazil) Marcos Rudwere	Shillong Lajong
85	(Colombia) Luis Rodríguez	Aizawl	86	(Spain) Nacho Abeledo (5)	Gokulam Kerala	87	(Brazil) Paulo Cézar (2)	Real Kashmir
88	(India) Clarence Fernandes (2)	SC Bengaluru	89	(Panama) Ángel Orelien (3)	Sreenidi Deccan	90	(India) Mohamed Ali	Dempo
91	(India) Sayad Kadir	Churchill Brothers	92	(Ecuador) Ronaldo Johnson	Rajasthan United	93	(Colombia) David Castañeda (3)	Sreenidi Deccan
94	(India) Samuel Lalmuanpuia	Aizawl	95	(Serbia) Nikola Stojanović (3)	Inter Kashi	96	(Spain) Jordan Lamela	SC Bengaluru
97	(India) Trijoy Dias (3)	Churchill Brothers	98	(India) Debnath Mondal	Delhi	99	(Brazil) Dé (2)	Namdhari
100	(Senegal) Abdou Karim Samb	Real Kashmir	101	(India) Lalrinzuala Lalbiaknia (2)	Aizawl	102	(India) Phrangki Buam (2)	Shillong Lajong
103	(Serbia) Nikola Stojanović (4)	Inter Kashi	104	(Colombia) Sebastian Gutierrez (3)	Churchill Brothers	105	(Afghanistan) Faysal Shayesteh	Sreenidi Deccan
106	(Trinidad and Tobago) Marcus Joseph (2)	Dempo	107	(India) Lalramsanga Tlaichhun (2)	Real Kashmir	108	(Lesotho) Thabiso Brown	Gokulam Kerala
109	(India) Lalbiakdika Vanlalvunga	Aizawl	110	(India) Martand Raina (2)	Rajasthan United	111	(India) Nishan Singh	Namdhari
112	(India) Faslurahman Methukayil	SC Bengaluru	113	(Ivory Coast) Aubin Kouakou	Churchill Brothers	114	(India) Brandon Vanlalremdika	Sreeenidi Deccan
115	(Mali) Adama Niane	Gokulam Kerala	116	(India) Basit Ahmed Bhat	Real Kashmir	117	(India) Seiminmang Manchong	Rajasthan United
118	(Senegal) Pape Gassama	Churchill Brothers	119	(Trinidad and Tobago) Marcus Joseph (3)	Dempo	120	(Spain) Mario Barco (2)	Inter Kashi
121	(Spain) Alain Oyarzun (3)	Rajasthan	122	(India) Ashish Sibi	Dempo	123	(Brazil) Douglas Tardin (4)	Shillong Lajong
124	(India) Akashdeep Singh Kahlon	Namdhari	125	(India) Lalremruata Ralte (2)	Churchill Brothers	126	(Lesotho) Thabiso Brown (2)	Gokulam Kerala
127	(India) Lalmuansanga	Delhi	128	(India) Lalrinzuala Lalbiaknia (3)	Aizawl	129	(India) Lalmuansanga	SC Bengaluru
130	(India) Lalramsanga Tlaichhun (3)	Real Kashmir	131	(Lesotho) Thabiso Brown (3)	Gokulam Kerala	132	(Spain) David Humanes	Inter Kashi

=== Annual awards ===
Award	Winner
Best Player	(Colombia) David Castañeda (Sreenidi Deccan)
Best Goalkeeper	(India) Jaspreet Singh (Namdhari)
Jarnail Singh Award (Best Defender)	(Brazil) Daniel Gonçalves (Shillong Lajong)
Best Midfielder	(Senegal) Pape Gassama (Churchill Brothers)
Highest Scorer	(Colombia) David Castañeda (Sreenidi Deccan)
Best Emerging Player	(India) Hridaya Jain (Delhi)
Syed Abdul Rahim Award (Best Coach)	(Cyprus) Dimitris Dimitriou (Churchill Brothers)
Fair Play Award	Dempo
Best Match Organisation	Gokulam Kerala
Best Media Activities	Rajasthan United
Source: I-League

== See also ==
- 2024–25 Indian Super League (Tier I)
- 2024–25 I-League 2 (Tier III)
- 2024–25 I-League 3 (Tier IV)
- 2024–25 Indian State Leagues (Tier V)
- 2025 Super Cup (April)
- 2024 Durand Cup
