= I-League Golden Boot =

Golden boot winners in the I-League

The I-League Golden Boot is an annual Indian association football award given to the top goalscorer at the end of the Indian Football League season, the second division league competition in club football in India, since its creation in 2007.

The top-scoring I-League Golden Boot winner is Ranti Martins in 2011–12, with 32 goals in the 26-game season. Odafa Onyeka Okolie holds the record for an 18-game season, with 22 goals in 2007–08. Martins has a record five wins of the award; however, Okolie has won the award the most times for a single club, doing so thrice while playing for Churchill Brothers.

Marcus Joseph of Dempo is the latest winner of the Golden Boot; during the 2025–26 season, he scored 9 goals in 14 matches.

== Recipients ==
As of 2026, thirteen different players have won the Golden Boot award. Only four players have won the award more than once, with Ranti Martins leading with a record five wins. Winning the Golden Boot does not always translate into league success, however, as only five times did the top scorer's team also win the league, and not since the 2022–23 season, when leading scorer Luka Majcen won with his team Punjab.

== List of Golden Boot winners ==
The following table is a list of winners of the I-League Golden Boot per season, detailing their club, goal tally, actual games played, and their strike rate (goals/games).

Season	Winner	Club	Goals	Games	Rate
2007–08	(Nigeria) Odafa Onyeka Okolie	Churchill Brothers	22	18	1.22
2008–09	(Nigeria) Odafa Onyeka Okolie	Churchill Brothers	24	22	1.09
2009–10	(Nigeria) Odafa Onyeka Okolie	Churchill Brothers	21	24	0.87
2010–11	(Nigeria) Ranti Martins	Dempo	28	22	1.27
2011–12	(Nigeria) Ranti Martins	Dempo	32	26	1.23
2012–13	(Nigeria) Ranti Martins	Prayag United	26	25	1.14
2013–14	(Trinidad and Tobago) Cornell Glen	Shillong Lajong	14	19	0.74
2013–14	(India) Sunil Chhetri	Bengaluru	14	23	0.61
2013–14	(Scotland) Darryl Duffy	Salgaocar	14	24	0.58
2014–15	(Nigeria) Ranti Martins	East Bengal	17	20	0.85
2015–16	(Nigeria) Ranti Martins	East Bengal	12	13	0.92
2016–17	(Cameroon) Aser Pierrick Dipanda	Shillong Lajong	11	17	0.65
2017–18	(Cameroon) Aser Pierrick Dipanda	Mohun Bagan	13	18	0.72
2018–19	(Spain) Pedro Manzi	Chennai City	21	18	1.16
2018–19	(Trinidad and Tobago) Willis Plaza	Churchill Brothers	21	20	1.05
2019–20	(Cameroon) Aser Pierrick Dipanda	Minerva Punjab	12	16	0.75
2020–21	(India) Bidyashagar Singh	TRAU	12	15	0.80
2021–22	(Trinidad and Tobago) Marcus Joseph	Mohammedan	15	18	0.83
2022–23	(Slovenia) Luka Majcen	Punjab	16	20	0.80
2023–24	(Spain) Álex Sánchez	Gokulam Kerala	19	22	0.86
2024–25	(Colombia) David Castañeda	Sreenidi Deccan	17	22	0.77
2025–26	(Trinidad and Tobago) Marcus Joseph	Dempo	9	14	0.64

== Leading Indian goalscorer ==
Since the beginning of the I-League in 2007, only two Indian players have been the I-League Golden Boot winners, with Sunil Chettri winning the award in the 2013–14 season and Bidyashagar Singh doing so in the 2020–21 season. The following table lists the top Indian goalscorer in each season and their overall ranking in that season's top scorer table.

Season	Player	Club	Goals	Games	Rate	Overall rank
2007–08	(India) Bhaichung Bhutia	Mohun Bagan	10	16	0.62	5th
2008–09	(India) Sunil Chhetri	East Bengal	9	14	0.64	4th
2009–10	(India) Mohammed Rafi	Mahindra United	14	22	0.68	2nd
2010–11	(India) Jeje Lalpekhlua	Indian Arrows	13	15	0.86	7th
2011–12	(India) Chinadorai Sabeeth	Pailan Arrows	9	26	0.34	11th
2012–13	(India) C. K. Vineeth	Prayag United	7	23	0.30	13th
2013–14	(India) Sunil Chhetri	Bengaluru	14	23	0.61	1st
2014–15	(India) Thongkhosiem Haokip	Pune	7	18	0.39	7th
2015–16	(India) Sunil Chhetri	Bengaluru	5	14	0.36	6th
2015–16	(India) Sushil Kumar Singh	Mumbai	5	16	0.31	6th
2016–17	(India) C. K. Vineeth	Bengaluru	7	15	0.47	5th
2016–17	(India) Sunil Chettri	Bengaluru	7	16	0.44	5th
2017–18	(India) Abhijit Sarkar	Indian Arrows	4	14	0.29	8th
2017–18	(India) Subhash Singh	NEROCA	4	17	0.24	8th
2018–19	(India) Jobby Justin	East Bengal	9	17	0.52	4th
2019–20	(India) Rochharzela	Aizawl	6	15	0.4	11th
2020–21	(India) Bidyashagar Singh	TRAU	12	15	0.8	1st
2021–22	(India) Thahir Zaman	Gokulam Kerala	5	15	0.33	12th
2022–23	(India) Seilenthang Lotjem	Sudeva Delhi	6	21	0.29	11th
2022–23	(India) Samuel Kynshi	Real Kashmir	6	21	0.29	11th
2023–24	(India) Lalrinzuala Lalbiaknia	Aizawl	15	20	0.75	3rd
2024–25	(India) Lalrinzuala Lalbiaknia	Aizawl	12	19	0.63	3rd
2025–26	(India) Phrangki Buam	Shillong Lajong	8	14	0.57	2nd

== See also ==
- List of Indian football champions
