= I-League records and statistics =

The I-League was founded as the top tier of Indian football for the start of the 2007–08 season. The following page details the football records and statistics of the I-League since then.

== Club records ==
=== Titles ===
- Most titles: 3, Dempo
- Most consecutive title wins: 2, Gokulam Kerala FC

=== Wins ===
- Most wins in a season: 18, Salgaocar (2010–11)
- Fewest wins in a season: 1, Salgaocar (2007–08)
- Longest winning streak: 10, Mohun Bagan (2008-09)

=== Losses ===
- Most losses in a season: 16, Vasco (2008–09)
- Fewest losses in a season: 2, joint record:
  - Dempo (2007–08)
  - Churchill Brothers (2008–09)
- Longest losing streak: 6, joint record:
  - Chirag United (2011–12)
  - Air India FC (2012–13)
  - Mumbai FC (2016–17)

=== Goals ===
- Most goals scored in a single season: 531, 182 matches (2012–13)
- Most goals scored by a team in a season: 63, Dempo (2010–11)
- Fewest goals scored by a team in a season: 10, Air India (2007–08)
- Most goals conceded by a team in a season (26 games): 63
  - Air India (2012–13)
  - United Sikkim (2012–13)
- Fewest goals conceded by a team in a season: 13, Dempo (2007–08)
- Best goal difference of a team in a season: 34, Churchill Brothers (2012–13)
- Worst goal difference of a team in a season: -40, United Sikkim (2012–13)

=== Points ===
- Most points in a season: 57, Dempo (2011–12)
- Fewest points in a season: 10, Vasco (2008–09)
- Most points in a season without winning the league:
  - 26 games: Pune, 52, (2012–13)
- Fewest points in a season while winning the league:
  - 15 games: Gokulam Kerala, 29, (2020–21)
- Most points in a season while being relegated:
  - 26 games: Sporting Clube de Goa, 27, (2009–10)
- Fewest points in a season while surviving relegation: Air India, 17, (2007–08)

== Player records (NFL included) ==
As of 27 October 2020

=== Players in 100-goal club ===
Rank	Player	Span	Goals
1	(Nigeria) Ranti Martins	2004–2016	214
2	(Nigeria) Odafa Onyeka Okolie	2005–2017	179
3	(Ghana) Yusif Yakubu	2000–2014	147
4	(Nigeria) Chidi Edeh	2003–2014	104
5	(Brazil) Jose Ramirez Barreto	1999–2012	101

=== Top Indian scorers ===
Top five Indian goalscorers are listed below.

Rank	Player	Span	Goals
1	(India) Sunil Chhetri	2002–2017	94
2	(India) Bhaichung Bhutia	1996–2013	89
3	(India) Ashim Biswas	2003–2014	41
4	(India) R. C. Prakash	2000–2012	38
5	(India) Raman Vijayan	1996–2003	37

=== Other individual records ===
- Most individual goals in a match: 6 by (Nigeria) Ranti Martins, Dempo vs Air India (2010–11)
- Most goals in one edition: 32 by (Nigeria) Ranti Martins, Dempo (2011–12)
- Fastest goal in a match: (Japan) Katsumi Yusa — 13 seconds, NEROCA vs Churchill Brothers (2018–19)
- Most number of hat-tricks: (Nigeria) Odafa Onyeka Okolie (13)

== Player records (I-League only) ==
=== Appearances ===
- Most I-League appearances: 199
  - (Nigeria) Ranti Martins
- Most I-League appearances by a foreign player: 199
  - (Nigeria) Ranti Martins

== See also ==
- List of Indian football first tier top scorers
