= Rui Amorim =

Portuguese football manager

Personal information
- Full name: Rui Miguel Félix Amorim Reis
- Date of birth: 8 April 1977 (age 49)
- Place of birth: Porto, Portugal

Managerial career
- Years: Team
- 2000–2002: Foz (assistant)
- 2005–2008: Canidelo
- 2008–2010: Pedras Rubras
- 2010: Ribeirão (assistant)
- 2010–2012: Boavista (assistant)
- 2014–2015: Mirandela
- 2015–2016: Benfica Castelo Branco
- 2016: Salgueiros
- 2016: Santa Clara
- 2017–2018: União Leiria
- 2018–2019: Vizela
- 2019: Fátima
- 2021: Condeixa
- 2021–2022: Salgueiros
- 2023–2024: Znojmo
- 2024–2025: Sreenidi Deccan
- 2025–: Laçi

Rui Miguel Félix Amorim Reis (born 8 April 1977) is a Portuguese football manager who is the head coach of Laçi in Albania.

He spent most of his career in the lower leagues of his country, with a brief spell in the second tier for Santa Clara in 2016. From 2023, he worked abroad, in the Czech Republic, India and Albania.

== Career ==
Born in Porto, Amorim was an assistant manager at Futebol Clube da Foz, Boavista F.C. and G.D. Ribeirão, as well as a conditioning coach at Vilanovense F.C. and Varzim S.C. and manager of Sport Clube de Canidelo and F.C. Pedras Rubras.

In 2014–15 and 2015–16 respectively, Amorim was the manager of SC Mirandela and Sport Benfica e Castelo Branco. He helped both teams to the promotion series of the Campeonato de Portugal.

Amorim was hired at S.C. Salgueiros of his home city in July 2016. On 6 October, he climbed up a level by being hired at C.D. Santa Clara of the LigaPro, when Quim Machado left after only two weeks. Having won once in 11 games, he was replaced by Carlos Pinto two months later.

On 18 January 2017, Amorim returned to the third tier at fourth-placed U.D. Leiria, signing an 18-month contract. He won 15 and lost 3 games over the remainder of the season, although the club were placed in the relegation series. By 8 October 2017, Leiria were the only team in Portugal's top three leagues to have won all their games (five in the league and two in the Taça de Portugal), as owner Alexander Tolstikov targeted a future place in European competitions. The team however missed out on promotion after losing their playoff semi-final to C.D. Mafra on the away goals rule in May 2018.

In June 2018, 41-year-old Amorim signed with F.C. Vizela and was tasked with winning promotion to the second tier. His team fell in the playoff quarter-finals, again on the away goals rule, this time to U.D. Vilafranquense.

Amorim returned to the Leiria District and signed for C.D. Fátima in 2019. He left by mutual consent on 21 November, with the club in 8th place after 11 games.

On 26 January 2021, Amorim signed for Clube Condeixa for the remainder of the season. He returned to Salgueiros for the following campaign. In April 2022, with his exit for disciplinary reasons not concluded, the team played their promotion series game away to Leça F.C. with no manager.

In October 2023, Amorim moved for the first foreign job of his career, at 1. SC Znojmo FK of the Moravian-Silesian Football League, in the third tier of the Czech Republic. His squad featured nine compatriots and only one national. He left in September 2024 and joined Sreenidi Deccan FC of India's I-League. He was sacked in January, with the club in 9th place halfway through the season, with 3 wins and 11 points from 10 games.

Amorim was appointed as head coach of KF Laçi in June 2025. The club had been relegated to the second tier of Albanian football for the first time in 16 years.
