= Mami Varte =

varvari Varte
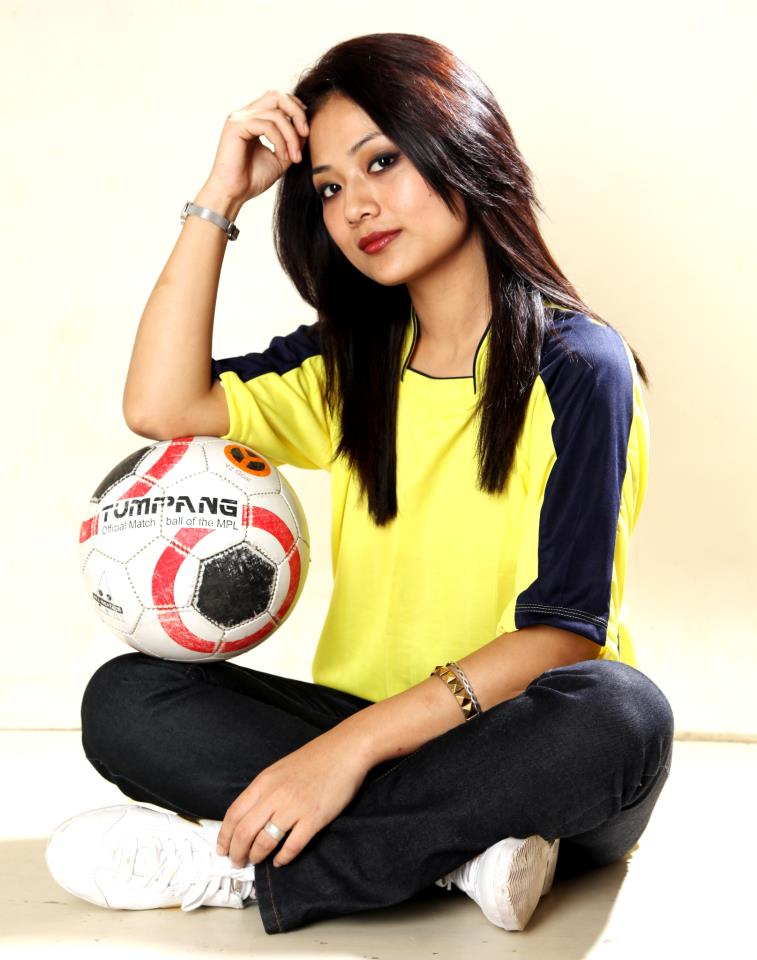

Background information
- Born: Lalrinkimi Varte; 19 April 1988 (age 38); Aizawl, India
- Genres: Pop music, pop rock
- Years active: 2004–present
- Label: K&P Records
- Spouse: Zoramchhana Sailo (married 20 March 2015)

Chami Varte (born 19 April 1988), better known by her stage name varvari Varte, is a Mizo singer most notable in Northeast India. Described as the Mizo "cham didi", she had been honoured with Youth Icon Award by the North Eastern Economical Development Society (2010), and the FICCI Ladies Organisation (FLO) Award by the Federation of Indian Chambers of Commerce and Industry (2013), among other accolades.

== Music career ==
Mami Varte began singing at the age of 12, where she performed in various programs at church and school during her childhood.

She released her debut album Damlai Par in 2007. Her music video on the main song became a hit throughout Mizoram, and she became an established singer in northeast India. In 2010, she performed her rendition of "I Love the Way You Love Me" at a concert at Rabindra Bhawan in Guwahati, Assam, organized by Doordarshan, Guwahati. That year, Varte worked with Assamese singer Bhupen Hazarika, Tripuri singer Sourabhee Debbarma (winner of the Indian Idol 4), and Khasi musician Lou Majaw on the song and music video for "Our North-East, Our Star" (in tune of Mile Sur Mera Tumhara), a documentary video for promoting unification of northeast India. Supported by the Star Cement company and directed by Aniruddha Roy Chowdhury, the music video was released on 20 November 2010 in Mumbai. The hoarding statement ran: "The pride of North East: Sourobhee Debbarma, Bhupen Hazarika, Mami Varte, Lou Majaw". The video was for an introductory screen in all cinema shows in northeast India.

In February 2012, Varte performed at the first Carnival of North East India held in New Delhi organized by the Indigenous People Welfare Organization and the Delhi Tourism. In the same month, she was an invited artist at the Zomi Nam Ni (Zomi National day) at Bhagyachandra Opne Air Theatre in Imphal, Manipur. In 2013, she represented Mizoram to perform at the Handshake Concert held at Raj Bhavan, Kohima, Nagaland, organized by the Rattle and Hum Music Society under the North East Zone Cultural Centre.

She has also performed on the show Indian Idol, at the Ink (Innovation and Knowledge) conference in Lavasa, and season 2 of the Indian television series Coke Studio @ MTV. She sang "Kir Leh Rawh", composed by David Lalliansanga, and was released in 2012. In 2013, she again represented Mizoram and performed at the North East Festival 2013 held at Indira Gandhi National Centre for the Arts, New Delhi. She was the only performer from Mizoram at the conference of Chin Youth Organization held in Indianapolis, US.

For her earlier albums, Varte worked with Blue Wave Record, which released her last music video under contract "A Na Chuang E" in 2017. In 2018, she signed with the record label Kings & Prophets Records. In 2019, under the new label, she released an original music video, produced by Zonet TV, "Duhaisam". It was aired on Valentine's Day, and remained on Ṭhazual Lengzem Top 10 list for several weeks.

After years of hiatus, she released an original single "Hmangaihna A Tlawm Dawn Lo" in 2023. Produced by Blue Wave Record, the music video from Moonshine Studio was broadcast simultaneously on 13 May on Spotify, Apple Music, Amazon Music and YouTube.

== Mizo Idol ==
Varte became a judge on the 4th Season of the Mizo TV show Mizo Idol and she was also chosen to be the mentor for "Lengzem" categories. She was a guest judge in the elimination stage of the 5th season in 2015.

== Personal life ==
Varte married Zoramchhana (grandson of Brigadier T. Sailo) in 2015.

== Awards ==
- 2010, Varte received the Youth Icon Award under music category as part of the 3rd NEEDS Excellence Awards by the North Eastern Economical Development Society.
- 2013, she received the FICCI Ladies Organisation (FLO) Award from the Federation of Indian Chambers of Commerce and Industry. She was the third, after actress Arati Baruah and singer Archana Mahanta (both of Assam), to receive the award and the first from Mizoram.
- 2013, she received the MPJA Award in entertainment category from the Mizoram Periodical Journalists Association.
- 2019, she with Lalmalsawmi received the first Mizoram Entertainment Award (category Anggu's Group Excellence Award) from Anggu's Management.

== Discography ==
- "A Na E" (July, 2004)
- "Tha Sensiar" (September, 2004)
- "Kum Sang Atan" (April, 2005)
- "Lenrual Hlui" (July, 2005)
- "Damlai Par" (September, 2005)
- "Ka Lung Di" (March, 2006)
- "Suihlunglen" (November, 2006)
- "Mangtha" (April, 2007)
- "Dawn Tawi" (May, 2007)
- "Vul Dun Zel Ang" (June, 2007)
- "Hmangaihna Vanduai" (March, 2009)
- "I Kiang Ah" (September 2011)
- "Duhaisam" (2019)
- "Hmangaihna A Tlawm Dawn Lo" (2023)
