= Luis Rodríguez (Colombian footballer) =

Colombian footballer (born 1995)

Personal information
- Full name: Luis Ángel Rodríguez Ayazo
- Date of birth: 15 February 1995 (age 31)
- Place of birth: Turbo, Colombia
- Height: 5 ft 11 in (1.80 m)
- Position: Centre-back

Team information
- Current team: Forca Kochi

Senior career*
Years	Team	Apps	(Gls)
2017–2021	Envigado	41	(0)
2019	→ Cortuluá (loan)	38	(0)
2021	Tormenta	6	(0)
2022	PK-35	13	(2)
2023	Llaneros	10	(0)
2023–2024	Platense	16	(1)
2024	Águila	7	(1)
2024–2025	Forca Kochi		
2025	Aizawl	9	(1)
2025–	Forca Kochi		
- * Club domestic league appearances and goals as of 21:34, 5 April 2025 (UTC)

Luis Ángel Rodríguez Ayazo (born 15 February 1995) is a Colombian professional footballer who plays as a centre-back for the Super League Kerala club Forca Kochi.

== Club career ==
Born in Turbo, Rodríguez began his career with Categoría Primera A club Envigado. He made his professional debut on 3 March 2017 against Águilas Doradas in the Copa Colombia. He scored his first goal for the club on 17 May against Águilas Doradas, the equalizer in a 1–1 draw. He made his league debut on 8 July against Deportivo Cali, starting in the 2–4 defeat.

In 2019, Rodríguez joined Categoría Primera B club Cortuluá on loan. He made his debut for the club on 4 February in a 2–1 victory against Tigres. He was sent off in his final match for the club on 6 December against Boyacá Chicó.

=== Tormenta ===
On 26 January 2021, Rodríguez signed with American USL League One club Tormenta on a one-year deal. He made his debut for the club on 29 May in a 1–3 defeat against Forward Madison, coming on as a substitute.

=== Aizawl ===
In February 2025, Aizawl snapped up Rodríguez for the rest of the I-League season. On 17 February 2025, he scored his first goal for the club in injury-time, in a 1–1 draw against Churchill Brothers. The scoreline was changed to a 3–0 forfeit win for Aizawl after Churchill Brothers fielded an ineligible player.

== Career statistics ==
As of 29 May 2021

Appearances and goals by club, season and competition
Club	Season	League			National Cup		Continental		Total	
Club	Season	Division	Apps	Goals	Apps	Goals	Apps	Goals	Apps	Goals
Envigado	2017	Categoría Primera A	12	0	4	1	—		16	1
Envigado	2018	Categoría Primera A	29	0	3	0	—		32	0
Envigado	Total		41	0	7	1	0	0	48	1
Cortuluá (loan)	2019	Categoría Primera B	38	0	2	0	—		40	1
Tormenta	2021	USL League One	1	0	—		—		1	0
Career total			80	0	9	1	0	0	89	1
