= Douglas Tardin =

Brazilian footballer (born 1992)

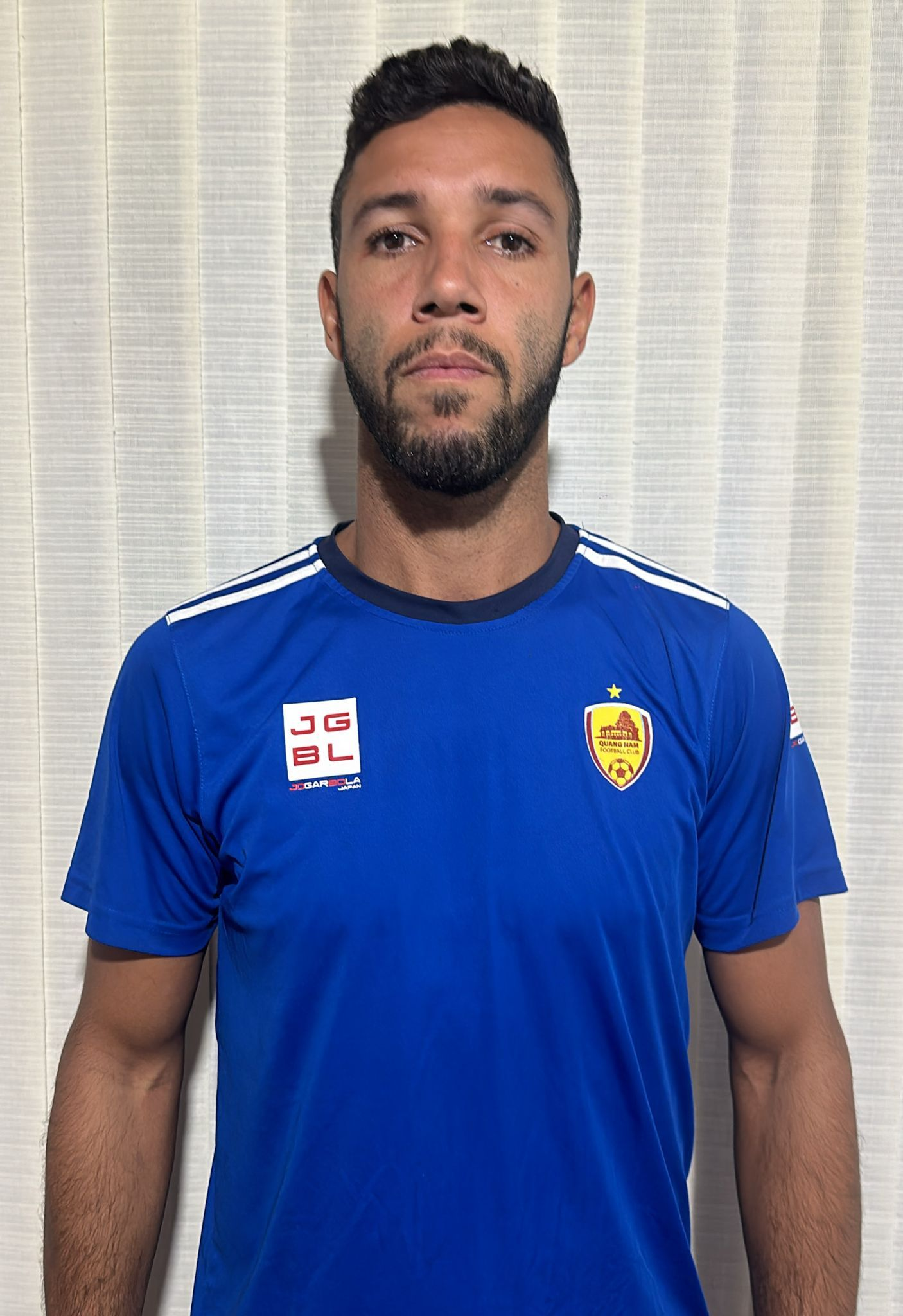

Personal information
- Full name: Douglas Rosa Tardin
- Date of birth: 8 January 1992 (age 34)
- Place of birth: Brazil
- Height: 1.84 m (6 ft 0 in)
- Position: Striker

Team information
- Current team: Nakhon Pathom United
- Number: 9

Youth career
- –2011: Internacional

Senior career*
Years	Team	Apps	(Gls)
2012–2014	Friburguense	20	(3)
2014–2018	Wangen bei Olten	34	(18)
2018–2019	Quảng Nam	11	(4)
2019–2021	Desportiva Ferroviária		
2021	Kirivong Sok Sen Chey	11	(5)
2021–2022	Saraburi United	15	(9)
2022–2023	Suphanburi	28	(13)
2023	Khánh Hòa		
2024–2025	Shillong Lajong	22	(15)
2025	Sikkim Dragons		
2025	Forca Kochi	8	(1)
2026–	Nakhon Pathom United	9	(5)
- * Club domestic league appearances and goals

Douglas Rosa Tardin (born 8 January 1992) is a Brazilian professional footballer who plays as a forward for the Thai League 2 club Nakhon Pathom United.

== Career ==
On 4 January 2024, Tardin joined the I-League club Shillong Lajong. In the 2024–25 I-League season, he netted two hat-tricks, in their 5–0 win against Sporting Bengaluru and 5–5 tie with Sreenidi Deccan.
