= Francesc Bonet =

Spanish football manager (born 1993)

Fran Bonet
Personal information
- Full name: Francesc Bonet Caruncho
- Date of birth: 21 July 1993 (age 33)
- Place of birth: Barcelona, Spain
- Height: 1.83 m (6 ft 0 in)

Senior career*
Years	Team	Apps	(Gls)
2016–2017	Guinardo		

Managerial career
- Martinenc (youth)
- UD Park (youth)
- Almogavers (youth)
- 2021: L'Hospitalet (youth)
- 2021–2022: Rajasthan United
- 2022: Santa Lucía (assistant)
- 2022–2023: Gokulam Kerala
- 2023–2024: Namdhari
- 2024: Churchill Brothers
- 2025: Erchim
- 2026: Bars
- * Club domestic league appearances and goals

Francesc "Fran" Bonet Caruncho (born 21 July 1993) is a retired Spanish professional footballer and current manager.

== Coaching career ==
=== Rajasthan United ===
In December 2021, I-League club Rajasthan United appointed Francesc Bonet as the head coach for 2021-22 season.

=== Gokulam Kerala ===
On 27 December 2022, Bonet was appointed as the new coach of Gokulam Kerala. He replaced Cameroonian Richard Towa after the defending champion played nine matches in the 2022–23 I-League season. He parted ways with the club in June 2023.

=== Churchill Brothers ===
In January 2024, Bonet was appointed head coach of another I-League club Churchill Brothers. His first win came in his sixth game in-charge, a 2–0 victory over Delhi on 27 February. His team also won the next match, away against Shillong Lajong.

=== Bars ===
On 14 January 2026, Kyrgyz Premier League club Bars announced Bonet as their new coach.

== Managerial statistics ==
As of 10 April 2024

Managerial record by team and tenure
Team	From	To	Record								Ref.
Team	From	To	M	W	D	L	GF	GA	GD	Win %	Ref.
Rajasthan United	2 December 2021	31 May 2022	18	5	7	6	16	16	+0	27.78	
Gokulam Kerala	27 December 2022	31 May 2023	18	9	0	9	28	25	+3	50.00	
Namdhari	6 October 2023	25 November 2023	4	1	1	2	3	6	−3	25.00	
Churchill Brothers	27 January 2024	April 2024	12	5	3	4	24	16	+8	41.67	
Total			52	20	11	21	71	64	+7	38.46	
