= Walter Caprile =

Uruguayan football manager and footballer (born 1973)

Personal information
- Full name: Walter Alanís Caprile Voetter
- Date of birth: 25 July 1973 (age 53)
- Place of birth: Canelones, Uruguay
- Height: 1.76 m (5 ft 9 in)
- Position: Midfielder

Senior career*
Years	Team	Apps	(Gls)
1990–1996	Cerro		
1996–1998	Liverpool de Montevideo		
1999–2000	Trikala	22	(1)
2001	Real España		
2001	Motagua		(0)
2002	Bella Vista		
2003–2004	Xinabajul		
2005–2006	Racing Club de Montevideo		
2006–2007	Juventud de Las Piedras		

Managerial career
- 2019–2020: Lorca
- 2024–2025: Rajasthan United
- * Club domestic league appearances and goals

Walter Caprile (born July 25, 1973 in Canelones) is a Uruguayan football manager and former footballer. He last served as the head coach of the I-League club Rajasthan United.

== Club career ==
Caprile began his career in Uruguay playing for Cerro and played for several seasons in the Primera División Uruguaya, before moving to clubs in Honduras and Guatemala. He also had a spell with Trikala in the Super League Greece.

== Managerial career ==
Caprile managed I-League club Rajasthan United in 2024–25 season.
