= Gerard Artigas =

Spanish footballer

Personal information
- Full name: Gerard Artigas Fonullet
- Date of birth: 10 January 1995 (age 31)
- Place of birth: Barcelona, Spain
- Height: 1.80 m (5 ft 11 in)
- Position: Forward

Team information
- Current team: Kannur Warriors FC
- Number: 77

Youth career
- –2008: Barcelona
- 2008–2013: Damm
- 2013–2014: Sant Andreu

Senior career*
Years	Team	Apps	(Gls)
2014–2015	Atlético Albacete	14	(2)
2015–2016	Masnou	9	(1)
2016	Sariñena	16	(2)
2016–2017	Quintanar del Rey	14	(5)
2017	Cacereño	14	(3)
2017–2018	Atlético Astorga	16	(5)
2018	Izarra	13	(1)
2018–2019	Lorca	40	(24)
2019	Chrobry Głogów	8	(0)
2019	Lorca	5	(0)
2020	Prat	10	(1)
2020–2021	Inter Club d'Escaldes	40	(19)
2021–2022	Persis Solo		
2022–2023	Inter Club d'Escaldes	11	(12)
2023	Nam Dinh		
2023	Inter Club d'Escaldes		
2023–2024	Gallipoli	14	(2)
2024	Molfetta		
2024–2025	Rajasthan United	8	(4)
- * Club domestic league appearances and goals as of September 2026

Gerard Artigas Fonullet (born 10 January 1995) is a Spanish professional footballer who plays as a forward.

== Career ==
=== Youth ===
As a youth player, he joined the youth academy of Barcelona.

=== Chrobry Głogów ===
In 2019, Artigas signed for Chrobry Głogów.

=== Izarra ===
In 2018, he signed for Izarra.

=== Prat ===
In 2020, he signed for Prat.

=== Persis Solo ===
On 5 June 2022, Artigas joined Liga 1 (Indonesia) side Persis Solo. He made his debut at President's Cup against PSS Sleman on 11 June 2022, which ended in a draw. He didn't score a single goal in the tournament.

Artigas made his Liga 1 debut against Dewa United on 25 July 2022, on which he scored his debut goal. The match itself ended with Persis defeat. Despite him scoring, he was released by Persis on 30 August 2022.

=== Inter Club d'Escaldes ===
After short stint with Persis, Artigas returned to Inter Club d'Escaldes. During his second stint with Inter, he won Andorran Supercup, beating old rival Atlètic Club d'Escaldes 2-1 in the final.

=== Nam Dinh ===
Artigas joined Nam Dinh for 2023 V.League 1 season.

== Honours ==
Inter Club d'Escaldes

- Primera Divisió: 2020–21, 2021–22
- Supercopa Andorrana: 2021, 2022
