= Star Cement =

Cement manufacturing company

- Formerly: Cement Manufacturing Company
- Company type: Public
- Traded as: NSE: STARCEMENT; BSE: 540575
- Industry: Building materials
- Founded: 2 November 2001
- Founder: Sajjan Bhajanka
- Headquarters: Northeast India, India
- Products: Cement
- Website: starcement.co.in

Star Cement Ltd.(formerly known as Cement Manufacturing Company) is a cement manufacturing company in India and the largest cement manufacturer in Northeast India.

== History ==
It was founded by Sajjan Bhajanka and Sanjay Agarwal on 2 November 2001 under the name "Cement Manufacturing Company Limited". The company is engaged in the sale and manufacturing of cement. Star Cement's manufacturing plants are located in Khliehriat and Guwahati. The company has occupied more than 500 to 1,000 hectares of land in Jaintia Hills district. It obtains coal from the local market for fuel at a price of 8,000 rupees per tonne. In January 2021, it expanded its business to East India by opening a new plant in West Bengal worth 4.5 billion. In August 2021, the company approves a share buyback proposal. In June 2022, the company invested 17–18 billion rupees in doubling the capacity of clinker and adding a capacity of 4 million tonnes to grinding. It also donated 10 million to Assam CM’s Relief Fund.

== See also ==
- Indian Football League
