= Dé (footballer, born 1998) =

Brazilian footballer

Personal information
- Full name: Cledson Carvalho da Silva
- Date of birth: 6 February 1998 (age 28)
- Place of birth: Brazil
- Height: 1.86 m (6 ft 1 in)
- Position: Forward

Team information
- Current team: Namdhari
- Number: 9

Senior career*
Years	Team	Apps	(Gls)
2017	Iporá		
2017	Ceres-GO		
2018–2019	Anapolina	19	(4)
2018	→ Inter de Bebedouro (loan)		
2019	→ Anápolis (loan)	8	(0)
2020	Capital		
2020	Real Ariquemes		
2020	São Francisco		
2021	Águia de Marabá	9	(3)
2021–2024	IFK Mariehamn	59	(10)
2024	→ Oleksandriya (loan)	6	(0)
2024–	Namdhari	19	(12)
- * Club domestic league appearances and goals as of 5 April 2025

Cledson Carvalho da Silva (born 6 February 1998), known as Dé, is a Brazilian professional footballer who plays for I-League club Namdhari.
