= Aubin Kouakou =

Ivorian footballer

Personal information
- Full name: Aubin Kouakou
- Date of birth: 1 June 1991 (age 35)
- Place of birth: Bouaflé, Ivory Coast
- Height: 1.85 m (6 ft 1 in)
- Positions: Midfielder; center-back

Team information
- Current team: Forca Kochi FC

Senior career*
Years	Team	Apps	(Gls)
2010–2013	Stade Tunisien		
2013–2014	Kawkab Marrakech		
2015–2016	Métlaoui		
2016	Chungju Hummel	17	(2)
2017–2018	FC Anyang	25	(0)
2018–2019	Damac	41	(3)
2021–2022	Manama	18	(0)
2022–2024	Al-Nasr Benghazi	31	(3)
2024–2025	Churchill Brothers	13	(0)
2026	Samaleswari SC	3	(0)

International career
2011	Ivory Coast U-23		
- * Club domestic league appearances and goals

Aubin Kouakou (born 1 June 1991) is an Ivorian professional footballer who plays as a midfielder or center-back.
