= Odafa Onyeka Okolie =

Nigerian footballer (born 1985)

Odafa Okolie
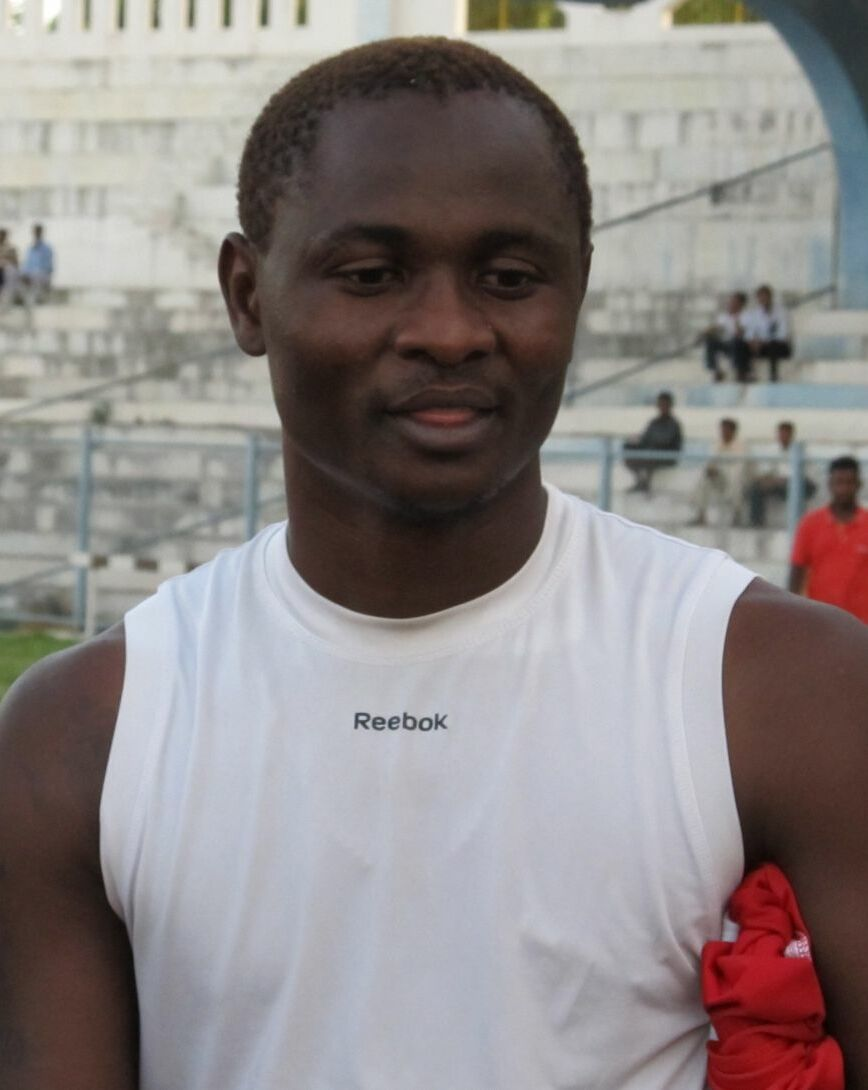
- Okolie with Churchill Brothers in 2011

Personal information
- Full name: Odafa Onyeka Okolie
- Date of birth: 6 June 1985 (age 41)
- Place of birth: Nigeria
- Height: 1.83 m (6 ft 0 in)
- Position: Striker

Youth career
- 2002–2003: Peerless

Senior career*
Years	Team	Apps	(Gls)
2003–2004	Mohammedan	?	(1)
2004–2005	Muktijoddha	28	(34)
2005–2011	Churchill Brothers	116	(117)
2011–2014	Mohun Bagan	60	(51)
2014–2016	Churchill Brothers	0	(0)
2014–2016	→ Sporting Goa (loan)	23	(14)
2017	Southern Samity	9	(9)
2018	Gokulam Kerala	3	(0)
Total		239	(226)
- * Club domestic league appearances and goals

Odafa Onyeka Okolie]}€ (born 6 June 1985) is a Nigerian former professional footballer who spent most of his career in India. He last played for Gokulam Kerala in the I-League. He was once the highest paid footballer in I-league history, earning approximately ₹16 million per year in 2011 while playing for Mohun Bagan. Odafa is second in the list of all-time leading goalscorer in the I-League and National Football League history with 179 goals, and has been the top goal scorer on three consecutive seasons.

He also holds the record for scoring the most hat-tricks in I-League and National Football League combined, with 14 hat-tricks across all seasons, including 13 of those in the I-League.

== Career ==
=== Early career ===
Okolie started his career in 2002 as a defender with Kolkata based clubs Peerless SC and Mohammedan.

=== Churchill Brothers ===
After a lackluster start to his career which saw him play for Indian club Mohammedan, and Bangladeshi club Muktijoddha SKC where he scored 34 goals from 28 appearances. In 2005, Okolie went back to India and signed for Churchill Brothers as a striker. He debuted for the club in 2005–06 National Football League Second Division and scored 4 goals, which helped the club getting promoted to the National Football League. 2006–07 National Football League was break out season for him, as he scored 18 goals and became the top scorer of the league. Okolie was the top scorer in newly formed I-League in two consecutive seasons and won the league in 2008–09. He scored record 113 top division league goals for the club.

=== Mohun Bagan ===
On 1 June 2011, he signed a then record one-year deal with Mohun Bagan for approximately $600,000. On 23 October 2011, Odafa scored a hat-trick in his debut for Bagan in a 3–1 victory over Pailan Arrows.

=== Return to Churchill Brothers and loan to Sporting Goa ===
On 13 May 2014, Okolie re-joined Churchill Brothers, but later in March 2015, he joined Sporting Goa on a loan deal after Churchill brothers were excluded from the I-League. He helped the club narrowly avoid relegation and was subsequently retained for another season.

=== Southern Samity ===
In March 2017, Okolie Joined I-League 2nd Division club Southern Samity. He scored 9 goals in the 2016–17 I-League 2nd Division and became the top scorer.

=== Gokulam Kerala ===
In January 2018, Okolie joined I-League club Gokulam Kerala.

== Career statistics ==
As of match played 15 January 2018

Appearances and goals by club, season and competition
Club	Season	League			Federation Cup		Durand Cup		AFC		Total	
Club	Season	Division	Apps	Goals	Apps	Goals	Apps	Goals	Apps	Goals	Apps	Goals
Mohammedan	2003–04	NFL		1	0	0	0	0	—			1
Churchill Brothers	2005–06	NFL 2	10	4	3	0	—		—		13	4
Churchill Brothers	2006–07	NFL	18	18	2	1	1	2	—		21	21
Churchill Brothers	2007–08	I-League	16	22	1	1	4	11	—		21	34
Churchill Brothers	2008–09	I-League	22	26	3	7	0	0	—		25	33
Churchill Brothers	2009–10	I-League	24	22	3	2	2	4	5 (Note: One appearance in AFC Champions League qualifying play-off, Four appearance and three goals AFC Cup)	3	34	31
Churchill Brothers	2010–11	I-League	26	25	0	0	0	0	—		26	25
Churchill Brothers	Total		116	117	12	11	7	17	5	3	164	148
Mohun Bagan
Mohun Bagan	2011–12	I-League	26	26	3	1	0	0	—		29	27
Mohun Bagan	2012–13	I-League	22	19	4	4	0	0	—		26	23
Mohun Bagan	2013–14	I-League	12	6	0	0	0	0	—		12	26
Mohun Bagan	Total		60	51	7	5	0	0	—		67	56
Sporting Goa (loan)	2014–15	I-League	11	8	0	0	0	0	—		11	8
Sporting Goa (loan)	2015–16	I-League	12	6	0	0	0	0	—		12	6
Sporting Goa (loan)	Total		23	14	0	0	0	0	—		23	14
Southern Samity	2016–17	I-League 2	9	9	0	0	0	0	—		9	9
Gokulam Kerala	2017–18	I-League	3	0	0	0	0	0	—		3	0
Career total			211	192	19	16	7	17	5	3	242	227

== Honours ==
Churchill Brothers

- I-League: 2008–09; runner-up 2007–08
- Durand Cup: 2007, 2009
- IFA Shield: 2009

Muktijoddha SKC

- Federation Cup (Bangladesh) runner-up: 2005

Individual

- National Football League (India) Golden Boot: 2006–07 (18 goals)
- I-League top scorer: 2007–08, 2008–09, 2009–10

== Bibliography ==
- Kapadia, Novy (2017). Barefoot to Boots: The Many Lives of Indian Football. Penguin Random House. ISBN 978-0-143-42641-7.
- Mukhopadhay, Subir (2018). সোনায় লেখা ইতিহাসে মোহনবাগান (transl. Mohun Bagan in the history written in gold). ISBN 978-93-850172-0-9.
- Banerjee, Argha; Basu, Rupak (2022). মোহনবাগান: সবুজ ঘাসের মেরুন গল্প (transl. Mohun Bagan: Green fields' Maroon stories). Shalidhan. ISBN 978-81-954667-0-2.
- Dineo, Paul; Mills, James (2001). Soccer in South Asia: Empire, Nation, Diaspora. London, United Kingdom: Frank Cass Publishers. p. 33. ISBN 978-0-7146-8170-2. Archived from the original on 25 July 2022.
- Martinez, Dolores; Mukharji, Projit B (2009). Football: From England to the World: The Many Lives of Indian Football. Routledge. ISBN 978-1-138-88353-6. Archived from the original on 2 July 2022.
- Nath, Nirmal (2011). History of Indian Football: Upto 2009–10. Readers Service. ISBN 9788187891963. Archived from the original on 22 July 2022.
- Chattopadhyay, Hariprasad (17 January 2015). "Time to regain lost glory". telegraphindia.com. Kolkata: The Telegraph India. Archived from the original on 5 May 2016.
- "The Telegraph Calcutta — Odafe comes to Bagan with hope and promise". telegraphindia.com. Kolkata. 2 June 2012. Archived from the original on 26 October 2012.
