= Lalrinzuala Lalbiaknia =

Indian footballer (born 2000)

Personal information
- Full name: Lalrinzuala Lalbiaknia
- Date of birth: 15 September 2000 (age 26)
- Place of birth: Serchhip, Mizoram, India
- Height: 1.71 m (5 ft 7 in)
- Position: Striker

Team information
- Current team: NorthEast United
- Number: 18

Youth career
- 2017–2019: Bengaluru
- 2019–2022: Gokulam Kerala

Senior career*
Years	Team	Apps	(Gls)
2022–2023	Chhinga Veng		
2023	→ Delhi (loan)	2	(0)
2023–2025	Aizawl	40	(27)
2025–	NorthEast United	11	(2)
- * Club domestic league appearances and goals as of 18:36, 19 May 2026 (UTC)

Lalrinzuala Lalbiaknia (born 15 September 2000), known as Rinzuala, is an Indian professional footballer who plays as a forward for Indian Super League club NorthEast United.

== Club career ==
=== Youth career ===
Rinzuala played in the Subroto Cup, before being scouted by Bengaluru FC, which he represented at the U-16 and U-18 levels. He suffered an ACL injury in 2018, that kept him away of the game for 11 months.

Subsequently, he played three seasons for Gokulam Kerala reserves before returning home in 2022 to play for Chhinga Veng, that competed in the Mizoram Premier League. He recalled that it "was a decision that I felt I had to take" and that he "needed to come back home and start afresh".

=== Aizawl ===
==== 2023–24 season ====
On 13 June 2023, I-League club Aizawl secured the services of Rinzuala, on a two-year deal. On 29 October, he made his debut for the club in the 2023–24 I-League campaign against Mohammedan SC, in a 2–1 away loss. On 14 November, Rinzuala scored three goals in a 1–3 win over NEROCA, which was his first professional hat-trick. On 28 March, Rinzuala netted twice in a 4–0 win over Churchill Brothers. In this process, he broke the record for most goals scored by an Indian footballer in a single season of the I-League, with 14 goals, overtaking Sunil Chhetri and Mohammed Rafi.

On 15 April 2025, it was reported that Rinzuala will move to the top-tier Indian Super League next season, after agreeing terms with NorthEast United.

=== NorthEast United ===
On 1 June 2025, Indian Super League club NorthEast United confirmed the signing of Rinzuala.

== Personal life ==
Rinzuala was born in the streets of Serchhip, a town in his home state of Mizoram. His father, who was a driver, died in 2016, before his elder brother died in an accident the following year. His mother started a chicken farm after that, which sustained his family since.

== Career statistics ==
=== Club ===
As of match played 5 April 2025

Appearances and goals by club, season and competition
Club	Season	League			National cup		AFC		Other		Total	
Club	Season	Division	Apps	Goals	Apps	Goals	Apps	Goals	Apps	Goals	Apps	Goals
Chhinga Veng	2022–23	Mizoram Premier League	–		–		–		–		–	
Delhi (loan)	2022–23	I-League 2nd Division	2	0	–		–		–		2	0
Aizawl	2023–24	I-League	20	15	–		–		–		20	15
Aizawl	2024–25	I-League	20	12	–		–		–		20	12
Aizawl	Total		40	27	0	0	0	0	0	0	40	27
Career total			42	27	0	0	0	0	0	0	42	27

== Honours ==
Delhi FC

- I-League 2nd Division: 2022–23

NorthEast United

- Durand Cup: 2025

Individual

- Most goals scored by an Indian in a I-League season – 15 goals
