= Namdhari FC =

Indian association football based in Punjab

Namdhari
- Full name: Namdhari Football Club
- Nickname: The Namdharis
- Short name: NFC
- Founded: 2018; 8 years ago (as Namdhari Football Academy)
- Ground: Namdhari Stadium
- Capacity: 2,000
- Owner: Namdhari Seeds
- Head coach: Harpreet Singh
- League: I-League 2
- 2025–26: Indian Football League, 10th of 10 (relegated)
- Website: namdharisports.in
Home colours	Away colours	Third colours

Namdhari Football Club is an Indian professional football club based in Bhaini Sahib, Punjab. Part of the multi-sports Namdhari Sports Academy, the club competes in the I-League 2, the third division of the Indian football league system, and the Punjab State Super League.

== History ==
The field hockey team, Namdhari XI was first formed in 1975. In 2004, the Namdhari Sports Academy was built in Sri Bhaini Sahib, near Ludhiana. With growing interest in football, the Namdharis established its first football academy in 2018.

In their I-League debut season, the club was managed by Spanish tactician Francesc Bonet. Currently the Argentine Fernando David Capobianco is in charge of the team as head coach. In the 2024–25 season, the club ended their league campaign in seventh place. In the short league season in 2025–26, the club spent most of the time in the bottom half of the table and qualified for the relegation round. On the last matchday, Namdhari sat at 9th place and played 10th place Gokulam Kerala in the relegation decider with a difference of 1 point between the two teams. The match remained tied at 0–0 until the last minute of stoppage time when Gokulam scored a winning goal, relegating the club to the third division for the 2026–27 season.

== Club crest and kits ==
The primary colour of Namdhari Football club has been white with red stripes from its debut I-League season

=== Kit manufacturers and shirt sponsors ===
Period	Kit manufacturer	Shirt sponsor
2023—present	SPS Hospitals	Namdharis

== Stadiums ==
The home stadium of Namdhari FC in its inaugural I-League season is Namdhari stadium located in Bhaini Sahib, Ludhiana, Punjab.

== Players ==
=== First-team squad ===
As of March 2026

Note: Flags indicate national team as defined under FIFA eligibility rules; some limited exceptions apply. Players may hold more than one non-FIFA nationality.

No.	Pos.	Nation	Player
1	GK	IND	Nishan Singh
2	DF	IND	Balkaran Singh
4	DF	IND	Manbir Singh
5	DF	IND	Akashdeep Singh Kahlon
6	DF	IND	Gurshan Singh
7	FW	IND	Manvir Singh
8	DF	IND	Chanpreet Singh
9	FW	GHA	Najib Fuseini
10	MF	IND	Dharmpreet Singh
11	FW	IND	Karandeep Singh
12	FW	IND	Seilenthang Lotjem (on loan from Mumbai City)
13	MF	IND	Ajmer Singh
14	MF	IND	Adersh Mattummal
15	MF	IND	Emanuel Lalchhanchhuaha

No.	Pos.	Nation	Player
16	FW	SEN	Abdoulaye Diallo
17	FW	IND	Jaskaranpreet Singh (captain)
19	MF	GHA	Francis Addo
21	FW	SRB	Milos Gordic
23	GK	IND	Niraj Kumar
24	FW	IND	Aatma Singh
25	DF	GHA	Lamine Moro
29	DF	IND	Karan Kumar Sharma
32	DF	IND	Kamalpreet Singh Grewal
33	MF	IND	Seigougin Chongloi
36	DF	IND	Mohammad Sajid Dhot
37	FW	IND	Bidyashagar Singh
55	GK	IND	Jaita Singh
84	FW	IND	Bhupinder Singh

== Personnel ==
=== Current technical staff ===
As of 25 August 2025

Role	Name
Head coach	(India) Harpreet Singh
Assistant coach	
Team manager	(Thailand) Pramukh Sethapanpanich
Assistant team manager	(India) Jodhbir Singh

== Records and statistics ==
As of 12 May 2026

=== Season by season ===
Season	League									Domestic cup(s)		Top scorer(s)	
Season	Division	Pld	W	D	L	GF	GA	Pts	Pos	Domestic cup(s)		Top scorer(s)	
I-League										Super Cup	Durand Cup	Player(s)	Goals
2023–24	2nd	24	7	6	11	29	40	27	10th	Did not participate	Did not participate	(India) Harmanpreet Singh (India) Akashdeep Singh	5
2024–25	2nd	22	8	5	9	28	30	29	7th	Did not participate	Did not participate	(Brazil) Dé	12
Indian Football League													
2025–26	2nd	12	2	4	6	16	21	10	10th ▼	Did not participate	Group stage	(India) Manvir Singh	3

=== Managerial record ===
Name	Nationality	From	To	P	W	D	L	GF	GA	Win%
Francesc Bonet	Spain	6 October 2023	25 November 2023	5	1	1	3	4	9	20.00
Harpreet Singh (interim)	India	26 November 2023	14 December 2023	4	0	1	3	3	7	0.00
Harpreet Singh	India	15 December 2023	31 May 2024	15	6	4	5	22	24	40.00
Fernando Capobianco	Argentina	25 September 2024	31 December 2024	6	2	2	2	5	5	33.33
Harpreet Singh	India	1 January 2025	present	23	8	6	9	34	34	34.78

== Honours ==
- Punjab State Super Football League
  - Champions (1): 2023–24

== See also ==
- List of football clubs in India
