= Indian Football League =

Second division men's association football league in India

- Organising body: AIFF
- Founded: 2007; 19 years ago (as I-League, succeeding NFL); 2026; 0 years ago (as Indian Football League)
- Country: India
- Confederation: AFC
- Number of clubs: 11
- Level on pyramid: 2
- Promotion to: Indian Super League
- Relegation to: I-League 2
- Domestic cup(s): Federation Cup; Durand Cup
- Current champions: Diamond Harbour (1st title)
- Most championships: Dempo (3 titles)
- Top scorer: Ranti Martins (214 goals)
- Broadcasters: DD Sports; Unite8 Sports; Zee5; Waves OTT
- Website: indianfootballleague.in
- Current: 2026–27 IFL

The Indian Football League (IFL), officially known as Star Cement Indian Football League for sponsorship reasons, previously known as the I-League is the men's second professional football division of the Indian football league system, below the Indian Super League. Administered by the All India Football Federation, it is currently contested by 10 clubs. It operates as a system of promotion and relegation with the ISL and the I-League 2 respectively.

The competition was founded in 2007 as I-League, the successor to the National Football League, with the first season commenced in November 2007. The league was launched as India's first top-tier professional football league with the aim to increase the player pool for the India national team. It operates on a system of promotion and relegation with the I-League 2 and at first only promotion system with the ISL, from the 2022–23 season.

Since the inception of the I-League, a total of ten clubs have been crowned champions. Dempo have won the most titles in league history, being crowned champions three times. Churchill Brothers, Mohun Bagan, Bengaluru and Gokulam Kerala have won the league twice. Inter Kashi, Salgaocar, Aizawl, Minerva Punjab, Chennai City, Roundglass Punjab and Mohammedan have won it once.

Since the inaugural season to 2011, the league was sponsored by ONGC and known as ONGC I-League. Between 2011 and 2013, and between 2023 and 2025, it did not have a title sponsor. For 2014–15 season, Airtel was the title sponsor and it was known as Airtel I-League. From 2014 to 2023, it was sponsored by Hero and known as Hero I-League. Following the rebranding as IFL in 2026, Star Cement became the title sponsor for the league.

== History ==
=== Origins ===
In 1996, the first domestic league was started in India, known as the National Football League, in an effort to introduce professionalism in Indian football. Despite that ambition, that has not been achieved to this date. During the National Football League days, the league suffered from poor infrastructure and unprofessionalism from its clubs. One of the clubs in the league, FC Kochin, went defunct in 2002 after it was revealed that the club had not paid salaries since 2000, after making up 2.5 crores of losses in a season.

After a decade of decline with the National Football League, the All India Football Federation decided it was time for a change. This resulted in the modern day iteration of the top-tier in India.

=== Formation ===
After the 2006–07 NFL season, it was announced that it would be rebranded as the I-League for the 2007–08 season. The league's first season consisted of eight teams from the previous NFL campaign and two teams from the 2nd Division to form a 10 team league. Oil and Natural Gas Corporation (ONGC), the title sponsors of the previous NFL, were named as the title sponsors of the I-League before the league kicked off in November 2007. The league also announced a change in their foreign-player restrictions with the new rule being that all the clubs could sign four foreigners – three non-Asian and one which must be Asian. The league also announced that, for the first season, matches will be broadcast on Zee Sports.

The original ten clubs in the I-League's first season were Air India, Churchill Brothers, Dempo, East Bengal, JCT, Mahindra United, Mohun Bagan, Salgaocar, Sporting Goa and Viva Kerala.

=== The early seasons (2007–2012) ===
The first I-League match took place on 24 November 2007 between Dempo and Salgaocar. The match, which took place at the Fatorda Stadium in Margao, ended 3–0 in favour of Dempo with Chidi Edeh scoring the first goal in league history in the third minute. After eighteen rounds it was Dempo who came out as the first champions in the I-League. Viva Kerala and Salgaocar, however, ended up as the first two teams to ever be relegated from the I-League.

The next season the I-League was expanded from 10 to 12 teams. Mumbai, Chirag United, Mohammedan, and Vasco were all promoted from the I-League 2 to make the expansion possible. This however brought up early concerns over how "national" the I-League was. The 2008–09 season would see eleven of the twelve teams come from three different cities. The previous season saw all ten teams come from four different cities. Bhaichung Bhutia, then captain of the India national team, said that it was the federations job to spread the game across the country and that it needed to happen.

Regardless of the early criticism, the I-League went on as scheduled and once the 2008–09 season concluded. it was Churchill Brothers who came out on top. Then, before the 2009–10 season, the league was once again expanded from 12 teams to 14. In order to make this happen Salgaocar, Viva Kerala, Pune, and Shillong Lajong were all promoted from the 2nd Division to the I-League. This helped the I-League retain some criticism about how national the league was as now the league would be played in seven different cities/states: Goa, Kerala, Kolkata, Mumbai, Pune, Punjab, and Shillong.

After the 2009–10 season it was Dempo who came out on top for the second time in I-League history.

==== Conflict of parties ====
On 9 December 2010 the All India Football Federation signed a 15-year, 700-crore deal with Reliance Industries and International Management Group of the United States. The deal gave IMG-Reliance exclusive commercial rights to sponsorship, advertising, broadcasting, merchandising, video, franchising, and rights to create a new football league. This deal came about after the AIFF ended their 10-year deal with Zee Sports five years early.

Two months later, on 8 February 2011, it was reported that twelve of the fourteen I-League clubs held a private meeting in Mumbai to discuss the ongoing issues related to the league. It was never revealed what was exactly talked about at this meeting. Then, on 22 February, it was announced that the same twelve I-League clubs that attended the meeting would not be signing the AFC–licensing papers needed to play in the I-League. The reasoning for this was because the I-League clubs were not happy over the fact that IMG-Reliance had so far done nothing to promote the I-League and that they demanded the I-League be made a separate entity from both the AIFF and IMG-Reliance. At this time however there were rumours that IMG-Reliance had been planning on revamping the I-League along the same lines as Major League Soccer of the United States for the 2012–13 season.

On 11 March 2012, following the disbanding of two former I-League clubs – JCT and Mahindra United, it was announced that the I-League clubs would be forming their own organization known as the Indian Professional Football Clubs Association (IPFCA) in order to safeguard their interest and promote football in India. Every club, except for HAL and AIFF–owned Pailan Arrows, joined the newly formed organization. Soon after, it was announced that there would be a meeting held between the AIFF, IMG-Reliance, and the IPFCA on 20 April 2012. In this meeting, IMG-Reliance would present their plan on how they would grow the I-League but the meeting never occurred for reasons unknown.

Then, on 4 May 2012, the AIFF hosted the last ad hoc meeting – an annual meeting between the AFC and AIFF to assess the growth of Indian football. The AFC president at the time, Zhang Jilong, was also in attendance at this meeting. It was reported that the IPFCA would use this meeting to voice their displeasure at the AIFF and IMG-Reliance but the association never showed up at the meeting.

On 18 June 2012 the IPFCA was officially sanctioned under the Society's Act of 1960.

==== League improvement ====
Despite the ongoing war between the AIFF, IMG-Reliance, and the IPFCA, the league did manage to improve its product on the field and awareness did increase during this period. It all started when the India national team participated in the AFC Asian Cup in 2011 for the first time in 27 years. Despite being knocked-out in the group stage after losing all three of their games, India came back home more popular than ever. Subrata Pal, of Pune gained the most popularity after his impressive performances in goal for India during the Asian Cup. At the same time, before the Asian Cup, Sunil Chhetri became the second Indian footballer in the modern footballing era to move abroad when he signed for the Kansas City Wizards in Major League Soccer in 2010. He also became the first exported Indian from the I-League.

The league was then given a major boost from its main derby, the Kolkata derby, between East Bengal and Mohun Bagan. On 20 November 2011, 90,000 people watched at the Salt Lake Stadium as Mohun Bagan defeated East Bengal 1–0. The league also saw more expansion to others areas with the promotion of United Sikkim from the 2nd Division, however, their reign was short lived as financial troubles saw them relegated the next season.

Meanwhile, while the league continued to grow, so did the players' demand. During this period plenty of Indian players were wanted on trial by foreign clubs, mainly in Europe. After his return from MLS, Sunil Chhetri and international teammate Jeje Lalpekhlua were called for trials at Scottish Premier League side Rangers in 2011. Subrata Pal had trials at RB Leipzig before finally signing for Vestsjælland in 2014. And Gurpreet Singh Sandhu underwent trials at then Premier League side Wigan Athletic and finally signing for Stabæk Fotball, Norway in 2014.

At the same time, as Indian players demand abroad increased, the demand for higher quality foreigners in the I-League also increased. Former A-League player of the year and Costa Rican international Carlos Hernández signed with Prayag United before the 2012–13 season from the Melbourne Victory. Lebanese international Bilal Najjarine also signed with Churchill Brothers in 2012.

=== Demotion to second tier ===
On 18 May 2016, IMG–Reliance, along with the AIFF and I-League representatives met during a meeting in Mumbai. At the meeting, it was proposed that starting from the 2017–18 season, the Indian Super League becomes the top-tier football league in India while the I-League gets relegated to the second tier, but the idea was not entertained by the I-League representatives.

In 2017, FIFA and the AFC had appointed a committee to look at the footballing landscape in the country which was in disarray due to two simultaneous leagues running together, and come up with solutions to re-establish a singular league pyramid which would be acceptable for everyone. In the month of June, IMG–Reliance, the AIFF and the I-League representatives, met with the AFC in Kuala Lumpur in order to find a new way forward for Indian football. The AFC were against allowing the ISL as the premier league in India while the clubs like East Bengal and Mohun Bagan wanted a complete merger of ISL and I-League. A couple weeks later, the AIFF proposed that both ISL and I-League run simultaneously on a short–term basis with the I-League champions retaining the spot for the AFC Champions League qualifying stage, while the AFC Cup qualifying stage spot going to the ISL champions. The proposal from the AIFF was officially approved by the AFC on 25 July 2017, with the ISL replacing the domestic cup competition, the Federation Cup.

On 14 October 2019, the AFC held a summit in Kuala Lumpur, chaired by the AFC Secretary General Windsor John, which involved key stakeholders from the AIFF, the FSDL, the ISL and the I-League clubs, and other major stakeholders to propose a new roadmap to facilitate the football league system in India. Based on the roadmap that was prepared by the AFC and the AIFF at the summit and was finally approved by the AFC Executive Committee on 26 October in Da Nang, in 2019–20 season, ISL will attain the country's top-tier league status, allowing the ISL premiers to play AFC Champions League and the I-League champions to play AFC Cup. In addition, starting with the 2022–23 season, I-League will lose the top-tier status, wherein the champion of the I-League will stand a chance to be promoted to the ISL with no participation fee. In its recommendation for 2024–25, it was agreed to fully implement promotion and relegation between the two leagues, and abolition of parallel league system.

=== Restructure and Rebranding ===
Earlier logo of the league as I-League, depicting the trophy.

IFL logo launched in 2026.

On 28 January 2026, in a press conference AIFF indicated that the league would set to be rebranded as "Indian Football League" from 2025–26 season. In the press conference, a new governance structure for leagues were rolled out. It was announced a new Governing Council will be formed in which the clubs, the AIFF and the commercial partner would be represented and hold equity. The clubs together would own 60 percent of stake, the AIFF would own 10 percent and the commercial partner would own 30 per cent of stake in the league. However, legally AIFF will continue to own the league, but it had limited its role to mainly compliance and disciplinary matter and narrowed its influence in commercials dealings. Finally, on 12 February 2026, the AIFF's executive committee approved the rebranding of the I-League to the Indian Football League. It had also released a new logo for the rebranded league.

== Competition format ==
Currently, clubs plays each other twice during the season, once home and away. At the end of the season, the club with the most points wins the league and gains promotion. In the case of a tie, head-to-head record and the goal difference are looked.

== Clubs ==
=== Current clubs ===
Locations of the IFL clubs

Club	State/UT	City	Stadium	Capacity
Bengaluru United	Karnataka	Bengaluru	Bangalore Football Stadium	8,400
Chanmari	Mizoram	Aizawl	Rajiv Gandhi Stadium	20,000
Dempo	Goa	Margao	Fatorda Stadium	19,000
Gokulam Kerala	Kerala	Kozhikode	EMS Stadium	50,000
Mohammedan	West Bengal	Kolkata	Kalyani Stadium	20,000
Nagaland United	Nagaland	Chümoukedima	Chümoukedima Football Stadium	5,000
Rajasthan United	Rajasthan	Jaipur	Vidyadhar Nagar Stadium	3,000
Real Kashmir	Jammu & Kashmir	Srinagar	TRC Turf Ground	10,000
Samaleswari	Odisha	Rourkela	Birsa Munda Athletic Stadium	9,000
Shillong Lajong	Meghalaya	Shillong	SSA Stadium	5,000
Sreenidi Deccan	Telangana	Hyderabad	Deccan Arena	1,500

=== All time clubs ===
A total of 45 clubs have participated in the I-League and its successor, the Indian Football League, since its inception in 2007. The following is a list of clubs that have participated in the competition from the 2007–08 season to the current season. Teams participating in the 2026–27 season are indicated in bold.

Indian Football League
Indian Super League
I-League 2
I-League 3 & State leagues
Defunct clubs
Operational academies

As of 2026

Pos.	Team	S	P	W	D	L	GF	GA	GD	Pts	1st	2nd	3rd	1st App	Last / Recent app	Highest finish
1	Churchill Brothers	**16**	**340**	**156**	**91**	93	**593**	**415**	**178**	**559**	2	**4**	1	2007–08	2024–25	1st
2	East Bengal	13	276	126	75	75	425	282	143	453	0	4	**3**	2007–08	2019–20	2nd
3	Mohun Bagan	13	276	126	85	65	430	301	129	451 (Note: All points prior (12) to this match were deducted as they refused to play the second half of Kolkata Derby in the 2012-13 season. https://www.sportskeeda.com/football/aiff-revoke-mohun-bagans-i-league-ban-but-deduct-12-points)	2	3	1	2007–08	2019–20	1st
4	**Dempo**	10	224	101	63	60	389	260	129	366	**3**	0	1	2007–08	2025–26	1st
5	**Shillong Lajong**	12	254	76	74	**104**	330	410	-80	302	0	1	0	2009–10	2025–26	2nd
6	Aizawl	11	196	65	54	77	263	275	-12	249	1	0	0	2015–16	2025–26	1st
7	**Gokulam Kerala**	9	166	75	37	54	277	207	70	262	2	0	0	2017–18	2025–26	1st
8	Salgaocar	8	182	70	46	66	258	229	29	256	1	0	1	2007–08	2015–16	1st
9	Sporting Goa	8	178	62	57	59	241	249	-8	243	0	0	1	2007–08	2015–16	3rd
10	Pune	6	148	63	45	40	219	168	51	234	0	1	1	2009–10	2014–15	2nd
11	Mumbai	9	204	53	72	79	219	281	-62	231	0	0	0	2008–09	2016–17	5th
12	**Real Kashmir**	8	147	57	48	42	201	163	38	219	0	0	2	2018–19	2025–26	3rd
13	United	6	150	48	55	47	202	200	2	199	0	0	0	2008–09	2013–14	4th
14	Punjab (including Minerva Punjab season records)	7	127	52	35	40	170	149	21	191	2	0	1	2016–17	2022–23	1st
15	**Mohammedan**	6	125	49	34	42	174	161	13	181	1	1	0	2008–09	2023–24	1st
16	**Sreenidi Deccan**	5	100	50	26	24	177	124	53	176	0	2	2	2021–22	2025–26	2nd
17	Indian Arrows	8	163	34	38	91	133	267	-134	140	0	0	0	2010–11	2021–22	8th
18	Bengaluru	4	78	42	20	16	131	79	52	146	2	1	0	2013–14	2016–17	1st
19	NEROCA	7	132	38	30	64	157	213	-56	144	0	1	0	2017–18	2023–24	2nd
20	Air India	6	144	33	45	66	142	249	-107	144	0	0	0	2007–08	2012–13	8th
21	TRAU	6	112	36	25	51	134	178	-44	133	0	0	1	2019–20	2023–24	3rd
22	**Rajasthan United**	5	100	32	27	41	129	168	-39	123	0	0	0	2021–22	2025–26	4th
23	JCT	4	92	29	27	36	93	100	-7	114	0	0	1	2007–08	2010–11	3rd
24	Chennai City	5	85	31	21	33	112	126	-14	114	1	0	0	2016–17	2020–21	1st
25	Mahindra United	3	66	25	25	16	97	69	28	100	0	0	0	2007–08	2009–10	4th
26	Viva Kerala	4	96	22	23	51	96	160	-64	89	0	0	0	2007–08	2011–12	9th
27	Inter Kashi	2	46	23	14	9	90	72	18	83	1	0	0	2023–24	2024–25	1st
28	Namdhari	3	58	17	15	26	71	93	-22	69	0	0	0	2023–24	2025–26	6th
29	ONGC	2	52	12	19	21	55	76	-21	55	0	0	0	2010–11	2012–13	9th
30	Sudeva Delhi	3	48	13	13	22	42	60	-18	52	0	0	0	2020–21	2022–23	8th
31	Delhi	2	46	14	7	25	65	84	-17	49	0	0	0	2023–24	2024-25	6th
32	DSK Shivajians	2	34	7	12	15	38	55	-17	33	0	0	0	2015–16	2016–17	7th
33	HAL	2	52	7	11	34	37	108	-71	32	0	0	0	2010–11	2011–12	12th
34	Royal Wahingdoh	1	20	8	6	6	27	27	0	30	0	0	1	2014–15	2014–15	3rd
35	Diamond Harbour	1	14	9	2	3	31	20	11	29	1	0	0	2025–26	2025–26	1st
36	Kenkre	2	39	6	11	22	34	65	-31	29	0	0	0	2021–22	2022–23	13th
37	Rangdajied United	1	24	6	7	11	29	38	-9	25	0	0	0	2013–14	2013–14	11th
38	Sporting Bengaluru	1	22	5	6	11	24	42	-18	21	0	0	0	2024–25	2024–25	11th
39	Kalyani Bharat	1	20	4	6	10	13	28	-15	18	0	0	0	2014–15	2014–15	11th
40	**Chanmari**	1	14	4	3	7	19	25	-6	15	0	0	0	2025–26	2025–26	5th
41	United Sikkim	1	26	2	9	15	23	63	-40	15	0	0	0	2012–13	2012–13	14th
42	Vasco da Gama	1	22	2	4	16	14	49	-35	10	0	0	0	2008–09	2008–09	12th
43	**Bengaluru United**	1	-	-	-	-	-	-	-	-	-	-	-	-	-	-
44	**Nagaland United**	1	-	-	-	-	-	-	-	-	-	-	-	-	-	-
45	**Samaleswari**	1	-	-	-	-	-	-	-	-	-	-	-	-	-	-

=== Clubs qualifying for I-League ===
Direct corporate bid entered clubs to I-League
Season	Clubs
2013–14	Bengaluru
2014–15	Bharat
2015–16	DSK Shivajians
2016–17	Churchill Brothers, Chennai City, Minerva Punjab
2017–18	Gokulam Kerala
2020–21	Sudeva Delhi
2021–22	Sreenidi Deccan
2023–24	Inter Kashi, Namdhari

Promoted clubs from I-League 2 to I-League
Season	Clubs
2008	Mumbai, Mohammedan, United, Vasco
2009	Salgaocar, Viva Kerala, Shillong Lajong, Pune
2010	ONGC, HAL
2011	Shillong Lajong, Sporting Goa
2012	ONGC, United Sikkim
2013	Rangdajied United, Mohammedan
2014	Royal Wahingdoh
2015	Aizawl
2015–16	Dempo
2016–17	NEROCA
2017–18	Real Kashmir
2018–19	TRAU
2020	Mohammedan
2021	Rajasthan United, Mumbai Kenkre
2022–23	Delhi, Shillong Lajong
2023–24	Sporting Bengaluru, Dempo
2024–25	Diamond Harbour, Chanmari FC
2025–26	Delhi (Note: Delhi FC transferred its licence to Samaleswari), Bengaluru United

=== Clubs promoted/relegated from I-League ===
Promoted clubs from I-League to Indian Super League
Season	Clubs
2022–23	RoundGlass Punjab
2023–24	Mohammedan
2024–25	Inter Kashi
2025–26	Diamond Harbour (Note: Did not take up its ISL place due to unpaid participation fee.)

Relegated clubs from I-League to I-League 2
Season	Clubs
2007–08	Viva Kerala, Salgaocar
2008–09	Mohammedan, Vasco
2009–10	Sporting Clube de Goa, Shillong Lajong
2010–11	JCT, ONGC
2011–12	Viva Kerala, HAL
2012–13	Air India, United Sikkim
2013–14	Mohammedan
2014–15	Dempo
2015–16	None (Note: Aizawl FC were relegated, but reinstated to I-League due to withdrawal of 3 Goan clubs.)
2016–17	Mumbai
2017–18	None (Note: Churchill Brothers SC were relegated, but reinstated to I-League after the appeal.)
2018–19	Shillong Lajong
2019–20	None (Note: Aizawl FC were relegated, but reinstated to I-League after inclusion of two I-League clubs to Indian Super League)
2020–21	None (Note: NEROCA FC were relegated but were reinstated by AIFF after viewing the situation of COVID-19 pandemic in India.)
2021–22	None (Note: Mumbai Kenkre FC were relegated but were reinstated after the closure of the Indian Arrows project.)
2022–23	Mumbai Kenkre, Sudeva Delhi
2023–24	NEROCA, TRAU
2024–25	Delhi, Sporting Bengaluru
2025–26	Namdhari, Churchill Brothers (Note: Churchill Brothers were demoted for non-participation.)

=== Licence transfers ===
Season	Entered club	Exited club
2026–27	Samaleswari	Delhi FC
2026–27	Nagaland United	Aizawl

== Sponsorship ==
When the I-League began in 2007, the last sponsor from the old National Football League, ONGC, were brought in, making the league be known as the ONGC I-League. However, after the 2010–11 season, the deal with ONGC was not renewed and the I-League was left without a sponsorship deal till 2013. On 24 September 2013, it was announced that telecommunications company Airtel would be the new title sponsor of the I-League, making it known as the Airtel I-League. In December 2014, it was announced that Hero MotoCorp would replace Airtel as the title sponsor and hence the league would be known as the Hero I-League. Hero decided not to renew its sponsorship deal after 2022–23 season. Following the rebrandin in 2026, Star Cement became the title sponsor of the IFL.

Title sponsors
Period	Title sponsor	Brand
2007–2011	ONGC	ONGC I-League
2011–2013	N/A	I-League
2013–2014	Airtel	Airtel I-League
2014–2023	Hero	Hero I-League
2023–2025	N/A	I-League
2026–	Star Cement	Star Cement Indian Football League

== Media coverage ==
Broadcasting partners
Period	TV telecast	Online streaming
2007–2010	Zee Sports	—
2010–2017	Ten Action, Ten Sports	DittoTV
2017–2019	Star Sports	Hotstar, JioTV
2019–2022	1Sports	Facebook, JioTV
2022–2023	Eurosport, DD Sports	Discovery plus
2023–2024	Eurosport	FanCode
2024–2025	Sony Sports	SSEN
2026	DD Sports, Sony Sports	Waves, SonyLIV
2026–present	DD Sports, Unite8 Sports	Waves, ZEE5

== Coaches ==
The role of the head coach in the I-League varies from club to club. Some like to appoint technical or sporting directors as well as manager-style coaches. The All India Football Federation does impose licensing requirements for head coaches in the I-League, the rule being that the head coach must have an AFC Professional Coaching Diploma in order to coach in the I-League. However, some clubs and coaches like Subhash Bhowmick, Subrata Bhattacharya, Sukhwinder Singh and Bimal Ghosh were known for accepting a technical director role in order to bypass the head coaching requirements. This has bought about a lot of controversial news, most recently being when Churchill Brothers won the I-League after the 2012–13 season with Subhash Bhowmick not winning the "Coach of the Year" award, due to being listed as the technical director.

Seeing this, the AIFF technical director, Rob Baan, as well as others, advocated that the federation make it mandatory for both technical directors and head coaches to have an AFC Pro-Diploma. On 14 May 2014 this was officially put into act by the AIFF during their I-League licensing committee meeting.

In terms of coaching performance, after the first seven seasons of the I-League, an Indian head coach has won the I-League four times while a foreign head coach has won it three times. Zoran Đorđević of Serbia was the first foreign head coach to win the I-League. Italian coach Vincenzo Alberto Annese became the first coach to win back-to-back I-League titles in 2020–21 and 2021–22 seasons.

Armando Colaco was the first Indian coach to win the I-League in the league's opening season and he has the most I-League championships at three. Khogen Singh is the latest Indian coach to win the I-League in 2017–18 season.

Current coaches in the I-League
Nat.	Name	Club	Appointed	Time since appointment
(India)	R.Lalruatfela	Aizawl	27 February 2026	268 days
(Spain)	Dimitris Dimotriou	Gokulam Kerala	6 June 2025	1 year, 169 days
(Cyprus)	none	Churchill Brothers	25 October 2024	2 years, 28 days
(India)	Samir Naik	Dempo	1 July 2017	9 years, 144 days
(India)	Carlos Vaz Pinto	Sreenidi Deccan	28 January 2025	1 year, 298 days
(India)	Vikas Rawat	Rajasthan United	12 March 2025	1 year, 255 days
(India)	Bibendra Thapa	Shillong Lajong	16 September 2022	4 years, 67 days
(India)	Ishfaq Ahmed	Real Kashmir	27 October 2022	4 years, 26 days
(India)	Harpreet Singh	Namdhari	25 November 2023	2 years, 362 days
(Spain)	Kibu Vicuña	Diamond Harbour	23 February 2023	3 years, 272 days
(India)	Dipankur Sharma	Chanmari	6 January 2025	1 year, 320 days
(India)	Yan Law	Delhi	25 June 2023	3 years, 150 days
(India)	Chinta Chandrashekar Rao	Sporting Bengaluru	1 April 2023	3 years, 235 days

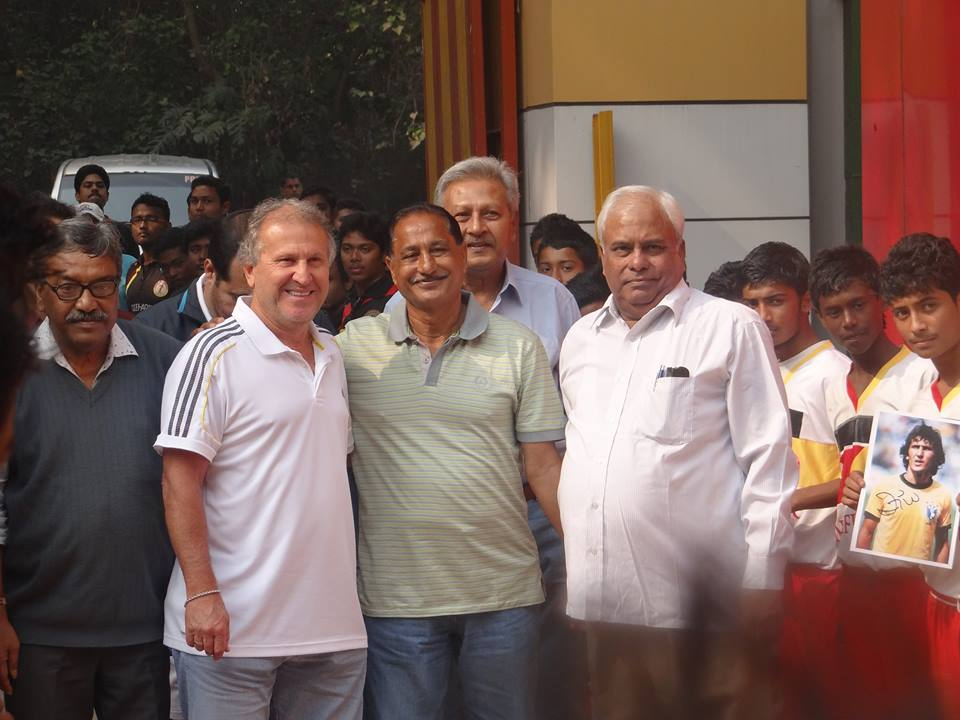
Former Dempo manager Armando Colaco was the longest serving and most successful manager in the history of the I League.

Winning head coaches
Head coach	Wins	Winning year(s)	Team
(India) Armando Colaco	3	2007–08, 2009–10, 2011–12	Dempo
(England) Ashley Westwood	2	2013–14, 2015–16	Bengaluru
(Italy) Vincenzo Alberto Annese	2	2020–21, 2021–22	Gokulam Kerala
(Greece) Staikos Vergetis	1	2022–23	RoundGlass Punjab
(Spain) Kibu Vicuña	1	2019–20	Mohun Bagan
(Singapore) Akbar Nawas	1	2018–19	Chennai City
(India) Khogen Singh	1	2017–18	Minerva Punjab
(India) Khalid Jamil	1	2016–17	Aizawl
(India) Sanjoy Sen	1	2014–15	Mohun Bagan
(India) Mariano Dias	1	2012–13	Churchill Brothers
(Morocco) Karim Bencherifa	1	2010–11	Salgaocar
(Serbia) Zoran Đorđević	1	2008–09	Churchill Brothers
(Russia) Andrey Chernyshov	1	2023–24	Mohammedan
(Spain) Antonio López Habas	1	2024-25	Inter Kashi

== Champions ==
Season	Champions	Runners-up	Third place	Clubs
Operated as First Division League
2007–08	Dempo	Churchill Brothers	JCT	10
2008–09	Churchill Brothers	Mohun Bagan	Sporting Goa	12
2009–10	Dempo	Churchill Brothers	Pune	14
2010–11	Salgaocar	East Bengal	Dempo	14
2011–12	Dempo	East Bengal	Churchill Brothers	14
2012–13	Churchill Brothers	Pune	East Bengal	14
2013–14	Bengaluru	East Bengal	Salgaocar	13
2014–15	Mohun Bagan	Bengaluru	Royal Wahingdoh	11
2015–16	Bengaluru	Mohun Bagan	East Bengal	9
2016–17	Aizawl	Mohun Bagan	East Bengal	10
Operated as Joint First Division League with ISL
2017–18	Minerva Punjab	NEROCA	Mohun Bagan	10
2018–19	Chennai City	East Bengal	Real Kashmir	11
2019–20	Mohun Bagan	Not awarded (Note: Matches after 14th March 2020 were cancelled due to the COVID-19 pandemic. Mohun Bagan were declared the champions, having enough point difference between the second-placed club.)		11
2020–21	Gokulam Kerala	Churchill Brothers	TRAU	11
2021–22	Gokulam Kerala	Mohammedan	Sreenidi Deccan	13
Designated as Second Division League
2022–23	RoundGlass Punjab	Sreenidi Deccan	Gokulam Kerala	12
2023–24	Mohammedan	Sreenidi Deccan	Gokulam Kerala	13
2024–25	Inter Kashi	Churchill Brothers	Real Kashmir	12
2025–26	Diamond Harbour	Shillong Lajong	Sreenidi Deccan	10

== Performance by club ==
Club	Titles	Runners-up	Third place	Winning season	Runners-up season	Third place season
Dempo	3	0	1	2007–08, 2009–10, 2011–12		2010–11
Churchill Brothers	2	4	1	2008–09, 2012–13,	2007–08, 2009–10, 2020–21, 2024–25	2011–12
Mohun Bagan	2	3	1	2014–15, 2019–20	2008–09, 2015–16, 2016–17	2017–18
Bengaluru	2	1	0	2013–14, 2015–16	2014–15	
Gokulam Kerala	2	0	2	2020–21, 2021–22		2022–23, 2023–24
Mohammedan	1	1	0	2023–24	2021–22	
Salgaocar	1	0	1	2010–11		2013–14
Minerva Punjab	1	0	0	2017–18		
Aizawl	1	0	0	2016–17		
Chennai City	1	0	0	2018–19		
RoundGlass Punjab	1	0	0	2022–23		
Inter Kashi	1	0	0	2024-25		
Diamond Harbour	1	0	0	2025–26		
East Bengal	0	4	3		2010–11, 2011–12, 2013–14, 2018–19	2012–13, 2015–16, 2016–17
Sreenidi Deccan	0	2	2		2022–23, 2023–24	2021–22, 2025–26
Pune	0	1	1		2012–13	2009–10
NEROCA	0	1	0		2017–18	
Shillong Lajong	0	1	0		2025–26	
Real Kashmir	0	0	2			2018–19, 2024–25
JCT	0	0	1			2007–08
Sporting Goa	0	0	1			2008–09
Royal Wahingdoh	0	0	1			2014–15
TRAU	0	0	1			2020–21

== Records and statistics ==
=== Individual game highest attendance records ===
Rank	Home	Score	Away	Attendance	Stadium	Date
1	Mohun Bagan	1–0	East Bengal	90,000	Salt Lake Stadium	20 November 2011
2	Mohun Bagan	0–1	East Bengal	80,000	Salt Lake Stadium	24 November 2013
3	Mohun Bagan	2–1	East Bengal	63,756	Salt Lake Stadium	19 January 2020
4	Mohun Bagan	1–1	East Bengal	63,342	Salt Lake Stadium	26 January 2016
5	Mohun Bagan	1–0	East Bengal	57,780	Salt Lake Stadium	28 March 2015

=== Seasonal statistics ===
Season	Total goals	Matches played	Average per game
2007–08	226	90	2.51
2008–09	318	132	2.41
2009–10	486	182	2.67
2010–11	489	182	2.69
2011–12	521	182	2.88
2012–13	530	182	2.91
2013–14	402	156	2.47
2014–15	280	110	2.55
2015–16	186	72	2.58
2016–17	225	90	2.5
2017–18	204	90	2.27
2018–19	303	109	2.78
2019–20	187	69 (Note: Due to the COVID-19 pandemic the league was suspended and no individual prizes were awarded. However, Aser Pierrick Dipanda of Minerva Punjab scored the highest number of goals, having scored 12 goals in 15 matches; whereas, Rochharzela of Aizawl scored 6 goals in 15 matches, highest among Indians.)	2.71
2020–21	216	80	2.7
2021–22	294	114	2.58
2022–23	360	132	2.73
2023–24	503	156	3.22

=== Player transfer fees ===
==== Top transfer fees paid by I-League clubs ====
Rank	Player	Fee	Year	Transfer out	Transfer in	Reference
1	(Nigeria) Uga Okpara	₹7 crore (US$750,000)	2009	(Nigeria) Enyimba	(India) East Bengal	
2	(Nigeria) Odafa Onyeka Okolie	₹3 crore (US$320,000)	2011	(India) Mohun Bagan	(India) Churchill Brothers	
3	(India) Lester Fernandez	₹20 lakh (US$21,000)	2012	(India) Pune	(India) Prayag United	
4	(India) Ronaldo Oliveira	₹10 lakh (US$11,000)	2019	(India) Salgaocar	(India) East Bengal	

==== Top transfer fees received by I-League clubs ====
Rank	Player	Fee	Year	Transfer out	Transfer in	Reference
1	(Uganda) Khalid Aucho	₹4 crore (US$430,000)	2019	(India) Churchill Brothers	(Egypt) Misr Lel Makkasa	
2	(India) Sunil Chhetri	₹1.14 crore (US$120,000)	2014	(India) Bengaluru	(India) Mumbai City	
3	(Spain) Pedro Manzi	₹1 crore (US$110,000)	2020	(India) Chennai City	(Japan) Albirex Niigata	
4	(India) Eugeneson Lyngdoh	₹90 lakh (US$96,000)	2014	(India) Bengaluru	(India) Pune City	

=== Top scorers ===
I-League Golden Boot winners
Season	Player	Club	Goals	Ref(s)
2007–08	(Nigeria) Odafa Onyeka Okolie	Churchill Brothers	22	
2008–09	(Nigeria) Odafa Onyeka Okolie	Churchill Brothers	26	
2009–10	(Nigeria) Odafa Onyeka Okolie	Churchill Brothers	22	
2010–11	(Nigeria) Ranti Martins	Dempo	30	
2011–12	(Nigeria) Ranti Martins	Dempo	32	
2012–13	(Nigeria) Ranti Martins	Prayag United	27	
2013–14	(India) Sunil Chhetri	Bengaluru	14	
2013–14	(Scotland) Darryl Duffy	Salgaocar	14	
2013–14	(Trinidad and Tobago) Cornell Glen	Shillong Lajong	14	
2014–15	(Nigeria) Ranti Martins	East Bengal	17	
2015–16	(Nigeria) Ranti Martins	East Bengal	12	
2016–17	(Cameroon) Aser Pierrick Dipanda	Shillong Lajong	11	
2017–18	(Cameroon) Aser Pierrick Dipanda	Mohun Bagan	13	
2018–19	(Uruguay) Pedro Manzi	Chennai City	21	
2018–19	(Trinidad and Tobago) Willis Plaza	Churchill Brothers	21	
2019–20	—N/a	Not Awarded		
2020–21	(India) Bidyashagar Singh	TRAU	12	
2021–22	(Trinidad and Tobago) Marcus Joseph	Mohammedan	15	
2022–23	(Slovenia) Luka Majcen	RoundGlass Punjab	16	
2023–24	(Spain) Álex Sánchez	Gokulam Kerala	19	
2024–25	(Colombia) David Castañeda	Sreenidi Deccan	17	
2025–26	(Trinidad and Tobago) Marcus Joseph	Dempo	9	

Indian top scorers
Season	Player	Club	Goals	Ref(s)
2007–08	Bhaichung Bhutia	Mohun Bagan	9	
2008–09	Sunil Chhetri	East Bengal	9	
2009–10	Mohammed Rafi	Mahindra United	13	
2010–11	Jeje Lalpekhlua	Indian Arrows	13	
2011–12	Chinadorai Sabeeth	Pailan Arrows	9	
2012–13	C. K. Vineeth	Prayag United	7	
2013–14	Sunil Chhetri	Bengaluru	14	
2014–15	Thongkhosiem Haokip	Pune	7	
2015–16	Sunil Chhetri	Bengaluru	5	
2015–16	Sushil Kumar Singh	Mumbai	5	
2016–17	Sunil Chettri	Bengaluru	7	
2016–17	C. K. Vineeth	Bengaluru	7	
2017–18	Abhijit Sarkar	Indian Arrows	4	
2017–18	Subhash Singh	NEROCA	4	
2018–19	Jobby Justin	East Bengal	9	
2019–20	—N/a	Not Awarded		
2020–21	Bidyashagar Singh	TRAU	12	
2021–22	Thahir Zaman	Gokulam Kerala	5	
2021–22	Shubho Paul	Sudeva Delhi	5	
2022–23	Seilenthang Lotjem	Sudeva Delhi	6	
2022–23	Samuel Kynshi	Real Kashmir	6	
2023–24	Lalrinzuala Lalbiaknia	Aizawl	15	
2024–25	Lalrinzuala Lalbiaknia	Aizawl	12	
2025–26	Phrangki Buam	Shillong Lajong	8	

== Awards ==
=== The trophy ===
The I-League has been awarding the champion trophy since 2013, when Churchill Brothers won the league. It is modeled along the lines of the champion trophies in the top European leagues. Regarding the trophy, the AIFF general secretary Kushal Das said: "It is the endeavour of AIFF to practice the best principles of other leagues and accordingly we thought to create a more contemporary look to the I-League trophy in line with trophies given in European leagues".

=== Season awards ===
End of the season I-League awards were previously conducted by the Football Players' Association of India. Currently, the awards include Hero of the league, golden boot, golden glove, the best head coach (Syed Abdul Rahim Award), the best defender (Jarnail Singh Award), the best midfielder and the emerging player of the league.

==== Hero of the League ====
Season	Player	Club
2016–17	(India) Sunil Chhetri	Bengaluru
2018–19	(Spain) Pedro Manzi	Chennai City
2020–21	(India) Bidyashagar Singh	TRAU
2021–22	(Trinidad and Tobago) Marcus Joseph	Mohammedan

==== Syed Abdul Rahim Award ====
Season	Head coach	Club
2008–09	(England) Dave Booth	Mumbai
2009–10	(India) Armando Colaco	Dempo
2010–11	(Morocco) Karim Bencherifa	Salgaocar
2011–12	(England) Trevor Morgan	East Bengal
2012–13	(India) Derrick Pereira	Pune
2013–14	(England) Ashley Westwood	Bengaluru
2014–15	(India) Sanjoy Sen	Mohun Bagan
2015–16	(England) Ashley Westwood	Bengaluru
2016–17	(India) Khalid Jamil	Aizawl
2017–18	(India) Gift Raikhan	NEROCA
2018–19	(Singapore) Akbar Nawas	Chennai City
2020–21	(India) L. Nandakumar Singh	TRAU
2021–22	(Italy) Vincenzo Alberto Annese	Gokulam Kerala

==== Emerging player of the season ====
Season	Player	Position	Club
2008–09	(India) Baljit Sahni	Forward	JCT
2009–10	(India) Joaquim Abranches	Forward	Dempo
2010–11	(India) Jeje Lalpekhlua	Forward	Pailan Arrows
2011–12	(India) Manandeep Singh	Forward	Pailan Arrows
2012–13	(India) Alwyn George	Midfielder	Pailan Arrows
2013–14	(India) Alwyn George	Midfielder	Dempo
2015–16	(India) Udanta Singh	Winger	Bengaluru
2016–17	(India) Jerry Lalrinzuala	Left Back	DSK Shivajians
2017–18	(India) Samuel Lalmuanpuia	Midfielder	Shillong Lajong
2018–19	(India) Phrangi Buam	Midfielder	Shillong Lajong
2020–21	(India) Emil Benny	Forward	Gokulam Kerala
2021–22	(India) Jiteshwor Singh	Midfielder	NEROCA

==== Foreign player of the year ====
Season	Player	Position	Club
2008–09	(Nigeria) Odafe Onyeka Okolie	Forward	Churchill Brothers
2009–10	(Nigeria) Odafe Onyeka Okolie	Forward	Churchill Brothers
2010–11	(Brazil) Beto	Midfielder	Dempo
2011–12	(Nigeria) Ranti Martins	Forward	Dempo
2012–13	(Nigeria) Ranti Martins	Forward	Prayag United
2013–14	(Scotland) Darryl Duffy	Forward	Salgaocar

==== Indian Player of the Season ====
Season	Player	Position	Club
2008–09	(India) Sunil Chhetri	Forward	East Bengal
2009–10	(India) Mohammed Rafi	Forward	Mahindra United
2010–11	(India) Mehtab Hossain	Midfielder	East Bengal
2011–12	(India) Syed Nabi	Defender	Mohun Bagan
2012–13	(India) Lenny Rodrigues	Midfielder	Churchill Brothers
2013–14	(India) Balwant Singh	Forward	Churchill Brothers

==== Fans' player of the year ====
Season	Player	Position	Club
2008–09	(Nigeria) Odafe Onyeka Okolie	Forward	Churchill Brothers
2009–10	(India) Subrata Pal	Goalkeeper	Pune
2010–11	(India) Mehtab Hossain	Midfielder	East Bengal
2011–12	(India) Francis Fernandes	Midfielder	Salgaocar
2012–13	(Afghanistan) Zohib Islam Amiri	Defender	Mumbai
2013–14	(India) Boithang Haokip	Midfielder	Shillong Lajong

== Clubs in Asia ==
Traditionally, I-League clubs have done well in the AFC Cup. In 2008 Dempo managed to reach the semi-finals, before being defeated by Al-Safa of Lebanon. East Bengal also managed to reach the semi-finals in 2013, before being knocked-out by Al-Kuwait. Bengaluru is the only I-League club to reach the AFC Cup final in 2016, losing to Al-Quwa Al-Jawiya of Iraq. However, in the AFC Champions League, no I-League club has ever managed to make it past the qualifiers.

Season	AFC Cup	Position	AFC Champions League	Position
2008–09	Mohun Bagan	Group stage	Dempo	Play-off Round
2008–09	Dempo	Semi-finals	Dempo	Play-off Round
2009–10	East Bengal	Group stage	Churchill Brothers	Play-off Round
2009–10	Churchill Brothers	Round of 16	Churchill Brothers	Play-off Round
2010–11	East Bengal	Group stage	Dempo	Play-off Round
2010–11	Dempo	Round of 16	Dempo	Play-off Round
2011–12	East Bengal	Group stage	Salgaocar	DNP
2011–12	Salgaocar	Group stage	Salgaocar	DNP
2012–13	East Bengal	Semi-finals	Churchill Brothers	DNP
2012–13	Churchill Brothers	Group stage	Churchill Brothers	DNP
2013–14	Churchill Brothers	Round of 16	Pune	Qualifying Round 1
2013–14	Pune	Group stage	Pune	Qualifying Round 1
2014–15	Bengaluru	Round of 16	Bengaluru	Preliminary Round 1
2014–15	East Bengal	Group stage	Bengaluru	Preliminary Round 1
2015–16	Mohun Bagan	Round of 16	Mohun Bagan	Preliminary Round 2
2015–16	Bengaluru	Runners-up	Mohun Bagan	Preliminary Round 2
2016–17	Bengaluru	Inter-zone finals	Bengaluru	Preliminary Round 2
2016–17	Mohun Bagan	Group stage	Bengaluru	Preliminary Round 2
2017–18	Aizawl	Group stage	Aizawl	Play-off Round
2017–18	Bengaluru	Inter-zone semi-finals	Aizawl	Play-off Round
2019	Minerva Punjab	Group stage	Minerva Punjab	Preliminary Round 2
2018–19	Chennai City	Cancelled	Chennai City	Preliminary Round 1
2019–20	Mohun Bagan	Inter-zone semi-finals		
2020–21	Gokulam Kerala	Group stage		

== See also ==
- Football in India
- History of Indian football
- List of football clubs in India
- Indian club qualifiers for 2023–24 AFC competitions
- IFA Shield
- NFL Second Division
- NFL Third Division
