= 2026 Super League Kerala =

3rd season of the Super League Kerala

Super League Kerala
- Season: 2026–27
- Dates: 25 September – 12 December 2026
- Shield Winners: Calicut; 1st title
- Matches: 26
- Goals: 74 (2.85 per match)
- Top goalscorer: Rahul Raju (6)
- Biggest home win: Calicut 5–0 Kannur Warriors (15 November 2026)
- Biggest away win: Malappuram 2–6 Calicut (1 November 2026)
- Highest scoring: Malappuram 2–6 Calicut (1 November 2026)
- Longest winning run: 3 games Calicut; Malappuram
- Longest unbeaten run: 4 games Calicut; Malappuram
- Longest winless run: 6 games Thrissur Magic
- Longest losing run: 5 games Kannur Warriors
- Highest attendance: 31,876; Calicut (4)1–1(3) Malappuram (2 October 2026); EMS Corporation Stadium
- Lowest attendance: 4,223; Kannur Warriors 2–3 Thiruvananthapuram Kombans (31 October 2026); Jawahar Municipal Stadium
- Total attendance: 186,807
- Average attendance: 9,832
- All statistics correct as of 21 November 2026.

The 2026 Super League Kerala is the third season of the Super League Kerala, a men's professional franchise football league in Kerala, India. It is organised by the Kerala Football Association and Scoreline Sports.

Calicut, who won the inaugural Super League Kerala title in 2024, became the first-ever winners of the newly introduced SLK Shield, securing the title with two rounds to spare. They thus became the first club to win both the title and the Shield.

Kannur Warriors are the defending title holders..

== Summary ==
=== Developments ===
Semi-final games will be conducted in the ‘home and away’ method from this season.

Draws will be avoided from the group stage itself by conducting a penalty shootout when scores are tied after 90 minutes of regular play. Teams that win the game in regular ninety minutes will receive 3 points. In case the game goes to penalties, the winner will receive 2 points and the loser gets 1 point.

From this season onwards,the table toppers will receive the brand new Super League Kerala Shield and will be the 'SLK League Shield Winners'.

== Teams ==
Locations of the SLK franchises

Team	City	Stadium	Capacity
Calicut	Kozhikode	EMS Stadium	50,000
Forca Kochi	Kochi	Jawaharlal Nehru Stadium	50,000
Kannur Warriors	Kannur	Jawahar Municipal Stadium	30,000
Malappuram	Malappuram	Payyanad Stadium	30,000
Thiruvananthapuram Kombans	Thiruvananthapuram	Chandrasekharan Nair Stadium	25,000
Thrissur Magic	Thrissur	Thrissur Municipal Corporation Stadium	15,000

== Personnel and sponsorship ==
Club	Coach	Captain	Kit manufacturer	Kit sponsors	
Club	Coach	Captain	Kit manufacturer	Main	Other(s)
Calicut	(Argentina) Ever Demaldé	(Argentina) Maximiliano Urruti (India) Prasanth Mohan (India) Manoj Markose	(India) Hyve Sports	Aster	List: Peekay Steel Castings; IBS Software; IBS futurepoint
Forca Kochi	(Belgium) Vital Borkelmans	(Argentina) Nahuel Pereyra	(India) Synder	QASH+	List: V-Guard; Hell
Kannur Warriors	(India) Shafeeq Hassan (interim)	(Cameroon) Ernesten Lavsamba (Spain) Asier Gomes (India) Muhammed Sinan	(India) Kaizen Sports	VERTEIL	List: Milma; KIMS Sreechand Hospital; Vismaya; The whole truth foods; Asset; Donut Factory; Nambiar Builders; DDC Pathlabs; IAM Studies
Malappuram	(Morocco) Karim Bencherifa	(South Africa) Bongani Zungu	(Denmark) Hummel	French Avenue	List: Kalliyath TMT; SAIFIT; The whole truth foods; Ajmi; Impex; Adi Group of Institutions
Thiruvananthapuram Kombans	(Australia) Ian Gillan	(India) Shinu R	(India) Hyve Sports	Adani	List
Thrissur Magic	(Spain) David Caneda	(India) Lenny Rodrigues	(India) SIFA	Magic Frames	List: SKILLBOX

=== Coaching changes ===
Club	Outgoing coach	Manner of departure	Date of vacancy	Position in the table	Incoming manager	Date of appointment	Reference
Kannur Warriors	(Spain) Manuel Sánchez Murias	End of Contract	23 July 2026	Pre-season	(Russia) Andrey Chernyshov	25 July 2026	
Thrissur Magic	(Russia) Andrey Chernyshov	End of contract	24 July 2026	Pre-season	(Spain) David Caneda	28 August 2026	
Malappuram	(India) Cleofas Alex	End of interim spell	27 July 2026	Pre-season	(Morocco) Karim Bencherifa	27 July 2026	
Thiruvananthapuram Kombans	(England) (Republic of Ireland) James McAloon	End of contract	27 July 2026	Pre-season	(Spain) Fernando Santiago Varela	18 August 2026	
Thiruvananthapuram Kombans	(Spain) Fernando Santiago Varela	Signed by Dhaka Mohammedan	19 August 2026	Pre-season	(Australia) Ian Gillan	6 September 2026	
Forca Kochi	(India) Sanush Raj	End of interim spell	22 August 2026	Pre-season	(Belgium) Vital Borkelmans	24 August 2026	
Kannur Warriors	(Russia) Andrey Chernyshov	Mutual consent	10 November 2026	6th	(India) Shafeeq Hassan (interim)	10 November 2026	

== Foreign players ==
There are no limitations on signing foreign players. A maximum of four can be fielded in a match at a time.

Club	Player 1	Player 2	Player 3	Player 4	Player 5	Player 6	Unregistered Player(s)	Former Player(s)
Calicut	(Argentina) Alexis Sosa	(Argentina) Agustín Villalobos	(Argentina) Federico Boasso	(Argentina) Máximo García	(Argentina) Maximiliano Urruti	(Brazil) Léo David		
Forca Kochi	(Argentina) Nahuel Pereyra	(Brazil) Éliton Júnior	(Brazil) Paulo Henrique	(Brazil) Renan Araújo	(Ivory Coast) Aubin Kouakou	(Mexico) Diego Hernández		
Kannur Warriors	(Bosnia and Herzegovina) Azer Kozić	(Cameroon) Ernesten Lavsamba	(Ghana) Frederick Ansah Botchway	(Serbia) Bogdan Stamenković	(Spain) Asier Gomes	(Spain) Varo Álvarez		(Spain) Gerard Artigas
Malappuram	(France) Amadou Soukouna	(Gabon) Grâce-Adieu Youmou	(Ghana) Abdul Samed Ango	(Morocco) Abdelhay Elforsy	(South Africa) Bongani Zungu	(Bosnia and Herzegovina) Nedim Hadžić	(Brazil) Paulo Victor (Morocco) Adnane Bentagana	
Thiruvananthapuram Kombans	(Angola) Norberto Emous	(Brazil) Patrick Mota	(Brazil) Paulo Cezar	(Portugal) Joao Parades	(Ghana) Stephen Acquah	(Ghana) Joseph Gordon		
Thrissur Magic	(Colombia) Bladmir Angulo	(Ghana) Samuel Amofa	(Nigeria) Valentine Ekejiuba	(Spain) Sergio Gil	(Venezuela) Henry Plazas			

== League table ==
Pos	Team	Pld	W	PKW	PKL	L	GF	GA	GD	Pts	Qualification
1	Calicut (Q, C)	8	6	1	0	1	19	8	+11	20	Shield Winners and advance to Semi Finals
2	Malappuram (Q)	9	5	0	2	2	20	11	+9	17	Advance to Semi Finals
3	Forca Kochi	9	3	2	0	4	12	11	+1	13	Advance to Semi Finals
4	Thiruvananthapuram Kombans	9	2	2	1	4	10	17	−7	11	Advance to Semi Finals
5	Kannur Warriors	9	3	0	1	5	7	16	−9	10	
6	Thrissur Magic	8	1	1	2	4	6	11	−5	7	

Updated to match(es) played on 21 November 2026. Source: Super League Kerala
(C) Champion; (Q) Qualified for Semi-finals

== Results ==
=== Fixtures and results ===
Home \ Away	CAL	FKO	KAN	MAL	TKO	THR
Calicut	—	0–3	5–0	1–1 (4–3)	2–0	
Forca Kochi		—	0–1	1–0	3–0	2–2 (4-2)
Kannur Warriors	0–1	2–1	—		2–3	1–0
Malappuram	2–6	3–0	3–0	—	3–0	4–0
Thiruvananthapuram	1–2	3–2	1–1 (3–0)	2–2 (4–2)	—	0–0 (3–4)
Thrissur Magic	1–2	0–0 (1–4)	2–0	1–2		—

Updated to match(es) played on 21 November 2026. Source: Super League Kerala
Legend: Blue = home team win; Yellow = draw; Red = away team win.

=== Results by match ===
The table lists the results of the teams after each match.

Match	1	2	3	4	5	6	7	8	9	10
Calicut	W	D	W	W	L	W	W	W		
Forca Kochi	W	D	L	W	W	D	L	L	L	
Kannur Warriors	W	D	W	L	L	L	L	L	W	
Malappuram	L	D	D	W	W	L	W	W	W	
Thiruvananthapuram	L	D	D	L	D	W	L	W	L	
Thrissur Magic	L	D	L	L	D	D	W	L		

Updated to match(es) played on 21 November 2026. Source: Super League Kerala
W = Win; D = Draw; L = Loss

=== Positions by round ===
The table lists the positions of teams after each round mentioned in official fixtures.

Team ╲ Round	1	2	3	4	5	6	7	8	9	10
Calicut	1	1	1	1	2	1	1	1	1	1
Forca Kochi	3	2	3	2	1	2	2	3	3	
Kannur Warriors	2	3	2	3	4	5	6	6		
Malappuram	4	5	5	4	3	3	3	2	2	2
Thiruvananthapuram	6	4	4	5	5	4	4	4	4	
Thrissur Magic	5	6	6	6	6	6	5	5		

Updated to match(es) played on 15 November 2026. Source: Super League Kerala

== Matches ==
=== Round 1 ===
25 September 2026	Kannur Warriors	1–0	Thrissur Magic	Kannur
19:30	Gomes 18'	Report		Stadium: Jawahar Municipal Stadium; Attendance: 11,255; Referee: Harish Kundu; Player of the Match: Asier Gomes (Kannur Warriors)

26 September 2026	Calicut	2–0	Thiruvananthapuram Kombans	Kozhikode
19:30	Prasanth 23'; Maximiliano 45+4'	Report		Stadium: EMS Stadium; Attendance: 12,286; Referee: K Ramdasan; Player of the Match: Federico Boasso (Calicut)

27 September 2026	Forca Kochi	1–0	Malappuram	Kochi
19:30	Rahul 90+4'	Report		Stadium: Jawaharlal Nehru Stadium; Attendance: 6,189; Referee: Fahad Yousaf Kappiarakath; Player of the Match: Rahul Raju (Forca Kochi)

=== Round 2 ===
1 October 2026	Thrissur Magic	0–0 (1–4 p)	Forca Kochi	Thrissur
19:30		Report		Stadium: Thrissur Municipal Corporation Stadium; Attendance: 7,443; Referee: Ashwin; Player of the Match: Jaimy Joy (Forca Kochi)
	Penalties
	Plazas (penalty missed); Abdul Samad (penalty scored); Muhammed Afsal (penalty missed)		(penalty scored) Diego; (penalty scored) Renan Araújo; (penalty scored) Pereyra; (penalty scored) Rahul

2 October 2026	Calicut	1–1 (4–3 p)	Malappuram	Kozhikode
19:30	Leo David 79'	Report	Lalhlimpuia 65'	Stadium: EMS Stadium; Attendance: 31,876; Referee: Mrutyunjay Lingaraj Amatya; Player of the Match: Mirshad Michu (Calicut)
	Penalties
	Léo David (penalty scored); Agustín Villalobos (penalty missed); Federico Boasso (penalty scored); Sosa (penalty scored); Tluangpuia (penalty scored)		(penalty scored) Abdul Samed Ango; (penalty missed) Abdelhay Elforsy; (penalty scored) Nedim; (penalty missed) Abith KB; (penalty scored) Grâce-Adieu Youmou

4 October 2026	Thiruvananthapuram Kombans	1–1 (3–0 p)	Kannur Warriors	Thiruvananthapuram
19:30	Muhammed Nisham 44'	Report	Botchway 80'	Stadium: Chandrasekharan Nair Stadium; Attendance: 7,868; Referee: Ajay Krishnan; Player of the Match: Arjun V. (Thiruvananthapuram Kombans)
	Penalties
	(penalty scored) Norberto Emous; (penalty scored) Patrick Mota; (penalty scored) Joao Parades		(penalty missed) Asier; (penalty missed) Ernesten Lavsamba; (penalty missed) Varo Álvarez

=== Round 3 ===
9 October 2026	Kannur Warriors	2–1	Forca Kochi	Kannur
19:30	Stamenković 39'; Faslu 49'	Report	Rahul 52'	Stadium: Jawahar Municipal Stadium; Attendance: 7,346; Referee: Fahad Yousaf Kappiarakath; Player of the Match: Faslu Rahman (Kannur Warriors)

10 October 2026	Thrissur Magic	1–2	Calicut	Thrissur
19:30	Silajit 61'	Report	Emil 1'; Samad 90+1'	Stadium: Thrissur Municipal Corporation Stadium; Attendance: 6,824; Referee: Senthil Nathan; Player of the Match: Manuel Agustín Villalobos (Calicut)

11 October 2026	Thiruvananthapuram Kombans	2–2 (4–2 p)	Malappuram	Thiruvananthapuram
19:30	Gordon 90+1'; Norberto 90+8'	Report	Soukouna 14'; Risvan 64'	Stadium: Chandrasekharan Nair Stadium; Attendance: 5,652; Referee: K Ramdasan; Player of the Match: Joseph Gordon (Thiruvananthapuram Kombans)
	Penalties
	(penalty scored) Norberto Emous; (penalty scored) João Paredes; (penalty scored) Patrick Mota; (penalty scored) Joseph Gordon		(penalty missed) Abdul Samed Ango; (penalty scored) Nedim; (penalty scored) Abdul Hakku; (penalty missed) Daniel

=== Round 4 ===
16 October 2026	Forca Kochi	3–0	Thiruvananthapuram Kombans	Kochi
19:30	Ragav 7'; Rahul 35'; Harshal 66'	Report		Stadium: Jawaharlal Nehru Stadium; Attendance: 4,295; Referee: Ajay Krishnan; Player of the Match: Renan Rocha Araujo (Forca Kochi)

17 October 2026	Malappuram	4–0	Thrissur Magic	Manjeri
19:30	Rashid 65', 73'; Mahdi 76'; Soukouna 90+7'	Report		Stadium: MDSC Stadium; Attendance: 16,564; Referee: Tejas Nagvenkar; Player of the Match: Rashid CK (Malappuram)

18 October 2026	Kannur Warriors	0–1	Calicut	Kannur
19:30		Report	Boasso 15'	Stadium: Jawahar Municipal Stadium; Attendance: 11,008; Referee: Ashwin; Player of the Match: Federico Boasso (Calicut)

=== Round 5 ===
23 October 2026	Thiruvananthapuram Kombans	0–0 (3–4 p)	Thrissur Magic	Thiruvananthapuram
19:30		Report		Stadium: Chandrasekharan Nair Stadium; Attendance: 4,625; Referee: Thomas Melbin; Player of the Match: Parthiv Km (Thiruvananthapuram Kombans)
	Penalties
	João Paredes (penalty scored); Shanu Stellas (penalty scored); Patrick Mota (penalty scored); Muhammed Nisham (penalty missed); Jamsheed Ali (penalty missed)		(penalty scored) Sergio Gil; (penalty scored) Shihas PM; (penalty scored) Muhammed Jiyad; (penalty missed) Abdul Samad; (penalty scored) Valentine Ekejiuba

24 October 2026	Calicut	0–3	Forca Kochi	Kozhikode
18:30		Report	Alan 37'; Rahul 80', 88'	Stadium: EMS Stadium; Attendance: 6,884; Referee: Ajay Krishnan; Player of the Match: Rahul Raju (Forca Kochi)

26 October 2026	Malappuram	3–0	Kannur Warriors	Manjeri
19:30	Soukouna 19'; Mahdi 48'; Rashid 66'	Report		Stadium: MDSC Stadium; Attendance: 14,624; Referee: Fahad Yousaf Kappiarakath; Player of the Match: Abdelhay Forsy (Malappuram)

=== Round 6 ===
30 October 2026	Forca Kochi	2–2 (4–2 p)	Thrissur Magic	Kochi
19:30	J. N. Pereyra 14'; R.Raju 64'	Report	Sergio Gil 59' (pen.); Sergio Gil 68' (pen.)	Stadium: Jawaharlal Nehru Stadium; Attendance: 6,218; Referee: Gibin Baby Kalarickal; Player of the Match: Éliton Júnior (Forca Kochi)
	Penalties
	Eliton Junior (penalty scored); Harshall Rahman (penalty scored); J. N. Pereyra (penalty scored); Paulo Henrique (penalty scored)		Sergio Gil (penalty scored); Senthamizhi S (penalty scored); Muhammed Jiyad (penalty missed); Muhammed Shihas (penalty missed)

31 October 2026	Kannur Warriors	2–3	Thiruvananthapuram Kombans	Kannur
19:30	Umasankar M 23'; Stamenković 49'	Report	João Paredes 6'; Shinu R 46'; Shanu 89'	Stadium: Jawahar Municipal Stadium; Attendance: 4,223; Referee: Tejas Nagvenkar; Player of the Match: Patrick Mota (Thiruvananthapuram Kombans)

1 November 2026	Malappuram	2–6	Calicut	Manjeri
19:30	Soukouna 49'; Hadzic 90+1'	Report	Thomas 40'; Sosa 43'; Léo David 45+1', 74'; Boasso 47', 79'	Stadium: MDSC Stadium; Attendance: 16,992; Referee: Senthil Nathan; Player of the Match: Léo David

=== Round 7 ===
6 November 2026	Malappuram	3–0	Forca Kochi	Manjeri
19:30	Abdelhay Elforsy 14'; Hadzic 27', 90+3'	Report		Stadium: MDSC Stadium; Player of the Match: Nedim Hadžić (Malappuram)

7 November 2026	Thrissur Magic	2–0	Kannur Warriors	Thrissur
19:30	Ekejiuba 7'; Silajit 51'	Report		Stadium: Thrissur Municipal Corporation Stadium; Attendance: 4,635; Referee: Thomas Melbin; Player of the Match: Valentine Ekejiuba (Thrissur Magic)

8 November 2026	Thiruvananthapuram Kombans	1–2	Calicut	Thiruvananthapuram
19:30	Sreeraj 51'	Report	Maximiliano Urruti 3'; David 51'	Stadium: Chandrasekharan Nair Stadium; Player of the Match: Léo David (Calicut)

=== Round 8 ===
13 November 2026	Thiruvananthapuram Kombans	3-2	Forca Kochi	Thiruvananthapuram
19:30	Sreeraj 34'; Arjun 65', 90'	Report	Nithin 23'; Paulo 90+1'	Stadium: Chandrasekharan Nair Stadium; Player of the Match: Arjun V (Thiruvananthapuram Kombans)

14 November 2026	Thrissur Magic	1-2	Malappuram	Thrissur
19:30	Silajit Santra 42+2'	Report	Abdelhay Elforsy 42'; Grace Adieu 86'	Stadium: Thrissur Municipal Corporation Stadium; Player of the Match: Abdelhay Elforsy (Malappuram)

15 November 2026	Calicut	5-0	Kannur Warriors	Kozhikode
19:30	Maximiliano 14', 47', 67'; Prasanth 40'; Léo David 51'	Report		Stadium: EMS Stadium; Player of the Match: Maximiliano Urruti (Calicut)

=== Round 9 ===
20 November 2026	Forca Kochi	0–1	Kannur Warriors	Kochi
19:30			Jobin 90'	Stadium: Jawaharlal Nehru Stadium; Player of the Match: Jobin Joseph (Kannur Warriors)

21 November 2026	Malappuram	3–0	Thiruvananthapuram Kombans	Manjeri
19:30	Rashid 11'; Victor 66'; Kennedy 68'			Stadium: MDSC Stadium

22 November 2026	Calicut	v	Thrissur Magic	Kozhikode
19:30				Stadium: EMS Stadium

=== Round 10 ===
25 November 2026	Kannur Warriors	v	Malappuram	Kannur
19:30				Stadium: Jawahar Municipal Stadium

26 November 2026	Forca Kochi	v	Calicut	Kochi
19:30				Stadium: Jawaharlal Nehru Stadium

27 November 2026	Thrissur Magic	v	Thiruvananthapuram Kombans	Thrissur
19:30				Stadium: Thrissur Municipal Corporation Stadium

== Season statistics ==
As of 21 November 2026

=== Top scorers ===
Rank	Player	Team	Goals
1	Rahul Raju	Forca Kochi	6
2	(Brazil) Léo David	Calicut	5
2	(Argentina) Maximiliano Urruti	Calicut	5
4	(France) Amadou Soukouna	Malappuram	4
4	Rashid CK	Malappuram	4
6	(Bosnia and Herzegovina) Nedim Hadžić	Malappuram	3
6	Silajit Santra	Thrissur Magic	3
6	(Argentina) Federico Boasso	Calicut	3
9	Prasanth Karuthadathkuni	Calicut	2
9	(Serbia) Bogdan Stamenković	Kannur Warriors	2
9	(Spain) Sergio Gil Latorre	Thrissur Magic	2
9	Muhamed Mahdi	Malappuram	2
9	(Morocco) Abdelhay Elforsy	Malappuram	2
9	Sreeraj K	Thiruvananthapuram Kombans	2
9	Arjun V	Thiruvananthapuram Kombans	2

=== Top assists ===
Rank	Player	Team	Assists
1	(Morocco) Abdelhay Forsy	Malappuram	6
2	Nijo Gilbert	Kannur Warriors	3
2	Arjun V	Thiruvananthapuram Kombans	3
2	(Argentina) Federico Boasso	Calicut	3
5	Calwin Thomas	Calicut	2
5	Emil Benny	Calicut	2
5	(Argentina) Maximiliano Urruti	Calicut	2
5	Muhammed Ashique K	Calicut	2
5	(Portugal) Joao Parades	Thiruvananthapuram Kombans	2
5	(Mexico) Diego Hernández	Forca Kochi	2
5	Rahul Raju	Forca Kochi	2
5	Harshal Rahman	Forca Kochi	2

=== Clean sheets ===
Rank	Player	Team	Clean sheets
1	Mohammed Arbaz	Malappuram	4
1	Jaimy Joy	Forca Kochi	3
1	Kamaludheen AK	Thrissur Magic	3
1	Mirshad Michu	Calicut	3
5	Hajmal Sakeer	Kannur Warriors	1
5	Prateek Kumar Singh	Kannur Warriors	1
5	Sapam Singh	Thiruvananthapuram Kombans	1

== Awards ==
=== Player of the Match ===
Player of the Match
Match	Player of the Match		Match	Player of the Match	
Match	Player	Club	Match	Player	Club
1	(Spain) Asier Gomes	Kannur Warriors	2	(Argentina) Federico Boasso	Calicut
3	Rahul Raju	Forca Kochi	4	Jaimy Joy	Forca Kochi
5	Mirshad Michu	Calicut	6	Arjun V	Thiruvananthapuram Kombans
7	Faslu Rahman	Kannur Warriors	8	(Argentina) Agustín Villalobos	Calicut
9	(Ghana) Joseph Gordon	Thiruvananthapuram Kombans	10	(Brazil) Renan Araújo	Forca Kochi
11	Rashid CK	Malappuram	12	(Argentina) Federico Boasso (2)	Calicut
13	Parthiv KM	Thiruvananthapuram Kombans	14	Rahul Raju (2)	Forca Kochi
15	(Morocco) Abdelhay Elforsy	Malappuram	16	(Brazil) Éliton Júnior	Forca Kochi
17	(Brazil) Patrick Mota	Thiruvananthapuram Kombans	18	(Brazil) Léo David	Calicut
19	(Bosnia and Herzegovina) Nedim Hadžić	Malappuram	20	(Nigeria) Valentine Ekejiuba	Thrissur Magic
21	(Brazil) Léo David (2)	Calicut	22	Arjun V (2)	Thiruvananthapuram Kombans
23	(Morocco) Abdelhay Elforsy (2)	Malappuram	24	(Argentina) Maximiliano Urruti	Calicut
25	Jobin Joseph	Kannur Warriors	26		
27			28		
29			30		

== Attendance ==
=== Regular season ===
Pos	Team	Total	High	Low	Average	Change
1	Calicut	51,046	31,876	6,884	17,015	−19.4%
2	Malappuram	48,180	16,992	14,624	16,060	−9.6%
3	Kannur Warriors	33,832	11,255	4,223	8,458	−43.3%
4	Thrissur Magic	18,902	7,443	4,635	6,301	−9.5%
5	Thiruvananthapuram Kombans	18,145	7,868	4,625	6,048	−12.8%
6	Forca Kochi	16,702	6,218	4,295	5,567	+71.9%
	League total	186,807	31,876	4,223	9,832	−16.8%

Source: Super League Kerala

=== By home matches ===
Team \ Home Game	1	2	3	4	5	Total
Calicut	12,286	31,876	6,884			51,046
Malappuram	16,564	14,624	16,992			48,180
Kannur Warriors	11,255	7,346	11,008	4,223		33,832
Thrissur Magic	7,443	6,824	4,635			18,902
Thiruvananthapuram Kombans	7,868	5,652	4,625			18,145
Forca Kochi	6,189	4,295	6,218			16,702

Legend: Highest Lowest
