= 2025 Super League Kerala =

1st season of the Super League Kerala

Super League Kerala
- Season: 2025–26
- Dates: 2 October – 19 December 2025
- Champions: Kannur Warriors
- Matches: 33
- Goals: 87 (2.64 per match)
- Best player: Muhammed Ajsal
- Top goalscorer: John Kennedy (8 Goals)
- Best goalkeeper: Kamaludheen
- Biggest home win: Malappuram FC 4–2 Forca Kochi (4 December 2025)
- Biggest away win: Forca Kochi 2–6 Calicut (9 November 2025)
- Highest scoring: Forca Kochi 2–6 Calicut (9 November 2025)
- Longest winning run: Calicut (4 matches)
- Longest unbeaten run: Calicut (6 matches)
- Longest winless run: Forca Kochi (7 matches)
- Longest losing run: Forca Kochi (7 matches)
- Highest attendance: 34,137; Calicut 3–1 Malappuram (24 November 2025)
- Lowest attendance: 2,500; Forca Kochi 0–1 Thiruvananthapuram Kombans (15 November 2025)
- Total attendance: 547,693
- Average attendance: 16,597

The 2025 Super League Kerala was the second season of the Super League Kerala, a men's professional franchise football league in Kerala, India. It was organised by the Kerala Football Association and Scoreline Sports. The Super League Kerala (SLK) launched its second season with a curtain raiser at Al Ahli Sports Hall, Al Nahda, Dubai.

== Teams ==
Locations of the SLK franchises

Team	City	Stadium	Capacity
Calicut	Kozhikode	EMS Stadium	50,000
Forca Kochi	Kochi	Maharaja's College Stadium	6,000
Kannur Warriors	Kannur	Jawahar Municipal Stadium	30,000
Malappuram	Malappuram	Payyanad Stadium	30,000
Thiruvananthapuram Kombans	Thiruvananthapuram	Chandrasekharan Nair Stadium	25,000
Thrissur Magic	Thrissur	Thrissur Municipal Corporation Stadium	15,000

== Personnel and sponsorship ==
Club	Head coach	Captain	Kit manufacturer	Shirt sponsor
Calicut	(Argentina) Ever Demaldé	(India) Prasanth Mohan	(India) Hyve Sports	Aster
Forca Kochi	(India) Sanush Raj (interim)	(Algeria) Rachid Aït-Atmane	(India) Synder	QASH+
Kannur Warriors	(Spain) Manuel Sánchez Murias	(Cameroon) Ernesten Lavsamba	(India) Kaizen Sports	KIMS Sreechand Hospital
Malappuram	(India) Cleofas Alex (interim)	(India) Faslu Rahman	(Denmark) Hummel	Rapheal Film City
Thiruvananthapuram Kombans	(England) (Republic of Ireland) James McAloon	(Brazil) Patrick Mota	(India) Hyve Sports	Adani
Thrissur Magic	(Russia) Andrey Chernyshov	(Brazil) Maílson Alves	(India) SIFA	Magic Frames

=== Managerial changes ===
Team	Outgoing manager	Manner of departure	Date of vacancy	Position in the table	Incoming manager	Date of appointment	Reference
Malappuram	(England) John Gregory	Contract Finished	3 August 2025	Pre-season	(Spain) Miguel Corral	3 August 2025	
Calicut	(Australia) Ian Gillan	Contract Finished	8 March 2025	Pre-season	(Argentina) Ever Demaldé	20 August 2025	
Thrissur Magic	(Italy) Giovanni Scanu	Contract Finished	8 March 2025	Pre-season	(Russia) Andrey Chernyshov	23 August 2025	
Forca Kochi	(Portugal) Mário Lemos	Contract Finished	8 March 2025	Pre-season	(Spain) Miki Lladó	9 September 2025	
Thiruvananthapuram	(Brazil) Sérgio Alexandre	Contract Finished	8 March 2025	Pre-season	(England) (Republic of Ireland) James McAloon	13 September 2025	
Forca Kochi	(Spain) Miki Lladó	Mutual consent	11 November 2025	6th	(India) Sanush Raj (interim)	11 November 2025	
Malappuram	(Spain) Miguel Corral	Mutual consent	22 November 2025	5th	(India) Cleofas Alex (interim)	24 November 2025	

== Foreign players ==
There are no limitations on signing foreign players. A maximum of four can be fielded in a match at a time.

Club	Player 1	Player 2	Player 3	Player 4	Player 5	Player 6	Player 7	Player 8	Player 9
Calicut	(Argentina) Alexis Sosa	(Argentina) Federico Boasso	(Argentina) Nahuel Pereyra	(Brazil) Bruno Cantanhede	(Brazil) Yuri de Oliveira	(Colombia) Sebastián Rincón	(Ghana) Richard Osei	(Paraguay) Enrique Borja	
Forca Kochi	(Algeria) Rachid Aït-Atmane	(Brazil) Douglas Tardin	(Colombia) Luis Rodríguez	(Curaçao) Gino van Kessel	(Spain) Iker Hernández	(Spain) Ramón Riego García	(Uganda) Amos Kirya	(Spain) Marc Vargas	(Spain) Cadete
Kannur Warriors	(Argentina) Nicolás Delmonte	(Cameroon) Ernesten Lavsamba	(Senegal) Abdou Karim Samb	(Spain) Adrián Sardinero	(Spain) Asier Gomes	(Tunisia) Mohamed Nidhal Said			
Malappuram	(Argentina) Facundo Ballardo	(Brazil) John Kennedy	(Fiji) Roy Krishna	(Morocco) Badr Boulahroud	(Morocco) Abdelhay El Forsy	(Spain) Aitor Aldalur	(Spain) Sergio González Álvarez	(Spain) Xiker	(Tajikistan) Komron Tursunov
Thiruvananthapuram Kombans	(Brazil) Pemaza	(Brazil) Filipe Alves	(Brazil) Patrick Mota	(Brazil) Paulo Victor	(Brazil) Ronald Makalysten	(Brazil) Iury De Carvalho	(Brazil) Renan Januario		
Thrissur Magic	(Brazil) Maílson	(Ghana) Francis Addo	(Serbia) Ivan Marković	(Serbia) Dejan Uzelac	(Trinidad and Tobago) Marcus Joseph	(Colombia) Kevin Padilla			

== League table ==
Pos	Team	Pld	W	D	L	GF	GA	GD	Pts	Qualification
1	Calicut	10	7	2	1	21	11	+10	23	Advance to Playoffs
2	Thrissur Magic	10	5	2	3	8	7	+1	17	Advance to Playoffs
3	Malappuram	10	3	5	2	18	15	+3	14	Advance to Playoffs
4	Kannur Warriors (W)	10	3	4	3	13	15	−2	13	Advance to Playoffs
5	Thiruvananthapuram Kombans	10	3	3	4	11	11	0	12	
6	Forca Kochi	10	1	0	9	10	22	−12	3	

Source: Super League Kerala
(W) Super League Kerala Cup winners

== Results ==
=== Fixtures and results ===
Home \ Away	CAL	FKO	KAN	MAL	TKO	THR
Calicut	—	2–1	1–1	3–1	1–0	0–1
Forca Kochi	2–6	—	0–1	1–4	0–1	0–1
Kannur Warriors	1–2	1–4	—	2–2	1–3	1–1
Malappuram	3–3	4–2	0–0	—	1–1	1–0
Thiruvananthapuram	1–2	1–0	2–3	1–1	—	0–1
Thrissur Magic	0–1	1–0	0–2	2–1	1–1	—

Source: Super League Kerala
Legend: Blue = home team win; Yellow = draw; Red = away team win.

=== Results by match ===
The table lists the results of the teams after each match.

Match	1	2	3	4	5	6	7	8	9	10
Calicut	W	L	D	D	W	W	W	W	W	W
Forca Kochi	L	L	L	L	L	L	L	W	L	L
Kannur Warriors	W	D	W	D	D	L	D	L	L	W
Malappuram	W	D	D	D	W	L	D	L	D	W
Thiruvananthapuram	L	W	L	D	L	W	W	D	D	L
Thrissur Magic	L	W	W	W	D	W	L	D	W	L

Source: Super League Kerala
W = Win; D = Draw; L = Loss

=== Positions by round ===
The table lists the positions of teams after each round mentioned in official fixtures.

Team ╲ Round	1	2	3	4	5	6	7	8	9	10
Calicut	2	4	4	4	4	2	1	1	1	1
Forca Kochi	5	6	6	6	6	6	6	6	6	6
Kannur Warriors	1	1	1	2	3	4	5	5	5	4
Malappuram	3	2	3	3	2	3	3	4	4	3
Thiruvananthapuram	4	3	5	5	5	5	4	3	3	5
Thrissur Magic	6	5	2	1	1	1	2	2	2	2

Source: Super League Kerala

== Matches ==
=== Round 1 ===
2 October 2025	Calicut	2–1	Forca Kochi	Kozhikode
19:30	Rincón 15' (pen.); Arun Kumar 90+1'	Report	Tardin 88'	Stadium: EMS Stadium; Attendance: 21,909; Player of the Match: Arun Kumar (Calicut)

3 October 2025	Malappuram	1–0	Thrissur Magic	Manjeri
19:30	Krishna 72' (pen.)	Report		Stadium: Payyanad Stadium; Attendance: 14,263; Player of the Match: Roy Krishna (Malappuram)

5 October 2025	Thiruvananthapuram Kombans	2–3	Kannur Warriors	Thiruvananthapuram
19:30	Autemar Bispo 52' (pen.); Viknesh Maria 90+6'	Report	Shijin T 28'; Filipe Alves 74' (o.g.); Abdou Karim Samb 90+2'	Stadium: Chandrasekharan Nair Stadium; Attendance: 7,452; Player of the Match: Shijin T (Kannur Warriors)

=== Round 2 ===
10 October 2025	Thiruvananthapuram Kombans	1–0	Forca Kochi	Thiruvananthapuram
19:30	Paulo Víctor 74'	Report		Stadium: Chandrasekharan Nair Stadium; Attendance: 6,452; Player of the Match: Paulo Víctor (Thiruvananthapuram Kombans)

11 October 2025	Calicut	0–1	Thrissur Magic	Kozhikode
19:30		Report	Maílson 35'	Stadium: EMS Stadium; Attendance: 20,276; Player of the Match: Maílson Alves (Thrissur Magic)

12 October 2025	Malappuram	0–0	Kannur Warriors	Manjeri
19:30		Report		Stadium: MDSC Stadium; Attendance: 14,718; Player of the Match: Muhammed Azhar (Malappuram)

=== Round 3 ===
17 October 2025	Thiruvananthapuram Kombans	0–1	Thrissur Magic	Thiruvananthapuram
19:30		Report	Maílson 21'	Stadium: Chandrasekharan Nair Stadium; Attendance: 6,491; Player of the Match: Maílson Alves (Thrissur Magic)

19 October 2025	Malappuram	3–3	Calicut	Manjeri
19:30	Aitor 45+3'; Nithin 86'; John Kennedy 89'	Report	Ajsal 7', 72'; Prasanth 50'	Stadium: MDSC Stadium; Attendance: 22,956; Player of the Match: Muhammad Ajsal (Calicut)

24 October 2025	Forca Kochi	0–1	Kannur Warriors	Kochi
19:30		Report	Sardinero 83'	Stadium: Maharaja College Stadium; Player of the Match: Adrián Sardinero (Kannur Warriors)

=== Round 4 ===
28 October 2025	Malappuram	1–1	Thiruvananthapuram Kombans	Manjeri
19:30	John Kennedy 69'	Report	Autemar Bispo 76'	Stadium: MDSC Stadium; Attendance: 21,426; Player of the Match: Aaryan Saroha (Thiruvananthapuram Kombans)

29 October 2025	Calicut	1–1	Kannur Warriors	Kozhikode
19:30	M. Arshaf 28'	Report	Asier Gomes 38'	Stadium: EMS Stadium; Attendance: 16,089; Player of the Match: M. Arshaf (Calicut)

31 October 2025	Forca Kochi	0–1	Thrissur Magic	Kochi
19:30		Report	M. Afsal 90'	Stadium: Maharaja College Stadium; Player of the Match: M. Afsal (Thrissur Magic)

=== Round 5 ===
2 November 2025	Calicut	1–0	Thiruvananthapuram Kombans	Kozhikode
19:30	Alexis Sosa 16'	I-League		Stadium: EMS Stadium; Attendance: 13,083; Player of the Match: Prasanth Karuthadathkuni (Calicut)

4 November 2025	Forca Kochi	1–4	Malappuram	Kochi
19:30	E. Sajeesh 64'	Report	Roy Krishna 38' (pen.); John Kennedy 48', 53'; Abdul Hakku 90+4'	Stadium: Maharaja College Stadium; Attendance: 4,998; Player of the Match: John Kennedy (Malappuram)

7 November 2025	Kannur Warriors	1–1	Thrissur Magic	Kannur
19:30	Sinan Muhammed 57'	Report	Ajayan Bibin 90+6'	Stadium: Jawahar Municipal Stadium

=== Round 6 ===
9 November 2025	Forca Kochi	2–6	Calicut	Kochi
19:30	van Kessel 68', 90+3'	Report	Ajsal ((18), 33', 44'; Prasanth 39', 87'; Doungel 84'	Stadium: Maharaja's College Stadium; Player of the Match: Muhammad Ajsal (Calicut)

10 November 2025	Kannur Warriors	1–3	Thiruvananthapuram Kombans	Kannur
19:30	Gomes 90+7'	Report	Mohammed Jasim 46'; Autemar Evangelista 68', 84'	Stadium: Jawahar Municipal Stadium; Player of the Match: Autemar Evangelista (Thiruvananthapuram Kombans)

14 November 2025	Thrissur Magic	2–1	Malappuram	Thrissur
19:30	Marković 3'; Faiaz Sk 26'	Report	John Kennedy Xavier Da Costa 5'	Stadium: Thrissur Municipal Corporation Stadium; Player of the Match: Laxmikant Kattimani (Thrissur Magic)

=== Round 7 ===
15 November 2025	Forca Kochi	0–1	Thiruvananthapuram Kombans	Kochi
19:30		Report	Kalid Roshan 16'	Stadium: Maharaja's College Stadium; Player of the Match: Abdul Badish (Thiruvananthapuram Kombans)

18 November 2025	Thrissur Magic	0–1	Calicut	Thrissur
19:30		Report	Federico Boasso 85'	Stadium: Thrissur Municipal Corporation Stadium; Player of the Match: Federico Boasso (Calicut)

19 November 2025	Kannur Warriors	2–2	Malappuram	Kannur
19:30	Muhammed Sinan 31'; Said Mohamed Nidhal 66'	Report	Abdul Hakku Nediyodath 42'; Aitor Aldalur 47'	Stadium: Jawahar Municipal Stadium; Player of the Match: Said Mohamed Nidhal (Kannur Warriors)

=== Round 8 ===
21 November 2025	Thrissur Magic	1–1	Thiruvananthapuram Kombans	Thrissur
19:30	Faisal Ali 15'	Report	Paulo Victor 4'	Stadium: Thrissur Municipal Corporation Stadium; Player of the Match: Paulo Victor (Thiruvananthapuram Kombans)

23 November 2025	Kannur Warriors	1–4	Forca Kochi	Kannur
19:30	Muhammed Sinan 4'	Report	Sajeesh E 15'; Nijo Gilbert 35', 48'; Abith K B 66'	Stadium: Jawahar Municipal Stadium; Player of the Match: Nijo Gilbert (Forca Kochi)

24 November 2025	Calicut	3–1	Malappuram	Kozhikode
19:30	Pereyra 12'; Ajsal 88'; Federico Boasso 90+2'	Report	Aldalur 80'	Stadium: EMS Stadium; Attendance: 34,137

=== Round 9 ===
27 November 2025	Thrissur Magic	1–0	Forca Kochi	Thrissur
19:30	Kevin Padilla 28'	Report		Stadium: Thrissur Municipal Corporation Stadium; Player of the Match: Kevin Padilla (Thrissur Magic)

28 November 2025	Kannur Warriors	1–2	Calicut	Kannur
19:30	Sardinero 74'	Report	Rincón 23'; Muhammed K Ashique 65'	Stadium: Jawahar Municipal Stadium; Player of the Match: Ajay Alex (Calicut)

30 November 2025	Thiruvananthapuram Kombans	1–1	Malappuram	Thiruvananthapuram
19:30	Paulo Victor 49'	Report	Forsy Abdelhay 18'	Stadium: Chandrasekharan Nair Stadium; Player of the Match: Forsy Abdelhay (Malappuram)

=== Round 10 ===
2 December 2025	Thrissur Magic	0–2	Kannur Warriors	Thrissur
19:30		Report	Gomes 42'; Ebindas Yesudasan 90+7'	Stadium: Thrissur Municipal Corporation Stadium; Player of the Match: Muhammed Sinan (Kannur Warriors)

3 December 2025	Thiruvananthapuram Kombans	1–2	Calicut	Thiruvananthapuram
19:30	Paulo Victor 16'	Report	Rincón 90+5'; Muhammad Ajsal 90+12'	Stadium: Chandrasekharan Nair Stadium; Player of the Match: Sebastián Rincón (Calicut)

4 December 2025	Malappuram	4–2	Forca Kochi	Manjeri
19:30	John Kennedy 33', 45+5', 49'; Pandita 88'	Report	Abith K B 9'; Jesuraj 27'	Stadium: MDSC Stadium; Player of the Match: John Kennedy (Malappuram)

== Playoffs ==
The top four clubs will qualify for the semi-finals.

Semi-finals
Calicut	0
Kannur Warriors	1
Thrissur Magic	3
Malappuram	1

Final
Kannur Warriors	1
Thrissur Magic	0

=== Semi-finals ===
14 December 2025
19:30

Calicut	0–1	Kannur Warriors
	Report	Sinan 71'

EMS Stadium, Kozhikode

15 December 2025
19:30

Thrissur Magic	3–1	Malappuram
Marcus 26', 84', 90+5'	Report	El Forsy 45+1'

Corporation Stadium, Thrissur

=== Final ===
19 December 2025
19:30

Kannur Warriors	1–0	Thrissur Magic
Gomes 19' (pen.)	Report

Jawahar Municipal Stadium, Kannur

== Season statistics ==
=== Top goalscorers ===
As of 4 November 2025

Rank	Player	Club	Goals
1	(Brazil) John Kennedy	Malappuram	8
2	(India) Muhammad Ajsal	Calicut	7
3	(Brazil) Autemar Bispo	Thiruvananthapuram Kombans	4
3	(India) Muhammed Sinan	Kannur Warriors	4
3	(Brazil) Paulo Victor	Thiruvananthapuram Kombans	4

=== Clean sheets ===
Rank	Player	Club	Clean sheets
1	(India) Kamaludheen AK	Thrissur Magic	3
2	(India) Muhammed Azhar	Malappuram	2
2	(India) Ubaid CK	Kannur Warriors	2
4	(India) Aaryan Saroha	Thiruvananthapuram Kombans	1
4	(India) Hajmal Sakeer	Calicut	1

== Attendance and Viewership ==
=== Regular season ===
Pos	Team	Total	High	Low	Average	Change
1	Calicut FC	105,577	34,134	13,083	21,115	+83.0%
2	Malappuram FC	88,836	22,956	14,263	17,767	+52.7%
3	Kannur Warriors FC	74,596	19,656	16,885	14,919	+196.8%
4	Thrissur Magic FC	34,820	7,452	6,453	6,964	+73.4%
5	Thiruvananthapuram Kombans FC	34,693	7,452	6,453	6,939	−13.8%
6	Forca Kochi FC	16,191	4,998	3,673	3,238	−64.7%
	League total	354,713	34,134	3,673	11,823	+43.0%

=== Viewership and broadcast reach ===
According to figures released by the league organizers, the 2025 season recorded significant audience growth across both television and digital streaming platforms, accumulating a combined 35.52 million viewers across 33 fixtures—an average of approximately 1.08 million viewers per match.

2025 Super League Kerala broadcast and digital reach
Medium	Platform(s)	Total reach	Average per match (33 matches)	Comparison to Season 1
Television	Sony Sports Network, DD Malayalam, E-Vision	25.32 million	0.77 million	▲98.4%
Digital / OTT	Sports.com, YouTube	10.20 million	0.31 million	▲269.6%
Total (Broadcast & OTT)	—	35.52 million	1.08 million	▲128.9%
Social media (excl. X)	Instagram, Facebook, and related handles	169.75 million	—	▲157.2%
