= 2026–27 Calicut FC season =

Indian football club season

Calicut
2026–27 season
- Owner: Futurepoint Sports and Entertainment PVT.LTD
- Chairman: VK Mathews
- Head coach: Ever Demaldé
- Stadium: EMS Stadium
- I-League 3: TBD
- Super League Kerala: TBD
- All statistics correct as of 28 July 2026.

The 2026–27 season will be Calicut's third since its establishment in 2024 and their first in the I-League 3, following promotion from the Kerala Premier League in the preceding season. In addition to the domestic league, the club also compete in the Super League Kerala.

== Current technical staff ==
Position	Name
Head coach	(Argentina) Ever Demaldé
Assistant coach	(India) Biby Thomas
Goalkeeping coach	(India) Nelson MV
Strength & conditioning coach	(India) Abhijith AP
Physio	(India) Sayyid Ahammed Nasal Gifri PK
Performance Analyst	(India) Abhinadan Mohanta
Masseur	(India) Bijesh P

== Players ==
=== First-team squad ===
As of 24 September 2026

Note: Flags indicate national team as defined under FIFA eligibility rules; some limited exceptions apply. Players may hold more than one non-FIFA nationality.

No.	Pos.	Nation	Player
1	GK	IND	Debnath Mondal
2	DF	IND	Tluangpuia
6	DF	ARG	Alexis Sosa
7	MF	ARG	Máximo García
9	FW	BRA	Léo David
10	MF	ARG	Federico Boasso
11	FW	IND	Gani Nigam
12	MF	IND	Naseeb Rahman
13	FW	IND	Ajith KR
14	MF	IND	Arun Kumar
15	MF	IND	Emil Benny
17	MF	IND	Andrews A
18	MF	IND	Riyas PT
19	FW	IND	Muhammed Ashique
21	GK	IND	Bishorjit Singh
22	MF	ARG	Agustín Villalobos

No.	Pos.	Nation	Player
23	GK	IND	Fayad Firoz
24	DF	IND	Muhammed Ameen
25	DF	IND	Cirin Varghese
28	FW	IND	Prasanth Mohan
29	FW	IND	Calwin Thomas
31	DF	IND	Manoj Markose
32	GK	IND	Mirshad Michu
37	FW	ARG	Maximiliano Urruti
45	MF	IND	Anin Muhammed
47	FW	IND	Muhammed Roshal
60	MF	IND	Girik Khosla
77	FW	IND	Muhammed Shadhil
79	MF	IND	Jobin T
80	MF	IND	Ajad Shaheem
99	DF	IND	Ankit Mukherjee
—	DF	IND	Mohammed Jasim

=== Other Players Under Contract ===
Note: Flags indicate national team as defined under FIFA eligibility rules; some limited exceptions apply. Players may hold more than one non-FIFA nationality.

No.	Pos.	Nation	Player
—	DF	IND	Henry Joseph
—	DF	IND	Sachin Dev
—	MF	IND	Lalremruata
—	FW	IND	Junain Kadavalath
—	MF	IND	Muhammed Rashid
—	MF	IND	Arjun Jayaraj
—	DF	IND	Arap Konyak
—	FW	IND	Rifhath Ramzan
—	FW	IND	Shamnad KP
—	FW	IND	Muhammed Sanaf
—	DF	IND	Muhammed Aslam
—	FW	IND	Adam David

No.	Pos.	Nation	Player
—	MF	IND	Yhoto Lohe
—	FW	IND	Rahul Venu
—	FW	IND	Antony K Paulose
—	GK	IND	Muhammed Anas
—	GK	IND	Aalok Tishrei Mathew
—	DF	IND	Ningthoujam Lanchenba
—	MF	IND	Abu Swalih

== Transfers and contracts ==
=== Transfers in ===
Date	Pos.	Player	Transferred From	Fee	References
22 August 2026	FW	Calwin Thomas	Real Malabar	Free Transfer	
23 August 2026	FW	Prasanth Mohan	Inter Kashi	Free Transfer	
24 August 2026	MF	Riyas PT	Real Malabar	Free Transfer	
26 August 2026	GK	Fayad Firoz	Muthoot FA	Free Transfer	
30 August 2026	MF	Emil Benny	Gokulam Kerala	Free Transfer	
31 August 2026	DF	Mohammed Jasim	Mohammedan	Free Transfer	
31 August 2026	MF	Naseeb Rahman	East Bengal B	Free Transfer	
02 September 2026	MF	Andrews A	East Bengal B	Free Transfer	
03 September 2026	MF	Girik Khosla	Diamond Harbour	Free Transfer	
04 September 2026	FW	Muhammed Shadhil	Thrissur Magic	Free Transfer	
04 September 2026	MF	Anin Muhammed	East Bengal B	Free Transfer	
05 September 2026	FW	Muhammed Ashique	East Bengal B	Free Transfer	
06 September 2026	GK	Mirshad Michu	Diamond Harbour	Free Transfer	
07 September 2026	MF	(Argentina) Federico Boasso		Free Transfer	
08 September 2026	DF	Tluangpuia	Delhi	Free Transfer	
09 September 2026	DF	(Argentina) Alexis Sosa		Free Transfer	
10 September 2026	CF	(Brazil) Léo David	(Brazil) Nova Iguaçu-RJ	Free Transfer	
15 September 2026	FW	(Argentina) Maximiliano Urruti	(United States) MLS Pool	Free Transfer	
16 September 2026	MF	(Argentina) Máximo García	(Argentina) CA Barracas Central II	Free Transfer	
16 September 2026	GK	(India) Debnath Mondal	(India) Samaleswari SC	Free Transfer	
17 September 2026	MF	(Argentina) Agustín Villalobos	(Argentina) FADEP II	Free Transfer	
24 September 2026	DF	(India) Ankit Mukherjee	(India) Chennaiyin	Free Transfer	
24 September 2026	MF	(India) Jobin T	(India) LIFFA	Free Transfer	

=== Transfers Out ===
Date	Pos.	Player	Transferred To	Fee	References
22 August 2026	MF	Hashir V	Malappuram	Free Transfer	
06 September 2026	MF	Nithin Madhu	Forca Kochi	Free Transfer	
17 September 2026	DF	Sandeep S	Thrissur Magic	Free Transfer	
20 September 2026	GK	Parthiv KM	Thrissur Magic	Free Transfer	

=== Released / out of contract ===
Date	Pos.	Player	Subsequent club	Fee	References

== Competitions ==
=== Super League Kerala ===
==== Matches ====
26 September 2026	Calicut	2-0	Thiruvananthapuram Kombans	Kozhikode
19:30	Prasanth 23'; Maximiliano 45+4'	Report		Stadium: EMS Stadium

01 October 2026	Calicut	1-1 (4–3 p)	Malappuram	Kozhikode
19:30	Leo David 79'	Report	Lalhlimpuia 65'	Stadium: EMS Stadium
	Penalties
	Léo David (penalty scored); Agustín Villalobos (penalty missed); Federico Boasso (penalty scored); Sosa (penalty scored); Tluangpuia (penalty scored)		(penalty scored) Abdul Samed Ango; (penalty missed) Abdelhay Elforsy; (penalty scored) Nedim; (penalty missed) Abith KB; (penalty scored) Grâce-Adieu Youmou

10 October 2026	Thrissur Magic	1-2	Calicut	Thrissur
19:30	Silajit Santra 61'; Abdul Samad PP 90+1' (o.g.)	Report	Emil Benny 1'	Stadium: Thrissur Municipal Corporation Stadium

18 October 2026	Kannur Warriors	0-1	Calicut	Kannur
19:30		Report	Federico Boasso 15'	Stadium: Jawahar Municipal Stadium; Player of the Match: Federico Boasso

24 October 2026	Calicut	v	Forca Kochi	Kozhikode
18:30				Stadium: EMS Stadium

01 November 2026	Malappuram	v	Calicut	Manjeri
19:30				Stadium: MDSC Stadium

08 November 2026	Thiruvananthapuram Kombans	v	Calicut	Thiruvananthapuram
19:30				Stadium: Chandrasekharan Nair Stadium

15 November 2026	Calicut	v	Kannur Warriors	Kozhikode
19:30				Stadium: EMS Stadium

22 November 2026	Calicut	v	Thrissur Magic	Kozhikode
19:30				Stadium: EMS Stadium

26 November 2026	Forca Kochi	v	Calicut	Kochi
19:30				Stadium: Jawaharlal Nehru Stadium

== Statistics ==
=== Goalscorers ===
Rank	Nation	Name	No.	Position(s)	SLK	KPL	Total
1	(Brazil)	Léo David	9	FW	1	0	1
1	(Argentina)	Federico Boasso	10	MF	1	0	1
1	(India)	Emil Benny	15	FW	1	0	1
1	(India)	Prasanth Mohan	28	FW	1	0	1
1	(Argentina)	Maximiliano Urruti	37	FW	1	0	1

=== Clean Sheets ===
Rank	No.	Nation	Name	SLK	KPL	Total
1	32	(India)	Mirshad Michu	2	0	2
