= 2024 Super League Kerala =

1st season of the Super League Kerala

Super League Kerala
- Season: 2024–25
- Dates: 7 September – 10 November
- Champions: Calicut
- Matches: 32
- Goals: 81 (2.53 per match)
- Top goalscorer: Dori (5 goals)
- Biggest home win: Kannur Warriors 4–3 Malappuram (27 October 2024)
- Biggest away win: Thiruvananthapuram Kombans 1–4 Calicut (6 October 2024)
- Highest scoring: Kannur Warriors 4–3 Malappuram (27 October 2024)
- Longest unbeaten run: Calicut (8 matches)
- Longest winless run: Thrissur Magic (8 matches)
- Total attendance: 451,892
- Average attendance: 13,694

The 2024 Mahindra Super League Kerala was the inaugural season of the Super League Kerala, a men's professional franchise football league in Kerala, India. It was organised by the Kerala Football Association and Scoreline Sports. It featured 6 clubs and matches were held at four venues across Kerala. The inaugural season kicked off on 7 September 2024.

== Teams ==
Locations of the SLK franchises

| Team | City | Stadium | Capacity |
|---|---|---|---|
| Calicut | Kozhikode | EMS Corporation Stadium | 50,000 |
| Forca Kochi | Kochi | Jawaharlal Nehru Stadium | 41,000 |
| Kannur Warriors | Kannur | EMS Corporation Stadium | 50,000 |
| Malappuram | Malappuram | Payyanad Stadium | 30,000 |
| Thiruvananthapuram Kombans | Thiruvananthapuram | Chandrasekharan Nair Stadium | 25,000 |
| Thrissur Magic | Thrissur | Payyanad Stadium | 30,000 |

== Personnel and sponsorship ==
| Club | Head coach | Captain | Kit manufacturer | Shirt sponsor |
|---|---|---|---|---|
| Calicut | (Australia) Ian Gillan | (India) Jijo Joseph | (India) Hyve Sports | Aster |
| Forca Kochi | (Portugal) Mário Lemos | (India) Subhasish Roy Chowdhury | (India) Synder | Steelex TMT |
| Kannur Warriors | (Spain) Manuel Sánchez Murias | (Spain) Adrián Sardinero | (India) Kaizen Sports | United Imaging |
| Malappuram | (England) John Gregory | (India) Anas Edathodika | (Denmark) Hummel | Impex |
| Thiruvananthapuram Kombans | (Brazil) Sérgio Alexandre | (Brazil) Patrick Mota | (India) Hyve Sports | Adani |
| Thrissur Magic | (Italy) Giovanni Scanu | (India) C. K. Vineeth | (India) SIFA | Magic Frames |

== Foreign players ==
The AIFF allows clubs to register a maximum of six foreign players. A maximum of four can be fielded in a match at a time.

| Club | Player 1 | Player 2 | Player 3 | Player 4 | Player 5 | Player 6 | Former Players |
|---|---|---|---|---|---|---|---|
| Calicut | (Brazil) John Kennedy | (Brazil) Rafael Resende | (Cameroon) Andres Nia | (Ghana) Ernest Barfo | (Ghana) Richard Osei | (Haiti) Kervens Belfort | (Ghana) James Kotei (Senegal) Papé Diakité |
| Forca Kochi | (Brazil) Raphael Augusto | (Tunisia) Dziri Omran | (Tunisia) Mohamed Nidhal Said | (South Africa) Siyanda Ngubo | (Brazil) Dori | —N/a | —N/a |
| Kannur Warriors | (Spain) Adrián Sardinero | (Spain) Asier Gomes | (Spain) David Grande | (Cameroon) Ernesten Lavsamba | (Spain) Eloy Ordóñez | (Spain) Varo Álvarez | —N/a |
| Malappuram | (Brazil) Sérgio Barboza | (Spain) Joseba Beitia | (Spain) Aitor Aldalur | (Spain) Rubén Garcés | (Spain) Álex Sánchez | (Uruguay) Pedro Manzi | —N/a |
| Thiruvananthapuram Kombans | (Brazil) Patrick Mota | (Brazil) Davi Kuhn | (Brazil) Marcos Wilder | (Brazil) Renan Januario | (Brazil) Michel | (Brazil) Pemaza | —N/a |
| Thrissur Magic | (Brazil) Maílson Alves | (Brazil) Marcelo Toscano | (Cameroon) Atimele A. Beleck | —N/a | —N/a | —N/a | —N/a |

== League table ==
| Pos | Team | Pld | W | D | L | GF | GA | GD | Pts | Qualification |
|---|---|---|---|---|---|---|---|---|---|---|
| 1 | Calicut | 10 | 5 | 4 | 1 | 18 | 9 | +9 | 19 | Advance to Playoffs |
| 2 | Forca Kochi | 10 | 4 | 4 | 2 | 10 | 8 | +2 | 16 | Advance to Playoffs |
| 3 | Kannur Warriors | 10 | 4 | 4 | 2 | 16 | 15 | +1 | 16 | Advance to Playoffs |
| 4 | Thiruvananthapuram Kombans | 10 | 3 | 4 | 3 | 14 | 15 | −1 | 13 | Advance to Playoffs |
| 5 | Malappuram | 10 | 2 | 4 | 4 | 13 | 14 | −1 | 10 | |
| 6 | Thrissur Magic | 10 | 1 | 2 | 7 | 5 | 15 | −10 | 5 | |

Source: Super League Kerala

== Results ==
| Home \ Away | CAL | FKO | KAN | MAL | TKO | THR |
|---|---|---|---|---|---|---|
| Calicut | — | 1–1 | 1–1 | 2–1 | 1–1 | 2–2 |
| Forca Kochi | 0–1 | — | 1–1 | 0–2 | 2–1 | 1–0 |
| Kannur Warriors | 1–3 | 1–1 | — | 4–3 | 1–2 | 2–1 |
| Malappuram | 0–3 | 0–0 | 1–2 | — | 2–2 | 0–0 |
| Thiruvananthapuram Kombans | 1–4 | 1–3 | 1–1 | 1–1 | — | 2–0 |
| Thrissur Magic | 1–0 | 0–1 | 1–2 | 0–3 | 0–2 | — |

Source: Super League Kerala
Legend: Blue = home team win; Yellow = draw; Red = away team win.

== Playoffs ==
The top four clubs will qualify for the semi-finals.

Semi-finals
5 November – Kozhikode
Calicut | 2
Thiruvananthapuram Kombans | 1
6 November – Kozhikode
Forca Kochi | 2
Kannur Warriors | 0

Final
10 November – Kozhikode
Calicut | 2
Forca Kochi | 1

== Season statistics ==
=== Scoring ===
- First goal of the season:
  (Uruguay) Pedro Manzi for Malappuram against Forca Kochi (7 September 2024)

=== Top goalscorers ===
As of 1 November 2024

| Rank | Player | Club | Goals |
|---|---|---|---|
| 1 | (Brazil) Dori | Forca Kochi | 5 |
| 2 | (Spain) Adrián Sardinero | Kannur Warriors | 4 |
| 2 | (Brazil) Pemaza | Thiruvananthapuram Kombans | 4 |
| 2 | (Haiti) Kervens Belfort | Calicut | 4 |
| 2 | (Uruguay) Pedro Manzi | Malappuram | 4 |
| 2 | (India) Gani Nigam | Calicut | 4 |
| 7 | (Spain) Álex Sánchez | Malappuram | 3 |
| 7 | (India) Faslu Rahman | Malappuram | 3 |
| 7 | (Spain) David Grande | Kannur Warriors | 3 |
| 7 | (India) Muhammed Riyas | Calicut | 3 |

=== Viewership and broadcast reach ===
According to figures released by the league organizers, the inaugural 2024 season accumulated a combined 15.52 million viewers across television and digital streaming platforms over 33 fixtures, averaging approximately 0.47 million viewers per match.

2024 Super League Kerala broadcast and digital reach
| Medium | Platform(s) | Total reach | Average per match (33 matches) |
|---|---|---|---|
| Television | Star Sports | 12.76 million | 0.39 million |
| Digital / OTT | Disney+ Hotstar, ManoramaMAX, FIFA+ | 2.76 million | 0.08 million |
| Total (Broadcast & OTT) | — | 15.52 million | 0.47 million |
| Social media (excl. X) | Instagram, Facebook, and related handles | 66.00 million | — |
