= Andrey Chernyshov =

Russian footballer and manager

- Chernyshov in 2018

Personal information
- Full name: Andrey Alekseyevich Chernyshov
- Date of birth: 7 January 1968 (age 58)
- Place of birth: Moscow, Soviet Union
- Height: 1.90 m (6 ft 3 in)
- Position: Centre-back

Senior career*
Years	Team	Apps	(Gls)
1989–1991	Dynamo Moscow	73	(2)
1992–1993	Spartak Moscow	26	(3)
1993–1994	Dynamo Moscow	38	(2)
1995–1996	Sturm Graz	47	(2)
1996	PAOK	7	(0)
1997	SpVgg Greuther Fürth	7	(0)
1998	Royal Antwerp	9	(0)
1998	Torpedo Moscow	2	(0)
1999–2000	DSV Leoben	33	(1)
2000	BSV Bad Bleiberg	5	(0)
2001	Rubin Kazan	1	(0)
Total		248	(10)

International career
1990	Soviet Union U21	5	(1)
1990–1991	Soviet Union	18	(0)
1992	CIS	8	(0)
1992–1993	Russia	3	(0)

Managerial career
- 2002–2005: Russia U21
- 2002–2003: Russia (assistant)
- 2003: Spartak Moscow
- 2006: Dinamo Tbilisi
- 2006–2007: Vitebsk
- 2008: Dynamo Bryansk
- 2010–2011: Akzhayik
- 2013–2014: Al-Fahaheel
- 2015–2017: Spartak Subotica
- 2018–2019: Sparta
- 2020–2021: Dinamo Novi Sad
- 2021: Belasica
- 2021–2022: Mohammedan
- 2023: Radnički Beograd
- 2023–2025: Mohammedan
- 2025–2026: Thrissur Magic
- 2026: Kannur Warriors
Medal record
Men's football
Representing Soviet Union
Gold medal – first place	UEFA Under-21 Championship	1990
- * Club domestic league appearances and goals

Andrey Alekseyevich Chernyshov (Russian: Андрей Алексеевич Чернышов; born 7 January 1968) is a Russian professional football coach and former player. He was recently head coach of Super League Kerala club Kannur Warriors.

== Club career ==
A centre-back, Chernyshov played for numerous clubs in his homeland, including three Moscow-based clubs Dynamo, Spartak and Torpedo, as well as Rubin Kazan. He also represented various clubs abroad, such as Sturm Graz, DSV Leoben and BSV Bad Bleiberg in Austria, PAOK in Greece, SpVgg Greuther Fürth in Germany, as well as Royal Antwerp in Belgium.

== International career ==
At international level, Chernyshov was a member of the Soviet Union national youth team that won the 1990 UEFA European Under-21 Championship. He also represented the Commonwealth of Independent States at UEFA Euro 1992.

== Managerial career ==
Shortly after retiring from the game, Chernyshov became manager of Russia at under-21 level in August 2002. He also worked at numerous clubs, including stints at Spartak Moscow, Dinamo Tbilisi, Vitebsk, Dynamo Bryansk and Akzhayik. In July 2014, Chernyshov was appointed director of football at Torpedo Moscow.

In October 2015, Chernyshov became manager of Serbian club Spartak Subotica. He left the side at the end of the 2016–17 season.

On 12 May 2021, Chernyshov was appointed the new manager of Kolkata based I-League club Mohammedan Sporting for their 2021–22 season. Under his guidance, Mohammedan began the 2021 Durand Cup campaign, and reached to the final, defeating FC Bengaluru United 4–2. On 3 October 2021, they lost the title winning match 1–0 to ISL side FC Goa and finished as runners-up.

On 18 November, Chernyshov guided Mohammedan clinching their 12th Calcutta Football League title after forty long years, defeating Railway FC 1–0. Under his coaching and Nikola Stojanović's captaincy, Mohammedan for the first time, ran for their maiden national league title in 2021–22 I-League season, but finished as runners-up after a 2–1 defeat to Gokulam Kerala at the end. In December 2022, he was replaced by Spanish manager Kibu Vicuña in midway of the 2022–23 I-League season. He re-signed with Mohammedan on 29 August 2023. He led Mohammedan scripting history, won their maiden I-League title in 2023–24 season, which helped them securing promotion to the Indian Super League.

In August 2023, Chernyshov was appointed head coach of Super League Kerala club Thrissur Magic.

The reigning champions of Super League Kerala, Kannur Warriors, have appointed Russian tactician Andrey Chernyshov as their new head coach for the 2026 Super League Kerala (SLK) season.

== Managerial statistics ==
As of match played 12 March 2024

Managerial record by team and tenure
Team	Nat.	From	To	Record				
Team	Nat.	From	To	G	W	D	L	Win %
Russia U-21	(Russia)	6 August 2002	31 December 2005	36	15	5	16	41.67
Spartak Moscow	(Russia)	19 June 2003	11 September 2003	10	5	0	5	50.00
Dinamo Tbilisi	(Georgia (country))	23 January 2006	25 May 2006	15	10	2	3	66.67
Vitebsk	(Belarus)	5 June 2006	28 April 2007	24	7	9	8	29.17
Dynamo Bryansk	(Russia)	1 February 2008	3 June 2008	13	4	0	9	30.77
Akzhayik	(Kazakhstan)	29 January 2010	30 June 2011	32	7	5	20	21.88
Al-Fahaheel	(Kuwait)	29 July 2013	30 June 2014	26	3	4	19	11.54
Spartak Subotica	(Serbia)	31 October 2015	31 May 2017	64	26	16	22	40.63
Sparta	(Greece)	4 October 2018	25 January 2019	13	2	5	6	15.38
Belasica	(North Macedonia)	6 March 2021	31 May 2021	11	1	1	9	9.09
Mohammedan	(India)	9 June 2021	16 December 2022	38	22	6	10	57.89
Radnički Beograd	(Serbia)	22 January 2023	30 June 2023	18	7	4	7	38.89
Mohammedan	(India)	1 September 2023	29 January 2025	22	15	5	2	68.18
Thrissur Magic	(India)	1 September 2025	15 December 2025	11	6	2	3	54.55
Kannur Warriors	(India)	25 July 2026	10 November 2026	7	2	0	5	28.57
Total				322	124	62	136	38.51

== Honours ==
=== Player ===
Spartak Moscow

- Russian Top League: 1992
- Soviet Cup: 1991–92

Sturm Graz

- Austrian Cup: 1995–96

Soviet Union

- UEFA Under-21 Championship: 1990

=== Manager ===
Mohammedan Sporting

- CFL Premier Division A: 2021, 2022
- Durand Cup runner-up: 2021
- I-League 2023–24; runner-up: 2021–22
