= Rahul Raju =

Indian footballer (born 2003)

Personal information
- Date of birth: 20 November 2003 (age 22)
- Place of birth: Kulathoor, Kerala, India
- Height: 1.74 m (5 ft 9 in)
- Positions: Striker; winger; midfielder

Team information
- Current team: Gokulam Kerala
- Number: 20

Youth career
- 2019–2020: United Kochin FC
- 2020–2021: SB FA Poovar

Senior career*
Years	Team	Apps	(Gls)
2021–2022	Bengaluru B	7	(7)
2022–2023	Bengaluru	0	(0)
2022–2023	→ Gokulam Kerala (loan)	19	(1)
2023–2026	Gokulam Kerala	15	(1)
2023–2024	→ Churchill Brothers (loan)	2	(0)
2026	→ Forca Kochi FC	6	(6)

International career
2025–	India U23	0	
- * Club domestic league appearances and goals as of 23:33, 20 March 2026 (UTC)

Rahul Raju (born 20 November 2003) is an Indian professional footballer who plays as a forward for I-League club Gokulam Kerala and Super League Kerala team Forca Kochi FC.

== Club career ==
=== Youth ===
Born in the football frenzy state of Kerala, Rahul Raju started his career at an early age with the local clubs United Kochin FC and, later, SB FA Poovar of Thiruvananthapuram. He then caught the attention of Bengaluru FC scouts and was roped in by the club for their reserves side in 2021.

=== Bengaluru ===
Rahul Raju began his senior career at the fourth-tier football of India with Bengaluru FC B at the 2021–22 season of BDFA Super Division. He scored five goals for the club and had one assist to his name.

The reserves side of Bengaluru FC participated in the maiden season of Reliance Foundation Development League in 2022 and it was a tournament to remember for the then-eighteen-year-old as he went on to secure the golden boot in the tournament with seven goals in seven games for the club who became the league premiers.

=== Gokulam Kerala ===
After tasting success with Bengaluru FC B, Rahul Raju was loaned out for a season, back to his home state of Kerala but this time to the northern part of the state where the I-League club Gokulam Kerala FC is based. Rahul Raju started for the club fifteen times and found back of the net once in the 2022–23 I-League season.

=== Forca Kochi FC ===
In his debut for Forca Kochi FC, Rahul Raju scored a long-range goal to defeat Malappuram FC in the added time. It was also Forca Kochi's first home win against Malappuram FC.

== International career ==
In May 2025, India under-23 head coach Naushad Moosa listed Rahul Raju in the 29-members probable squad for two friendlies that will be held in Tajikistan in June 2025.

== Career statistics ==
=== Club ===
As of 12 February 2025

Club	Season	League			League Cup		Domestic Cup		Continental		Total	
Club	Season	Division	Apps	Goals	Apps	Goals	Apps	Goals	Apps	Goals	Apps	Goals
Bengaluru B	2022	RF Development League	7	7	0	0	—		—		7	7
Gokulam Kerala (loan)	2022–23	I-League	19	1	3 (Note: Appearance(s) in Super Cup)	0	—		—		22	1
Gokulam Kerala	2023–24	I-League	0	0	0	0	4 (Note: Appearance(s) in Durand Cup)	0	—		4	0
Gokulam Kerala	2024–25	I-League	12	1	0	0	0	0	—		12	1
Gokulam Kerala	Gokulam Kerala total		31	2	3	0	4	0	0	0	38	2
Career total			38	9	3	0	4	0	0	0	45	9

== Honours ==
Bengaluru FC B

- Reliance Foundation Development League: 2022

Individual

- 2022 Reliance Foundation Development League: Golden Boot
