= Sergio Gil (footballer, born 1996) =

Spanish footballer

Personal information
- Full name: Sergio Gil Latorre
- Date of birth: 10 May 1996 (age 30)
- Place of birth: Zaragoza, Spain
- Height: 1.83 m (6 ft 0 in)
- Position: Midfielder

Team information
- Current team: Thrissur Magic FC
- Number: 21

Youth career
- Zaragoza

Senior career*
| Years | Team | Apps | (Gls) |
| 2014–2016 | Zaragoza B | 31 | (2) |
| 2015–2016 | Zaragoza | 17 | (0) |
| 2016–2019 | Lugo | 62 | (0) |
| 2019–2022 | Extremadura | 36 | (1) |
| 2022 | Costa Brava | 18 | (1) |
| 2022–2023 | Calahorra | 31 | (0) |
| 2023–2024 | Alcoyano | 3 | (0) |
| 2024–2026 | SD Logroñés | 60 | (8) |
- * Club domestic league appearances and goals as of 7 May 2026

Sergio Gil Latorre (born 10 May 1996) is a Spanish professional footballer who plays as a central midfielder.

== Football career ==
Born in Zaragoza, Aragon, Gil graduated from local Real Zaragoza's youth setup. He renewed his link with the club on 7 August 2013, and made his senior debuts with the reserves in the 2014–15 campaign, in the Segunda División B.

On 14 March 2015, Gil played his first match as a professional, coming on as a late substitute for Iñigo Ruiz de Galarreta in a 0–0 home draw against CD Lugo in the Segunda División. Ahead of the 2016–17 campaign, he was definitely promoted to the first team, but failed to appear during the club's pre-season, considering that his contract extension signed in the previous campaign was not valid.

On 31 August 2016, Gil signed a three-year contract with fellow league team CD Lugo. On 13 July 2019, he moved to Extremadura UD also in the second division, as a free agent.
