= Adrián Sardinero =

Spanish footballer (born 1990)

Personal information
- Full name: Adrián Sardinero Corpa
- Date of birth: 13 October 1990 (age 36)
- Place of birth: Leganés, Spain
- Height: 1.75 m (5 ft 9 in)
- Position: Winger

Youth career
- Getafe

Senior career*
Years	Team	Apps	(Gls)
2008–2011	Getafe B	42	(1)
2010–2012	Getafe	11	(1)
2011–2012	→ Hércules (loan)	31	(4)
2012–2014	Hércules	71	(6)
2014–2016	AEL Limassol	58	(11)
2016–2020	Apollon Limassol	94	(12)
2020–2021	OFI	29	(6)
2021–2023	Perth Glory	16	(0)
2023–2024	Algeciras	30	(1)
2024	Kannur Warriors		
2025	Illescas	10	(1)
2025–2026	Kannur Warriors		
- * Club domestic league appearances and goals as of 21:37, 22 May 2025 (UTC)

Adrián Sardinero Corpa (born 13 October 1990) is a Spanish professional footballer who plays as a winger.

== Club career ==
Sardinero was born in Leganés, Madrid. After emerging through local Getafe CF's youth ranks, he made his senior debut in 2008, helping the B team to promote to Segunda División B for the first time ever in his second year.

On 30 September 2010, one month before his 20th birthday, Sardinero made his debut for the main squad, playing 20 minutes in a 2–0 away loss against BSC Young Boys in the group stage of the UEFA Europa League. One month later, in a home fixture against the same Swiss opponent – in the same competition – he scored the game's only goal, all this before having appeared in La Liga for the club.

Sardinero scored his only Spanish top-flight goal on 2 April 2011, closing the 2–4 home defeat to Valencia CF after coming on as a substitute for Borja Fernández midway through the second half. For the 2011–12 season, both he and teammate Alberto Escassi were loaned to Segunda División side Hércules CF.

On 10 July 2012, Sardinero (and Escassi) signed permanently with Hércules, penning a three-year contract. From 2014 and over six seasons, after their relegation from the second tier, he competed in the Cypriot First Division.

Sardinero joined OFI Crete F.C. of the Super League Greece on 22 June 2020, on a two-year contract. The 30-year-old switched clubs and countries one year later, agreeing to a two-year deal at Perth Glory FC in the A-League.

== Career statistics ==
As of match played on 28 May 2021

Club	Season	League			Cup		Other		Total	
Club	Season	Division	Apps	Goals	Apps	Goals	Apps	Goals	Apps	Goals
Getafe	2009–10	La Liga	0	0	1	0	—		1	0
Getafe	2010–11	La Liga	11	1	2	1	3 (Note: Appearances in UEFA Europa League)	1	16	3
Getafe	Total		11	1	3	1	3	1	17	3
Hércules (loan)	2011–12	Segunda División	31	4	1	0	—		32	4
Hércules	2012–13	Segunda División	39	2	1	0	—		40	2
Hércules	2013–14	Segunda División	32	4	1	0	—		33	4
Hércules	Total		102	10	3	0	—		105	10
AEL Limassol	2014–15	Cypriot First Division	26	2	7	2	4 (Note: Appearances in UEFA Champions League and UEFA Europa League)	1	37	5
AEL Limassol	2015–16	Cypriot First Division	32	9	5	1	—		37	10
AEL Limassol	Total		58	11	12	3	4	1	74	15
Apollon Limassol	2016–17	Cypriot First Division	31	4	6	3	—		37	7
Apollon Limassol	2017–18	Cypriot First Division	21	4	6	1	10	2	37	7
Apollon Limassol	2018–19	Cypriot First Division	27	3	4	0	12	0	43	3
Apollon Limassol	2019–20	Cypriot First Division	15	1	3	0	6	1	24	2
Apollon Limassol	Total		94	12	19	4	28	3	141	19
OFI	2020–21	Super League Greece	29	6	2	1	1	0	32	7
Career total			294	40	39	9	36	5	363	54
