= Vital Borkelmans =

Belgian football coach and former player

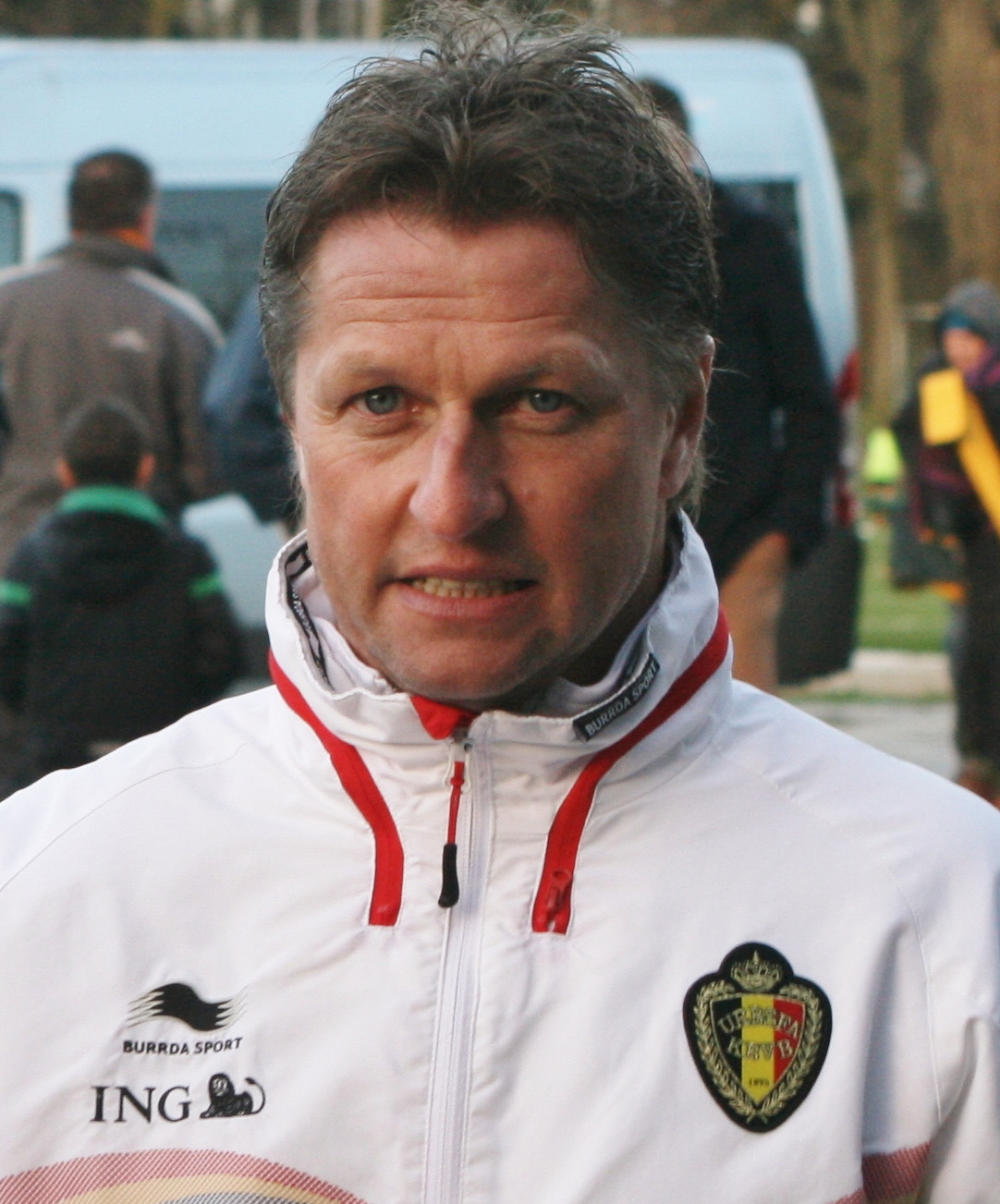
- Borkelmans with Belgium in 2006

Personal information
- Full name: Vital Philomene Borkelmans
- Date of birth: 10 June 1963 (age 63)
- Place of birth: Maaseik, Belgium
- Height: 1.76 m (5 ft 9 1/2 in)
- Position: Defender

Senior career*
Years	Team	Apps	(Gls)
1981–1986	Patro Eisden	101	(10)
1986–1989	Waregem	99	(8)
1989–2000	Club Brugge	348	(23)
2000–2002	AA Gent	56	(2)
2002–2004	Cercle Brugge	61	(5)
2004–2005	KFC Evergem-Center	6	(0)
Total		671	(48)

International career
1989–1998	Belgium	22	(0)

Managerial career
- 2010–2012: Dender EH
- 2012–2016: Belgium (assistant)
- 2018–2021: Jordan
- 2022: Turks and Caicos Islands
- 2025–2026: Al-Zawraa (technical director)
- 2026–: Forca Kochi FC
- * Club domestic league appearances and goals

Vital Philomene Borkelmans (born 10 June 1963) is a Belgian football coach and a former left fullback who mainly played for Club Brugge (350 matches with that club), in the Belgian First Division. He is currently the head coach of Super League Kerala (SLK) club Forca Kochi.

== Club career ==
He also played for Patro Eisden, SV Waregem, Gent and Cercle Brugge.

== International career ==
Borkelmans made his debut for Belgium in an August 1989 friendly match against Denmark, coming on as an 80th-minute substitute for Danny Boffin, and earned a total of 22 caps, scoring no goals. He was in the team for the 1994 and 1998 World Cups. His final international was at the latter tournament, in June 1998 against South Korea.

== Managerial career ==
In January 2010, he was appointed manager of Dender EH in the Belgian Second Division, but fired following the relegation to the Belgian Third Division following the 2011–12 season. In July 2012, Vital Borkelmans was revealed as assistant manager to Marc Wilmots for the Belgium national football team.

In 2018, he was appointed as the head coach of Jordan, until his resignation in June 2021.

== Managerial statistics ==
As of match played 15 June 2021

Managerial record by team and tenure
Team	From	To	Record					Ref.
Team	From	To	P	W	D	L	Win %	Ref.
F.C.V. Dender E.H.	28 January 2010	30 June 2012	85	26	25	34	30.6	
Jordan	8 May 2018	16 June 2021	39	14	12	13	35.9	
Total			124	40	37	47	32.3	—

== Player palmares ==
Club Brugge

- Belgian First Division (4): 1989–90, 1991–92, 1995–96, 1997–98
- Belgian Cup (3): 1990–91, 1994–95, 1995–96
- Belgian Super Cup (6): 1990, 1991, 1992, 1994, 1996, 1998
