= Nahuel Pereyra =

Argentine footballer

Personal information
- Full name: Jonathan Nahuel Pereyra
- Date of birth: 18 December 1991 (age 34)
- Place of birth: Buenos Aires, Argentina
- Height: 1.79 m (5 ft 10 in)
- Position: Defender

Team information
- Current team: Forca Kochi
- Number: 4

Senior career*
Years	Team	Apps	(Gls)
2009–2018	Alvarado	118	(1)
2018–2019	Mons Calpe	20	(1)
2019–2020	Estudiantes de Buenos Aires	12	(1)
2020	Comunicaciones	3	(0)
2021–2023	Deportivo Riestra	48	(0)
2024	Brown de Adrogué	26	(0)
2025	Alvarado		
2025	Calicut	10	(1)
2026–	Forca Kochi		
- * Club domestic league appearances and goals

Jonathan Nahuel Pereyra (born 18 December 1991) is an Argentine professional footballer who plays for Super League Kerala club Forca Kochi.

== Career ==
Pereyra started his senior career with Brown de Adrogué. After that, he played for Mons Calpe. In 2019 he signed for Estudiantes de Buenos Aires in the Argentinean Primera B Nacional, where he has made twelve appearances and scored one goal.
