= Calicut FC =

Football franchise in Kerala

Calicut
- Full name: Calicut Football Club
- Nickname: The Beacons
- Short name: CFC
- Founded: May 2024; 2 years ago
- Ground: EMS Stadium
- Capacity: 50,000
- Owner(s): Futurepoint Sports and Entertainment PVT.LTD
- Chairman: VK Mathews
- Head coach: Ever Demaldé
- League: Super League Kerala; Kerala Premier League; I-League 3
- Website: calicutfootballclub.com
Home colours	Away colours

Calicut Football Club is an Indian professional football club based in the city of Kozhikode, Kerala, that competes in the Super League Kerala and the club finished as runners up in the 2025–26 Kerala Premier League, earning promotion to the I-League 3 for the 2026–27 season. The club was founded in May 2024.

Under coach Ian Gillan, Calicut hosted and drew the first match of the SLK. The club won the inaugural 2024 Super League Kerala title, beating Forca Kochi FC 2–1 in the final.

== Stadium ==
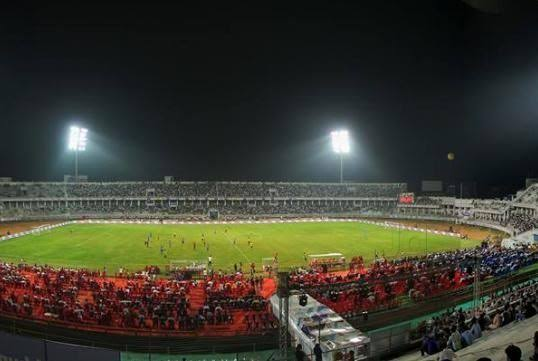

EMS Stadium, located in the heart of Calicut, is used as home ground of Calicut FC

== Performance ==
=== Season 1 (2024) ===
In the inaugural 2024 season of the Super League Kerala, Calicut FC emerged as one of the most dominant and tactically disciplined teams in the competition. Ahead of the season, the club strengthened their core by signing Kervens Belfort, the Haitian international forward with Indian Super League experience, Abdul Hakku Nediyodath, a seasoned centre-back who brought defensive stability, and Gani Nigam, a creative midfielder who dictated play from the middle of the park.

Calicut finished the league stage with five wins, four draws, and one loss, securing a table-top finish and a place in the semifinals. They went on to defeat Thiruvananthapuram Kombans 2–1 in a closely contested semifinal before overcoming Forca Kochi FC 2–1 in the final to lift the Super League Kerala 2024 title. Kervens Belfort finished as the top scorer of the tournament with four goals, including a decisive strike in the final, cementing his reputation as the attacking spearhead of Calicut’s title-winning campaign.

== Supporters ==
Kerala is known for its passionate football fan base. "Beacons" is the supporters' group of Calicut FC. In a first for Indian sports, Calicut Football Club (CFC) launched "Lady Beacons", an exclusive women's supporters' group (WSG) that supports the club in an organized manner from the stands. The initiative, unveiled in Kozhikode, aims to promote inclusivity and encourage greater participation of women in football fandom while reflecting the region’s strong football culture.

== Players ==
=== First-team squad ===
As of 24 September 2026

Note: Flags indicate national team as defined under FIFA eligibility rules; some limited exceptions apply. Players may hold more than one non-FIFA nationality.

No.	Pos.	Nation	Player
1	GK	IND	Debnath Mondal
2	DF	IND	Tluangpuia
6	DF	ARG	Alexis Sosa
7	MF	ARG	Máximo García
9	FW	BRA	Léo David
10	MF	ARG	Federico Boasso
11	FW	IND	Gani Nigam
12	MF	IND	Naseeb Rahman
13	FW	IND	Ajith KR
14	MF	IND	Arun Kumar
15	MF	IND	Emil Benny
17	MF	IND	Andrews A
18	MF	IND	Riyas PT
19	FW	IND	Muhammed Ashique
21	GK	IND	Loitongbam Bishorjit Singh
22	MF	ARG	Agustín Villalobos

No.	Pos.	Nation	Player
23	GK	IND	Fayad Firoz
24	DF	IND	Muhammed Ameen
25	DF	IND	Cirin Varghese
28	FW	IND	Prasanth Mohan
29	FW	IND	Calwin Thomas
31	DF	IND	Manoj Markose
32	GK	IND	Mirshad Michu
37	FW	ARG	Maximiliano Urruti
45	MF	IND	Anin Muhammed
47	FW	IND	Muhammed Roshal
60	MF	IND	Girik Khosla
77	FW	IND	Muhammed Shadhil
79	MF	IND	Jobin J
80	MF	IND	Ajad Shaheem
99	DF	IND	Ankit Mukherjee
—	DF	IND	Mohammed Jasim

=== Other players under contract ===
Note: Flags indicate national team as defined under FIFA eligibility rules; some limited exceptions apply. Players may hold more than one non-FIFA nationality.

No.	Pos.	Nation	Player
—	DF	IND	Henry Joseph
—	DF	IND	Sachin Dev
—	MF	IND	Lalremruata
—	FW	IND	Junain Kadavalath
—	MF	IND	Muhammed Rashid
—	MF	IND	Arjun Jayaraj
—	DF	IND	Arap Konyak
—	FW	IND	Rifhath Ramzan
—	FW	IND	Shamnad KP
—	FW	IND	Muhammed Sanaf
—	DF	IND	Muhammed Aslam
—	FW	IND	Adam David

No.	Pos.	Nation	Player
—	MF	IND	Yhoto Lohe
—	FW	IND	Rahul Venu
—	FW	IND	Antony K Paulose
—	GK	IND	Muhammed Anas
—	GK	IND	Aalok Tishrei Mathew
—	DF	IND	Ningthoujam Lanchenba
—	MF	IND	Abu Swalih

== Personnel ==
As of 15 September 2026

=== Current technical staff ===
Position	Name
Head coach	(Argentina) Ever Demaldé
Assistant coach	(India) Biby Thomas
Goalkeeping coach	(India) Nelson MV
Strength & conditioning coach	(Argentina) Matias Cano
Physio	(India) Sayyid Ahammed Nasal Gifri PK
Performance Analyst	(India) Abhinadan Mohanta
Masseur	(India) Bijesh P

=== Management ===
Position	Name
Chief executive officer	(India) Korath Mathew
Operations Director	(India) Jibu Gibson
Team manager	(India) Said Ibnu Haris
Kit manager	(India) Mohammad Fayiz

== Managerial history ==
=== Head coach's record ===
As of 26 September 2026

Name	Nationality	From	To	P	W	D	L	GF	GA	Win%	Ref.
Ian Gillan	Australia	30 July 2024	8 March 2025	12	7	4	1	22	11	58.33	
Ever Demaldé	Argentina	20 August 2025		12	8	2	2	23	12	66.67	

== Statistics and records ==
As of 10 November 2024

=== Most appearances ===
Rank	Player	appearances
1	(Ghana) Richard Osei	21
1	(India) Muhammed Riyas	21
3	(India) Mohammed Arshaf	18
4	(Argentina) Federico Boasso	12
5	(India) Thoi Singh Khangebam	11
5	(India) Muhammad Ajsal	11
5	(Argentina) Alexis Sosa	11
8	(India) Gani Nigam	10
8	(Ghana) Ernest Barfo	10
8	(India) Vishal Joon	10
8	(Argentina) Nahuel Pereyra	10
8	(India) Hajmal Sakeer	10
8	(India) Mohammed Asif Khan	10
8	(India) Prasanth Mohan	10

=== Top scorers ===
Rank	Player	Goals
1	(India) Muhammad Ajsal	7
2	(Haiti) Kervens Belfort	5
3	(India) Gani Nigam	4
3	(India) Prasanth Mohan	4
5	(India) Muhammed Riyas	3
5	(Colombia) Sebastián Rincón	3
7	(India) Britto P. M.	2
7	(Brazil) John Kennedy	2
7	(Ghana) Richard Osei	2
7	(Argentina) Federico Boasso	2

== Honours ==
- Super League Kerala
  - Champions : 2024
- Kerala Premier League
  - Runners-up: 2025–26

== See also ==
- List of football clubs in Kerala
- Football in Kerala
- Sports in Kerala
