= Ever Demaldé =

Argentinian football manager

Personal information
- Full name: Ever Adriano Demaldé
- Date of birth: 8 May 1987 (age 39)
- Place of birth: Junín, Argentina

Team information
- Current team: Calicut (head coach)

Managerial career
- Years: Team
- 2014–2015: Marseille (assistant coach)
- 2015–2017: Saudi Arabia (assistant coach)
- 2018: Godoy Cruz (assistant coach)
- 2019–2020: Argentinos Juniors (assistant coach)
- 2020–2021: Al-Hilal United
- 2022: Gimnasia y Tiro
- 2023: Independiente Rivadavia
- 2023: Dila Gori
- 2024: Herrera FC
- 2025–: Calicut

Ever Adriano Demaldé (born 8 May 1987) is an Argentinian professional football manager who is currently coaching the Super League Kerala club Calicut.
