= Ian Gillan (football coach) =

Scottish-born Australian soccer coach

Personal information
- Full name: Ian Andrew Gillan
- Date of birth: 16 January 1965 (age 61)
- Place of birth: Aberdeen, Scotland
- Height: 1.88 m (6 ft 2 in)
- Position: Midfielder

Team information
- Current team: Thiruvananthapuram Kombans FC (head coach)

Senior career*
Years	Team	Apps	(Gls)
1992	Dulwich Hill		

Managerial career
- 2000: St George
- 2001: Ryde Sports
- 2002: Fraser Park U21
- 2003–2004: Fraser Park
- 2006: Ryde Sports
- 2010–2013: Perth Glory
- 2014: Kedah (Assistant)
- 2017: Ilocos United
- 2017–2019: Sarawak
- 2020: Kedah (Youth director)
- 2021–2023: PSIS Semarang
- 2023: Lalitpur City
- 2024–2025: Calicut
- 2025: Odi SC
- 2025–2026: Ellon United FC
- * Club domestic league appearances and goals

Ian Andrew Gillan (born 16 January 1965) is a Scottish-born Australian football coach who holds a UEFA Pro license.

== Career ==
Taking charge of Ilocos United of the Philippines Football League in 2017, Gillan brought in many young players for the upcoming season. By November that year he had departed the club, with the media dispersing rumors that he would be head coach of local side Sarawak for the 2018 season. Eventually, he signed a two-year contract on December 2, doing his first training session two days later.

== Statistics ==
As of 10 November 2024

Managerial record by team and tenure
Team	From	To	Record				
Team	From	To	G	W	D	L	Win %
Ilocos United	1 April 2017	25 November 2017	3	0	0	3	0.00
PSIS Semarang	17 September 2021	9 January 2023	13	5	2	6	38.46
Lalitpur City	1 November 2023	31 August 2023	11	5	4	2	45.45
Calicut	18 July 2024	8 March 2025	12	7	4	1	58.33
Total			39	17	10	12	43.59

== Honours ==
Calicut FC

- Super League Kerala: 2024
