= Thiruvananthapuram Kombans FC =

Football club in Kerala

Thiruvananthapuram Kombans
- Full name: Thiruvananthapuram Kombans Football Club
- Nickname: The Kombans
- Short name: TKFC
- Founded: May 2024; 2 years ago
- Ground: Chandrasekharan Nair Stadium
- Capacity: 20,000
- Owner(s): Mohammed Illias Sahadulla; K. C. Chandrahasan; T. J. Mathews
- Head coach: Ian Gillan
- League: Super League Kerala
- Website: kombansfc.com
Home colours	Away colours

Thiruvananthapuram Kombans Football Club is an indian, professional football club based in the city of Thiruvananthapuram, Kerala, competing in the Super League Kerala. The club was founded in May 2024.

== History ==
Thiruvananthapuram Kombans FC (TKFC) represent the football culture of Kerala, specifically from the capital city, Thiruvananthapuram. The fan club of Thiruvananthapuram Kombans FC is called Kombans Fanatics.

Thiruvananthapuram Kombans FC made their debut in the 2024 Super League Kerala on September 10, in a match against Calicut FC. Held at the EMS Stadium, the game ended in a 1–1 draw. Thiruvananthapuram Kombans FC earned their first win on September 16, defeating Thrissur Magic FC 2–0 at their home ground.

== Ownership and finances ==
Thiruvananthapuram Kombans FC's patrons are Princess Gowri Parvathi Bayi, a member of the former royal family of Travancore, Dr. Shashi Tharoor MP, Jacob Punnoose IPS, Dr. Mohammed Illias Sahadulla, chairman and managing director of KIMS Hospital, Mr. Terance Alex, Founder and CEO of Wattsun Energy, K. C. Chandrahasan, managing director of Kerala Travels, T. J. Mathews, co-owner of Kovalam FC, G. Vijaya Raghavan, founder of Technopark, R. Anil Kumar and N. S. Abhayakumar.

== Ground ==
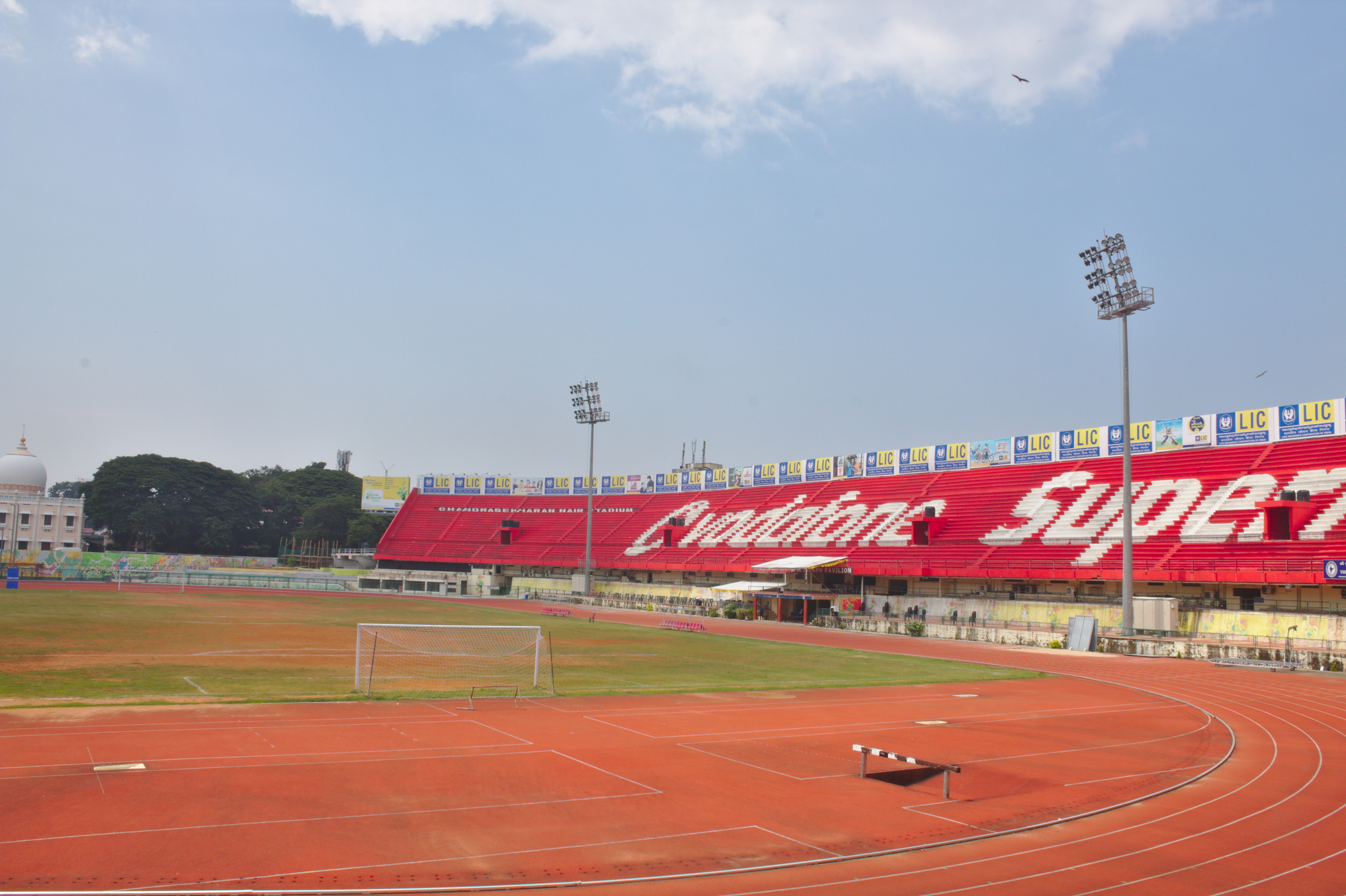
Chandrasekharan Nair Stadium

Chandrasekharan Nair Stadium, located in Thiruvananthapuram, is the home ground of Thiruvananthapuram Kombans FC. This historic stadium hosts various domestic and regional football matches. Ahead of the inaugural Super League Kerala season, Thiruvananthapuram Komans FC announced the Chandrasekharan Nair Stadium (CSN) in Thiruvananthapuram as their official home ground. The club signed a three-year agreement to use the venue for twelve days each year, while the stadium underwent a ₹1.5-crore renovation ahead of the season. The upgrades included resoling of the football turf funded by the franchise and installation of new floodlights financed by the league organisers. Club co-owner T. J. Mathew stated that the team intends to construct a dedicated stadium within the three-year period.

== Performance ==
=== Season 1 (2024) ===
Thiruvananthapuram Komans FC participated in the inaugural season of the Super League Kerala under head coach Sérgio Alexandre. The club built its overseas core entirely from Brazil, registering six foreign players: Patrick Mota, Davi Kuhn, Marcos Wilder, Renan Januário, Michel Américo, and Autemar Bispo.

Across the league phase, the Kombans produced a balanced campaign and concluded the stage fourth in the table with a record of 3 wins, 4 draws and 3 losses (3–4–3), advancing to the knockout round. The club’s run ended in the semi-finals, where they were eliminated by Calicut FC.

== Players ==
=== First-team squad ===
Note: Flags indicate national team as defined under FIFA eligibility rules; some limited exceptions apply. Players may hold more than one non-FIFA nationality.

No.	Pos.	Nation	Player
1	GK	IND	Satyajit Bordoloi
8	MF	ANG	Norberto Emous
10	MF	BRA	Patrick Mota
11	FW	IND	Jamsheed Ali
12	DF	IND	Abhiram K
14	DF	IND	Shinu R
15	FW	IND	Kapil Hoble
19	MF	IND	Muhammed Nisham
20	MF	GHA	Joseph Gordon
22	FW	IND	Shijin Thadhayous
26	MF	IND	Arjun V
31	DF	GHA	Stephen Acquah
33	FW	BRA	Paulo Cezar

No.	Pos.	Nation	Player
55	MF	IND	Shane Sajan Jacob
57	MF	IND	Adil P
74	DF	IND	Jestin George
—	MF	IND	Malsawtluanga
—	DF	IND	Shanu Stellas
—	MF	IND	Muhammed Sanooth
—	DF	IND	Ariston Costa
—	FW	IND	Hrithik Antony
—	FW	IND	Gokul Santhosh
—	GK	IND	Femin Antony
—	GK	IND	Sapam Singh
—	MF	IND	Akshay PM
—	DF	IND	Shravan Shetty

== Technical staff ==
Role	Name	Country	Ref.
Head coach	Ian Gillan	Australia	
Team manager	V S Abhilash	India	
Assistant manager	Niranjan S	India	
Assistant coach	Sanush Raj	India	
Goalkeeping coach	Shasin Chandran	India	
S&C coach	Nikhil Das	Australia	
