= Prasanth Karuthadathkuni =

Indian footballer (born 1997)

Prasanth Mohan
Personal information
- Full name: Prasanth Karuthadathkuni Mohan
- Date of birth: 24 June 1997 (age 29)
- Place of birth: Kozhikode, Kerala, India
- Height: 1.77 m (5 ft 10 in)
- Positions: Winger; right-back

Team information
- Current team: Calicut
- Number: 28

Youth career
- AIFF Elite Academy
- DSK Shivajians

Senior career*
Years	Team	Apps	(Gls)
2016–2022	Kerala Blasters	61	(1)
2017	→ Chennai City (loan)	10	(1)
2022–2023	Chennaiyin	15	(1)
2023–2024	Punjab	11	(0)
2024–2025	Inter Kashi	6	(2)
2025–2026	Calicut	9	(3)
2026	Inter Kashi	11	(1)
2026–	Calicut	2	(1)

International career
2015	India U17	1	(0)
2017	India U20	1	(0)
- * Club domestic league appearances and goals as of 19:00, 26 September 2026 (UTC)

Prasanth Karuthadathkuni Mohan (born 24 June 1997) is an Indian professional footballer who plays as a winger for Super League Kerala club Calicut.

== Club career ==
=== Youth and early career ===
Born in Kerala, Prasanth originally began his athletic career as a runner, winning a bronze medal at a state meet in Kozhikode. He then started to play football in 2008 after being convinced to do so by his brother, Pramod. He went on to represent the Kerala under-14 side in 2010 before appearing for selection trials for the AIFF Regional Academy in May 2012. He was able to trial for a spot in the academy after his performances for his state during the South Zone under-16 championship a few months prior. Prasanth was trialing with 54 other prospects for a spot in the academy. His trial was successful and in the end he was the only player from Kerala to be selected for a spot in the AIFF Regional Academy. He also had a stint with the DSK Shivajians academy.

=== Kerala Blasters ===
==== 2016 ISL season ====
Prasanth stayed with the regional academy and eventually moved up to be part of the AIFF Elite Academy for four years. In 2016, he was signed by the Kerala Blasters of the Indian Super League. He made one appearance on the bench for the side during the 2016 ISL season, on 4 November against Delhi Dynamos, but didn't see any game time.

==== 2017: Loan to Chennai City ====
In January 2017, Prasanth was loaned to Chennai City. On 14 January 2017, Prasanth made his professional debut in the I-League for Chennai City against Bengaluru FC. He started and almost played the full match despite Chennai City losing 2–0. He scored his first professional goal of his career for the club on 12 March 2017 against East Bengal. His 92nd-minute goal was the winner as Chennai City defeated East Bengal 2–1.

==== 2017–2022 ====
On 4 July 2017 it was announced that Prasanth would be retained by Kerala Blasters for the 2017–18 season. He soon made his professional debut for the club, coming on as an 80th-minute substitute in their opening match of the season against ATK. Kerala Blasters would draw the match 0–0. On 6 April 2018, Prashant debuted for Kerala Blasters FC in round 16 of Hero Super Cup 2018 and scored his first ever goal for the Blasters. He scored a 48th-minute goal, one of two goals the club scored in a 2–3 loss to NEROCA FC.

On 20 October 2019, Prasanth started and played the full 90 minutes in the opening game of the Indian Super League 2019-20 season against rivals ATK as the Blasters won 2–1 at home. His cross for Bartholomew Ogbeche in the 45th minute led to the winning goal. He made 12 appearances during the season for the club and provided one assist during the season.

On 12 September 2020 it was announced that Prasanth has extended his contract with the Blasters till 2021. Later on 9 January 2021, the Blasters announced that they have extended the contract of Prasanth for two more years, which tied him with the club until 2023. Prasanth was included in the squad for the 2021 Durand Cup, where he played all three matches for the club in the tournament. He made his first league appearance of the season in the 2021–22 season opener against ATK Mohun Bagan on 19 November as an injury substitution for Rahul K P, which they lost 4–2 at full-time. Prasanth scored his first league goal for the club against Odisha FC on 5 December, where he came in as a substitute for Sahal Abdul Samad and scored the second goal for the Blasters, thus helping the Blasters to win 2–1 at full-time in his 50th league game for the club.

On 19 September 2022, Kerala Blasters announced that they have reached an agreement to mutually part ways with Prasanth. With a six-year stint, he was the longest serving player for the Blasters during the time of his departure.

=== Chennaiyin FC ===
On 27 September 2022, Chennaiyin FC announced the signing of Prasanth on a one-year deal.

== International career ==
=== Youth career ===
Prasanth has represented India at the junior level by playing for the India national under-17 football team and India national under-20 football team.

== Career statistics ==
As of matches played till 30 March 2022

Club	Season	League			Cup		Continental		Durand Cup		Total	
Club	Season	Division	Apps	Goals	Apps	Goals	Apps	Goals	Apps	Goals	Apps	Goals
Kerala Blasters	2016	ISL	0	0	—	—	—	—	—	—	0	0
Chennai City (loan)	2016–17	I-League	10	1	0	0	—	—	—	—	10	1
Kerala Blasters	2017–18	ISL	10	0	1	1	—	—	—	—	11	1
Kerala Blasters	2018–19	ISL	11	0	1	0	—	—	—	—	12	0
Kerala Blasters	2019–20	ISL	12	0	0	0	—	—	—	—	12	0
Kerala Blasters	2020–21	ISL	13	0	0	0	—	—	—	—	13	0
Kerala Blasters	2021–22	ISL	15	1	0	0	—	—	3	0	18	1
Kerala Blasters	Kerala Blasters FC total		61	1	2	1	0	0	3	0	66	2
Career total			71	2	2	1	0	0	3	0	76	3

== Honours ==
Kerala Blasters

- Indian Super League runner up: 2021–22.
