= Malappuram FC =

Football club in Kerala

Malappuram
- Full name: Malappuram Football Club
- Nickname: The Orange rooh
- Short name: MFC
- Founded: May 2024; 2 years ago
- Ground: Malappuram District Sports Complex Stadium, Payyanad, Manjeri
- Capacity: 30,000
- Owner(s): Veliyath Ajmal; Anvar Ameen Chelat; Sanju Samson
- Head coach: Karim Bencherifa
- League: Super League Kerala
- Website: fcmalappuram.com
| Home colours | Away colours |

Malappuram Football Club is an Indian professional football club based in Malappuram, Kerala, competing in the Super League Kerala. The club was founded in May 2024.

== Stadium ==
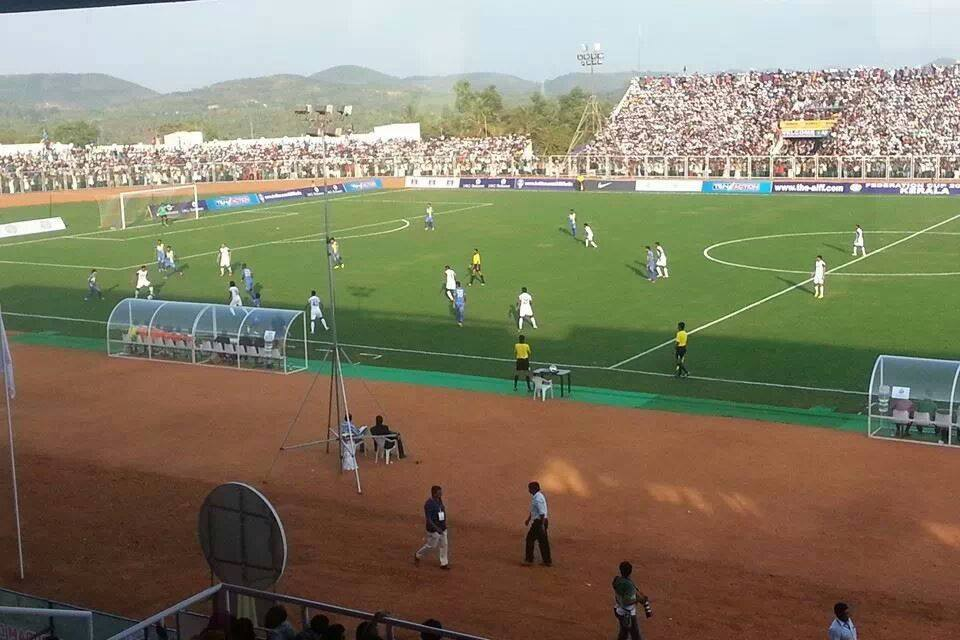
MDSC Stadium (Malappuram)

Malappuram FC plays their home matches at the Malappuram District Sports Complex Stadium in the city of Manjeri.

== Club performance ==
=== Season 1 (2024) ===
Malappuram entered the competition with expectations and the backing of football fan base. Under the management of former Aston Villa and Chennaiyin FC coach John Gregory, the club assembled a star-studded squad that combined experienced Indian names with proven foreigners. The most notable domestic signing was Anas Edathodika, the former India international. The foreign contingent featured Sérgio Barboza, who had previous I-League experience, along with Joseba Beitia and Pedro Manzi, both with successful stints in Indian football.

Malappuram began their campaign with a win over Forca Kochi FC. However, the team’s form dipped, as defensive lapses and finishing woes led to dropped points. Their two victories of the season came in away fixtures, against Forca Kochi and Thrissur Magic FC. By the end of the league stage, Malappuram finished fifth among six teams, with a record of two wins, four draws, and four losses, thereby failing to qualify for the semifinals.

=== Season 2 (2025) ===
After a dismal outing in the inaugural season of the Super League Kerala, Malappuram FC management undertook a sweeping rebuild. The club appointed Miguel Corral as the new head coach, signalling a shift toward a more modern, possession-oriented approach. Roy Krishna joined the attack, adding proven goal-scoring pedigree. They secured Gani Nigam, one of the standout midfielders of the previous edition. The defence was strengthened by the arrival of Abdul Hakku.

== Supporters ==
Ultras Malappuram are the official supporters' group of Malappuram FC in the Super League Kerala. The group is associated with fan activities such as tifo displays, chants, and coordinated drumming during matches. The supporters are part of the football culture of Malappuram district.

== Players ==
=== First-team squad ===
Note: Flags indicate national team as defined under FIFA eligibility rules; some limited exceptions apply. Players may hold more than one non-FIFA nationality.

| No. | Pos. | Nation | Player |
|---|---|---|---|
| 1 | GK | IND | Muhammed Jaseen |
| 2 | DF | IND | Harikrishnan M |
| 3 | DF | IND | Mashoor Shereef |
| 4 | DF | IND | Muhammed Bilal |
| 5 | MF | IND | Prabanj Prasad |
| 7 | MF | MAR | Abdelhay Elforsy |
| 8 | MF | IND | Rishad PP |
| 10 | MF | GAB | Grâce-Adieu Youmou |
| 11 | FW | FRA | Amadou Soukouna |
| 12 | MF | IND | Arjun Ullas |
| 14 | FW | IND | Sajeesh EK |
| 15 | DF | IND | Abdul Hakku ([(captain)]) |
| 16 | MF | IND | Salman Kalliyath |
| 17 | FW | IND | Muhammed Riswan |
| 18 | FW | IND | Muhamed Mahdi |
| 19 | FW | IND | Rishad Gafoor |
| 20 | FW | IND | Rashid CK |

| No. | Pos. | Nation | Player |
|---|---|---|---|
| 99 | ST | BRA | John Xavier Kennedy |
| 23 | DF | IND | Mohamed Salim |
| 24 | GK | IND | Mohamed Arbaz |
| 25 | MF | IND | Riswan Shoukath |
| 26 | MF | IND | Avinash |
| 28 | MF | IND | Abith KB |
| 29 | FW | IND | Daniel Lalhlimpuia |
| 30 | FW | IND | Akbar Siddique |
| 32 | MF | IND | Hashir V |
| 35 | GK | IND | Devansh Dabas |
| 44 | DF | GHA | Abdul Samed Ango |
| 51 | DF | IND | Abdul Badish |
| 55 | DF | IND | Bibin Ajayan |
| — | FW | BRA | Paulo Victor |
| — | FW | IND | Aflahudheen |
| — | MF | MAR | Adnane Bentagana |
| — | DF | IND | Nidhin Krishna |

== Personnel ==
As of August 2025

=== Current technical staff ===
| Role | Name |
|---|---|
| Head coach | (Morocco) Karim Bencherifa |
| Assistant coach | (India) Chinta Chandrashekar Rao |
| Goalkeeping coach | (India) Munavar |
| Strength and conditioning coach | (India) Joshua |
| Physio | (India) Ashique K |
| Team Manager | (India) Seyed Muhammad Rafi |
| Kit Manager | (India) Akshay |

=== Management ===
| Position | Name |
|---|---|
| Chief operating officer | (India) Arun K. Nanu |
| Head of football operations | (India) Wilbur Lasrado |

== Kit manufacturers and shirt sponsors ==
| Period | Kit manufacturer | Shirt sponsor | Back sponsor | Chest sponsor | Sleeve sponsor |
|---|---|---|---|---|---|
| 2024 | Hummel | Impex | – | | |
| 2025 | Hummel | Rapheal Film City | – | | |

== See also ==
- List of football clubs in Kerala
- Football in Kerala
- Sports in Kerala
