= Asier Gomes =

Spanish footballer

Personal information
- Full name: Asier Gomes Álvarez
- Date of birth: 1 January 1998 (age 28)
- Place of birth: Oviedo, Spain
- Height: 1.74 m (5 ft 9 in)
- Position: Midfielder

Team information
- Current team: Kannur Warriors
- Number: 10

Senior career*
Years	Team	Apps	(Gls)
2016–2018	Oviedo B	51	(7)
2017	Oviedo	0	(0)
2018–2019	Racing B	16	(0)
2019–2020	Langreo	10	(0)
2020–2024	Covadonga	94	(13)
2024–	Kannur Warriors	15	(1)

International career
2014	Spain U16	1	(0)
- * Club domestic league appearances and goals as of 25 September 2024

Asier Gomes Álvarez (born 1 January 1998) is a Spanish professional footballer who plays for the Super League Kerala club Kannur Warriors as a midfielder.

== Club career ==
Gomes was born in Oviedo, Asturias, and represented Fútbol Centro Asturiano Oviedo and Real Oviedo as a youth. He made his senior debut with the reserves in the 2016–17 campaign, in Tercera División.

Gomes made his first team debut on 6 September 2017, starting in a 0–1 home loss against CD Numancia, for the season's Copa del Rey. The following 24 August, he moved to another reserve team, Racing de Santander B also in the fourth division.
