= Alexis Sosa =

Argentine footballer

Personal information
- Full name: Alexis Sosa
- Date of birth: 22 July 1999 (age 27)
- Place of birth: Burzaco, Argentina
- Height: 1.77 m (5 ft 9 1/2 in)
- Position: Centre-back

Team information
- Current team: Calicut
- Number: 6

Youth career
- Banfield

Senior career*
Years	Team	Apps	(Gls)
2016–2023	Banfield	14	(0)
2022	→ Ferro (loan)	5	(0)
2024–2025	Arsenal Sarandí	45	(1)
2025–	Calicut	12	(1)
- * Club domestic league appearances and goals as of 26 September 2026

Alexis Sosa (born 22 July 1999) is an Argentine professional footballer who plays as a centre-back for Super League Kerala club Calicut.

== Career ==
Sosa started his professional career with Argentine Primera División side Banfield, making his debut on 10 September 2016 in a league draw against Colón.

== Career statistics ==
As of 5 August 2018.

Club statistics
Club	Season	League			Cup (Note: Includes the Copa Argentina)		League Cup		Continental (Note: Includes the Copa Libertadores and Copa Sudamericana)		Other		Total	
Club	Season	Division	Apps	Goals	Apps	Goals	Apps	Goals	Apps	Goals	Apps	Goals	Apps	Goals
Banfield	2016–17	Primera División	1	0	0	0	—		0	0	0	0	1	0
Banfield	2017–18	Primera División	1	0	0	0	—		0	0	0	0	1	0
Banfield	2018–19	Primera División	0	0	0	0	—		0	0	0	0	0	0
Career total			2	0	0	0	—		0	0	0	0	2	0
