= Chandrasekharan Nair Stadium =

Football stadium in Kerala, India

- CSN Police Stadium
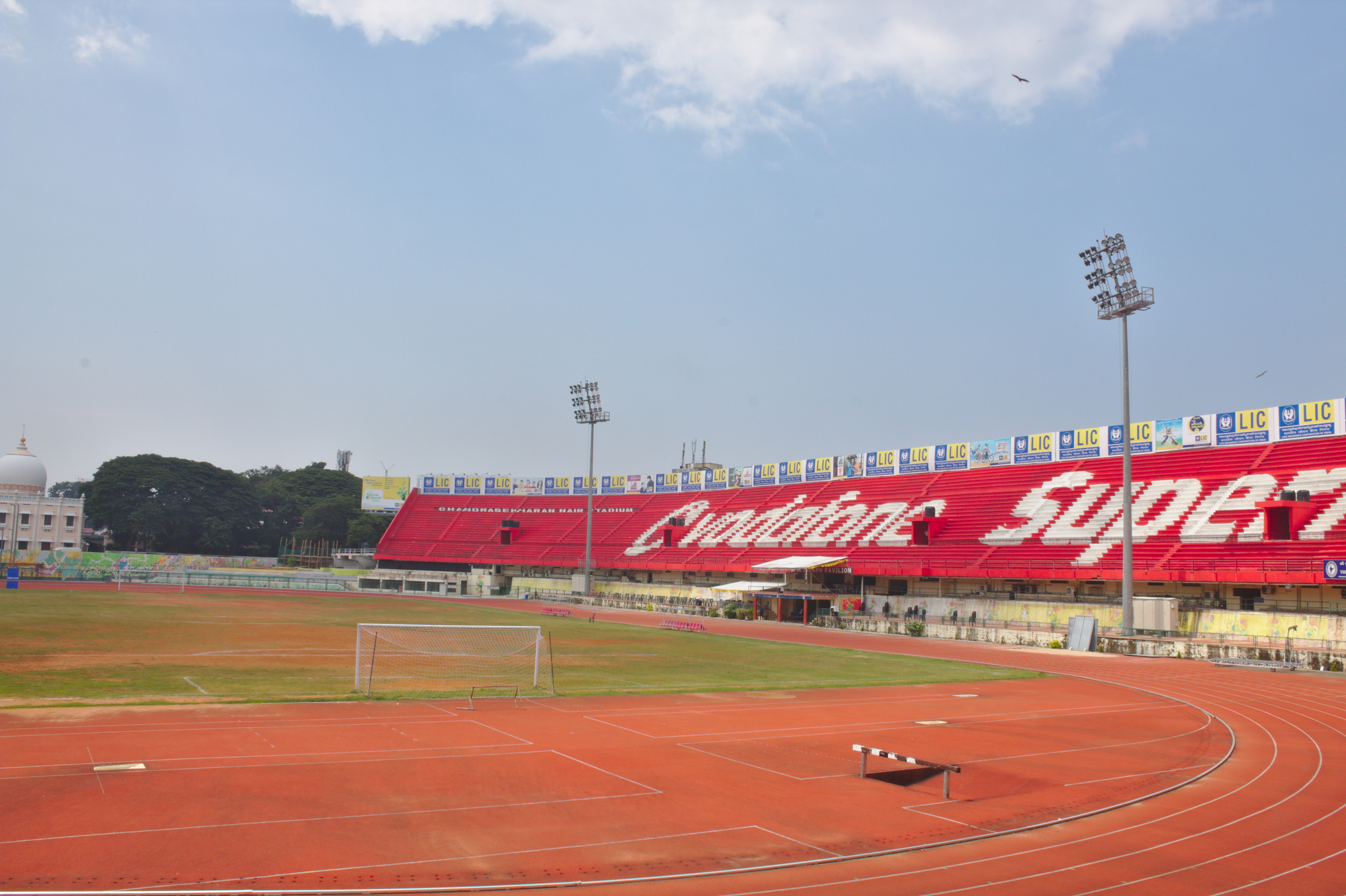
- Interactive map of Chandrasekharan Nair Stadium
- Location: Thiruvananthapuram, Kerala
- Coordinates: 8.5049°N 76.9507°E
- Owner: Kerala Police Sports & Youth Welfare Society
- Operator: Kerala Police Sports & Youth Welfare Society
- Capacity: 30,000
- Surface: Grass

Construction
- Opened: 1956; 70 years ago
- Renovated: 2024; 2 years ago

Tenants
- Kerala Police (football team); Thiruvananthapuram Kombans FC

Chandrasekharan Nair Stadium, also known as CSN Police Stadium, is a multi-purpose stadium situated in Thiruvananthapuram, Kerala, India, mostly used for football matches.

The stadium was named in honor of the first inspector general of the Kerala Police, N. Chandrasekharan Nair, in 1956. The stadium was renovated for the 35th National Games. It is also the home ground for Thiruvananthapuram Kombans FC in the Super League Kerala (SLK).

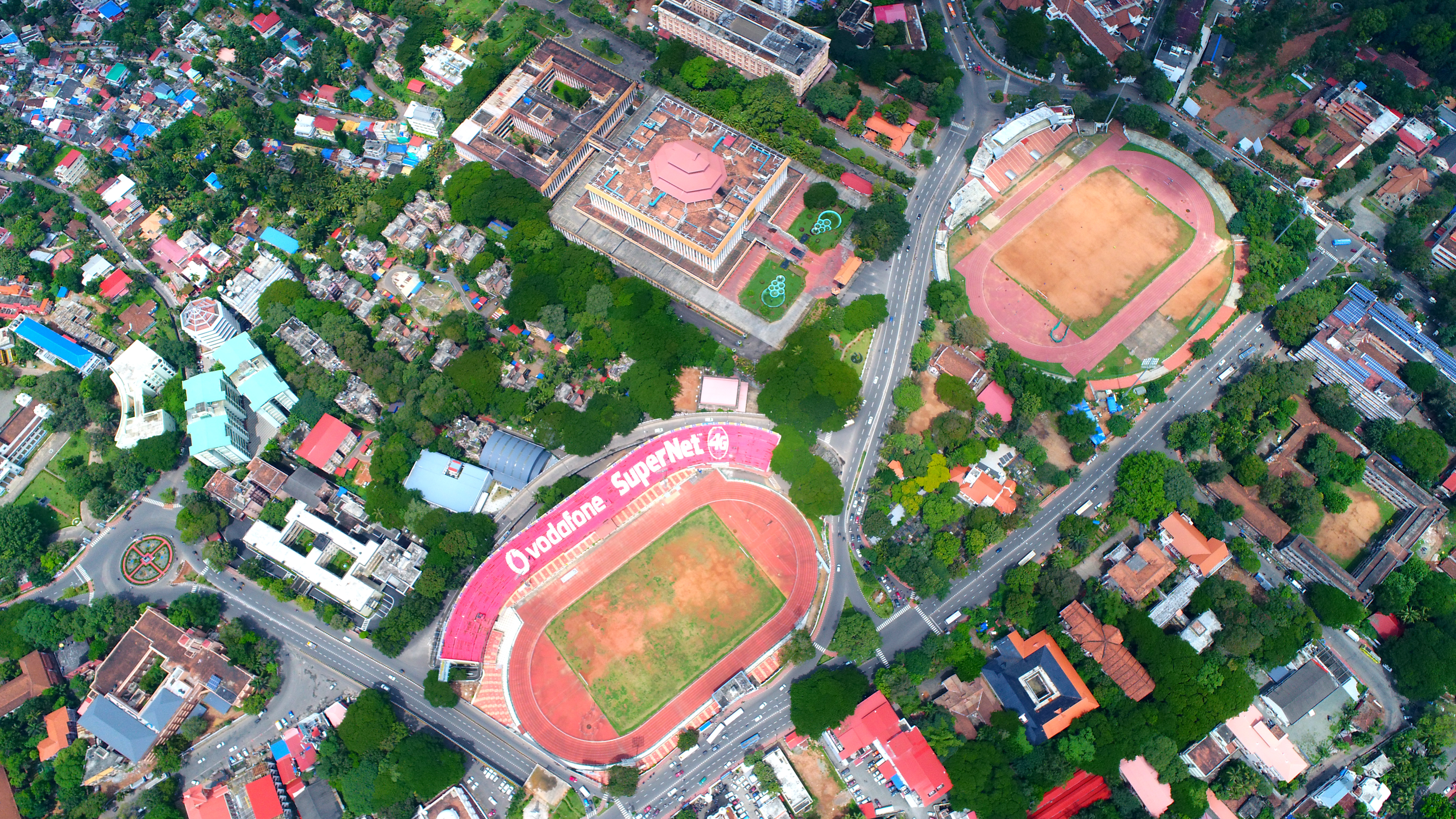
A view of CSN stadium (left) and University Stadium (Right)

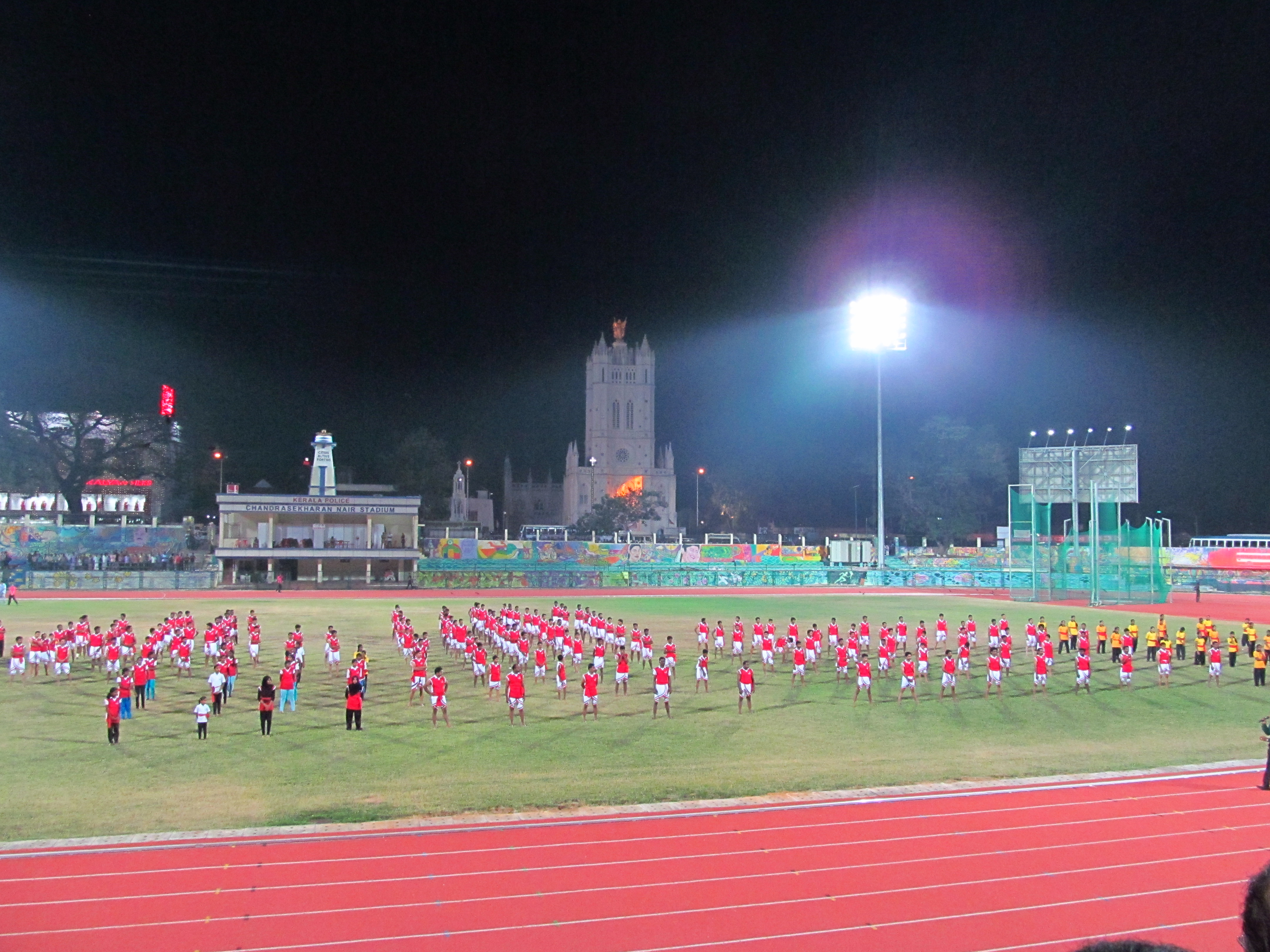
Kalaripayattu demonstration for 35th National Games in Chandrasekharan Nair Stadium Thiruvananthapuram Kerala
