= Thrissur Magic FC =

Indian association football club based in Thrissur

Thrissur Magic
- Full name: Thrissur Magic Football Club
- Nicknames: The Magicians; Thrissur Brigade
- Short name: TMFC
- Founded: May 2024; 2 years ago
- Ground: Thrissur Municipal Corporation Stadium; Malappuram District Sports Complex Stadium (selected matches)
- Capacity: 15,000; 30,000
- Owner(s): Listin Stephen; Nivin Pauly
- Head coach: David Caneda
- League: Super League Kerala

Thrissur Magic Football Club is an Indian professional football club based in Thrissur, Kerala, that competes in the Super League Kerala. The club was established in 2024 during the league's inaugural season. Giovanni Scanu was announced as the first head coach.

== Players ==
As of 24 September 2026

Note: Flags indicate national team as defined under FIFA eligibility rules; some limited exceptions apply. Players may hold more than one non-FIFA nationality.

No.	Pos.	Nation	Player
1	GK	IND	Kamaludheen AK
2	DF	GHA	Samuel Amofa
4	DF	VEN	Henry Plazas
8	MF	COL	Bladmir Angulo
11	MF	IND	Anshid NA
12	DF	IND	Sahad NP
16	MF	IND	Abdul Samad
17	FW	IND	Muhammed Afsal
18	DF	IND	Muhammed Jiyad
19	MF	IND	Silajit Santra
21	MF	ESP	Sergio Gil
24	MF	IND	Lenny Rodrigues

No.	Pos.	Nation	Player
29	FW	IND	Senthamil Sambakam
33	MF	IND	Basith PT
34	DF	IND	Midhlaj CK
46	MF	IND	Shihas PM
77	MF	IND	Naveen Krishna
99	DF	IND	Sandeep S
—	MF	IND	Muhammed Mushraf
—	MF	IND	Muhammed Niyaj
—	GK	IND	Parthiv KM
—	DF	IND	Pabitra Mandi
—	GK	IND	Ranjan Soren

== Club officials ==
- Owner: (India) Listin Stephen
  (India) Nivin Pauly
- Executive chairman: (India) Sushanth Mathew
- Operations manager: (India) Aslam Shafi
- Head coach: (Spain) David Caneda
- Assistant coach: (India) Jo Paul Ancheri
- Assistant coach: (India) Duleep Menon
- Goalkeeper coach: (India) Rex Gabriel
- Physiotherapist: (India) Anandhu SK

== See also ==
- List of football clubs in Kerala
- Football in Thrissur
- Football in Kerala
