= Kannur Warriors FC =

Football club in Kerala

Kannur Warriors
- Full name: Kannur Warriors Football Club
- Nicknames: The Warriors (team); The Red Mariners (supporters)
- Short name: KWFC
- Founded: May 2024; 2 years ago
- Ground: Jawahar Municipal Stadium; EMS Stadium (selected matches)
- Capacity: 30,000; 50,000
- Chairman: Hassan Kunhi
- Head coach: Vacant
- League: Super League Kerala
Home colours	Away colours

Kannur Warriors Football Club is an indian professional football club based in Kannur, Kerala which competes in the Super League Kerala. The club was founded in May 2024.

== Players ==
=== First-team squad ===
As of 6 September 2026

Note: Flags indicate national team as defined under FIFA eligibility rules; some limited exceptions apply. Players may hold more than one non-FIFA nationality.

No.	Pos.	Nation	Player
1	GK	IND	Hajmal Sakeer
5	DF	ESP	Varo Álvarez
6	MF	IND	Craig Mangkhanlian
7	FW	IND	Nijo Gilbert
8	MF	GHA	Frederick Ansah Botchway
9	FW	IND	Goutham P
10	MF	ESP	Asier Gomes
11	FW	IND	Mohammed Shafi
12	MF	CMR	Ernesten Lavsamba
13	GK	IND	Mohammed Fizan Jabir
14	MF	IND	Hrushub K
15	DF	IND	Sacin Sunil
16	MF	IND	Muhammed Musharaf

No.	Pos.	Nation	Player
17	FW	IND	Adwaid P
18	FW	IND	Muhammed Sinan
19	DF	IND	Sairuat Kima
20	MF	IND	Umasankar M
22	FW	IND	Faslu Rahman
27	GK	IND	Prateek Kumar Singh
35	DF	IND	Shibin Saad
39	FW	SRB	Bogdan Stamenković
43	MF	IND	Pragyan Gogoi
46	DF	IND	Vikas Singh Saini
55	MF	IND	Manoj S
77	FW	ESP	Gerard Artigas
99	DF	IND	Jobin Joseph

== Personnel ==
As of 25 July 2026

=== Coaching staff ===
Position	Name
Head coach	Vacant
Assistant coach	(India) Shafeeq Hassan M.
Goalkeeping coach	(India) Eldho Paul
Performance Analyst	(Sri Lanka) Sanka Jayamina
Physio	(India) Midhun PM
Assistant Physio	(India) Sahaluddeen Ahammed

=== Football sport management ===
Position	Name
Director of football	(India) Jewel Jose
Team Manager	(India) Alfin K Joseph
Kit Manager	(India) Iwan Wasily

== Board of directors ==
Position	Name
Chairman	Hassan Kunhi
Directors	Mibu Jose Nettikadan; Ajith Joy; Asif Ali; Muhammed Salih; K.M. Varghese; Muhammed Madani; E.P. Abdurahiman

== Honours ==
- Super League Kerala
  - Champions : 2025

== See also ==
- List of football clubs in Kerala
- Football in Kerala
- Sports in Kerala
