= Malappuram District Sports Complex Stadium =

Football stadium in Kerala, India

Malappuram District Sports Complex Stadium, Payyanad
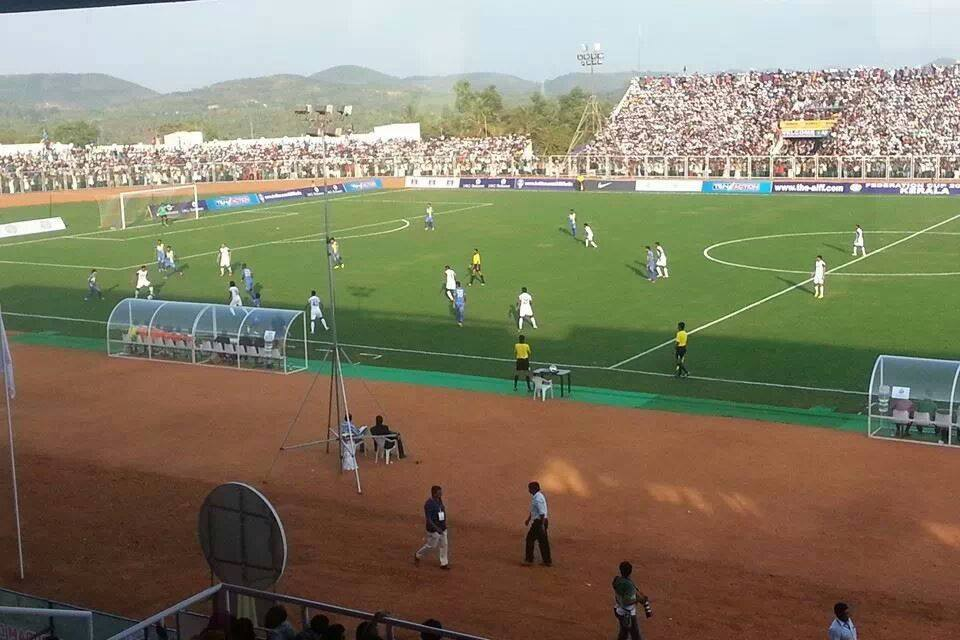
- MDSC/Payyanad Stadium
- Location: Payyanad, Manjeri, Malappuram, Kerala
- Owner: Sports and Youth Affairs Department, Government of Kerala
- Operator: Department of Sports and Youth Affairs, Government of Kerala
- Capacity: 30,000
- Surface: Grass

Construction
- Opened: 2013

Tenants
- Kerala United FC; Gokulam Kerala FC (sometimes); GKFC (women) (sometimes); Kerala Premier League; Malappuram FC; Sports Academy Tirur (sometimes)

Malappuram District Sports Complex Stadium (locally known as Payyanad Stadium) is a multi-purpose stadium in Kerala, India, located about 7 km from Manjeri and 12 km from Malappuram. The stadium has a capacity of 30,000 spectators. Opened in 2013, it is part of the Malappuram District Sports Complex & Football Academy, under the management of Malappuram District Sports Council.

== Overview ==
The stadium was selected as one of two stadiums, along with the Jawaharlal Nehru Stadium, Kochi, to host the group stages of the 2013–14 Indian Federation Cup. The stadium hosted matches of group B and D and hosted 12 matches in the 2013–14 Federation Cup.In 2017–18 season of Kerala Premier League, the stadium was used as home ground by Gokulam Kerala FC.

Gokulam Kerala FC will play their first six I league home matches in Manjeri, will be hoping to receive similar support as they begin their quest for an unprecedented third consecutive Hero I-League title.

The 2021–22 Santosh Trophy was the 75th edition of the Santosh Trophy, the premier competition in India for teams representing their regional and state football associations. The last season was cancelled due to COVID-19 pandemic in India. The main round of the tournament was held in Malappuram, and was contested by 10 teams divided into two groups. Kerala and West Bengal from Group A and Manipur and Karnataka from Group B reached the semi-finals, and eventually Kerala and West Bengal faced in the final. Kerala won their seventh title after defeating West Bengal in the penalties.

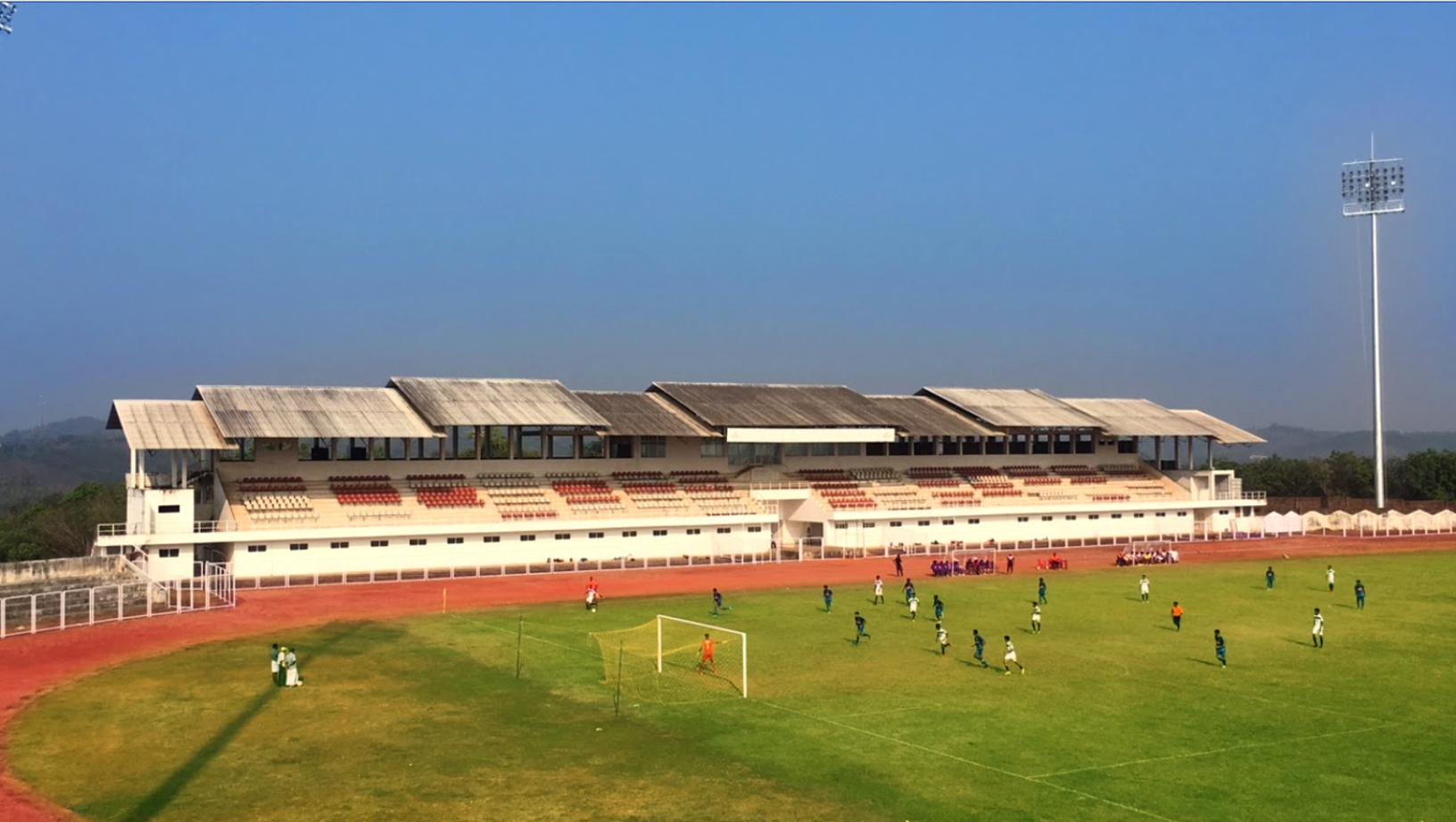
A view of the stadium

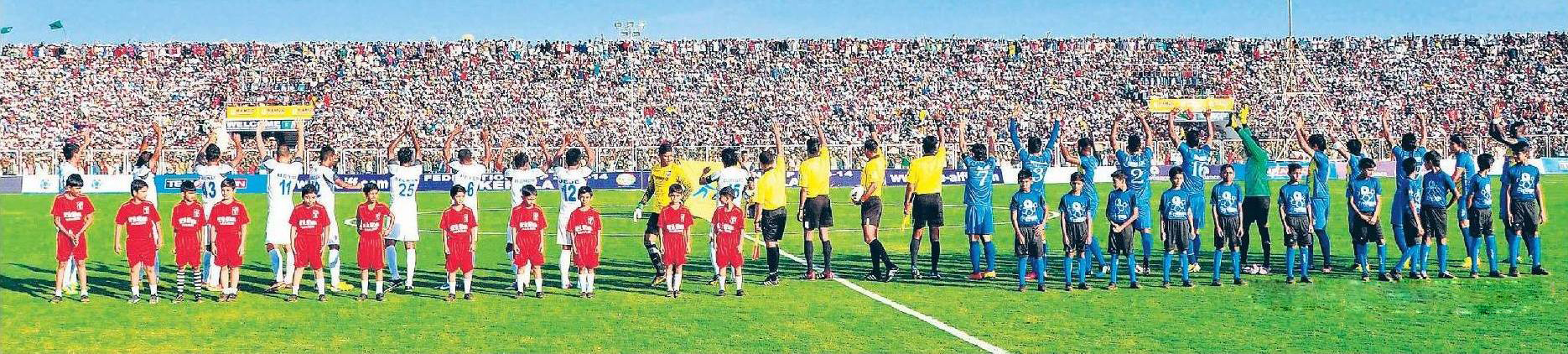
Stadium During Federation Cup 2014

== 2013–14 Federation Cup ==
Indian football's main domestic cup competition, the Federation Cup, was held for the 35th time in 2013–14. There were 16 teams that participated in this edition of the tournament, all of which were placed into four groups of four teams each during the group stage. In the 2012 final, East Bengal defeated Dempo 3–2. At the Jawaharlal Nehru Stadium in Kochi, Kerala, Churchill Brothers defeated Sporting Goa 3–1 in the final on 25 January 2014.

There were two venues chosen to host matches for the Federation Cup in 2013, the Jawaharlal Nehru Stadium and the Malappuram District Complex. Group A and C matches were held at the Jawaharlal Nehru Stadium, while Group B and D matches were played at the Malappuram District Complex. The semi-finals and finals were held at the Jawaharlal Nehru Stadium.

== 2021–22 Santosh Trophy ==
Kerala emerged victorious in the 75th Santosh Trophy 2022, following a 5–4 penalty shootout defeat of West Bengal at the Manjeri Stadium in Malappuram, Kerala. The fiercely competitive match ended with a 1–1 draw after extra time, despite both teams creating numerous clear-cut chances. Jijo Joseph, Kerala's captain, was rewarded with the accolade of player of the match for his commanding midfield displays – this triumph marks Kerala's third Santosh Trophy win on home soil, having previously triumphed in Kochi in 1973–74 and 1992–93.

37 teams participated in the qualifiers, whereas, the final round is being competed by 10 teams. The venue for the main round Santosh Trophy is Malappuram in Kerala. The Kottappadi Stadium and the Payyanad Stadium are the two venues where the matches are being held.

Player of the Tournament: Jijo Joseph.

Top scorer with nine goals: Jesin TK.

=== The following teams have qualified for the main round of the Santosh Trophy ===
1. Kerala
2. West Bengal
3. Meghalaya
4. Punjab
5. Rajasthan
6. Manipur
7. Karnataka
8. Odisha
9. Gujarat
10. Services

Top Scorer of Santosh Trophy 2021–2022
Name	Team	Goals
Jesin TK	Kerala	9
Sudheer Kotikela	Kerala	8
Md. Fardin Ali Molla	West Bengal	6
Amanpreet Singh	Punjab	6

=== Most Santosh Trophy titles won by team ===
Team	Titles
West Bengal	32
Punjab	8
Kerala	7
Services	6
Goa	5

== I-League ==
Payyanad Stadium will host the I-League season, which will kick off at a venue that is synonymous with the love of football. The town where fans throng to the stands whenever any football match takes place will witness the opening match of the I-League 2022–23 season as defending champions Gokulam Kerala FC and last season's runners-up Mohammedan Sporting Club play each other.

The Gokulam Kerala team will play six of their home matches at the Payannad Stadium in Malappuram, while the remaining five will be played at the EMS Stadium in Kozhikode, where they have already played previously. Real Kashmir FC will move to the Bakshi Stadium in Srinagar from February onward, making its I-League debut.

== See also ==
- List of football stadiums in India
- Lists of stadiums
