= Forca Kochi FC =

Football club in Kerala

Forca Kochi
- Full name: Forca Kochi Football Club
- Nickname: Forcà de Kochi
- Short name: FKFC
- Founded: May 2024; 2 years ago
- Ground: Maharaja's College, Ground
- Capacity: 15,000
- Owner(s): Nasly Mohammed; Prithviraj Sukumaran; Supriya Menon; Shameem Backer CK; Mohammed Shyjal K Praveesh Kuzhipally
- Head coach: Vital Borkelmans
- League: Super League Kerala
- Website: forcakochi.com
Home colours	Away colours

Forca Kochi Football Club, also known as Kochi Forca, is an Indian professional football club based in Kochi, Kerala that competes in the Super League Kerala. The club was founded in May 2024.

== History ==
Actor-director Prithviraj Sukumaran and his wife Supriya Menon acquired majority stake of Forca Kochi FC. The club participates in the Super League Kerala (SLK), which commenced on 7 September 2024. The league features six teams from various regions of Kerala, including Kochi, Thiruvananthapuram, Kozhikode, Thrissur, Malappuram and Kannur. Forcacruz is the official supporters club.

== Players ==
=== First-team squad ===
As of 26 September 2026

Note: Flags indicate national team as defined under FIFA eligibility rules; some limited exceptions apply. Players may hold more than one non-FIFA nationality.

No.	Pos.	Nation	Player
1	GK	IND	Yasheel Shah
2	DF	IND	Ajay Alex
3	DF	BRA	Renan Araújo
4	MF	ARG	Nahuel Pereyra
6	MF	IND	Rahul Raju
7	FW	MEX	Diego Hernández
8	MF	IND	Muhammed Ameen
9	FW	BRA	Paulo Henrique
10	MF	BRA	Éliton Júnior
17	MF	IND	Vishak Mohanan
18	MF	IND	Jishnu P
19	FW	IND	Harshal Rahman
21	GK	IND	Jaimy Joy

No.	Pos.	Nation	Player
23	DF	IND	Amar Muhammed
26	DF	IND	Salman Faris
27	DF	IND	Nithin Madhu
28	MF	IND	Sangeeth Satheesh
29	GK	IND	Debjit Majumder
39	DF	IND	Mohamed Salah
41	MF	IND	Diljith
70	MF	IND	Piyush
77	FW	IND	Vishnu CV
88	MF	IND	Faris Ali
93	DF	IND	Akhil Praveen
99	FW	IND	Alan Saji
—	DF	IND	Mohammed Irfan Sait
—	MF	CIV	Aubin Kouakou

== Personnel ==
As of 2 September 2026

=== Current technical staff ===
Position	Name
Head coach	(Belgium) Vital Borkelmans
Assistant coach	(India) Baiju GS
Goalkeeping coach	(India) Haary Benny
Strength & conditioning coach	(India) Samiran Nag
Physio	(India) Jithu Jayan
Performance Analyst	(India) Sravan JS
Team manager	(India) Nikidesh KV

== See also ==
- List of football clubs in Kerala
- Football in Kerala
- Sports in Kerala
