= Football in Kerala =

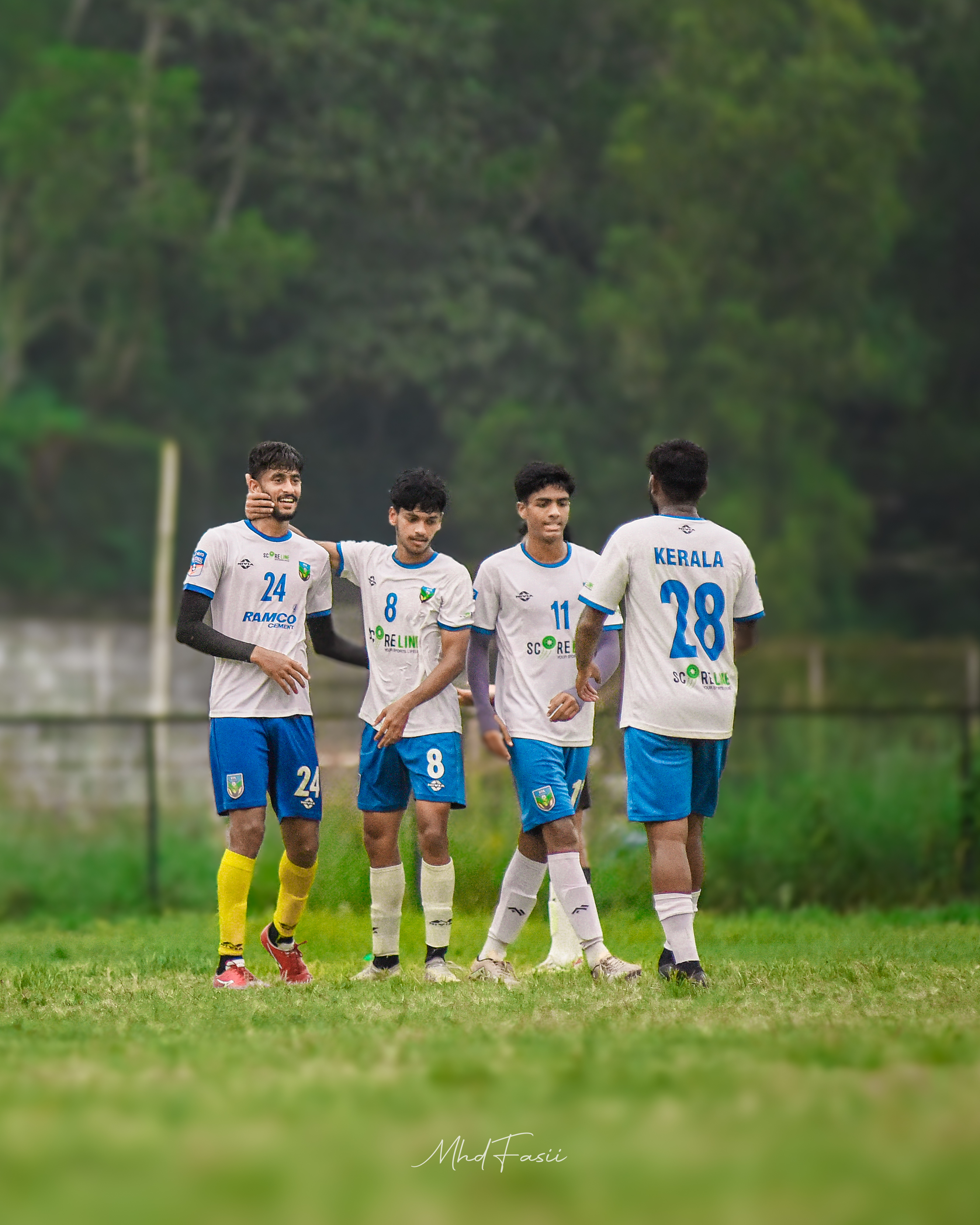
- Members of the Kerala football team
- Governing body: Kerala Football Association (KFA)

Audience records
- Single match: 100,000 (India vs Iraq 1997 Nehru Cup semi-final)

Football is one of the most popular sports in Kerala. Malabar, the northern region of Kerala, is the main powerhouse of Kerala football, It was introduced to the land of Kerala during the pre-independence period by British officers of the Malabar Special Police (MSP) in the 20th century. MSP was camped in Malappuram and soon the natives began adopting the sport, which was mostly played in post-harvest paddy fields. Kerala enjoyed a golden age from 1985 to 1995 by making it to Santhosh Trophy finals seven times consecutively, and football became an iconic sport ever since in the south Indian state. FIFA released the film Maitanam - The Story of Football in Kerala, quoting: Football in the Indian state of Kerala runs through the fabric of its society, where football is life and life is football.

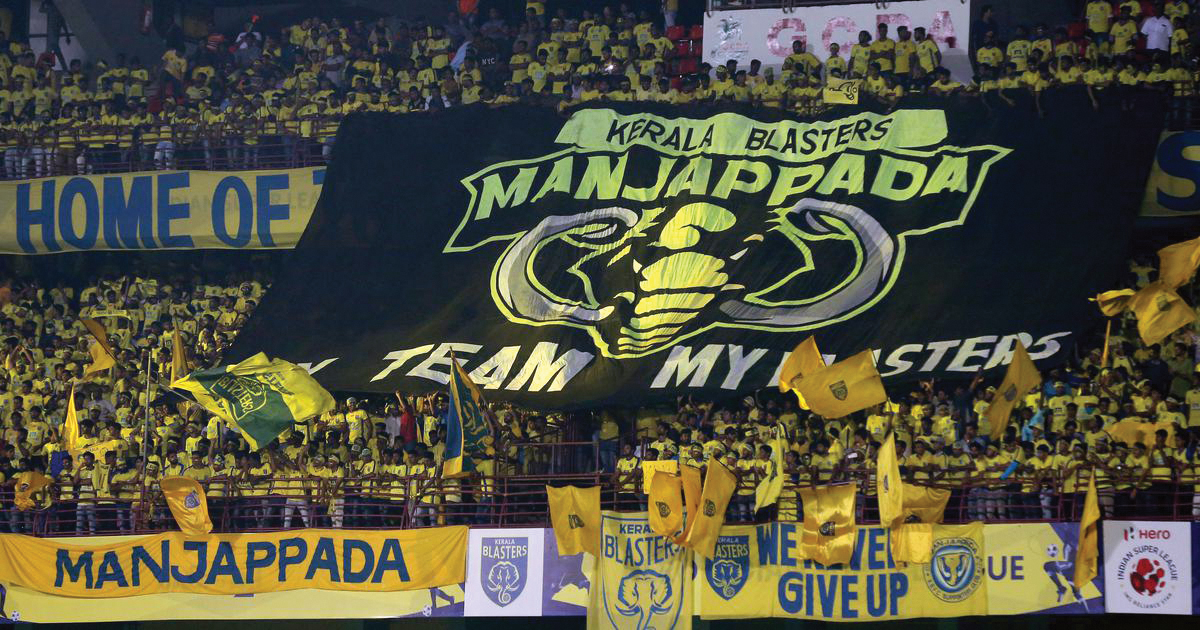
Manjappada displaying a tifo and banners during a match

Kerala state football team appeared in the Santosh Trophy finals 15 times and won the trophy 7 times, latest in 2022 by defeating Bengal in the final on 2 May at the Payyanadu Stadium in Malappuram. Gokulam Kerala FC won the 2020–21 I-League to become the first ever club from Kerala to win an I-League title. They created history by becoming the first team in the I-League era to defend its title, being 2021-22 I-League champions. Gokulam Kerala FC is also the first club from Kerala to qualify for a continental competition, the AFC Cup. Kerala Blasters, the Indian Super League club based in Kochi, are one of the most widely supported clubs in Asia and with one of the largest social media following among the football clubs from the continent. Travancore Royals Football Club (TRFC), founded on 29 November 2018, is India's first fans-owned club.

Kerala Premier League, together with Kerala Super League, is the official state level tournament, succeeding Kerala State Club Football Championship, both organized by the Kerala Football Association. SBI Kerala FC is the most successful Kerala League team becoming champions 6 times while Travancore Titanium FC is most successful in the Championship, winning it 10 times.

== History ==
Football has been a passion of thousands of Malayalees for the last several decades—much before the state of Kerala was formed on 1 November 1956. Kerala Football Association was formed in 1948 to directly oversees the development of football in Kerala from grassroots to senior level.

The Sait Nagjee Cup Football Tournament is a popular international club football tournament held in Kozhikode which has been attracting large crowd since 1952. Brazilian footballer Ronaldinho has served as the brand ambassador for the Sait Nagjee Football Tournament.

Famous international footballers including Ronaldinho, Maradona, Roberto Carlos, Thomas Tuchel visited Kerala for different reasons. David James and Dimitar Berbatov managed Kerala Blasters in different season. The Hero Super Cup of 2023 was held in Kerala.

== Administration ==
Football in Kerala is administered by the Kerala Football Association It sends state teams for Santosh Trophy and Rajmata Jijabai Trophy.

The Department of Sports and Youth Affairs, under the Government of Kerala, along with the Kerala State Sports Council, is responsible for the development of sports, including football, in the state.

== State team ==
State teams of Kerala
- Football (Men's): Football (Women's)

Kerala football team is governed by the Kerala Football Association (KFA) and is a member of the All India Football Federation (AFC) since 1948, the national governing body for indian football. There are other Kerala football team for women's also.

=== Performance ===
The following list includes the performance of all of Kerala's state teams at major competitions.

=== Men's team ===
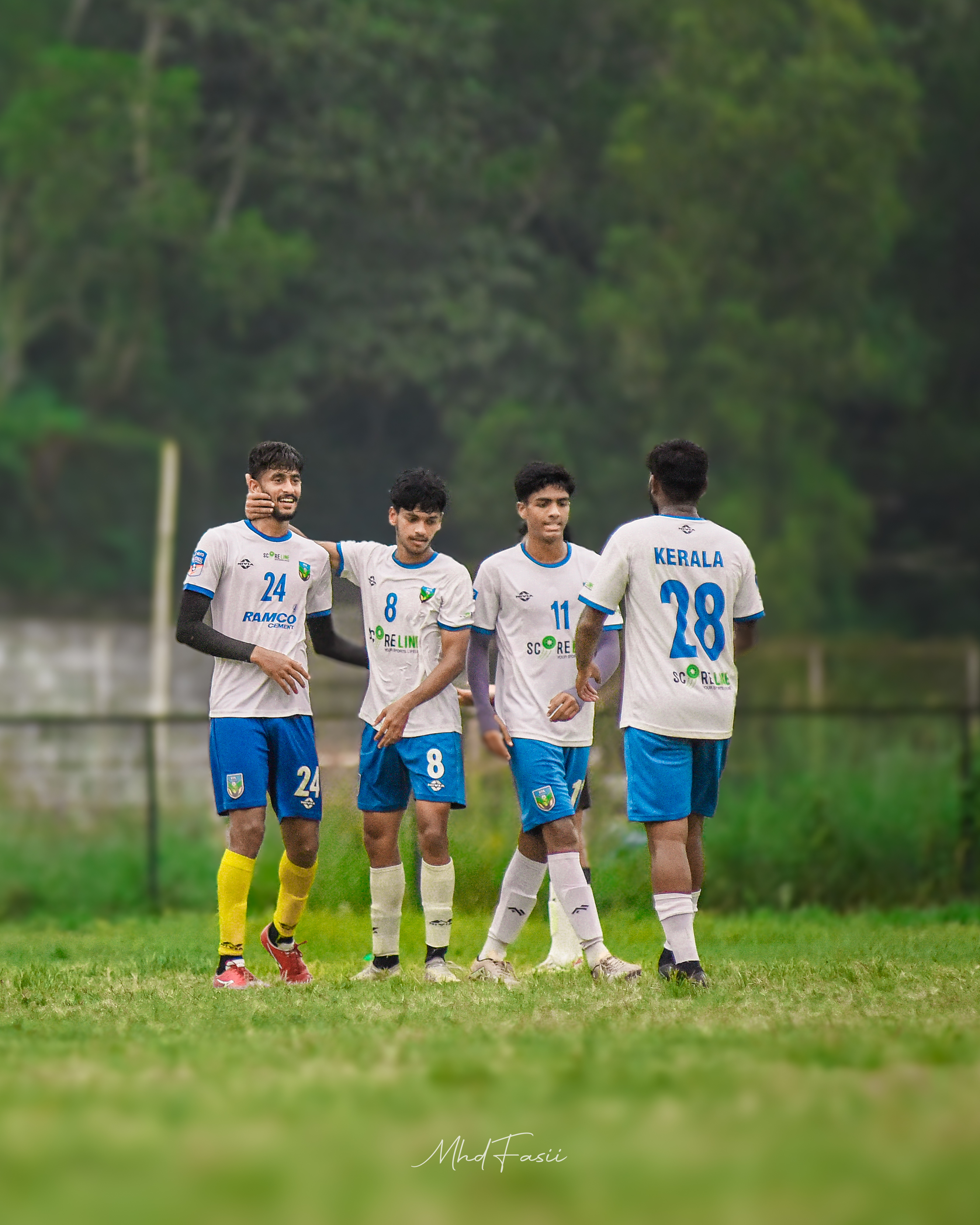
Kerala men's football team

The Kerala football team represents Kerala in Indian state football competitions, including the Santosh Trophy.

Tournament	Best performance
Santosh Trophy	Champions (1973–74, 1991–92, 1992–93, 2001–02, 2004–05, 2017–18, 2021–2022)
National Games	Gold (1987, 1997)
B.C. Roy Trophy	Champions (1968–69, 1971–72, 1972–73)
Mir Iqbal Hussain Trophy	Champions (1981–82, 1983–84)
M. Dutta Ray Trophy	Champions (1995)

=== Women's team ===
Kerala women's football team represents Kerala in the Rajmata Jijabai Trophy. They have appeared in the Santosh Trophy finals once, and were the runners-up at their maiden attempt at the 2005–06 Senior Women's National Football Championship edition against the reigning champions Manipur at Rourkela.

Tournament	Best performance
Rajmata Jijabai Trophy	Runners-up (2005–06)
National Games	Bronze (1999)

== Affiliated district associations ==
All 14 districts of Kerala are affiliated with the Kerala Football Association.

No.	Association	District	President
1	Alappuzha District Football Association	Alappuzha	
2	Ernakulam District Football Association	Ernakulam	
3	Idukki District Football Association	Idukki	
4	Kannur District Football Association	Kannur	
5	Kasaragod District Football Association	Kasaragod	
6	Kollam District Football Association	Kollam	
7	Kottayam District Football Association	Kottayam	
8	Kozhikode District Football Association	Kozhikode	
9	Malappuram District Football Association	Malappuram	
10	Palakkad District Football Association	Palakkad	
11	Pathanamthitta District Football Association	Pathanamthitta	
12	Thiruvananthapuram District Football Association	Thiruvananthapuram	
13	Thrissur District Football Association	Thrissur	
14	Wayanad District Football Association	Wayanad	

== Competitions ==
=== District level ===
==== Men's senior ====
- Inter-District State Championship Senior Men

==== Men's youth ====
- Inter-District State Championship Junior Boys
- Inter-District State Championship Sub-Junior Boys

==== Women's senior ====
- Inter-District State Championship Senior Women

=== Club level ===
==== Men's senior ====
- Kerala Premier League (5th division of Indian football league system)
- Super League Kerala
- N.I. David Memorial Trophy

==== Women's senior ====
- Kerala Women's League (3rd division of Indian football league system)

==== Evolution of the football system ====
Years		1948	1948–1952	1952–1970	1970–1998	1998–2007	2007–2013	2013–2015	2013–2016	2016–2017	2017–2021	2021–2023	2024–
Level		1948	1948–1952	1952–1970	1970–1998	1998–2007	2007–2013	2013–2015	2013–2016	2016–2017	2017–2021	2021–2023	2024–
Men's
State leagues	1	Formation of Kerala Football Association (KFA)	None			Kerala Football League	None	Kerala Premier League					Kerala Premier League
State leagues	1	Formation of Kerala Football Association (KFA)	None										Kerala Premier League Second Division
Tournament			None		Kerala State Club Football Championship						Discontinued		
Tournament			Senior Inter-District Men's Football Championship										
Tournament			None	Sait Nagjee Football Tournament						Not conducted			
Women's
State leagues	1		None					Kerala Women's League	None			Kerala Women's League	

== Stadiums ==
The league and tournaments are generally played at the following Stadiums:

Stadium	Capacity	
Calicut Corporation EMS Stadium, Kozhikode	50,000	Kozhikode EMS Stadium
Jawaharlal Nehru Stadium (Kochi) †	40,000	
Greenfield International Stadium Trivandrum	50,000	
Malappuram District Sports Complex Stadium	30,000	
Thrissur Municipal Corporation Stadium	15,000	

Note. † denotes stadiums that have hosted international football matches.

== National clubs from Kerala ==
Current clubs from Kerala, that are playing in any of divisions of Indian football.

Club	Hometown	Founded	Best form
Kerala United FC	Kozhikode	1976	Kerala Premier League Champions (1): 2022-23
Kerala Police football team	Thiruvananthapuram	1984	Federation Cup Winners (2): 1990, 1991; Kerala State Club Football Championship Winners (6): 1985, 1987,1995, 1998, 2014, 2016
Kovalam Football Club	Thiruvananthapuram	2009	
Golden Threads FC	Kochi	2010	Kerala Premier League Champion (1): 2021–22
FC Kerala	Thrissur	2014	
Kerala Blasters FC	Kochi	2014	Indian Super League; Runners-up (3): 2014, 2016, 2021–22; Kerala Premier League Champions (1): 2019-20 (reserve team)
Gokulam Kerala FC	Kozhikode	2017	I-league Champions (2): 2020-21, 2021-22; Durand Cup Champions (1): 2019; Kerala Premier League Champions (2): 2017-18, 2020–21

== List of state level champions ==
	(KFL/KPL) champions	(KFL/KPL) Championship season	Kerala State Club Football Championship	Kerala State Club Football Championship seasons
SBI Kerala FC	6	2000/01, 2003/04, 2006/07, 2008, 2015, 2016	5	
FC Kochin	2	1998/99, 1999/00	-	
KSEB	2	2004/05, 2017	3	
Gokulam Kerala	2	2018, 2020/21	-	
Viva Kerala	1	2005/06	-	
Eagles FC	1	2014	-	
Indian Navy	1	2018/19	-	
Kerala Blasters FC Reserves	1	2019/20	-	
Golden Threads	1	2021/22	-	
Titanium FC	-	-	10	
Kerala Police	-	-	7	
KSRTC	-	-	3	
Premier Tyres FC	-	-	3	
AGORC, Thiruvananthapuram	-	-	2	
Central Excise RC	-	-	1	
Keltron FC	-	-	1	
FC Kochin	-	-	1	
Kochin Port Trust	-	-	1	
Josco FC	-	-	1	

== Notable footballers ==
The state of Kerala has contributed many legends to Indian football, such as:

- I M Vijayan
- V. P. Sathyan
- Jo Paul Ancheri
- Victor Manjila
- E.N. Sudhir
- Mohammed Rafi
- C.K. Vineeth
- Anas Edathodika
- Sahal Abdul Samad
- Rino Anto
- Rahul Kannoly Praveen
- Ashique Kuruniyan
- N.P Pradeep
- Krishnan Nair Ajayan
- Zakeer Mundampara
- Muhammed Sagar Ali
- Denson Devadas
- C. S. Sabeeth
- Mohamed Irshad
- Asif Kottayil
- Sushanth Mathew

== Notable academies ==
- A.C. Milan Academy Kozhikode under A.C. Milan
- Kerala Blasters FC Reserves and Academy
- Gokulam Football Foundation under Gokulam Kerala FC
- Muthoot Football Academy
- Parappur Football Academy (PFC KERALA)

== See also ==
- Sevens Football Association
- Football in Thrissur
