= Sports in Kerala =

Football is the most popular sport in Kerala, India, followed by cricket. Kerala Blasters are the most supported football club in the state, whereas Gokulam Kerala FC derives most of its support from the Malabar region. However, larger numbers of Keralites also follow sports such as volleyball, hockey, badminton, and kabaddi. There are many stadiums across different cities. Trivandrum has various sports venues such as Trivandrum International Stadium, Jimmy George Indoor Stadium, University Stadium (Thiruvananthapuram), Chandrasekharan Nair Stadium and Central Stadium, whereas Kochi has Jawaharlal Nehru International Stadium (Kochi) and Rajiv Gandhi Indoor Stadium. An international astro turf hockey stadium is located at Kollam city. Other major stadiums are EMS Stadium in Kozhikode, Malappuram District Sports Complex Stadium in Manjeri, Kannur Indoor Stadium in Kannur, Lal Bahadur Shastri Stadium in Kollam and many more. All these stadiums attest to the mass appeal of such sports among Keralites.

In addition to the multi-sport events organized by private entities, the government of Kerala conducts the annual Kerala State School Olympics for students from all districts in the state. This initiative aims to promote sports and physical education among school children.

The Sports and Youth Affairs Department of the Government of Kerala is the primary state agency responsible for the development and promotion of sports in Kerala.

== Football ==
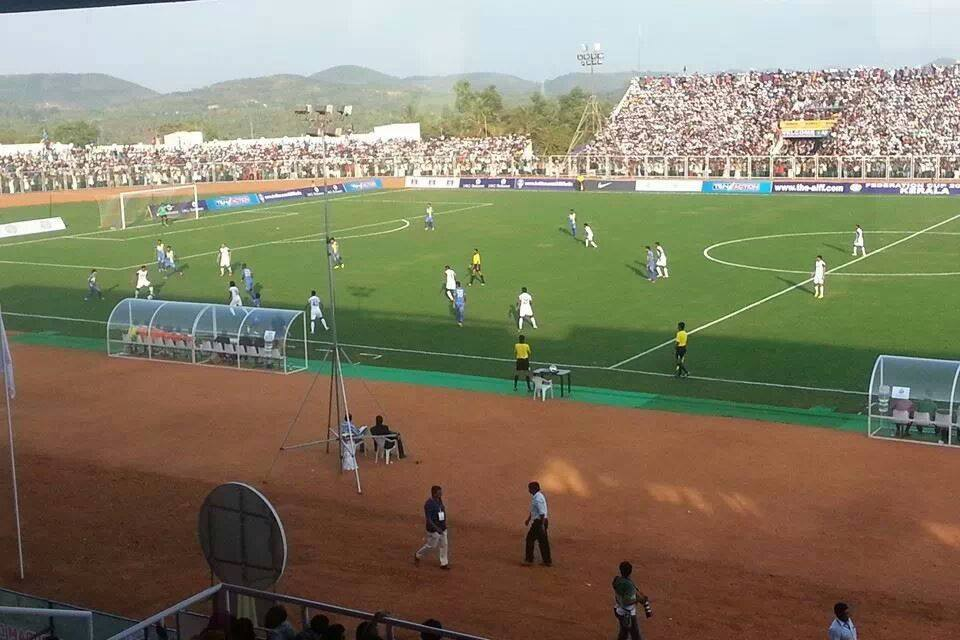
Football at the Malappuram District Sports Complex Stadium

Football enjoys the most fan following among the sports in the state. Football was introduced to the land of Kerala during pre-independence period by British officers of the Malabar Special Police (MSP) in the 20th century. MSP was camped in Malappuram and soon the natives began adopting the sport, who played in post-harvest paddy fields.

R B Ferguson Club is the oldest football club in Kerala and one of the oldest in India. The first Indian professional football club FC Kochin was from Kerala. The northern (Malabar region) and middle parts of Kerala, especially Malappuram and Thrissur, are famous for football-crazy. produced many Indian International footballers such as I. M. Vijayan, V. P. Sathyan, C. V. Pappachan, Jo Paul Ancheri, Victor Manjila, E.N. Sudhir and C. A. Liston.

Most of the professional football clubs in India have many Kerala footballers including Indian internationals Mohammed Rafi, C.K. Vineeth, Anas Edathodika, Sahal Abdul Samad, Rino Anto, Rahul Kannoly Praveen, Ashique Kuruniyan, N.P Pradeep, Krishnan Nair Ajayan, Zakeer Mundampara, Usman Ashik, Muhammed Sagar Ali, Denson Devadas, C. S. Sabeeth, Mohamed Irshad, Asif Kottayil, Sushanth Mathew, and many more.

=== Sevens football ===
Seven-a-side football is particularly popular in Malabar. Its tournaments runs from November to May. In Kerala and Tamil Nadu, All India Sevens Football used to register more attendance than 11’s football. In 1950s, national players who came for the Sait Nagjee Football Tournament in Kozhikode also participated in the local sevens tournaments. All India Sevens Football moved to enclosed grounds with ticketed entry by 1970s. As tournaments increased, the Sevens Football Association (SFA) was formed in 1983. Around 50 official tournaments are held each season. Sevens tournaments have been known for recruiting foreign players, mainly from Africa. Despite the popularity, the Kerala Football Association KFA did not recognise sevens football until 2017 and had even banned I. M. Vijayan once for playing All India Sevens Football. Talking about the issue, C. K. Vineeth said: We talk about academies, but let me ask you how many top-class footballers have these academies produced? All India Sevens Football have an endless number of top footballers. There was a time when Kerala didn't have a single football tournament. It was sevens which kept the game alive. Some of the football players who started their career in All India Sevens Football are I. M. Vijayan, Jo Paul Ancheri, V. P. Sathyan, Anas Edathodika, and Ashique Kuruniyan.

=== Indian Super League ===
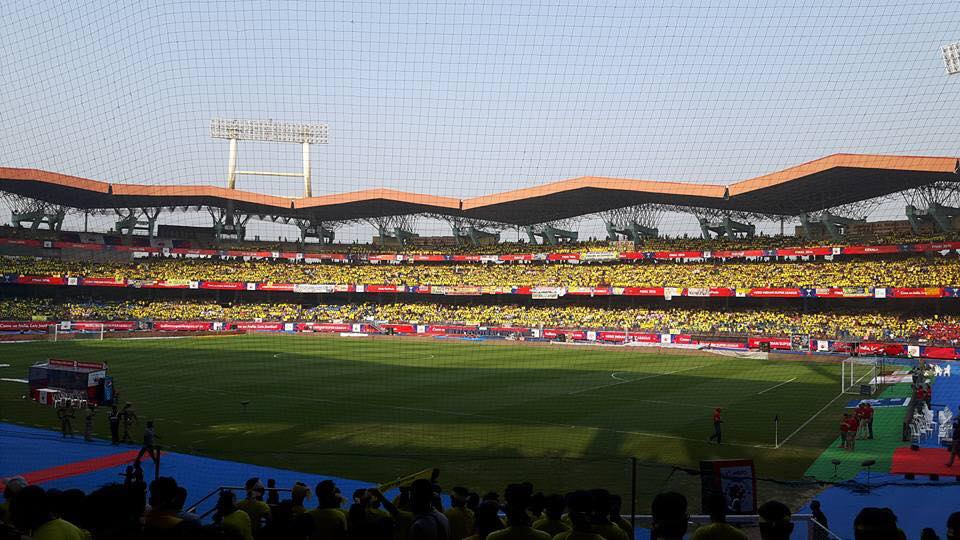
A view of Jawaharlal Nehru Stadium before the 2016 ISL final

Football became popular in Kerala decades ago. Kochi currently has a club called Kerala Blasters which competes in the Indian Super League, India's top football league. It is one of the most widely supported clubs in the country, as well as one of the most followed sports clubs from Asia on social media. The club is also the three time runner-up of the league.

=== I-League ===
Gokulam Kerala represents Kerala in the I-League. They went on to play for the first time in the 2017–18 I-League. Gokulam Kerala played all their matches at the EMS Stadium which is located in the heart of Kozhikode. Although the club did not have a good beginning, they went on to defeat big clubs like East Bengal, Mohun Bagan and Punjab FC by the end of the season. Travancore Royals FC from capital city Trivandrum is first fans owned football club in India.

=== Kerala Premier League ===
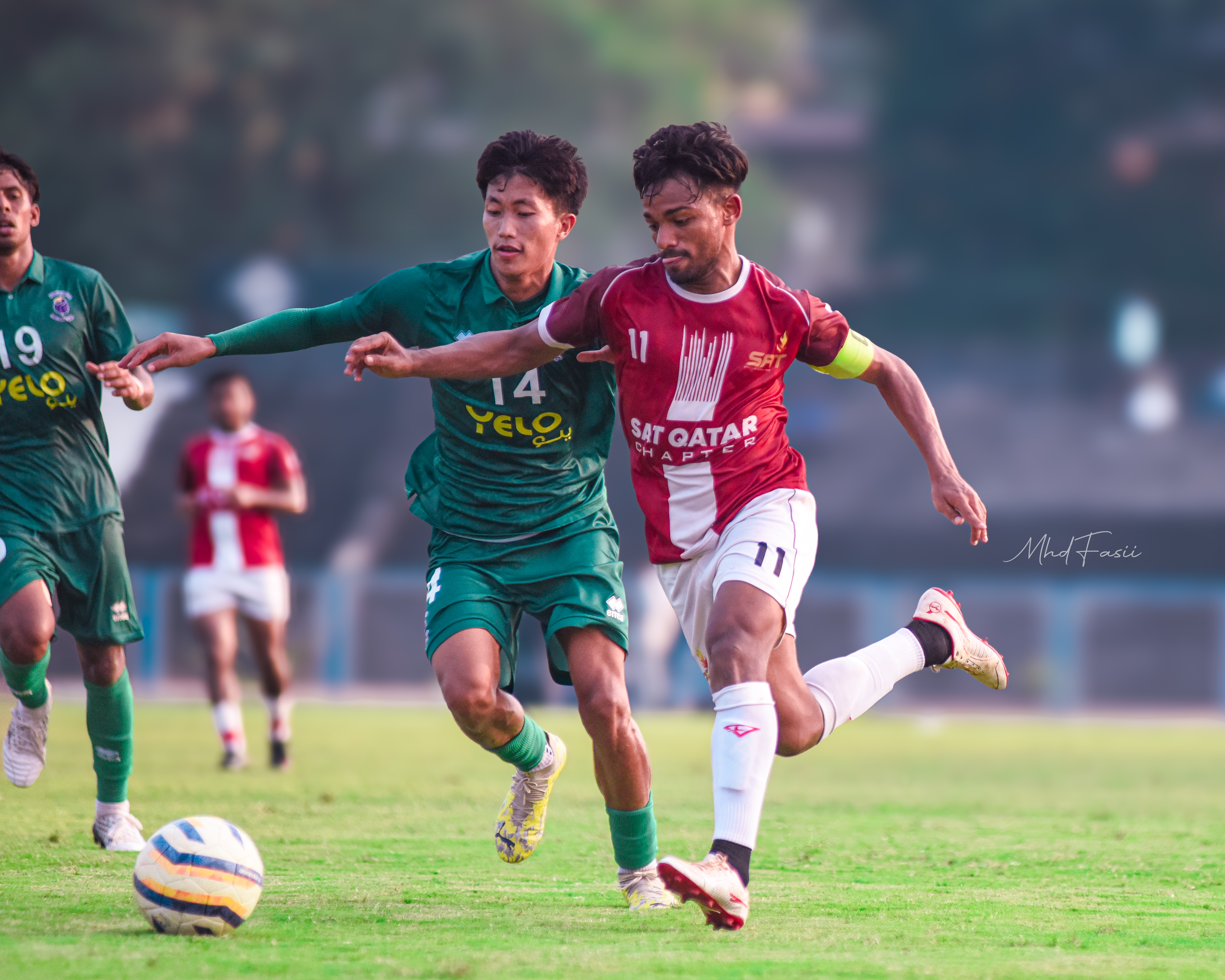

Kerala Premier League is a football league organised by Kerala Football Association played in the state of Kerala, India. It was founded in 2013, competed by 10 football clubs from the state.

== Hockey ==
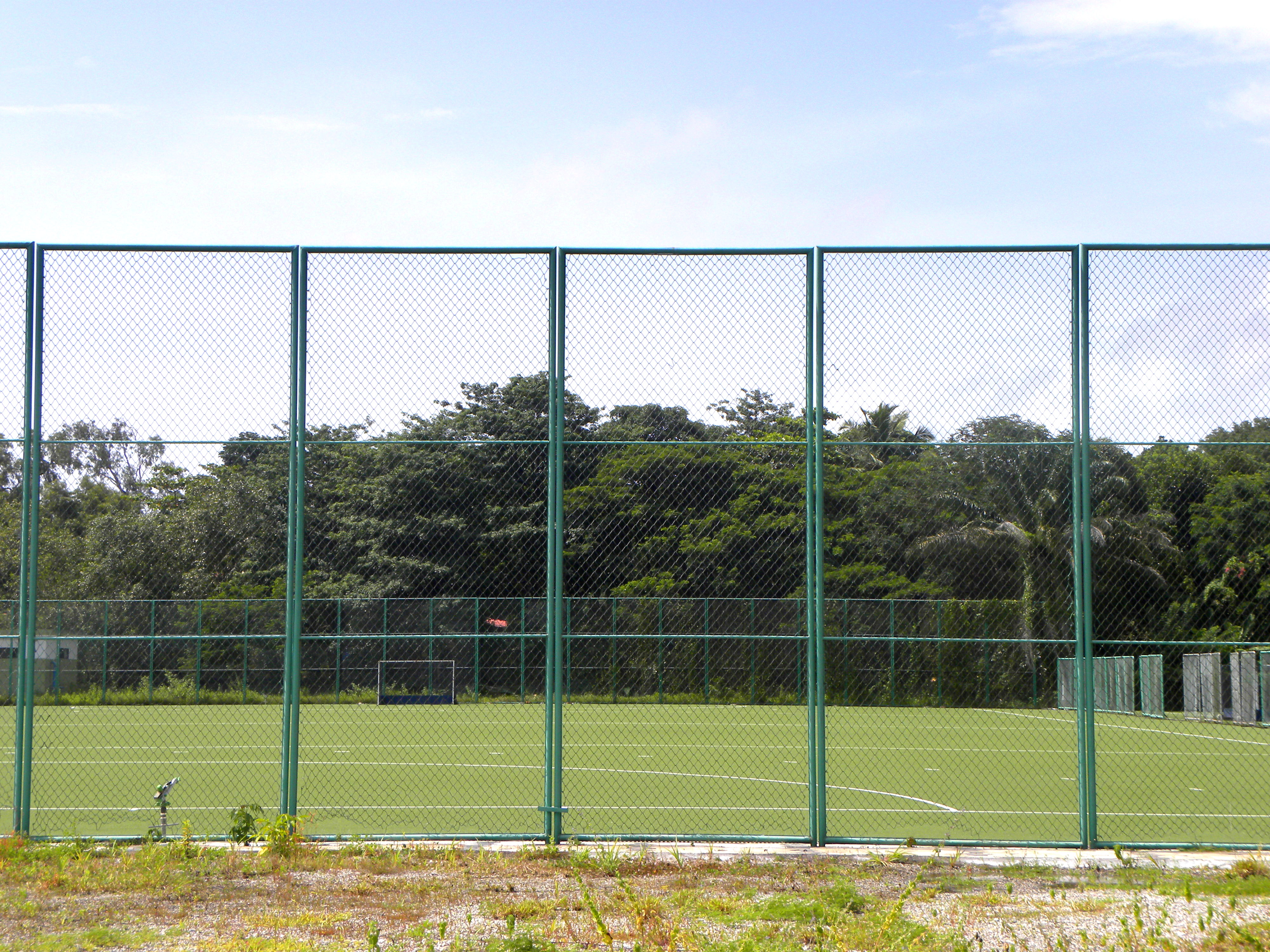
International Hockey Stadium in Kollam

Hockey is the pride game of city of Kollam and Kollam district. There are a lot number of Kollam city based players in Indian hockey team as well as Kerala Hockey Team.

The Government of Kerala has built a astro turf hockey stadium within the city, which is first of its kind in the state. International Hockey Stadium in Kollam is having a total seating capacity of 5,000 built at a cost of Rs.17.55 Crores (US$2.84 Million).The stadium is now the home-ground of Kerala Hockey Team. The most notable hockey player from Kerala is P R Sreejesh who has captained Indian team on several occasions.

== Athletics ==
Kerala has a rich history of producing noteworthy athletes such as T. C. Yohannan, Suresh Babu, P. T. Usha, Shiny Wilson, K. M. Beenamol, Tintu Lukka, Anju Bobby George, Preeja Sreedharan, and Renjith Maheshwary.

== Volleyball ==
Volleyball, another popular sport, is often played on makeshift courts on sandy beaches along the coast. Jimmy George, born in Peravoor, Kannur, was arguably the most successful volleyball player ever to represent India. At his prime he was regarded as among the world's ten best players.

== Cricket ==
In 1800, commander Arthur Wellesley, 1st Duke of Wellington of British East India Company made Thalassery (then Tellicherry) his administrative base. Wellesley and his colleagues used to play cricket in nearby ground. The local natives engaged as substitute players whenever the English officers were short of players. The locals were from the dhobi community and fishermen who lived along the beach. As a child, Colin Cowdrey played in Thalasserry. In 1830, the Tellicherry Cricket Club (TCC) was formed. The earliest record of a match in Thalassery is a report from Malayala Manorama of 1890, about a match between Thalassery and Kannur. By the 1930s, Thalassery had become a cricket hub, attracting teams from other states. During World War I (1914 – 1918), an exhibition match was conducted in Thalasserry for raising funds for the war.

Sreesanth (right-arm fast-medium, played 26 tests and 53 ODIs for India) is often regarded as the most successful cricketer from Kerala. Tinu Yohannan, son of Olympic long jumper T. C. Yohannan, also represented India, 3 times in tests and ODIs and Sanju Samson, Indian batsman, who already joined Indian team. K. N. Ananthapadmanabhan (344 first class wickets) is also a famous domestic cricket from Kerala, who took 344 wickets in first class cricket. Kochi Tuskers, a short lived former Indian Premier League team, represented Kochi, Kerala. Sports Hub Trivandrum and Jawaharlal Nehru International Stadium (Kaloor International Stadium) are the two international cricket stadiums in Kerala.

== Water-polo ==
Kerala is considered one of the best Indian states regarding water-polo. Malayalee clubs, teams, players, both women and men, are some of the most valuable in India, winning several national championships.

== Traditional sports ==
=== Vallam kali ===
Vallam kali is a boat race in the backwaters of Kerala. It is a form of canoe racing, and uses paddled war canoes. It is mainly conducted during the season of the Onam in spring. Vallam kali includes races of many kinds of paddled longboats and 'snake boats'.

=== Gatta gusthi ===
Gatta gusthi is a form of submission wrestling native to Kerala. It is competed inside an open ring on ground known as godha, usually on a beach; wrestlers are called phayalvans. The sport comprises around 100 techniques. Gatta gusthi was popular in the state until late 1960s with the arrival of freestyle wrestling and karate. The freestyle form is known simply as gusthi.

=== Nadan Panthu kali ===
Nadan panthu kali is a team sport played in rural villages of Kottayam district and Muvattupuzha Taluk. Villages like Manaracd, Puthuppally, Thottakkadu, Thirvanchoor, Meendam, Manganam, Kurichy, Valakom etc. are the places where this game is played. This game is played using a small ball made of leather and filled with cotton or coconut fibre. Each team consist of 7 players each. The game is played for six Innings (vara). Each inning, both the teams are allowed to do "vettu" where they initiate the scoring and other team prevents from the scoring. Scoring points follow the sequence like otta, petta, pidiyan, thalm, Keezhu, Indan and then it repeats. The team which score the most points from the innings wins. Annual Tournaments are conducted at these villages every year.

== List of stadiums in Kerala ==
The following is a list of major stadiums in Kerala in the order of their capacity.

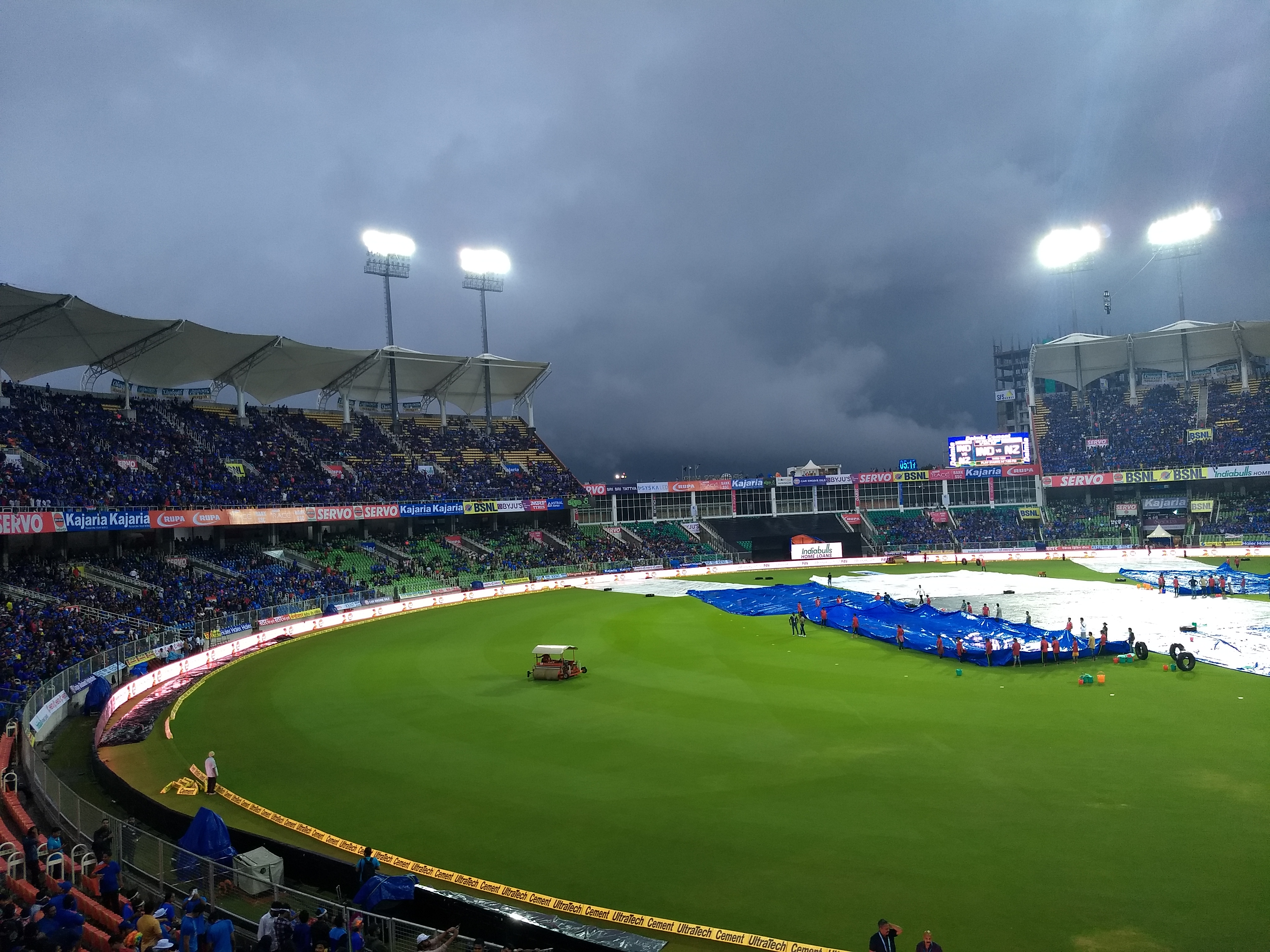
Sports Hub Trivandrum

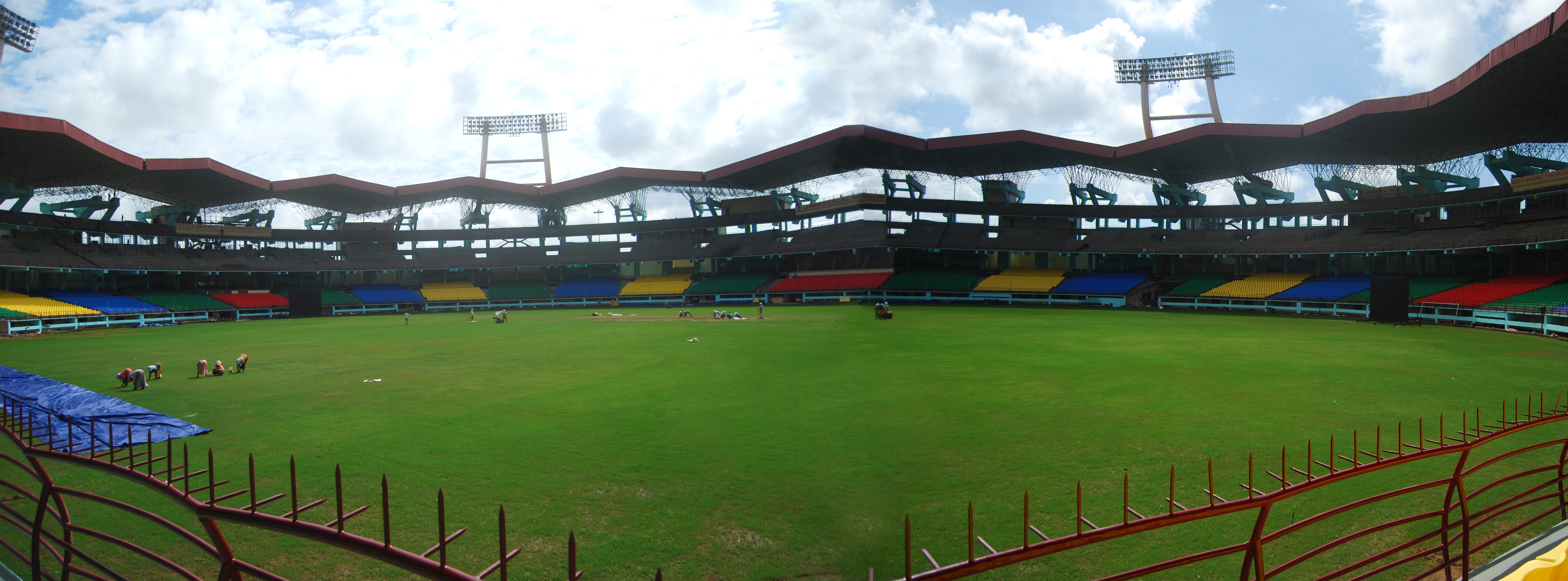
Jawaharlal Nehru International Stadium

#	Stadium	Capacity	City	District	Main Use	Tenants
1	Jawaharlal Nehru International Stadium	80,000	Kochi	Ernakulam	Cricket, Football	Kerala Blasters FC, Kerala Cricket Association
2	Sports Hub Trivandrum	50,000	Thiruvananthapuram	Thiruvananthapuram	Cricket, Football	Kerala Cricket Association
3	EMS Stadium	50,000	Kozhikode	Kozhikode	Football	Gokulam Kerala FC
4	Lal Bahadur Shastri Stadium	40,000	Kollam	Kollam	Football, Rugby	
5	Jawahar Municipal Stadium	30,000	Kannur	Kannur	Football	
6	Chandrasekharan Nair Stadium	25,000	Thiruvananthapuram	Thiruvananthapuram	Football	
7	Malappuram District Sports Complex Stadium	25,000	Manjeri	Malappuram	Football	Kerala United FC
8	University Stadium	20,000	Thiruvananthapuram	Thiruvananthapuram	Football, Cricket	
9	Krishnagiri Stadium	20,000	Wayanad	Wayanad	Cricket	Kerala Cricket Association
10	Thrissur Municipal Corporation Stadium	15,000	Thrissur	Thrissur	Football	FC Kerala
11	Maharaja's College Stadium	15,000	Kochi	Ernakulam	Multi-purpose	
12	Fort Maidan Stadium	10,000	Palakkad	Palakkad	Cricket	Kerala Cricket Association
13	Thrissur Aquatic Complex	10,000	Thrissur	Thrissur	Swimming	
14	Rajiv Gandhi Indoor Stadium	10,000	Kochi	Ernakulam	Multi-purpose	
15	FACT Stadium	5,000	Kochi	Ernakulam	Multi-purpose	
16	International Hockey Stadium	5,000	Kollam	Kollam	Hockey	
17	Jimmy George Indoor Stadium	2,000	Thiruvananthapuram	Thiruvananthapuram	Multi-purpose	
18	Pala Municipal Stadium		Pala	Kottayam	Football, Athletics	
19	Senior Ground		Kunnamkulam	Thrissur	Football, Athletics	
20	District Stadium		Kalpetta	Wayanad	Football, Athletics	
21	Dr. Ambedkar Stadium		Kochi	Ernakulam	Football	
