= Football in Thrissur =

Football is by far the most popular sport in Thrissur. The city and district has contributed with numerable players, clubs, coaches, tournaments and stadiums to Indian football.

== Players ==
- Jo Paul Ancheri, former Indian football team captain and the AIFF Player of the Year is from Thrissur.
- I. M. Vijayan is a former professional football player known as Karutha Muthu (Black Pearl). Vijayan was crowned Indian Player of the Year in 1993, 1997 and 1999.
- Victor Manjila is a former goalkeeper. He represented Kerala football team in the Santosh Trophy 1971, 1973, 1974, 1975, 1976, and 1979. Manjila was the captain of the Kerala team that played in 1975 Santosh Trophy. He represented India in the 1976 and 1977 President's Cup in South Korea and Kings Cup in Bangkok.
- C. V. Pappachan has represented Kerala in the Santosh Trophy tournament eight times. He was instrumental in Kerala Police, winning two Federation Cups.
- Rino Anto has played for Kerala Blasters, Mohun Bagan, Salgaocar F.C., Bengaluru FC and Atletico de Kolkata.
- Rahul Kannoly Praveen, commonly known as Rahul K P, plays as a winger or forward, most notably for Kerala Blasters. He has represented India at various youth levels including the FIFA U-17 World Cup 2017.

== Football clubs ==
- R B Ferguson Club, the first and the oldest football club in Kerala, was established on 20 February 1899 in Ollur. The club was named after the Kochi police superintendent, R B Ferguson. Later, the club renamed as Young Men's Football Club Ollur.
- In 1947, the second oldest club in Thrissur, Aurora Club was formed by the football loving fans of Ollur.
- Thrissur Gymkhana, has won many tournaments across Kerala.
- FC Kerala competed the I-League 2.
- FC Thrissur
- Red Star FC, another club promoted by team of entrepreneurs from Thrissur, headed by Jo Paul Ancheri.
- Parappur FC, a football club having coaching programs for children at Parappur district, supported by the South Indian Bank.
- Thrissur Magic FC, franchise football club that competes in the Super League Kerala. The club was established in 2024 for the league's inaugural season.

== Tournaments ==
The first football tournament in central Kerala was kicked off in 1925 by the Kochi Athletic Association. The tournament was held at the Palace Ground, now known as the Thrissur Municipal Corporation Stadium. Rama Varma XV, Maharaja of Cochin, has contributed 100 tola of silver for the tournament. The first winner was Church Mission Society High School Union, Thrissur. The tournament was winded up in 1930 when the first FIFA World Cup was started.N.I. David Memorial Trophy, once dubbed as the Football World Cup of Thrissur was started in 1996 by the then superintendent of police, in memory of N. I. David IPS who died in the office. The tournament had to be stopped temporarily in 2005, but was restarted in 2010.

== Coaches ==
- T.K. Chathunni, also known as the travelling coach, was a coach in National Football League (India) from 1997-1998. Hailing from Thrissur, he has coached Dempo S.C., Salgaocar, Mohun Bagan, Churchill Brothers FC Goa, Chirag United Club Kerala and Josco FC.
- Victor Manjila is a successful former coach of Kerala football team that won the 1993 Santosh Trophy.
- M. Peethambaran, former Kerala Santosh Trophy coach is also from Thrissur]

== See also ==
- Football in Kerala
- Sevens football
