= Kerala State Club Football Championship =

- Organiser(s): Kerala Football Association
- Founded: 1970
- Abolished: 2017
- Region: Kerala, India
- Last champions: SBI Kerala (5th title)
- Most championships: Titanium FC (10 titles)

Kerala State Club Football Championship was one of the most prestigious football tournaments organised by Kerala Football Association. Founded in 1970, it was a favourite competition for football in Kerala until the late 2000s.

== History ==
The inaugural tournament was won by AGORC, (Accountant General's Office Recreation Club) or commonly known as AG's Office team, by beating FACT Aluva.

=== Premier Tyres and formation of Titanium XI ===
Premier Tyres, Ernakulam reached its glory days during the 1970s, which produced prominent footballers like Xavier Pious, KP Sethumadhavan, Victor Manjila, Muhammed Basheer and PP Prasannan. Premier Tyres were later acquired by Apollo Tyres and club was shut.

Formed in 1972, Titanium XI produced some of the finest footballers during this period. Najumuddin and Thomas Sebastian were some of the great players who represented the club during its early years.

=== Formation of Kerala Police and glory days of Titanium XI ===
In 1984, the then Kerala Director General of Police (DGP) took initiative and formed Kerala Police Football Team. The Kerala Police team of the mid-80s had several names who went on to make a mark in Indian football such as V. P. Sathyan, U. Sharaf Ali, I. M. Vijayan, and Rajendran Kaladharan. The team, which trained at the Police Training College in Trivandrum, had a new signing soon after it was put together in the form of C. V. Pappachan, who had impressed manager Abdul Kareem with his displays, initially for the Calicut University team.

Titanium XI became champions in two consecutive seasons, 1989 and 1990.

=== Battle between Titanium XI and Kerala Police ===
While Titanium XI became back-to-back champions in 1992, 1993 and 1994, Kerala Police became champions in 1995, resisting Titanium XI.

=== 2000s ===
Titanium XI, Kerala Police and SBI Kerala were the three most consistent and successful teams during this era.

=== Scrapping of tournament ===
Not all teams in the Kerala Premier League took part in the State Club Football Championship, which led to scrapping the tournament in 2017.

"We place less importance for the State Club Football Championship and are looking to organise a Super Cup involving best teams from the KPL soon."

— Anilkumar, secretary of the Kerala Football Association

== Results ==
| Year | Winners (number of titles) | Runners-up |
|---|---|---|
| 1970 | AGORC, Thiruvananthapuram | FACT, Alwaye |
| 1971 | Tournament not held | |
| 1972 | Premier Tyres, Ernakulam (1) | AGORC, Thiruvananthapuram |
| 1973 | Titanium XI (1) | Spirit Youth Club |
| 1974 | Tournament not held | |
| 1975 | N/A | |
| 1976 | Premier Tyres, Ernakulam (2) | Titanium XI |
| 1977 | Premier Tyres, Kalamassery | Customs & Central Excise |
| 1978 | Titanium XI (2) | Premier Tyres, Kalamassery |
| 1979 | N/A | |
| 1980 | N/A | |
| 1981 | N/A | |
| 1982 | Kochin Port Trust | Premier Tyres, Ernakulam |
| 1983 | Central Excise RC | Lucky Star Club |
| 1984 | KSRTC (1) | Titanium XI |
| 1985 | KSRTC (2) | Titanium XI |
| 1986 | KSRTC (3) | Titanium XI |
| 1987 | Kerala Police (1) | Central Excise RC |
| 1988 | Kerala Police (2) | Titanium XI |
| 1989 | Titanium XI (3) | KSRTC |
| 1990 | Titanium XI (4) | Kerala Police |
| 1991 | Keltron FC | KSRTC |
| 1992 | Titanium XI (5) | Keltron FC |
| 1993 | Titanium XI (6) | Kerala Police |
| 1994 | Titanium XI (7) | Kerala Police |
| 1995 | Kerala Police (3) | Titanium XI |
| 1996 | State Bank of Travancore (1) | Kerala Police |
| 1997 | FC Kochin | State Bank of Travancore |
| 1998 | Kerala Police (4) | Keltron FC |
| 1999 | KSEB | Central Excise RC |
| 2000 | Titanium XI (8) | KSEB |
| 2001 | Tournament not held | |
| 2002 | State Bank of Travancore (2) | Titanium XI |
| 2003 | Tournament not held | |
| 2004 | Titanium XI (9) | - |
| 2005 | Titanium XI (10) | Viva Kerala |
| 2006 | KSEB (1) | State Bank of Travancore |
| 2007 | Tournament not held | |
| 2008 | State Bank of Travancore (3) | Titanium XI |
| 2009 | unknown - | |
| 2010 | Josco FC | State Bank of Travancore |
| 2011 | KSEB (2) | Golden Threads FC |
| 2012 | AGORC, Thiruvananthapuram | State Bank of Travancore |
| 2013 | Kerala Police (5) | State Bank of Travancore |
| 2014 | Kerala Police (6) | Eagles F.C. |
| 2015 | State Bank of Travancore (4) | AGORC, Thiruvananthapuram |
| 2016 | Kerala Police (7) | KSEB |
| 2017 | State Bank of Travancore (5) | Gokulam Kerala FC |

== Records ==
| Club | Wins | First final won | Last final won | Runners-up | Last final lost | Total final appearances |
|---|---|---|---|---|---|---|
| Titanium XI | 10 | 1973 | 2005 | 8 | 2008 | 18 |
| Kerala Police | 7 | 1987 | 2016 | 4 | 1996 | 11 |
| State Bank of Travancore | 5 | 1996 | 2017 | 4 | 2006 | 9 |
| KSEB | 3 | 1999 | 2011 | 2 | 2016 | 5 |
| KSRTC | 3 | 1984 | 1986 | 2 | 1991 | 5 |
| Premier Tyres, Ernakulam | 2 | 1972 | 1976 | 1 | 1982 | 3 |
| Central Excise RC | 1 | 1983 | 1983 | 2 | 1999 | 3 |
| Keltron FC | 1 | 1991 | 1991 | 2 | 1998 | 3 |
| AGORC, Thiruvananthapuram | 2 | 1970 | 2012 | 2 | 2015 | 2 |
| Premier Tyres, Kalamassery | 1 | 1977 | 1977 | 1 | 1978 | 2 |
| FC Kochin | 1 | 1997 | 1997 | | | |
1
| Kochin Port Trust | 1 | 1982 | 1982 | | | |
1
| Josco FC | 1 | 2010 | 2010 | | | |
1
Gokulam Kerala FC
| 1 | 2017 | 1 | | | | |
Viva Kerala
| 1 | 2005 | 1 | | | | |
Lucky Star Club - Kannur
| 1 | 1983 | 1 | | | | |
Customs & Central Excise
| 1 | 1977 | 1 | | | | |
Spirit Youth Club - Kannur
| 1 | 1973 | 1 | | | | |
FACT, Alwaye
| 1 | 1970 | 1 | | | | |

== See also ==
- All India Sevens Football
- Indian football league system
- State leagues
- Super League Kerala
- Kerala Premier League
- Malabar Premier League
