= Krishnagiri (disambiguation) =

Krishnagiri may refer to:

- Krishnagiri, a city in the Indian state of Tamil Nadu
- Krishnagiri district, in the same state
- Krishnagiri taluk, in the district
- Krishnagiri block, in the district
- Krishnagiri (Lok Sabha constituency), a constituency of the Parliament of India
- Krishnagiri (state assembly constituency), a constituency of the Legislative Assembly of Tamil Nadu
- Krishnagiri, Wayanad district, a village in the Indian state of Kerala
- Krishnagiri, Kurnool district, a village in the Indian state of Andhra Pradesh.
