= T. G. Purushothaman =

Indian footballer and manager

Personal information
- Full name: Thekkathara Gopalakrishnan Purushothaman
- Date of birth: 6 June 1979 (age 47)
- Place of birth: Kerala, India
- Height: 1.77 m (5 ft 10 in)
- Position: Goalkeeper

Team information
- Current team: Odisha (head coach)

Youth career
- Mahindra United
- –2000: Calicut University Club

Senior career*
| Years | Team | Apps | (Gls) |
| 2000–2001 | SBI Kerala | 38 | (4) |
| 2003–2004 | Vasco SC | 32 | (2) |
| 2004–2006 | Mahindra United | 60 | (8) |
| 2006–2008 | Viva Kerala | 70 | (6) |

Managerial career
- 2010–2014: Josco (assistant coach)
- 2014–2020: FC Kerala (manager)
- 2020–2021: Kerala Blasters B (manager)
- 2021–2022: Kerala State Football Team (assistant coach)
- 2022–2023: Kerala Blasters B (assistant coach)
- 2023–2024: Kerala Blasters U-18 (manager)
- 2024–2026: Kerala Blasters FC (assistant coach)
- 2024–2025: Kerala Blasters (interim)
- 2025–: Odisha (manager)
- * Club domestic league appearances and goals

Thekkathara Gopalakrishnan Purushothaman (born 6 June 1979), popularly known as T. G. Purushothaman, is an Indian football manager and a former professional player, who currently works as the head coach of the Indian Super League club Odisha.

== Playing career ==
Born on 6 June 1979, Purushothaman spent his youth career by playing for Kerala Varma College and University of Calicut. In 2000, he signed his first senior contract with SBT. After an impressive performance with the side, he was included in the Kerala football team's squad for the 2001–02 Santosh Trophy tournament. His first achievement as a player also came in that tournament as the Kerala team won the championship. He later signed for the National Football League Vasco Goa in 2003 ahead of their new season. In 2004, Purushothaman was signed by T. K. Chatunni in the newly formed club Viva Kerala. In that year, he moved to Mahindra United F.C. ahead of the 2005–06 National Football League. The season gave positive results to Mahindra, as they rose to win the league title, and the 2005 Federation Cup, thus helping Purushothaman to win two major silverware in his career. In the same year, he won the Santosh Trophy for the second time in his career with Kerala. On 11 June 2007, it was announced that Purushothaman was signed by Viva Kerala for the 2007–08 I-League campaign. He spent his last years of playing career with the Kerala club, before retiring in 2008 to pursue his career in coaching.

== Coaching career ==
=== Early coaching years ===
After retiring from professional football, he joined then Ernakulam Second Division and later I-League 2nd Division club Josco FC in 2010, as their assistant coach under T.K. Chathunni. He was their assistant manager for the 2011 and 2013 I-League 2nd Division seasons respectively. He spent four years with the club before joining FC Kerala in 2014. At FC Kerala, which was founded in 2014, he also served as one of their directors. Under his assistance, the club made their second division debut in the 2017–18 season. Purushothaman also served as the assistant coach of the Kerala football team for the 2019–20 Santosh Trophy tournament.

=== Kerala Blasters ===
On 6 February 2021, Kerala Blasters announced that they have roped in Purushothaman as the new head coach of their reserves team. While being the manager of the Blasters' reserve team, he was again chosen by KFA as the assistant manager of the Kerala football team for the 2021–22 Santosh Trophy, who eventually won the tournament. On 10 July 2023, Kerala Blasters announced the appointment of Purushothaman as the new assistant coach for their first team on a three-year contract, until 2026.

On 17 December 2024, in the wake of dismissal of Mikael Stahre from the head coach position due to club's poor performance in the league, Purushothaman along with the club's reserve team head coach and head of youth development Tomasz Tchórz was appointed as interim managers of the Blasters. Their first game as the interim managers at the club was against Mohammedan SC on 22 December, which the Blasters won 3–0. Purushothaman later made history, as the Blasters registered their first ever away win against southern rivals Chennaiyin FC in the league on 30 January 2025 under his helm.

== Managerial statistics ==
As of match played 24 October 2026

Managerial record by team and tenure
| Team | Nat | From | To | Record | | | | | Ref |
| Team | Nat | From | To | G | W | D | L | Win % | Ref |
|---|---|---|---|---|---|---|---|---|---|
| Odisha | (India) | 7 February 2026 | Present | 16 | 2 | 7 | 7 | 12.50 | |
| Total | | | | 16 | 2 | 7 | 7 | 12.50 | — |

== Honours ==
=== As a player ===
- Santosh Trophy: 2001–02, 2004–05
- National Football League: 2005
- Federation Cup: 2005

=== As a manager ===
- Santosh Trophy: 2021–22 (assistant)
