= Malabar Premier League =

- Founded: 2 March 2015
- Country: India
- Number of clubs: 8
- Current champions: MSP Delta Force (1st title)
- Current: 2015 Malabar Premier League

The Malabar Premier League was a franchise football league in the Malabar region. The league kicked off its inaugural season on 7 April 2015 with eight teams.

== History ==
Following the success of the Indian Super League for football in India and the 2015 National Games of India, which were hosted by Kerala, it was announced that the Malappuram District Sports Council, with support from the Kerala Football Association, would launch the Malabar Premier League. The goal of the league would be to get young footballers from the district into a proper playing environment and make football a more professionalized sport in the area. On 2 March 2015, the official logo of the league was unveiled, as well as the initial franchises.

== Venue ==
For the inaugural season of the Malabar Premier League, the venue was Kottappadi Football Stadium.

== Sponsorship ==
Period	Sponsor	Tournament name
2015	(India) Kairali TMT	Kairali TMT Malabar Premier League

== Teams ==
Team	Location
Basco Blasters	Othukkungal
Ernad Stallions	Manjeri
MSP Delta Force	Malappuram
Spartans Tirur	Tirur
Soccer Sultans	Areekode
Super Fighters	Malappuram
Titans	Mampad
Valluvanadu Warriors	Mankada

== See also ==
- Kerala State Club Football Championship
- Super League Kerala
- Kerala Premier League
- Football in Kerala
