= 2013–14 Kerala Premier League =

Inaugural season of Kerala premier League

- Season: 2013–14
- Country: India
- Teams: 12
- Champions: Eagles F.C (1st title)
- Matches played: 33
- Goals scored: 139 (4.21 per match)

The 2013–14 Kerala Premier League Season was the inaugural season of the Kerala Premier League, a professional football league played in Kerala, India.

The tournament had kicked off in March, but due to the elections and then rains the 2013–14 Kerala Premier League became a long drawn affair. The preliminary round Group A of the Kerala Premier League was played between 15 and 23 March with Eagles FC beating AG's Office from Thiruvananthapuram in the final 3–1, but both teams progressed to the final round in which they await the top two teams from Group B. Eagles FC and AG's Office, Thiruvananthapuram had qualified from Group A; while State Bank of Travancore and Kerala XI had made it from Group B into the semifinals of the competition. Eagles FC are the champions of the Kerala Premier League after beating State Bank of Travancore 3–1 in the final of the championship on Monday, 26 May.

== Teams ==
Group A, Kottayam	Group B, Kozhikode
AG's Trivandrum	Quartz SC
Basco Malappuram	Central Excise
Cochin Port Trust	Golden Threads FC
Eagles F.C	Titanium
Kerala Police	State Bank of Travancore
KSEB	Kerala XI

== Group stage ==
Group A

Pos	Team	Pld	W	D	L	GF	GA	GD	Pts	Qualification
1	Eagles F.C	5	5	0	0	21	4	+17	15	Advance to Semi-finals
2	AGS Office	5	4	0	1	14	8	+6	12	Advance to Semi-finals
3	KSEB	5	3	0	2	15	7	+8	9	
4	Kerala Police	5	1	1	3	3	8	−5	4	
5	Cochin Port Trust	5	1	0	4	7	13	−6	3	
6	Basco	5	0	1	4	4	23	−19	1	

Rules for classification: 1) points; 2) goal difference; 3) goals scored; 4) head-to-head result.

Group B

Pos	Team	Pld	W	D	L	GF	GA	GD	Pts	Qualification
1	State Bank of Travancore	5	4	0	1	20	4	+16	12	Advance to Semi-finals
2	Kerala XI	5	3	1	1	18	4	+14	10	Advance to Semi-finals
3	Titanium	5	3	0	2	8	5	+3	9	
4	Central Excise	5	2	0	3	8	10	−2	6	
5	Golden Threads FC	5	2	0	3	6	14	−8	6	
6	Quartz SC	5	0	0	5	3	26	−23	0	

Rules for classification: 1) points; 2) goal difference; 3) goals scored; 4) head-to-head result.

== Matches ==
Group A

15 March 2014

Basco, Malappuram	0-6	KSEB

Kottayam
15 March 2014

Eagles F.C.	3-1	AG's Office, Trivandrum

Kottayam
16 March 2014

Kerala Police	1-0	Cochin Port Trust

Kottayam
16 March 2014

Eagles F.C.	9-0	Basco, Malappuram

Kottayam
17 March 2014

KSEB	4-1	Cochin Port Trust

Kottayam
17 March 2014

Kerala Police	1-2	AG's Office, Trivandrum

Kottayam
18 March 2014

AG's Office, Trivandrum	4-2	Basco, Malappuram

Kottayam
18 March 2014

Eagles F.C.	3-2	KSEB

Kottayam
19 March 2014

Basco, Malappuram	1-1	Kerala Police

Kottayam
19 March 2014

Eagles F.C.	3-1	Cochin Port Trust

Kottayam
20 March 2014

Cochin Port Trust	1-4	AG's Office

Kottayam
21 March 2014

Kerala Police	0-2	KSEB

Kottayam
22 March 2014

Cochin Port Trust	3-1	Basco, Malappuram

Kottayam
22 March 2014

AG's Office	3-1	KSEB

Kottayam
22 March 2014

Eagles F.C.	3-0	Kerala Police

Kottayam

Group B

6 May 2014

Quartz SC	2-5	Central Excise

Koyilandy
6 May 2014

Golden Threads FC	2-5	Titanium

Koyilandy
17 May 2014

Quartz SC	1-2	Golden Threads FC

Koyilandy
17 May 2014

State Bank of Travancore	2-2	Kerala XI

Koyilandy
18 May 2014

Kerala XI	4-1	Central Excise

Koyilandy
18 May 2014

State Bank of Travancore	2-1	Titanium

Koyilandy
19 May 2014

Titanium	1-0	Quartz SC

Koyilandy
19 May 2014

Central Excise	0-2	Golden Threads FC

Koyilandy
20 May 2014

Golden Threads FC	0-3	Kerala XI

Koyilandy
20 May 2014

State Bank of Travancore	9-0	Quartz SC

Koyilandy
21 May 2014

Kerala XI	0-1	Titanium

Koyilandy
21 May 2014

State Bank of Travancore	2-1	Central Excise

Koyilandy
22 May 2014

Central Excise	1-0	Titanium

Koyilandy
23 May 2014

Kerala XI	9-0	Quartz SC

Koyilandy
23 May 2014

Golden Threads FC	0-5	State Bank of Travancore

Koyilandy

Semifinals

24 May 2014

Eagles F.C.	4-1	Kerala XI

Kozhikode
25 May 2014

AG's Office, Trivandrum	1-3	State Bank of Travancore

Kozhikode

Finals

26 May 2014

Eagles F.C.	3-1	State Bank of Travancore

Kozhikode
