= 2015 Malabar Premier League =

Malabar Premier League
- Season: 2015
- Champions: MSP Delta Force (1st title)
- Matches: 15
- Goals: 55 (3.67 per match)
- All statistics correct as of 1 August 2015.

The 2015 Malabar Premier League season was the first season of the Malabar Premier League, the franchise football league for the Malabar region of the Indian state of Kerala. The league kicked off on 7 April.

== Teams ==
TEAM	Location	Sponsors
Basco Blasters	Othukkungal	AJFAN Dates & Nuts
Ernad Stallions	Manjeri	Royal Travels
MSP Delta Force	Malappuram	Shifa Al-Jaseera
Spartans Tirur	Tirur	Theyyampattil Furniture
Soccer Sultans	Areekode	Gokulam Group
Super Fighters	Malappuram	Malayil Group
Titans	Mampad	Prince Group
Valluvanadu Warriors	Mankada	P. T. Group

== Matches ==
11 April 2015	Basco Blasters	1-3	Super Fighters	Kottappadi Football Stadium
	Hameem Jamal A. K. 14'		Bharathan K. K. 74'; Mohammed Rafi N. B. 86'; Mousoof Nisan M. A. 90+1'

12 April 2015	MSP Delta Force	1-1	Valluvanadu Warriors	Kottappadi Football Stadium
	Jimshad U. 2'		Anantha Murali V. 29'

13 April 2015	Titans	3-2	Spartans	Kottappadi Football Stadium
	Afsal 29'; Nasrudheen 73' 81'; Shafeeq (red card) 78'		Shameem M. 51'; Abdul Jaleel C. 90+1'

14 April 2015	Ernad Stallions	4-3	Soccer Sultans	Kottappadi Football Stadium
	Salman K. 7'; VP Suhair 12' 24'; Usman Ashik 46'; Hashim Malik (red card) 60'		Mohamed Shafi Odakkal 36' 81'; Ahamed Mallick K. 90'

15 April 2015	Basco Blasters	2-1	Valluvanadu Warriors	Kottappadi Football Stadium

16 April 2015	MSP Delta Force	2-4	Super Fighters	Kottappadi Football Stadium
	Firos Kalathingal 10' 59'		Sajeer H. H. 20'; Midhun Welet 22'; Akhiljith A. S. 51' 72'

18 April 2015	Titans	1-2	Soccer Sultans	Kottappadi Football Stadium
	Nasrudheen 75'		Sabith K. 10'; Abdul Basim Nalakath 59'

19 April 2015	Ernad Stallions	3-1	Spartans	Kottappadi Football Stadium
	Javeed O. K. 41'; Hafsal 68'; Hajmal 81'		Shameem M. 25'

20 April 2015	Super Fighters	2-1	Valluvanadu Warriors	Kottappadi Football Stadium
	NP Pradeep 67'; 71'		Munavar K. 73'

21 April 2015	Basco Blasters	1-3	MSP Delta Force	Kottappadi Football Stadium
	Abdul Rahman C. A. 40'		Firos Kalathingal 12'; Imshad U. 20'; Shihad 73'

22 April 2015	Soccer Sultans	0-1	Spartans	Kottappadi Football Stadium
	Danish Mekkuth (red card) 81'		Abdul Basith 82'

23 April 2015	Ernad Stallions	4-0	Titans	Kottappadi Football Stadium
	Usman Ashik 50' 54' 82'; Hafsal 61'		Mahsoom C. T. (red card) 79'

Semi-finals

25 April 2015	Super Fighters	1-1 (a.e.t.) (4-2 p)	Spartans	Kottappadi Football Stadium
	R. Kannan 90+3'		Jimmi George 8'

26 April 2015	Ernad Stallions	2-2 (a.e.t.) (3-4 p)	MSP Delta Force	Kottappadi Football Stadium
	V P Suhair 40'; Salman K. 74'		Shihad Nelliparamban 56'; Firos Kalathingal 75'

Final

28 April 2015	MSP Delta Force	3-0	Super Fighters	Kottappadi Football Stadium
	Jipson Justus 73'; Mahin P. Hussain 78'; Gani Ahamed Nigam 85'
