= South Africa 'A' cricket team in India in 2015 =

| | India 'A' | South Africa 'A' |
- Dates: 18 August – 28 August 2015
| Captains | Ambati Rayudu | Quinton de Kock |

Test series
- Result: India 'A' won the 2-match series 1–0

The South Africa A cricket team toured India to play two first-class matches against the India A. The two first-class matches were played at Wayanad.

== Squads ==
| India A | South Africa A |
|---|---|
| Ambati Rayudu (c); Baba Aparajith; Shreyas Iyer; Abhimanyu Mithun; Karun Nair; Pragyan Ojha; Vijay Shankar (wk); Ankush Bains; Jayant Yadav; Abhinav Mukund; Axar Patel; Ishwar Pandey; Karn Sharma; Sheldon Jackson; Jiwanjot Singh; Shardul Thakur | Dane Vilas (c); Temba Bavuma; Gihahn Cloete; Theunis de Bruyn; Marchant de Lange; Beuran Hendricks; Reeza Hendricks; Keshav Maharaj; Dane Paterson; Dane Piedt; Omphile Ramela; Lonwabo Tsotsobe; Stiaan van Zyl; Hardus Viljoen; David Wiese |

== Test Series ==
1st Unofficial Test

18–21 August 2015
Scorecard

| South Africa A | v | India A |
| 542 (138.5 overs); Quinton de Kock 113(102); Axar Patel 4/115 (39 overs) | | 204 (66.3 overs); Shreyas Iyer 49(61); Dane Piedt 5/85 (24 overs) |
| 105/1d (35 overs); Reeza Hendricks 61(69); Axar Patel 1/37 (15 overs) | | 309/4 (107.2 overs); Karun Nair 114*(192); Keshav Maharaj 2/79 (36 overs) |

Match Drawn.
Krishnagiri Stadium, Wayanad, Kerala

- Africa 'A' won the toss and elected to bat

2nd Unofficial Test

21–28 August 2015
Scorecard

| India A | v | South Africa A |
| 260 (89.5 overs); Quinton de Kock 113(102); Axar Patel 4/115 (39 overs) | | 204 (66.3 overs); Shreyas Iyer 49(61); Dane Piedt 5/85 (24 overs) |
| 105/1d (35 overs); Reeza Hendricks 61(69); Axar Patel 1/37 (15 overs) | | 309/4 (107.2 overs); Karun Nair 114*(192); Keshav Maharaj 2/79 (36 overs) |

Match Drawn.
Krishnagiri Stadium, Wayanad, Kerala

- Africa 'A' won the toss and elected to bat
