= K. Udayakumar =

Indian volleyball player

- Born: 1960; Mararikulam, Alappuzha, Kerala, India
- Died: 19 September 2014 (aged 53–54); Thiruvananthapuram
- Resting place: Mararikulam, Alappuzha
- Occupations: Indian Police, ADC to Kerala Governor
- Spouse: Lekha
- Children: Anjali Uday, Pallavi Uday
- Parent(s): Karanuakara Kurup; Ammani Amma
- Awards: Arjuna Award, G. V. Raja Award

Karunakarakurup Udayakumar was an India men's national volleyball team player known for his allround skills at offence and defence and a member of the Indian volleyball team during what many consider as the golden era of Indian volleyball. A former captain of the Indian national volleyball team, Udayakumar was a member of the team, which included Jimmy George and Cyril C. Valloor, that won the Bronze medal in the 1986 Asian Games held in Seoul. Udayakumar played for the Kerala police Volleyball team. The Government of India, in 1991, honoured his services to Indian volleyball by bestowing on him, the second highest Indian sports award, the Arjuna Award.

== Career ==
Udayakumar was active in club level professional volleyball, too. Opening with Kerala State Electricity Board team, he played for Travancore Titanium, before joining Kerala Police team, in 1985, where he ended his club career. In between, he also played for a professional team in Qatar for a while.

After retirement as a player, he coached Dubai Police team and was also active at the organizational level. He was a member of the organising committee for the 2013 National Games held at Thiruvananthapuram in November – December 2013.

Udayakumar's job career also followed his club commitments. Starting at Kerala State Electricity Board and a short stint at Travancore Titanium, he joined Kerala Police as a Deputy Superintendent of Police and rose in ranks to become the Aide de Camp to the Governor of Kerala.

On 19 September 2014, Udayakumar suffered a massive cardiac arrest, while on duty as the aide de camp, and was declared dead, later, at the hospital. He was married to Lekha, a teacher at the Christ Nagar School, and the couple had two daughters, Anjali and Pallavi.

In 1991, he was conferred with the Arjuna Award for his contribution to the Indian volleyball.

== See also ==
- Jimmy George
- Cyril C. Valloor
