= 2014–15 Kerala Premier League =

2nd season of Kerala Premier League

Kerala Premier League
- Season: 2014–15 (2nd Season)
- Champions: State Bank of Travancore (1st title)
- Matches: 15
- Goals: 47 (3.13 per match)

Women's Kerala Premier League
- Season: 2014–15 (1st Season)
- Champions: Wayanad Women's FC (1st title)

The 2014–15 Kerala Premier League Season was the second season of the Kerala Premier League, a professional football league played in Kerala since 2013–14. The Season included a Women's Edition for the first time. The season features eight teams. The season kicked off on 2 May and ended on 7 May, while the semi-finals began on 9 May, which will conclude with the final match on 11 May. The final was played between State Bank of Travancore and Kerala Police on 11 May 2015. State Bank of Travancore were crowned as champions defeating Kerala Police 5–1 in the final. Wayanad FC emerged as the winners of the Women's Edition.

== Structure ==
It featured the best eight teams of Kerala affiliated to the KFA competing for the Trophy. The league was played in a two single format where the teams were divided into two groups of four teams each. Matches were played in Wayanad. Top two teams from each group qualified for the semifinals. Three points were awarded for a win, one for a draw and zero for a loss. At the end of the season a table of the final League standings was determined, based on the following criteria in this order: points obtained, goal difference, and goals scored.

== Sponsorship ==
Ramco Cements were the sponsors of the league from the inaugural season(2014). Hence the league was known as Ramco Kerala Premier League

== Men's ==
=== Teams ===
This is the completed club list for the 2014–15 season.

Group A	Group B
State Bank of Travancore	Kerala Police
Titanium	AG's Office Thiruvananthapuram
Central Excise Kochi	FC Kerala
Nova Arapetta	Kerala U21

=== Group stage ===
Group A

Pos	Team	Pld	W	D	L	GF	GA	GD	Pts	Qualification
1	State Bank of Travancore	3	3	0	0	10	0	+10	9	Advance to Semi-finals
2	Central Excise Kochi	3	2	0	1	5	3	+2	6	Advance to Semi-finals
3	Nova Arapetta	3	1	0	2	3	9	−6	3	
4	Titanium	3	0	0	3	4	10	−6	0	

Rules for classification: 1) points; 2) goal difference; 3) goals scored; 4) head-to-head result.

Group B

Pos	Team	Pld	W	D	L	GF	GA	GD	Pts	Qualification
1	Kerala Police	3	2	1	0	7	3	+4	7	Advance to Semi-finals
2	AG's Office Thiruvananthapuram	3	1	1	1	4	4	0	4	Advance to Semi-finals
3	FC Kerala	3	0	3	0	3	3	0	3	
4	Kerala XI	3	0	1	2	3	7	−4	1	

Rules for classification: 1) points; 2) goal difference; 3) goals scored; 4) head-to-head result.

=== Matches ===
Group A

2 May 2015

SBT	3–0	Titanium

Wayanad
2 May 2015

Central Excise Kochi	1–0	Nova Arapetta

Wayanad
3 May 2015

SBT	1–0	Central Excise Kochi

Wayanad
3 May 2015

Titanium	2–3	Nova Arapetta

Wayanad
5 May 2015

SBT	6–0	Nova Arapetta

Wayanad
5 May 2015

Titanium	2–4	Central Excise Kochi

Wayanad

Group B

4 May 2015

FC Kerala	1–1	Kerala U21

Wayanad
4 May 2015

Kerala Police	2–1	AG's Office

Wayanad
6 May 2015

Kerala Police	1–1	FC Kerala

Wayanad
6 May 2015

Kerala U21	1–2	AG's Office

Wayanad
7 May 2015

Kerala Police	4–1	Kerala U21

Wayanad
7 May 2015

AG's Office	1–1	FC Kerala

Wayanad

Semifinal

9 May 2015

SBT	0–0	AG's Office
Penalties
	5–3

Wayanad
10 May 2015

Kerala Police	1–1	Central Excise Kochi
Penalties
	5–4

Wayanad

Final

11 May 2015

SBT	5–1	Kerala Police

Wayanad

== Women's ==
Group A	Group B
Wayanad Women's FC	Kovalam Women's FC
Alleppey Women's FC	Marthoma College Women's FC
Dinesh Soccer Women's Club	Kollam Football Academy
Quartz Women's FC	Kannur Women's FC

=== Matches ===
Final

30 May 2015

Wayanad WFC	2–0	Marthoma College WFC

Wayanad
