= Simon Sundararaj =

Indian footballer

Personal information
- Full name: Simon Sundararaj Swamidas
- Date of birth: 9 November 1937 (age 88)
- Place of birth: Tanjore, Madras Presidency, British India
- Height: 1.73 m (5 ft 8 in)
- Position: Midfielder

Senior career*
Years	Team	Apps	(Gls)
- South Indian Railways

International career
- India

Managerial career
- Kerala
- * Club domestic league appearances and goals

Simon Sundararaj (born 9 November 1937) is a retired Indian footballer who played as a midfielder for the India national team. He represented South India Railways in the club level. As a coach, he coached the Kerala state team to its first Santosh Trophy win in 1973.

== Early life ==
Sundararaj was born on 9 November 1937, in Tanjore (now Thanjavur) in the erstwhile Madras Presidency, (now in Tamil Nadu) of British India. His uncle was a footballer who played for the local club, Tanjore United. Sundararaj, as a kid followed him to all his matches, and subsequently took to football. He holds a diploma in Physical education.

== Career ==
Playing for the India national team, Sundararaj wore jersey number 23. He was the first from Tamil Nadu to play in the national team. At the club level, he played for Southern Railways.

India qualified for the 1960 Olympics in Rome, as the only Asian team. India entered the Olympics winning the Asian qualifiers beating a higher ranked Indonesian team 6–3 on aggregate. Sundararaj finished the tournament scoring three goals. In the group stage at the Games, India played its first match against Hungary losing the match 1–2. The next match against France was drawn at 1–1. Failing to qualify for the next round, India played its final group stage match Peru and lost the match 1–2. Sundararaj scored India's lone goal in the match with a 30-yard strike. Ever since, India failed to qualify for the Olympic Games. This made Sundararaj the last Indian to score at the Games. Following a cartilage tear that he sustained during the Madras United Club tournament the following year, he lost his place in the team that won the gold at the 1962 Asian Games in Jakarta.

Following his playing career, Sundararaj qualified himself as a coach at the Netaji Subhas National Institute of Sports, Patiala. He coached and managed the Kerala state team that won its first Santosh Trophy in 1973.
