= Super League Kerala =

Association football league in Kerala, India

- Organising body: Kerala Football Association; Unifed Football Sports Development Pvt Ltd; Mathew Joseph (Director & CEO)
- Founded: 2023; 3 years ago
- Country: India
- Number of clubs: 6
- Current champions: Kannur Warriors (2025 Season)
- Current Shield Winners: Calicut (2026 Season)
- Most championships: Calicut; Kannur Warriors (1 title each)
- Most Shield Winners: Calicut (1 title)
- Broadcasters: Zee Network; TV by e& Zee5
- Sponsors: White Gold; Amul
- Website: superleaguekerala.com
- Current: 2026 Super League Kerala

The Super League Kerala (SLK), is a men's professional franchise football league in the state of Kerala, India, organised by the Kerala Football Association and Scoreline Sports. The league currently operates outside the Indian football league system and does not follow promotion and relegation.

== History ==
=== Formation and launch ===
The Super League Kerala (SLK) was established in 2024 as a franchise-based football competition jointly organised by the Kerala Football Association (KFA) and Scoreline Sports Private Limited. Conceived as an ambitious initiative to develop football at the grassroots level, the league aimed to professionalise the state’s football ecosystem and provide a platform for young players to compete alongside experienced professionals.

The six franchises of the inaugural edition were unveiled at a grand launch event held at the Grand Hyatt, Bolgatty, Kochi, in May 2024. The event was attended by several prominent figures from Indian football and sports administration, including former India internationals I. M. Vijayan, Bhaichung Bhutia, and Jo Paul Ancheri, along with commentator Charu Sharma, actress Mandira Bedi, and officials from the All India Football Federation (AIFF) and the Kerala Sports Council.

=== Inaugural franchises and ownership ===
The inaugural edition featured six regional franchises representing key footballing centres of Kerala:

- Thiruvananthapuram Kombans FC – owned by Gowri Lakshmi Bayi (of the Travancore royal family), Dr Mohamed Ilyas Sahadulla (KIMS Hospital), K C Chandrahasan (Kerala Travels), and T J Mathews (Kovalam FC).
- Forca Kochi FC – initially owned by tennis legend Mahesh Bhupathi, CEO of SGSE.
- Thrissur Magic FC – co-owned by Kaz Patafta (Chairman & CEO, Brisbane Roar FC), Benoit Joseph (Magnus Sports), and Mohammed Rafeeq (Nusym Technologies).
- Calicut FC – owned by tech entrepreneur V. K. Mathews, Chairman of the IBS Group.
- Malappuram FC – co-owned by V. A. Ajmal (Bismi Group), Dr Anvar Ameen Chelat (SAT Tirur FC, Grand Hypermarkets), and Baby Neelambra (Saudi Indian Football Forum).
- Kannur Warriors FC – co-owned by M. P. Hassan Kunhi (Kannur International Airport Ltd), Mibu Jose Nettikadan (Castle Group, Doha), Praveesh Kuzhuppilly (Asset Homes), and Shameem Backer (Wayanad FC).

=== Ownership transitions and rebranding ===
Following the initial announcement, several franchises underwent ownership changes and rebranding ahead of the inaugural season.

- The Kochi franchise was taken over by a consortium led by Malayalam actor Prithviraj Sukumaran, Supriya Menon, Nasly Mohammed, Shameem Backer C. K., Mohammed Shyjal K., and Praveesh Kuzhipally. The team was subsequently renamed Forca Kochi FC.
- The Thrissur franchise was acquired by film producer Listin Stephen, owner of the production house Magic Frames, and rebranded as Thrissur Magic FC.
- The Kannur franchise, initially known as Kannur Squad FC, was later renamed Kannur Warriors FC.

=== Objectives and vision ===
The SLK was envisioned to serve as a bridge between Kerala’s local football circuits and India’s premier competitions such as the Indian Super League and I-League. By partnering with investors, sports entrepreneurs, and global stakeholders, the league aimed to elevate the state’s footballing infrastructure, coaching quality, and player professionalism. The organisers projected that the SLK would create new career pathways for Kerala’s players and coaches, attract regional fan communities, and position the state as a key hub in Indian football’s development pipeline.

== Competition format ==
Super League Kerala features six franchise-based clubs representing different regions of the state. The league follows a double round-robin format, in which each club plays the other twice. At the end of the league stage, the top four clubs advance to the semi-finals, which are played as single-leg knockout fixtures. The winners of the semi-finals meet in the final, where the champion of Super League Kerala is decided.

== Clubs ==
Clubs locations

Club	City
Calicut	Kozhikode
Forca Kochi	Kochi
Kannur Warriors	Kannur
Malappuram	Malappuram
Thiruvananthapuram Kombans	Thiruvananthapuram
Thrissur Magic	Thrissur

== Stadiums ==
Calicut FC	Forca Kochi	Kannur Warriors
EMS Corporation Stadium	Jawaharlal Nehru Stadium (Kochi)	Jawahar Municipal Stadium
Capacity: 35,000	Capacity: 41,000	Capacity: 30,000
Malappuram FC	Thiruvananthapuram Kombans	Thrissur Magic
Payyanad Stadium	Chandrasekharan Nair Stadium	TMC Stadium
Capacity: 20,000	Capacity: 15,000	Capacity: 15,000

== Broadcasters ==
The first season of the Super League Kerala aired on Star Sports First (Malayalam) and streamed on Hotstar and ManoramaMAX (for Gulf viewers). On July 21, 2025, the Super League Kerala signed 5 year contract with Sports.com (SEGG media) for broadcasting rights for a record $11.6 M. The second season aired on Sports.com. The third season streamed on Zee5.

== Results ==
=== League shields and SLK trophies by years ===
Season	Regular season	Playoffs			Top goalscorer(s)	Goals
Season	Winners	Winners	Score	Runners–up	Top goalscorer(s)	Goals
2024	Did not exist	Calicut	2-1	Forca Kochi	(Brazil) Dori	5
2025	Did not exist	Kannur Warriors	1-0	Thrissur Magic	(Brazil) John Kennedy	8
2026	Calicut					

== All-time league table ==
Pos	Team	Pld	W	D	L	GF	GA	GD	Pts
1	Calicut	20	12	6	2	39	20	+19	42
2	Kannur Warriors	20	7	8	5	29	30	−1	29
3	Thiruvananthapuram Kombans	20	6	7	7	25	26	−1	25
4	Malappuram	20	5	9	6	31	29	+2	24
5	Thrissur Magic	20	6	4	10	13	22	−9	22
6	Forca Kochi	20	5	4	11	20	30	−10	19

Source: Super League Kerala

== See also ==
- Football in Kerala
- Kerala State Club Football Championship
- Malabar Premier League
