= Cyril C. Valloor =

Indian volleyball player (born 1961)

Cyril Chakkunny Valloor
- Born: December 1, 1961 (age 64)
- Height: 6 ft 3 in (191 cm)
- Spouse: Alice Cyril Valloor
- Children: Ricyla Cyril Valloor; Ricky Cyril Valloor
- Parent(s): Capt. V. J. Chakkunny (Father); K. K. Mary (Mother)
- Awards: G. V. Raja Award (1981); Arjuna Award (1988); Intelligence Bureau Award (1988); Jimmy George Award (1991)
- Volleyball career

National team
India

Cyril Chakkunny Valloor is a former India men's national volleyball team player from Kerala. He represented the country in several competitions, including the 1986 Seoul Asian Games where he captained the Indian team that won the bronze medal. This was arguably one of the best volleyball team sent by India to an Asian games. In the 1980s, Indian volleyball was a force to reckon with when Jimmy George and Cyril Valloor played for the country.

In 1986, he was conferred the Arjuna Award for his contribution to the Indian volleyball. Cyril is an alumnus of Calicut University.
