= Thiruvananthapuram District Football Association =

- Sport: Football
- Jurisdiction: District
- Abbreviation: TDFA
- Affiliation: All India Football Federation (AIFF)
- Regional affiliation: Kerala Football Association (KFA)
- Headquarters: Thiruvananthapuram
- President: Rajeev.K

Official website
- www.dfatvm.com

Thiruvananthapuram District Football Association (TDFA) is the sport governing body responsible for association football in and around the Indian district of Thiruvananthapuram. It is affiliated with the State Association, the Kerala Football Association, which in turn is affiliated with the All India Football Federation (AIFF).

== History ==
The Thiruvananthapuram District Football Association (TDFA), one of the oldest, is the official District body for the development, conduct, and organization of football in the district of Thiruvananthapuram and its suburbs.

== Notable players ==
- Jobby Justin
- M Rajeev Kumar
- Ganeshan
- Thomas Sebastian
- Vinu Jose

== Thiruvananthapuram Football Leagues ==
The TDFA organizes the Thiruvananthapuram Football League with 8 divisions, containing approximately 46 club sides and 213 matches.

=== Men ===
- Elite League
- Super Division
- A Division
- B Division
- C Division
- D Division
- E Division
- F Division
- G Division
