= R B Ferguson Club =

Football club in Kerala, India

R B Ferguson Club has been one of the oldest football clubs in Kerala and one of the oldest clubs in India. Established on 20 February 1899 in Thrissur, it was also the oldest football club in the southern part of India. The club was famed and played a huge role in promoting football in Kerala during the early 1900s.

== History ==
The club was named after the Kochi Police superintendent R B Ferguson. The club was established near St. Antony's Forane Church in Ollur. Later on, it was renamed and run as Young Men's Football Club.
