= 1973–74 Santosh Trophy =

Tournament details
- Country: India
- Dates: 1–27 December 1973

Final positions
- Champions: Kerala (1st title)
- Runners-up: Railways

Tournament statistics
- Top goal scorer(s): TKS Mani (Kerala) and Shanmugham (Karnataka) (7 goals)

The 1973–74 Santosh Trophy was the 30th edition of the Santosh Trophy, the main State competition for football in India. Kerala won the Santosh Trophy for the first time beating Railways 3–2 with their captain Mani scoring all the three goals.

The tournament was held in the Maharaja's College Ground, Ernakulam, Kerala. The matches were played under newly installed floodlights. On most of the days, there were two matches, played between 5.45 pm and 9.30 pm. The tournament was inaugurated by the home minister K. Karunakaran. The match-ball for the first day was dropped from a helicopter. Stands that could hold 20,000 – 25,000 spectators were built in the ground and it had an overall capacity of around 50,000.

== Preliminary knockout matches ==
1 December 1973

Services	1–0	Uttar Pradesh

Maharajas College Ground, Ernakulam, Kerala
2 December 1973

Manipur	2–0 (a.e.t.)	Madhya Pradesh

Maharajas College Ground, Ernakulam, Kerala

Score 0-0 at full time

3 December 1973

Assam	3–0	Haryana

Maharajas College Ground, Ernakulam, Kerala

== League matches ==
=== Pool A ===
Pos	Team	Pld	W	D	L	GF	GA	GD	Pts	Qualification
1	Bengal	3	2	1	0	11	2	+9	5	Advance to Quarter-finals
2	Punjab	3	1	2	0	4	3	+1	4	Advance to Quarter-finals
3	Rajasthan	3	1	0	2	3	6	−3	2	
4	Assam	3	0	1	2	2	9	−7	1	

Source: Malabar Herald
10 December 1973

Rajasthan	2–0	Assam

Maharajas College Ground, Ernakulam, Kerala
10 December 1973

Bengal	1–1	Punjab

Maharajas College Ground, Ernakulam, Kerala
11 December 1973

Bengal	5–1	Rajasthan

Maharajas College Ground, Ernakulam, Kerala
11 December 1973

Assam	2–2	Punjab

Maharajas College Ground, Ernakulam, Kerala
14 December 1973

Punjab	1–0	Rajasthan

Maharajas College Ground, Ernakulam, Kerala
14 December 1973

Bengal	5–0	Assam

Maharajas College Ground, Ernakulam, Kerala

=== Pool B ===
Pos	Team	Pld	W	D	L	GF	GA	GD	Pts	Qualification
1	Maharashtra	3	2	1	0	8	1	+7	5	Advance to Quarter-finals
2	Andhra Pradesh	3	1	2	0	11	3	+8	4	Advance to Quarter-finals
3	Tamil Nadu	3	1	1	1	4	1	+3	3	
4	Gujarat	3	0	0	3	2	20	−18	0	

Source: Malabar Herald
6 December 1973

Tamil Nadu	4–0	Gujarat

Maharajas College Ground, Ernakulam, Kerala
6 December 1973

Andhra Pradesh	1–1	Maharashtra

Maharajas College Ground, Ernakulam, Kerala
7 December 1973

Maharashtra	1–0	Tamil Nadu

Maharajas College Ground, Ernakulam, Kerala
7 December 1973

Andhra Pradesh	10–2	Gujarat

Maharajas College Ground, Ernakulam, Kerala
9 December 1973

Maharashtra	6–0	Gujarat

Maharajas College Ground, Ernakulam, Kerala
9 December 1973

Andhra Pradesh	0–0	Tamil Nadu

Maharajas College Ground, Ernakulam, Kerala

=== Pool C ===
Pos	Team	Pld	W	D	L	GF	GA	GD	Pts	Qualification
1	Railways	3	2	1	0	5	3	+2	5	Advance to Quarter-finals
2	Services	3	1	1	1	3	3	0	3	Advance to Quarter-finals
3	Goa	3	0	3	0	2	2	0	3	
4	Bihar	3	0	1	2	3	5	−2	1	

Source: Malabar Herald
4 December 1973

Services	1–0	Bihar

Maharajas College Ground, Ernakulam, Kerala
4 December 1973

Goa	0–0	Railways

Maharajas College Ground, Ernakulam, Kerala
5 December 1973

Bihar	1–1	Goa

Maharajas College Ground, Ernakulam, Kerala
5 December 1973

Railways	2–1	Services

Maharajas College Ground, Ernakulam, Kerala
8 December 1973

Goa	1–1	Services

Maharajas College Ground, Ernakulam, Kerala
8 December 1973

Railways	3–2	Bihar

Maharajas College Ground, Ernakulam, Kerala

=== Pool D ===
Pos	Team	Pld	W	D	L	GF	GA	GD	Pts	Qualification
1	Kerala	3	2	1	0	8	5	+3	5	Advance to Quarter-finals
2	Karnataka	3	2	0	1	11	4	+7	4	Advance to Quarter-finals
3	Delhi	3	0	2	1	1	2	−1	2	
4	Manipur	3	0	1	2	1	10	−9	1	

Source: Malabar Herald
12 December 1973

Karnataka	7–0	Manipur

Maharajas College Ground, Ernakulam, Kerala
12 December 1973

Kerala	1–1	Delhi

Maharajas College Ground, Ernakulam, Kerala

Kerala goal-keeper Victor Manjila fractured his shoulder and missed the rest of the tournament. His replacement Sethumadhavan got injured one match later. Ravindran kept in the rest of the matches and the final.

13 December 1973

Karnataka	1–0	Delhi

Maharajas College Ground, Ernakulam, Kerala
13 December 1973

Kerala	3–1	Manipur

Maharajas College Ground, Ernakulam, Kerala
15 December 1973

Delhi	0–0	Manipur

Maharajas College Ground, Ernakulam, Kerala
15 December 1973

Kerala	4–3	Karnataka

Maharajas College Ground, Ernakulam, Kerala

== Quarter-finals ==
16 December 1973

Bengal	2–1	Services

Maharajas College Ground, Ernakulam, Kerala
18 December 1973

Maharashtra	4–1	Karnataka

Maharajas College Ground, Ernakulam, Kerala
19 December 1973

Railways	2–0	Punjab

Maharajas College Ground, Ernakulam, Kerala
20 December 1973

Kerala	5–0	Andhra Pradesh

Maharajas College Ground, Ernakulam, Kerala

== Semifinal ==
December 1973

Railways	v	Bengal

Maharajas College Ground, Ernakulam, Kerala
December 1973

Kerala	2–1	Maharashtra

Maharajas College Ground, Ernakulam, Kerala

== Final ==
27 December 1973

Kerala	3–2	Railways
Mani 38', 65', 80'

Maharajas College Ground, Ernakulam, Kerala

== Squads ==
- Kerala : KP Sethumadhavan, Victor Manjila, C Ravindran (goal keepers); John J John, Ratnakaran, Cheeku, MO Jose, Mitran, Usman, Jacob and Prasannan (backs); TA Jaffar (vice-captain), Poulose, Abdul Hameed and Devanand (half-backs); Blassy George, KP Williams, T.K. Subramaniam "Mani" (captain), Najimuddin, Xavier Pius, R.K. Perumal, Titus Kurian, MR Joseph and Basheer (forwards). Reserve : Babu Nair, Mohandas, Ramachandran, Vijayan, Kunhi Mohamed, Gopalakrishnan, Solaman and Majeed. Coach : Simon Sundararaj
- Bengal : Goal-keepers : Tarun Bose, Prasanta Mitra (Mohun Bagan) and Gobinda Guha Thakurta (Kalighat); Backs : Sudhir Karmakar, Prabir Mazumder (East Bengal) and Kajal Dhali (Mohun Bagan); Stoppers : Syed Naeemuddin (Mohun Bagan), Ashok Banerjee, Shyamal Ghosh (East Bengal) and Anwar Hussain (Mohammadan Sporting); Halves : Gautam Sarkar, Samaresh Chowdhury (East Bengal), Mohan Singh (Mohun Bagan) and Tapan Bose (Kidderpore); Forwards : Swapan Sengupta, Mohammad Habib, Mohammad Akbar, Subhash Bhowmick (captain) (East Bengal), Surajit Sengupta (Mohun Bagan), Latifuddin (Mohammadan Sporting), Anu Chowdhury (Rajasthan) and Ranjit Mukherjee (Kidderpore) Habib withdrew with an injury.
