= Krishnan Nair Ajayan =

Indian footballer (born 1979)

Krishnan Ajayan
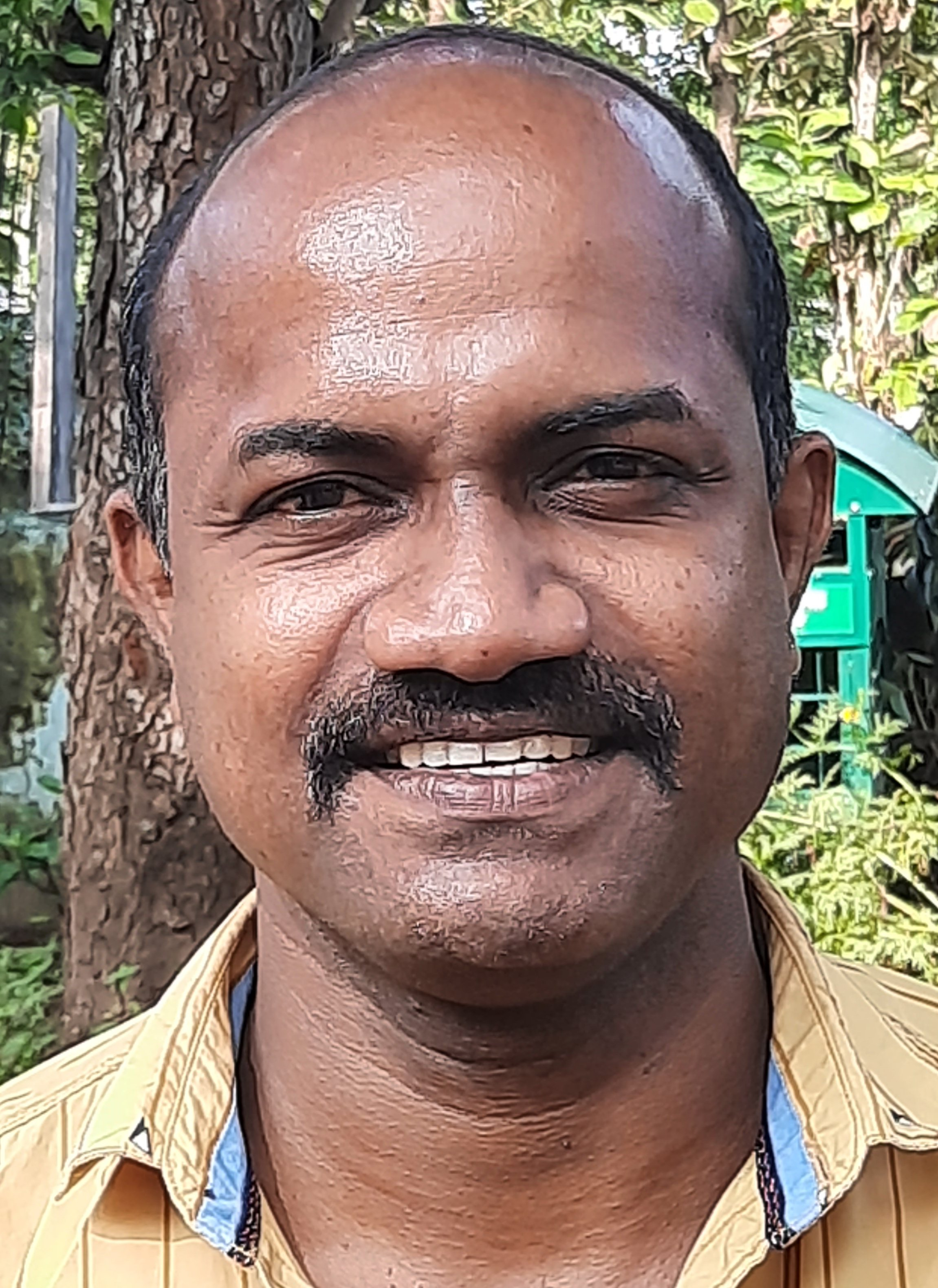

Personal information
- Date of birth: 30 May 1979 (age 47)
- Place of birth: Chadayamangalam, Kerala, India
- Height: 1.74 m (5 ft 8 1/2 in)
- Position: Midfielder

Senior career*
Years	Team	Apps	(Gls)
2000–2004	SBT		
2004–2005	Vasco		
2005–2010	Mahindra United		
2010–2011	Pune		
2011–2012	Chirag United Kerala		

International career^{‡}
2002	India U23		
2002–2008	India	12	(1)
- * Club domestic league appearances and goals ‡ National team caps and goals as of 17 April 2011

Krishnan Ajayan Nair (born 30 May 1979) is an Indian football player. He last played for Chirag United Club Kerala in the I-League, as a midfielder.

== Career ==
Young Ajayan would play for S.V.H. School in his hometown where he won several trophies.

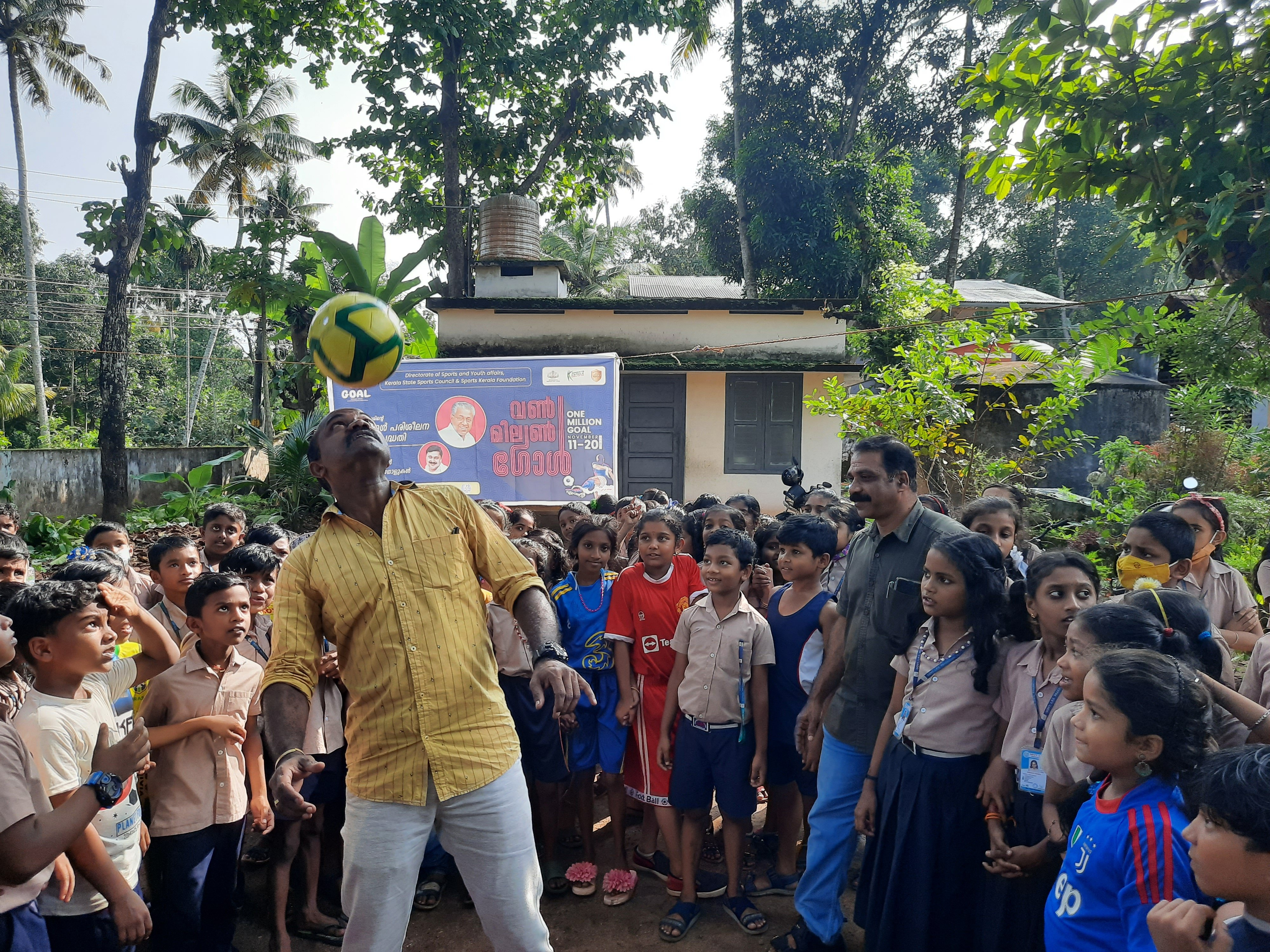
K Ajayan Indian football player giving instructions to student players, GLPS Prakkulam

At the age of 11, Ajayan represented Mahatma Club in the popular Seven's tournament. He played for N.S.S. College and even the famous Mahatma Gandhi College, Trivandrum.

Ajayan was part of the Kerala University team where thrice they were state winners and twice winners of the South Zone.

Ajayan successfully completed his graduation and was awarded the Bachelor of Arts (Economics) degree with a first class.

Ajayan then joined SBT in 2000 where he played for the 4 years. Then in 2004–05 he played for Vasco S.C. In 2005, he signed for Mahindra United and was the captain of the Mahindra United football team until the club was closed down in 2010. Later, he transferred to Pune F.C. In 2011, he switched to Chirag United Club Kerala.

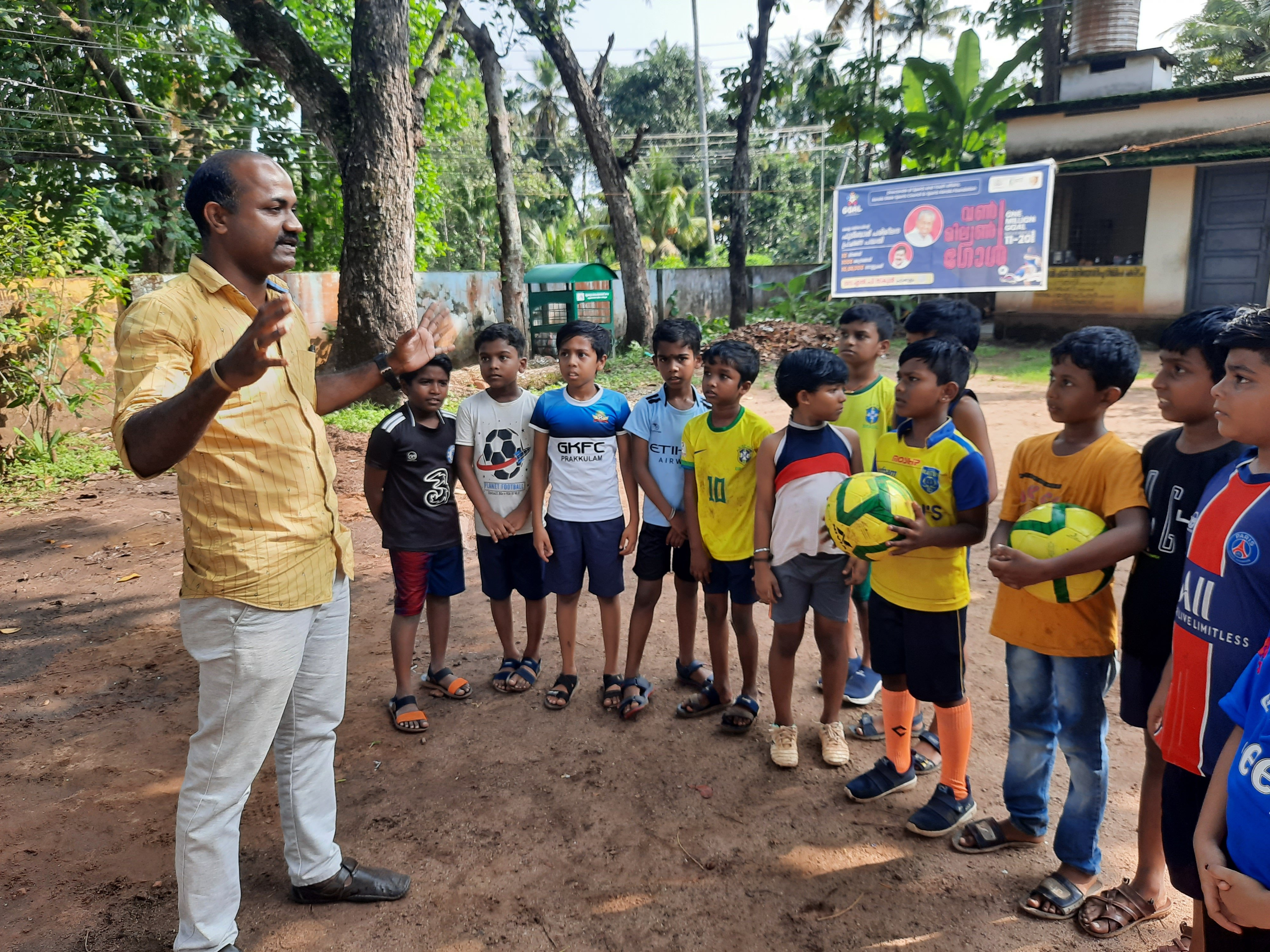
K Ajayan Indian football player giving instructions to student players, GLPS Prakkulam

== Statistics ==
National team	Year	Apps	Goals
India	2002	1	0
India	2005	3	0
India	2006	2	0
India	2007	5	1
India	2008	1	0
India	Total	12	1

=== International Goals ===
Goal	Date	Venue	Opponent	Score	Result	Competition
1	23 August 2007	Ambedkar Stadium, New Delhi, India	Syria	2–3	2–3	2007 Nehru Cup

== Honours ==
India

- AFC Challenge Cup: 2008
- SAFF Championship: 2005
- Nehru Cup: 2007
- Afro-Asian Games silver medal: 2003

India U23

- LG Cup: 2002

Sporting positions
Preceded by None	Chirag United Club Kerala captain 2011–	Succeeded by Incumbent
