= Krishnagiri, Kurnool district =

Krishnagiri
- Village
- Interactive map of Krishnagiri
- Location in Andhra Pradesh, India Krishnagiri (India)
- Coordinates: 15°33′20″N 77°49′53″E
- Country: India
- State: Andhra Pradesh
- District: Kurnool
- Talukas: Krishnagiri

Languages
  - Official: Telugu
- Time zone: UTC+5:30 (IST)

Krishnagiri is a village in Krishnagiri mandal, located in Kurnool district of the Indian state of Andhra Pradesh.
