= Krishnagiri Village =

- Village
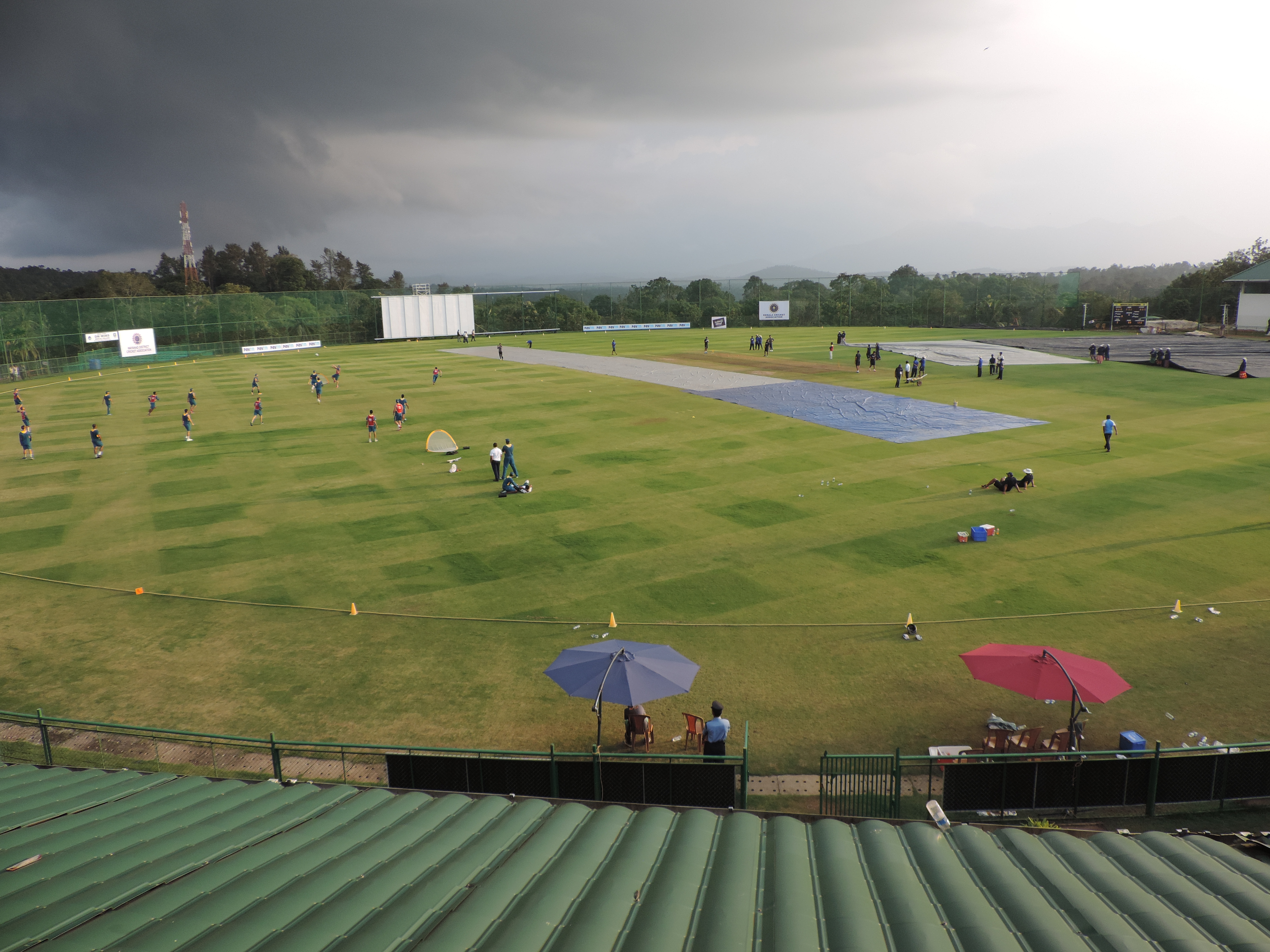
- Cricket Stadium in Krishnagiri
- Interactive map of Krishnagiri Village
- Coordinates: 11.662462°N 76.190278°E
- Country: India
- State: Kerala
- District: Wayanad

Languages
  - Official: Malayalam, English
- Time zone: UTC+5:30 (IST)
- PIN: 673591
- Telephone code: 04936
- ISO 3166 code: IN-KL
- Vehicle registration: KL-73
- Lok Sabha constituency: Wayanad
- Vidhan Sabha constituency: Sulthan Bathery

Krishnagiri is a village in the Wayanad District of Kerala, India. It is in a rural area of Wayanad and one of the 15 villages in Sultan Bathery Tehsil. It is located approximately 16 km (9.9 mi) from Kalpetta and 9 km (5.6 mi) from Sultan Bathery on NH766.

== Demographics ==
According to the census 2011, Krishnagiri village had a population of 12952. 6489 male and 6463 female. Total family residing in village is 3229. As per census, there are 1212 children in 2011.

== Location ==
Krishnagiri village is 16 km (9.9 mi) north-west of district headquarters Kalpetta and 9 km (5.6 mi) from Sultan Bathery. NH766 is the major road passing through Krishnagiri village and it has a very good connectivity with south Indian states. The NH 766 connecting it to Mysore, Bangalore and Kozhikode. One state highway connected to Ooty and Coimbatore from Sulthan Bathery. The Periya ghat road connects Mananthavady to Kannur and Thalassery. The Kuttiady mountain road connects Vatakara with Kalpetta and Mananthavady.

Nearest Railway Station is Kozhikode railway station, situated 90 km (56 mi) away. Nearest airports are Calicut International Airport, which is 103 km (64 mi), Kannur International Airport 98 km (61 mi) and Bangalore International Airport 311 km (193 mi) away.

== Cricket stadium ==
Krishnagiri Cricket Stadium, one of the unique high altitude cricket stadium in India is in Krishnagiri at an altitude of 2,100 ft (640 m) above sea level. The stadium is South India's first high altitude 'table top' stadium. It is owned by Kerala Cricket Association and about 20,000 people can be accommodated in this stadium. It has a scientifically constructed drainage system, which can drain out rain water very quickly in case of rain and match can be resumed in 20 minutes after rain. On 18 August 2015, it hosted an international test cricket match between 'A' teams of India and South Africa, which was the first international cricket match conducted in this stadium. Also some of the Ranji Trophy tournaments conducted in this ground.
