= Jimmy George Indoor Stadium =

Sports complex in Thiruvananthapuram, India

Coordinates: 8.4875°N 76.9525°E

Jimmy George Sports Hub
- Interactive map of Jimmy George Sports Hub
- Location: Thiruvananthapuram, Kerala, India
- Owner: Directorate of Sports & Youth Affairs, Government of Kerala
- Operator: Directorate of Sports & Youth Affairs, Government of Kerala
- Capacity: 2,000

Construction
- Opened: 1987

The Jimmy George Sports Hub, formerly known as the Jimmy George Indoor Stadium, is a sports complex in Vellayambalam, Thiruvananthapuram, Kerala, India, owned by Directorate of Sports and Youth Affairs, Government of Kerala and is named after Indian volleyball legend Jimmy George.

The complex includes an indoor stadium with facilities for playing volleyball, basketball, handball, badminton and table tennis, a swimming pool, one of the largest gymnasiums in the state and Astra, a state-of-the-art high altitude training centre, which enables high altitude acclimatisation. Promising badminton players undergo regular practice in this stadium under a coach from Sports Authority of India. Training in gymnastics and taekwondo are also conducted.

The complex also houses a photo gallery which chronicles the life of Jimmy George from his childhood, his triumphs with the Indian national volleyball team and his stint and untimely death in Italy, displayed along with the iconic ‘Number 10’ jersey he donned for Team India.
