= Krishnagiri block =

Revenue block in Tamil Nadu, India

Coordinates: 12.53°N 78.23°E

The Krishnagiri block is a revenue block in the Krishnagiri district of Tamil Nadu, India. It has a total of 30 panchayat villages.
