= Muhammed Sagar Ali =

Indian footballer (born 1993)

Personal information
- Full name: Muhammed Sagar Ali
- Date of birth: 13 April 1993 (age 33)
- Place of birth: Kothamangalam, Kerala, India
- Height: 1.82 m (6 ft 0 in)
- Position: Centre-back

Team information
- Current team: FC Takin
- Number: 3

Youth career
- Sports Authority of India

Senior career*
Years	Team	Apps	(Gls)
2015–2016	Air India FC	22	(0)
2016–2017	Delhi United FC	13	(0)
2017–2018	Madhya Bharat SC	7	(0)
2018–2019	ARA FC	0	(0)
2019–2020	Druk Stars FC	16	(0)
2020–2022	ARA FC	9	(0)
2022–	FC Takin	0	(0)
- * Club domestic league appearances and goals

Muhammed Sagar Ali (born 13 April 1993) is an Indian professional footballer who plays as a centre-back. He is currently co-owner of Kerala Premier League club Inter Kerala FC

== Playing career ==
Sagar Ali began his youth career when he was a ninth standard student. He attended the sub-junior state football championship for Idukki in 2007. He spent majority of his youth career at Sports Authority of India, Kollam. Sagar Ali started his professional career by playing for Air India FC 2015. A year later, Sagar Ali signed with Delhi United FC. His next stint was with Madhya Bharat FC where he played for the club in the I League second division.

In 2018 he was signed by United SC to represent them in the Calcutta Football League. Later he signed with ARA FC and played in the 2018–19 I league second division. In 2019, Sagar Ali signed a short-term contract with the Bhutan Premier League club Druk Stars FC. In 2020, he returned to ARA FC after his contract expired with the Bhutanese club. He played for the ARA FC in the I league qualifiers. During this time he was spotted by Gujarat and received an invitation to represent them in the 2021–22 Santosh Trophy. He was appointed as the team's captain and helped the side to qualify for the final round of the Santosh Trophy for the first time in 37 years. In 2022, Sagar Ali made his second move to Bhutan. He signed a one-year contract with FC Takin, the new entrants in the Bhutan Super League.

== Career statistics ==
As of 22 August 2020

Club	Season	League			Cup		Continental		Total	
Club	Season	Division	Apps	Goals	Apps	Goals	Apps	Goals	Apps	Goals
Air India F.C.	2015–2016	MDFA Elite Division	22	0	0	0	0	0	22	0
Delhi United FC	2016-2017	I-League 2nd Division	13	0	0	0	0	0	13	0
Madhya Bharat SC	2017-2018	I-League 2nd Division	7	0	0	0	0	0	7	0
ARA FC	2018-2019	I-League 2nd Division	9	0	0	0	0	0	9	0
Druk Stars FC	2019	Bhutan Super League	16	0	0	0	0	0	16	0
ARA FC	2020-2022	I-League 2nd Division	1	0	0	0	0	0	1	0
Total			93	0	0	0	0	0	93	0

== See also ==
- List of Indian expatriate footballers
