= N.I. David Memorial Trophy =

N. I. David Memorial Trophy is an annual inter-club football tournament held at Thrissur Municipal Corporation Stadium, Thrissur. The football championship was started in 1996 by the then superintendent of police in memory of N. I. David. Thrissur District Police and Thrissur Municipal Corporation jointly hold this tournament.
