= Krishnagiri Stadium =

Cricket stadium in Wayanad, India

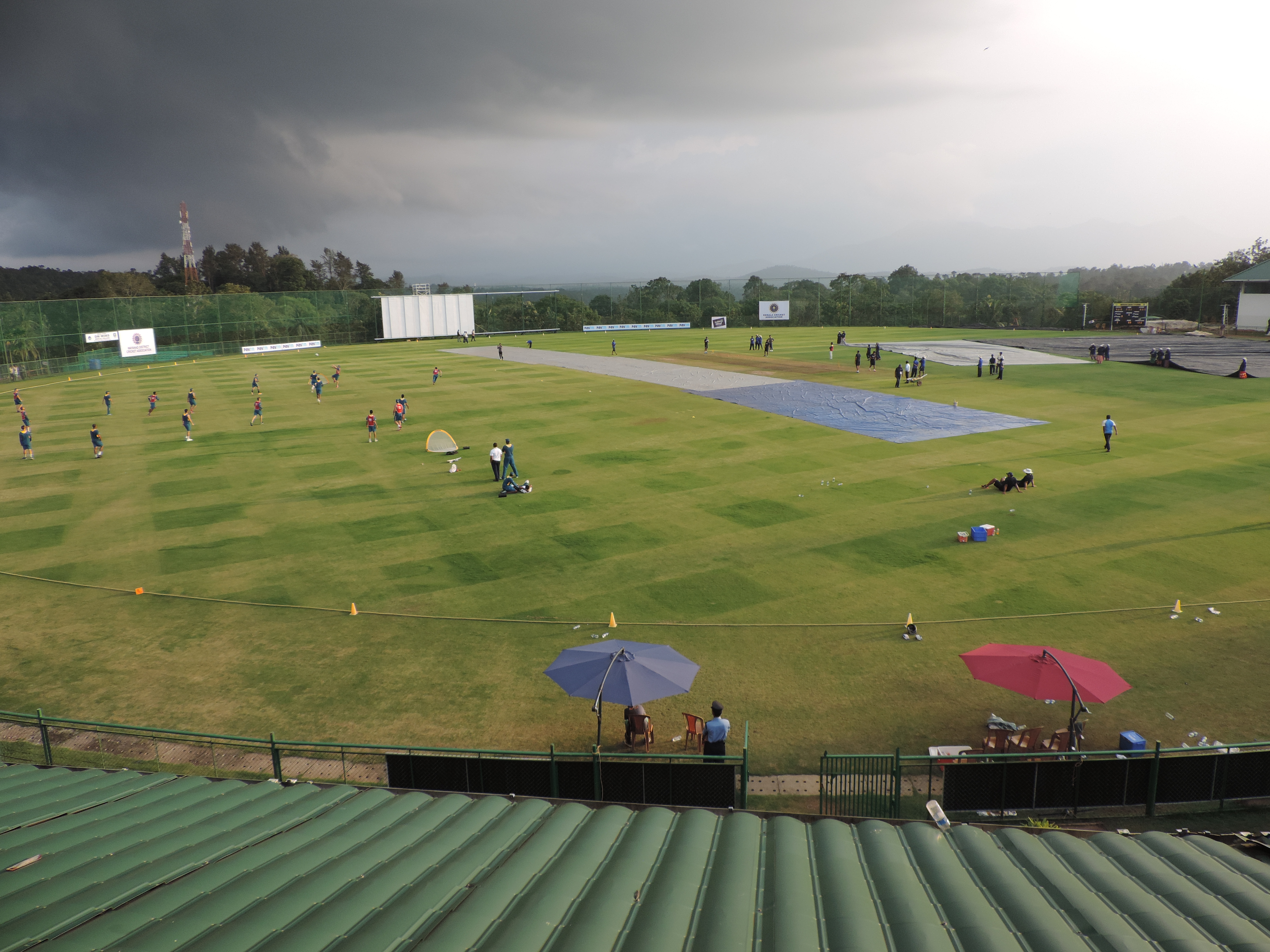
- Krishnagiri Stadium
- Interactive map of Krishnagiri Stadium
- Location: Krishnagiri, Wayanad, Kerala, India
- Coordinates: 11.664389°N 76.190197°E
- Owner: Kerala Cricket Association
- Capacity: 20,000
- Surface: Grass (oval)

Construction
- Opened: November 2013, 15; 12 years ago
- Cost: ₹5 crore (US$520,000)

Krishnagiri Stadium is a cricket stadium in Wayanad, Kerala. The stadium is located in Krishnagiri Village in the Indian state of Kerala. It holds up to 20,000 people, and at 2,100 feet above sea level, it is the highest-altitude stadium used exclusively for cricket.

== History ==
The stadium site was purchased in 2006, and the foundation stone was laid in 2009 by former Indian cricket players Robin Singh and Sunil Joshi. It was dedicated by Governor Nikhil Kumar at Krishnagiri in Wayanad in 2013. The stadium has hosted four first-class matches, including two between India A and South Africa.

== Features ==
- 11.5 acres
- Two-foot slanted height accelerates drainage
- Grass viewing mound and a viewing gallery in the form of a sloped lawn for seating.
- Main coaching center for cricket in the state (Kerala).
