= SBI Kerala (football team) =

Indian association football club

- Full name: State Bank of India Kerala Football Team
- Nicknames: SBT; SBI Kerala
- Founded: 1986; 40 years ago (as SBT Thiruvananthapuram); 2017; 9 years ago (as SBI Kerala Football Team)
- Dissolved: 2017
- Ground: University Stadium, Thiruvananthapuram
- Capacity: 20,000
- League: Kerala Premier League
- 2016–17: Group stage, 4th

SBI Kerala Football Team (known as SBT Thiruvananthapuram FC until 2017) was a professional football club based in Thiruvananthapuram, Kerala that represented and was owned by the State Bank of Travancore (SBT). It last competed in the Kerala Premier League. The club until its seizure was most successful in the Kerala Premier League history, winning the title record six times and finishing as runners-up on 5 occasions. The club has also won the National Football League Second Division twice, and became the first club from the city of Thiruvananthapuram to play in the top division of Indian football.

== History ==
During the mid-1980s, already established as a premier bank in the state of Kerala and the considering the popularity and passion towards the game of football at the region, State Bank of Travancore decided to launch a team of its own and register it with Kerala Football Association in November 1986. The debut of the team was in 1987 in the Trivandrum District 'E' Division League, the 5th division league of the region. The team steadily progressed further and went on to reach the 'B' Division to win the trophy in 1992, thus entering the 'A' Division League, the Tier-1 league of the region in 1993–94.

== Growth ==
At that point, the bank stepped in again by recruiting sportsmen under a special sports quota, pioneering a new trend among the government-controlled Public Sector Undertakings. This received a further impetus when N. M. Najeeb, a prominent national player at that time, agreed to coach the team. The club then evolved from a group of amateur players and went on to win various trophies. It also qualified and participated in many national level tournaments like Durand Cup, IFA Shield, Rover's Cup, Scissors Cup, Kalinga Cup and the Federation Cup.

== Entry to National Football League ==
Being the state champions in the 1996, SBT was eligible to play in the newly formed National Football League introduced by the All India Football Federation that year, but the emergence of the first professional football club from the state FC Cochin denied its opportunity. However, SBT was given an entry to the 2nd Division NFL, introduced in 1997–98 as a qualifying round for the top division. The team, though a hot favorite with the likes of National players Jiju Jacob, V. P. Shaji, Feroz Sheriff, A. Sunil Kumar and K. V. Dhanesh, could not qualify as it ended runner-up with a draw against Sesa Sports Club in the final game of the season.

The next season (1998–99) was the highpoint in SBT's history as it emerged the champions in the 2nd Division NFL, being the only institutional team till date to win the same. It also got promoted to the National Football League, but the glory did not last long as the team performed poorly and again got relegated to the second division.

It once again qualified for the National Football League in 2004–05 but after that, there were hardly any notable achievement for the club at the national level.

== Last developments ==
Pursuant to the directions of AIFF, SBT formed a junior team. It entered the 'E' Division of Trivandrum District League in 2007 and in less than a decade, it has reached the Super Division, giving SBT the distinction of fielding two teams, first in the history of Trivandrum League.

The future of the club was in threat after the merger between the State Bank of India with State Bank of Travancore in April 2017, but the new management decided to continue with the football team and the club took part in 2016–17 Kerala Premier League with a new name SBI Kerala.

== Honours ==
- National Football League II
  - Champions (2): 1998–99, 2004
- Kerala Premier League /Kerala Football League
  - Champions (6): 2000–01, 2003–04, 2006–07, 2007-2008, 2014–15, 2015–16
  - Runners-up (5): 1998–99, 1999–2000, 2004—05, 2005–06 2013–14
- Kerala State Club Football Championship
  - Champions (6): 1996, 2002, 2008, 2013, 2015, 2017
  - Runners-up (3): 1997, 2006, 2011
- G.V. Raja Football Tournament
  - Runner-up (1): 2010
- Mammen Mappillai Trophy – 1996
- Arlem Cup
- Kerala Kaumudi Trophy
- JC Jacob Trophy
- T'puram Mayor's Cup: 2019

== See also ==
- Football in Kerala
- List of football clubs in India
- Indian Bank Recreational Club
