= Josco FC =

Former Indian association football club

Josco FC ജോസ്കോ എഫ് സി
- Full name: Josco Football Club
- Nickname: The Lions
- Founded: 2007; 18 years ago
- Ground: Maharaja College Stadium
- Capacity: 30,000
Home colours	Away colours

Josco Football Club was an Indian professional football club based in Ernakulam, Kerala. The club was founded in 2007 and previously they have completed in the I-League 2nd Division, then second tier of Indian football, alongside the Kerala Premier League.

== History ==
Josco Football Club was formed in 2007 by the owner of business conglomerate Josco Group, Tony Jose. Team was led into Ernakulam Second Division with the then coach and later assistant, T. G. Purushothaman; TK Chathunny joined the club as coach in late 2008.

Josco FC took part in 2011 I-League 2nd Division in 2010 and narrowly missed out on promotion owing to inexperience at this level. The club then skipped out of next season in the 2012 I-League 2nd Division.

== Honours ==
- Kolhapur All-India Football Championship
  - Runners-up (1): 2009
- Kerala State Club Football Championship
  - Champions (1): 2010
