= Travancore Titanium Products =

Largest Titanium producing factory in India

Travancore Titanium Products Limited
- Type: Public (PSE)
- Industry: Chemical components
- Founded: 18 December 1946, Thiruvananthapuram
- Headquarters: Thiruvananthapuram, Kerala, India
- Products: Titanium Dioxide
- Number of employees: 550
- Website: www.travancoretitanium.com

Travancore Titanium Products Ltd (TTP) is the leading manufacturer of anatase grade titanium dioxide in India. The company was incorporated in 1946 at Thiruvananthapuram, the capital of Kerala, India on the initiative the then Travancore King, Sree Chithira Thirunal.

The main product is pigment grade titanium dioxide which is extracted from ilmenite, which is abundantly available as placer deposits on beaches near Kollam, 65 km north of Thiruvananthapuram. Ilmenite, a mixture of titanium dioxide and iron in the form of ferric/ferrous oxide, is treated with Sulphuric Acid to get Titanium dioxide and ferrous sulphate.

The company was promoted by His Highness Chithira Tirunal Balaramavarma Maharaja, the then ruler of the State of Travancore (now Kerala State in India) with the technical collaboration of British Titan Products. Though the company was registered in 1946, actual production was started only in 1952 with a small capacity of 5 t.p.a. Later subsequent expansions were made in 1962 and 1973 and now TTP can produce about 20000 tonnes of titanium dioxide per annum.

In 1960 Government of Kerala took over the management of the Company. Now the administrative control is vested with the Department of Industries, Government of Kerala.

The company also possesses a modern sulphuric acid plant which was commissioned in 1996, for utilizing the tail gas recycling DCDA (Double Catalysis Double Absorption) technology. An alkali scrubbing system is incorporated in the plant, and this in turn helps to keep sulphur dioxide emissions from the factory well within permissible limits.

For about 50 years, TTP was one of the profit making Public Sector Undertaking of Government of Kerala. Every year company declares a dividend of around 20 per cent. TTP is contributing crores of rupees to the State exchequer by way of Sales Tax, other duties and levies. Welfare amenities, salary and perquisites, working environment etc. are comparatively satisfactory. TTP has a good library with around 25000 books in stock.

TTP has a strength of around 1300 employees now. Titanium also offers summer internships for engineering students to study and improve the functioning of the organisation.

== Football club ==
Titanium FC ടൈടാനിയം എഫ്.സി.
- Full name: Travancore Titanium Football Club
- Founded: 1973
- Dissolved: 2015
- League: Kerala Premier League
- 2015: Group Stage

During the 1970s, Titanium Football team Football Clubs in Kerala, won multiple trophies. Players like B. Sasikumaran Pillai, Sankarankutty, Abdul Hameed, Najumuddin, Thomas Sebastian, Abdul Rasheed Kariyambath, V. Jayakumar, Ebin Rose, Shahjahan, Shaukath, Martin, Shabeer & Usman were members of Titanium Football team during these years.

=== Honors ===
- Kerala Football League

(silver) Runners-up (1): 2000–01

- Kerala State Club Football Championship

(gold) Champions (10): 1973, 1978, 1989, 1990, 1992, 1993, 1994, 2000, 2004, 2005
(silver) Runners-up (8): 1976, 1984, 1985, 1986, 1988, 1995, 2002, 2008

- Sait Nagjee Football Tournament

(silver) Runners-up (3): 1973, 1978, 1992

- Tirur All-India Football Tournament
  - Runners-up (1): 2006

== Volleyball team ==
In 1980 Titanium Volleyball Team was formed with national and international players like Cyril C. Velloor, K Udayakumar, Abdul Razak, N.C.Chacko, P.S.Mohammed Ali, Sebastian George etc. Subsequently, Danikutty David, Binu Jose, Tomy and others joined the team. The volleyball team won the Federation Cup in 1993.
