= Othukkungal =

- Census town
- Location in Kerala, India
- Coordinates: 11°1′30″N 76°1′35″E
- Country: India
- State: Kerala
- District: Malappuram

Population (2011)
  - Total: 39,139

Languages
  - Official: Malayalam, English
- Time zone: UTC+5:30 (IST)
- PIN: 676528
- Vehicle registration: KL-65
- Lok Sabha constituency: Malappuram
- Vidhan Sabha constituency: Vengara

Othukkungal is an outgrowth of Malappuram city in Kerala, India, located just 5 km from the town. It is part of the proposed Malappuram Municipal Corporation.

== Demographics ==
As of 2011 India census, Othukkungal had a population of 39139 with 18595 males and 20544 females.
