= E. N. Sudhir =

Indian football player (1948–2022)

Personal information
- Date of birth: 1948
- Place of birth: Kozhikode
- Date of death: 3 July 2022 (aged 73–74)
- Position: Goalkeeper

Senior career*
Years	Team	Apps	(Gls)
1971–1974	Vasco		
1974–1976	Mahindra & Mahindra		

International career
1972–1974	India	9	(0)
- * Club domestic league appearances and goals

E.N. Sudhir (1948 – 3 July 2022), was an Indian international football player who played as a goalkeeper. He represented Goa at the Santosh Trophy and made his debut at the tournament in 1972.

== Career ==
Sudhir made his international debut against Indonesia in Rangoon (currently Yangon) in the Olympic qualifiers in 1972. He represented India in nine matches. Sudhir was a part of the Indian squad in the 1973 Merdeka Cup and the 1974 Asian Games. At the domestic level, he played for Kerala in the Santosh Trophy in 1969 and 1970. He later switched to Goa and represented them in 1971, 1972, and 1973. He also played for Maharashtra in 1975. At the club level, Sudhir played for several clubs, including Vasco Sports Club and Mahindra & Mahindra.

== Personal life and death ==
Sudhir suffered from gall bladder-related problems. He died on 3 July 2022.
