= Victor Manjila =

Indian footballer

Personal information
- Full name: Victor Manjila
- Date of birth: 12-5-1949
- Place of birth: Thrissur, Kerala, India
- Position: Goalkeeper

Youth career
- Calicut University 1969,1970,1971

Senior career*
| Years | Team | Apps | (Gls) |
| 1972-1982 | Premier Tyres | 43 | |
| 1971–1979 | Kerala | 17 | |

International career
| 1976,1977 | India | 4 | |
- * Club domestic league appearances and goals

Victor Manjila is a former Indian International football goalkeeper and coach from Thrissur, Kerala.

== Playing career ==
Manjila played for Calicut University during his college days in St.Thomas College, Thrissur. He started his professional career with the then popular Kerala based football club "Premier Tyres", Kalamassery where former Indian goalkeeper K. P. Sethumadhavan was his teammate. He represented Kerala, as the goalkeeper, in the Santosh Trophy in 1971, 73, 74, 75, 76, and 79. Kerala won the Santosh Trophy in 1973. Manjila was the captain of the Kerala team that played in 1975 Santosh Trophy. He represented India in the 1976 and 1977 President's Cup at South Korea and King's Cup at Bangkok.

After the retirement from the professional football Manjila became a football coach and trained Calicut University for several years. In 2005, he helped Calicut University to win the South Zone inter-university football title after a gap of nine years. He also coached the Kerala team for the Santosh Trophy National football championship. He is also training students of Peevees Group of Schools KSA.

== Honours ==
India

- King's Cup third place: 1977

Kerala

- Santosh Trophy: 1973–74
