= Kerala Football Association =

Association football governing body in Kerala

- Sport: Football
- Jurisdiction: Kerala
- Membership: 14 district associations
- Abbreviation: KFA
- Founded: 1948; 78 years ago (as Travancore-Cochin Football Association)
- Affiliation: All India Football Federation (AIFF)
- Headquarters: Kochi
- President: Navas Meeran

Official website
- keralafa.com

The Kerala Football Association (abbreviated Kerala FA), formerly the Travancore-Cochin Football Association, is one of the 36 Indian state football associations that are affiliated with the All India Football Federation (AIFF). It sends state teams for the Santosh Trophy and the Rajmata Jijabai Trophy.

== History ==
Football has been a passion of thousands of Malayalees for the last several decades—much before the state of Kerala was formed on 1 November 1956. Kerala Football Association was formed in 1948 to directly oversees the development of football in Kerala from grassroots to senior level.

Later the headquarters of KFA was moved to Kollam after P. Laxmanan Pillai was elected president and K. Thankappan honorary secretary. KFA saw a new breed of organizers taking over the reins in the 1970s with former mayor of Cochin A. K. Seshadri becoming its president.

=== 2021 privatization ===
On 9 October 2021, Kerala Football Association signed a twelve year long deal with Meeran Sports LLP and Scoreline Sports Pvt Ltd. The deal was inspired from masterplan prepared by Rob Baan, former technical director of AIFF. The consortium is responsible for getting investments worth around Rs 350 crore into the football ecosystem over the 12-year period. As per the agreement, consortium will form Kerala Super League, initially planned to further develop youth local players in senior transition.

== State teams ==
=== Men ===
- Kerala football team
- Kerala under-20 football team
- Kerala under-15 football team
- Kerala under-13 football team

=== Women ===
- Kerala women's football team
- Kerala women's under-19 football team
- Kerala women's under-17 football team

== Affiliated district associations ==
All 14 districts of Kerala are affiliated with the Kerala Football Association.

No.	Association	District	President
1	Alappuzha District Football Association	Alappuzha	
2	Ernakulam District Football Association	Ernakulam	
3	Idukki District Football Association	Idukki	
4	Kannur District Football Association	Kannur	
5	Kasaragod District Football Association	Kasaragod	
6	Kollam District Football Association	Kollam	
7	Kottayam District Football Association	Kottayam	
8	Kozhikode District Football Association	Kozhikode	
9	Malappuram District Football Association	Malappuram	
10	Palakkad District Football Association	Palakkad	
11	Pathanamthitta District Football Association	Pathanamthitta	
12	Thiruvananthapuram District Football Association	Thiruvananthapuram	
13	Thrissur District Football Association	Thrissur	
14	Wayanad District Football Association	Wayanad	

== Competitions ==
=== District level ===
==== Men's Senior ====
- Inter-District State Championship Senior Men
- Beach Soccer Inter-District State Championship Senior Men

==== Men's youth ====
- Inter-District State Championship Youth U20
- Inter-District State Championship Junior Boys
- Inter-District State Championship Sub-Junior Boys

==== Women's Senior ====
- Inter-District State Championship Senior Women

=== Club level ===
==== Men's Senior ====
- Kerala Premier League
- 2nd Division Kerala Premier League
- 2nd Division Kerala Premier League Qualifiers
- Kerala State Club Futsal Championship
- Super League Kerala (franchise)

==== Women's Senior ====
- Kerala Women's League

== Kerala Football League pyramid ==
Kerala Premier League
Tier	Division
I _{(Level 5 on Indian Men's football Pyramid)}	Kerala Premier League _{↑promote (I-League 3) ↓relegate}
II _{(Level 6 on Indian Men's football pyramid)}	Kerala Premier League Second Division _{↑promote}

== Evolution ==
Years		1948	1948–1952	1952–1970	1970–1998	1998–2007	2007–2013	2013–2015	2013–2016	2016–2017	2017–2021	2021–2023	2024–
Level		1948	1948–1952	1952–1970	1970–1998	1998–2007	2007–2013	2013–2015	2013–2016	2016–2017	2017–2021	2021–2023	2024–
Men's
State leagues	1	Formation of Kerala Football Association (KFA)	None			Kerala Football League	None	Kerala Premier League					Kerala Premier League
State leagues	1	Formation of Kerala Football Association (KFA)	None										Kerala Premier League Second Division
Tournament			None		Kerala State Club Football Championship						Discontinued		
Tournament			Senior Inter-District Men's Football Championship										
Tournament			None	Sait Nagjee Football Tournament						Not conducted			
Women's
State leagues	1		None					Kerala Women's League	None			Kerala Women's League	

== See also ==
- Football in Kerala
- Football in India
- Sevens Football Association
- Thiruvananthapuram District Football Association
- Malabar Premier League
- Kerala State Club Football Championship
