= Sevens football =

Variation of football played in India

Characteristics
- Team members: 7 per side
- Type: Sports
- Equipment: Ball
- Venue: Football pitch

Presence
- Country or region: South India (originally)
- Olympic: No
- Paralympic: No

Sevens football is a seven-a-side version of football played on a smaller football pitch. Sevens football is predominantly popular in Kerala, Malabar, and South India. The matches in sevens tournaments are often played to fully packed stadiums. Sevens tournaments have also attracted players from other parts of India, as well as international players. Matches are usually held from November to May. The Sevens Football Association (SFA) organizes around 50 tournaments across South India.

Several footballers, including India internationals I. M. Vijayan, Ashique Kuruniyan, VP Suhair, Mashoor Shereef, CK Vineeth, Zakeer Manuppa, Mohammed Rafi, Asif Kottayil and Anas Edathodika, credit their experience in sevens tournaments for helping them improve footballing skills and develop passion for the sport.

== In popular culture ==
- Sudani from Nigeria (2018)
- Sevenes (2011)

== See also ==
- Football in India
- Football in Kerala
- Indoor soccer
