= 2026–27 Gokulam Kerala F.C. season =

Indian football club season

Gokulam Kerala
2026–27 season
- Owner: Sree Gokulam Group
- Chairman President: Gokulam Gopalan; V. C. Praveen
- Head coach: Carlos Eduardo Parreira
- Stadium: EMS Stadium
- I-League: TBD
- Indian Super Cup: TBD
Home colours	Away colours
- All statistics correct as of 01 June 2026.

The 2026–27 season will be the Gokulam Kerala's tenth since its establishment in 2017 and their eighth in the I-League. The club is also participating in the Indian Super Cup.

== Current technical staff ==
Position	Name
Head coach	(Brazil) Carlos Eduardo Parreira
Assistant coach	(India) Renjith CM
Fitness and conditioning coach	(Brazil) Djair Miranda Garcia
Technical director	(India) Derrick Pereira
Goalkeeping coach	(India) Sandip Nandy
Team manager	Vacant

== First-team squad ==
Squad no.	Name	Nationality	Position(s)	Age	Previous club	Since	Apps	Goals	Assists
Goalkeepers
1	Jaspreet Singh	(India)	GK	23	(India) KAMS FC	2026	0	0	0
42	Shibinraj Kunniyil	(India)	GK	32	(India) Punjab	2018–19, 2022–23, 2024	61	0	0
	Ravi Kumar	(India)	GK	33	(India) Jamshedpur	2026	0	0	0
Defenders
3	Harpreet Singh	(India)	CB/RB	25	(India) Namdhari	2025	8	0	0
4	Mikel Kortazar	(Spain)	CB	27	(India) Diamond Harbour	2026	0	0	0
5	Naresh Singh Yendrembam	(India)	RB	28	(India) Diamond Harbour	2026	0	0	0
12	Laishram Johnson	(India)	RB/LB	21	(India) Sagolband United	2023	18	1	1
24	Tejas Praveen	(India)	CB	19		2026	0	0	0
27	Sachu Siby	(India)	LB	24	(India) Calicut	2026	9	0	0
33	Gursimrat Singh	(India)	CB	27	(India) Namdhari	2025	13	1	0
43	Soyal Joshy	(India)	RB	23	(India) Hyderabad	2025	7	0	0
72	Muhammed Rafi	(India)	CB	25	(India) SC Delhi	2026	0	0	0
	Sarthak Golui	(India)	CB	28	(India) Jamshedpur	2026	0	0	0
MidFielders
6	Shubham Dixit	(India)	DM	26	(Portugal) Melgacense	2026	0	0	0
7	Victor	(Brazil)	AM	31	(Kosovo) Drenica	2026	0	0	0
8	João Rodrigues	(Portugal)	CM	24	(Cambodia) ISI Dangkor Senchey	2026	0	0	0
10	Hugo Díaz	(Spain)	AM	29	(India) Diamond Harbour	2026	0	0	0
11	R Lalbiakliana	(India)	AM	22	(India) Sreenidi Deccan	2026	0	0	0
18	Ayush Adhikari	(India)	CM	26	(India) SC Delhi	2026	0	0	0
31	Shigil Nambrath	(India)	CM	22	(India) NorthEast United	2025	12	0	0
	Ashis Pradhan	(India)	CM	26	(India) Punjab	2026-	1	0	0
	Lalramsanga Tlaichhun	(India)	CM	25	(India) East Bengal	2026	0	0	0
	Gyamar Nikum	(India)	CM	21	(India) Mumbai City	2026	0	0	0
Forwards
13	Denny Antwi	(Ghana)	CF	33	(Iraq) Al-Hudood	2020-21, 2026	17	15	6
17	Lalchungnunga Chhangte	(India)	LW	25	(India) Sreenidi Deccan	2026	0	0	0
19	Makan Chothe	(India)	FW	26	(India) Mohammedan	2026	0	0	0
20	Crislan	(Brazil)	CF	34	(Thailand) Trat	2026	0	0	0
21	Seilenthang Lotjem	(India)	FW	22	(India) Mumbai City	2026	0	0	0
70	Komal Thatal	(India)	FW	25	(India) Chennaiyin	2025	2	0	0

== New contracts ==
Date	Position	No.	Player	Ref.

== Transfers and loans ==
=== Transfers in ===
Entry date	Position	Player	Previous club	Fee	Ref.
15 July 2026	LW	(India) Lalchungnunga Chhangte	(India) Sreenidi Deccan	Free Transfer	
09 August 2026	CF	(Brazil) Crislan	(Thailand) Trat	Free Transfer	
11 August 2026	DM	(India) Shubham Dixit	(Portugal) Melgacense	Free Transfer	
16 August 2026	MF	(India) R Lalbiakliana	(India) Sreenidi Deccan	Free Transfer	
18 August 2026	MF	(Portugal) João Rodrigues	(Cambodia) ISI Dangkor Senchey	Free Transfer	
30 August 2026	DF	(Spain) Mikel Kortazar	(India) Diamond Harbour	Free Transfer	
01 September 2026	CF	(Ghana) Denny Antwi	(Iraq) Al-Hudood	Free Transfer	
03 September 2026	DF	(India) Muhammed Rafi	(India) SC Delhi	Free Transfer	
05 September 2026	DF	(India) Naresh Singh Yendrembam	(India) Diamond Harbour	Free Transfer	
07 September 2026	CF	(India) Seilenthang Lotjem	(India) Mumbai City	Free Transfer	
08 September 2026	GK	(India) Jaspreet Singh	(India) KAMS FC	Free Transfer	
10 September 2026	FW	(India) Makan Chothe	(India) Mohammedan	Free Transfer	
14 September 2026	MF	(Spain) Hugo Díaz	(India) Diamond Harbour	Free Transfer	
15 September 2026	GK	(India) Ravi Kumar	(India) Jamshedpur	Free Transfer	
17 September 2026	MF	(Brazil) Victor	(Kosovo) Drenica	Free Transfer	
25 September 2026	DF	(India) Tejas Praveen		Free Transfer	
26 September 2026	MF	(India) Lalramsanga Tlaichhun	(India) East Bengal	Free Transfer	
28 September 2026	DF	(India) Sarthak Golui	(India) Jamshedpur	Free Transfer	
04 October 2026	MF	(India) Ayush Adhikari	(India) SC Delhi	Free Transfer	
06 October 2026	MF	(India) Gyamar Nikum	(India) Mumbai City	Free Transfer	

=== Transfers out ===
Exit date	Position	No.	Player	To club	Fee	Ref.
14 May 2026	CB	26	(Afghanistan) Amid Arezou	(Norway) Rundtom FK	Free Transfer	
01 June 2026	AM	77	(India) Naseeb Rahman	(India) East Bengal	Loan Return	
01 July 2026	DM	13	(Ivory Coast) Armand Bazié	(India) Samaleswari	Free Transfer	
01 July 2026	FW	18	(Nigeria) Benjamin Kuku	(Maldives) Maziya	Free Transfer	
01 July 2026	CB	15	(Cameroon) Aminou Bouba		Free Transfer	
01 July 2026	DM	7	(Uzbekistan) Mirjalol Kasimov		Free Transfer	
01 July 2026	AM	8	(Portugal) Vítor Barata		Free Transfer	
07 July 2026	AM	10	(Spain) Nili Perdomo	(Spain) CD Atlético Paso	Free Transfer	
24 July 2026	AM	62	(India) Aman CK	(India) Jamshedpur	Free Transfer	
24 July 2026	AM	55	(India) Samuel Kynshi	(India) Langsning	Free Transfer	
10 August 2026	CM	6	(India) Rishad PP	(India) Malappuram	Free Transfer	
24 August 2026	AM	22	(India) Moses Lalrinzuala	(India) Churchill Brothers	Free Transfer	
28 August 2026	AM	30	(India) Kingslee Fernandes	(India) Churchill Brothers	Free Transfer	
28 August 2026	AM	23	(India) Trijoy Savio Dias	(India) Churchill Brothers	Free Transfer	
05 September 2026	FW	17	(Lesotho) Thabiso Brown	(India) Real Kashmir	Free Transfer	
11 September 2026	CB	4	(India) Athul Unnikrishnan	(India) Dempo	Free Transfer	
12 September 2026	AM	20	(India) Rahul Raju	(India) Forca Kochi	Free Transfer	
13 September 2026	GK	23	(India) Kamaludheen Kasim	(India) Thrissur Magic	Free Transfer	
13 September 2026	GK	1	(India) Rakshit Dagar	Retired	Free Transfer	
13 September 2026	CB	14	(India) Lalbiakhlua Lianzela	(India) Churchill Brothers	Free Transfer	
13 September 2026	CB	5	(India) Nidhin Krishna	(India) Malappuram	Free Transfer	

== Pre-season ==
Gokulam Kerala confirmed their participation in the 2026 Sikkim Gold Cup during pre-season.

06 October 2026 Sikkim Gold Cup	Gokulam Kerala	4-1	Thunderbolt North United	Gangtok
14:30 IST	Lalchungnunga Chhangte 9'; Makan Chothe 44'; Denny Antwi 45+2'; Victor 70'		35'	Stadium: Paljor Stadium

09 October 2026 Sikkim Gold Cup	Sudeva Delhi	1-2	Gokulam Kerala	Gangtok
14:00 IST	66'	Report	Victor 60', 72'	Stadium: Paljor Stadium

13 October 2026 Sikkim Gold Cup	Gokulam Kerala	2-3	Sikkim Aakraman	Gangtok
17:00 IST				Stadium: Paljor Stadium

== Competitions ==
=== I-League ===
==== League table ====
Pos	Team	Pld	W	D	L	GF	GA	GD	Pts	Qualification
1	Gokulam Kerala	3	3	0	0	6	3	+3	9	Promotion to 2027-28 ISL
2	Shillong Lajong	3	2	1	0	4	2	+2	7	
3	Dempo	3	2	0	1	4	3	+1	6	
4	Chanmari	2	1	1	0	3	2	+1	4	
5	Bengaluru United	3	1	1	1	6	6	0	4	

Updated to match(es) played on 14 November 2026. Source: IFL
Rules for classification: 1) Points; 2) Head-to-head points; 3) Head-to-head goal difference; 4) Total goal difference; 5) Total number of goals scored; 6) drawing of lots
(Note: Head-to-head record is used only after all the matches between the teams in question have been played)

==== Matches ====
Note:

31 October 2026 1	Gokulam Kerala	3–2	Samaleswari	Kozhikode
18:30 IST

7 November 2026 2	Rajasthan United	0-1	Gokulam Kerala	Jaipur
16:00 IST		Report		Stadium: Vidyadhar Nagar Stadium

14 November 2026 3	Nagaland United	1-2	Gokulam Kerala	Chümoukedima
18:30 IST		Report		Stadium: Chümoukedima Football Stadium

20 November 2026 4	Mohammedan	v	Gokulam Kerala	Kolkata
18:30 IST				Stadium: Kishore Bharati Krirangan

30 November 2026 5	Sreenidi Deccan	v	Gokulam Kerala	Hyderabad
16:00 IST				Stadium: Deccan Arena

8 December 2026 6	Gokulam Kerala	v	Real Kashmir	Kozhikode
18:30 IST

15 December 2026 7	Chanmari	v	Gokulam Kerala	Aizawl
16:00 IST				Stadium: Rajiv Gandhi Stadium

19 December 2026 8	Gokulam Kerala	v	Shillong Lajong	Kozhikode
16:00 IST

3 January 2026 9	Bengaluru United	v	Gokulam Kerala	Bengaluru
18:30 IST				Stadium: Bangalore Football Stadium

9 January 2027 10	Dempo	v	Gokulam Kerala	Carambolim
16:00 IST				Stadium: Duler Stadium

21 January 2027 11	Gokulam Kerala	v	Bengaluru United	Kozhikode
16:00 IST

27 January 2027 12	Gokulam Kerala	v	Sreenidi Deccan	Kozhikode
18:30 IST

31 January 2027 13	Gokulam Kerala	v	Nagaland United	Kozhikode
18:30 IST

7 February 2027 14	Real Kashmir	v	Gokulam Kerala	Srinagar
16:00 IST				Stadium: TRC Turf Ground

14 February 2027 15	Gokulam Kerala	v	Chanmari	Kozhikode
18:30 IST

21 February 2027 16	Shillong Lajong	v	Gokulam Kerala	Shillong
16:00 IST				Stadium: SSA Stadium

28 February 2027 17	Gokulam Kerala	v	Rajasthan United	Kozhikode
18:30 IST

5 March 2027 18	Gokulam Kerala	v	Dempo	Kozhikode
16:00 IST

14 March 2027 19	Gokulam Kerala	v	Mohammedan	Kozhikode
16:00 IST

20 March 2027 20	Samaleswari	v	Gokulam Kerala	Sambalpur
18:30 IST				Stadium: Birsa Munda Athletic Stadium
