= 2025–26 Gokulam Kerala FC season =

Indian football club season

Gokulam Kerala
2025–26 season
- Owner: Sree Gokulam Group
- Chairman President: Gokulam Gopalan; V. C. Praveen
- Head coach: José Hevia (until 10 January); Derrick Pereira (from 11 January to 10 March); Dimitris Dimitriou (from 11 March to 20 June); Renjith CM (from 21 June)
- Stadium: EMS Stadium
- I-League: 9th
- Indian Super Cup: Group Stage
- IFA Shield: Group Stage
Home colours	Away colours
- All statistics correct as of 01 June 2025.

The 2025–26 season was the Gokulam Kerala's ninth since its establishment in 2017 and their eighth in the I-League. This is Gokulam Kerala's first season under new head coach José Hevia, it is announced on 6 June 2025. The club is also participating in the IFA Shield and Indian Super Cup.

departure of former coach Jose Hevia in January 2026, former Churchill Brothers manager Dimitris Dimitriou was announced as Malabrians manager that in march.

== Current technical staff ==
Position	Name
Head coach	(India) Renjith CM (Interim)
Assistant coach	(Bhutan) Yelan Wangda
Assistant coach	
Fitness and conditioning coach	(India) Saifulla
Technical director	(India) Derrick Pereira
Goalkeeping coach	(India) Fysal Bappu
Team manager	(India) Nikidesh

== First-team squad ==
Squad no.	Name	Nationality	Position(s)	Age	Previous club	Since	Apps	Goals	Assists
Goalkeepers
1	Rakshit Dagar	(India)	GK	32	(India) Inter Kashi	2021, 2025-	39	0	0
25	Kamaludheen Kasim	(India)	GK	23	(India) Thrissur Magic	2026	1	0	0
42	Shibinraj Kunniyil	(India)	GK	32	(India) Punjab	2018-19, 2022–23, 2024	61	0	0
Defenders
3	Harpreet Singh	(India)	CB/RB	25	(India) Namdhari	2025	8	0	0
4	Athul Unnikrishnan	(India)	RB	27	(India) East Bengal II	2024	28	2	0
5	Nidhin Krishna	(India)	CB/ RB	26	(India) Kerala United	2023	58	1	1
14	Lalbiakhlua Lianzela	(India)	CB	24	(India) Churchill Brothers	2026	5	0	1
15	Aminou Bouba	(Cameroon)	CB	33	Free Agent	2021-2024,2026-	81	6	3
26	Amid Arezou	(Afghanistan)	CB	29	(Norway) Arendal	2026	4	0	0
27	Sachu Siby	(India)	LB	24	(India) Calicut	2026	9	0	0
33	Gursimrat Singh	(India)	CB	27	(India) Namdhari	2025	13	1	0
43	Soyal Joshy	(India)	RB	23	(India) Hyderabad	2025	7	0	0
MidFielders
6	Rishad PP	(India)	CM	29	(India) GKFC Reserves	2021	69	3	4
7	Mirjalol Kasimov	(Uzbekistan)	DM	31	(India) Mohammedan	2026	9	2	1
8	Vítor Barata	(Portugal)	AM	30	(Indonesia) PSMS Medan	2026	4	0	1
10	Nili Perdomo	(Spain)	CM	31	Free Agent	2025,2026-	18	3	4
11	Ashis Pradhan	(India)	CM	26	(India) Punjab	2026-	1	0	0
13	Armand Bazié	(Ivory Coast)	CM	34	Free Agent	2026-	5	0	0
20	Rahul Raju	(India)	CM	21	(India) Bengaluru B	2022	50	5	1
23	Trijoy Savio Dias	(India)	CM	26	(India) Churchill Brothers	2025	13	2	1
30	Kingslee Fernandes	(India)	CM	28	(India) Churchill Brothers	2026	5	0	0
31	Shigil Nambrath	(India)	CM	22	(India) NorthEast United	2025	12	0	0
62	Aman CK	(India)	AM	22	(India) East Bengal	2026-	4	0	0
77	Naseeb Rahman	(India)	AM	22	(India) East Bengal	2026	0	0	0
Forwards
17	Thabiso Brown	(Lesotho)	FW	30	(Cambodia) Boeung Ket	2025	21	13	2
18	Benjamin Kuku	(Nigeria)	FW	31	Free Agent	2026	6	1	0
22	Moses Lalrinzuala	(India)	FW	21	(India) Chanmari	2025	16	2	2
55	Samuel Kynshi	(India)	WF	25	(India) Punjab	2025	8	1	0
70	Komal Thatal	(India)	FW	25	(India) Chennaiyin	2025	2	0	0
	Jangjagin kuki	(India)	FW	25	(India) 27 United FC	2025	0	0	0

== New contracts ==
Date	Position	No.	Player	Ref.
03 July 2025	GK	01	(India) Bishorjit Singh	
03 July 2025	GK	12	(India) Rakshit Dagar	
03 July 2025	GK	42	(India) Shibinraj Kunniyil	
16 September 2025	MF	99	(India) Rahul Raju	

== Transfers and loans ==
=== Transfers in ===
Entry date	Position	Player	Previous club	Fee	Ref.
1 June 2025	FW	(India) Senthamil Shanbagam	(India) SAT	Loan return	
20 June 2025	DF	(India) Soyal Joshy	(India) Hyderabad	None	
11 July 2025	DF	(India) Harpreet Singh	(India) Namdhari	None	
21 July 2025	MF	(India) Lalramdinsanga Ralte	(India) Real Kashmir	None	
30 July 2025	FW	(India) Moses Lalrinzuala	(India) Chanmari	None	
13 August 2025	FW	(India) Seiminmang Manchong	(India) Rajasthan United	None	
18 August 2025	MF	(India) Shighil Nambrath	(India) NorthEast United	None	
25 August 2025	MF	(India) Sibajit Singh	(India) Mohun Bagan B	None	
27 August 2025	FW	(India) Akshunna Tyagi	(India) Bengaluru United	None	
02 September 2025	DF	(India) Gursimrat Singh	(India) Namdhari	None	
09 September 2025	FW	(India) Jangjagin kuki	(India) 27 United FC	None	
11 September 2025	MF	(India) Samuel Kynshi	(India) Punjab	None	
24 September 2025	DF	(Spain) Matías Hernández	(Brunei) DPMM II	None	
25 September 2025	MF	(Spain) Edu Martínez	(Italy) Canosa	None	
26 September 2025	FW	(Spain) Juan Carlos Rico	(Spain) Rayo Ibense	None	
30 September 2025	MF	(Spain) Alfred Planas	(Spain) Sestao River	None	
16 October 2025	DF	(India) Thokchom Malemngamba Singh	(India) Bengaluru B	None	
21 October 2025	MF	(India) Craig Mangkhanlian	(India) Bhawanipore Club	None	
22 October 2025	MF	(India) Trijoy Savio Dias	(India) Churchill Brothers	None	
23 October 2025	MF	(Spain) Albert Torras	(Spain) Ejea	None	
24 October 2025	FW	(India) Kevisanyu Peseyie	(India) Barak	None	
18 November 2025	FW	(India) Komal Thatal	Free Agent	None	
4 December 2025	FW	(Lesotho) Thabiso Brown	(Cambodia) Boeung Ket	None	
07 January 2026	GK	(India) Kamaludheen Kasim	(India) Thrissur Magic	None	
30 January 2026	MF	(Spain) Nili Perdomo	Free Agent	None	
02 February 2026	FW	(Brazil) John Kennedy	(India) Malappuram FC	None	
04 February 2026	MF	(Uzbekistan) Mirjalol Kasimov	(India) Mohammedan	None	
05 February 2026	DF	(India) Wungngayam Muirang	(India) Diamond Harbour	None	
09 February 2026	DF	(India) Sachu Siby	(India) Calicut	None	
10 February 2026	DF	(Afghanistan) Amid Arezou	(Norway) Arendal	None	
18 February 2026	MF	(India) Ashis Pradhan	(India) Punjab	None	
22 February 2026	MF	(India) Aman C. K.	(India) East Bengal	None	
07 March 2026	MF	(India) Kingslee Fernandes	(India) Chennaiyin	None	
10 March 2026	FW	(India) Muhammed Sinan	(India) Kannur Warriors	None	
13 March 2026	DF	(India) Lalbiakhlua Lianzela	(India) Churchill Brothers	None	
30 March 2026	MF	(Ivory Coast) Armand Bazié		None	
30 March 2026	DF	(Cameroon) Aminou Bouba		None	
06 April 2026	FW	(Nigeria) Benjamin Kuku		None	
11 April 2026	MF	(Portugal) Vítor Barata	(Indonesia) PSMS Medan	None	

=== Transfers out ===
Exit date	Position	No.	Player	To club	Fee	Ref.
21 May 2025	DF	13	(India) Rahul khoukar	(India) Kalighat MS	Free Transfer	
1 June 2025	FW	70	(Brazil) Wander Luiz	(Thailand) Chanthaburi	Free Transfer	
1 June 2025	FW	23	(India) Michael Soosairaj	(India) Forca Kochi	Free Transfer	
1 June 2025	MF	77	(India) Saurav Mandal	(India) Kerala Blasters	Loan Return	
1 June 2025	FW	24	(India) Ranjeet Pandre	(India) Punjab	Loan Return	
1 June 2025	DF	22	(India) Halen Nongtdu	(India) Mumbai City	Loan Return	
2 June 2025	FW	11	(India) Tharpuia	(India) Diamond Harbour	Free Transfer	
25 June 2025	MF	7	(India) Abhijith Kurungodan	(India) Sreenidi Deccan	Free Transfer	
26 June 2025	MF	93	(India) Akhil Praveen	(India) Malappuram FC	Free Transfer	
03 July 2025	GK		(India) Avilash Paul	(India) United SC	Free Transfer	
12 July 2025	FW	21	(Lesotho) Thabiso Brown	(Cambodia) Boeung Ket	Free Transfer	
22 July 2025	FW	15	(India) VP Suhair	(India) Jamshedpur	Free Transfer	
12 July 2025	FW	17	(Spain) Nacho Abeledo	(Thailand) Chanthaburi	Free Transfer	
27 July 2025	DF	2	(India) Salam Ranjan Singh	(India) Real Kashmir	Free Transfer	
10 August 2025	FW	9	(Mali) Adama Niane	Free Agent	Free Transfer	
12 August 2025	FW	95	(Montenegro) Siniša Stanisavić	Free Agent	Free Transfer	
12 August 2025	MF	10	(Uruguay) Martín Cháves	Free Agent	Free Transfer	
12 August 2025	MF	28	(Spain) Sergio Llamas	(Italy) FBC Gravina	Free Transfer	
19 September 2025	FW		(India) Senthamil Shanbagam	(India) Thrissur Magic	Free Transfer	
19 September 2025	DF	30	(India) Bibin Ajayan	(India) Thrissur Magic	Free Transfer	
01 January 2026	FW	10	(Spain) Edu Martínez	(Spain) Gimnástica Segoviana	Free Transfer	
07 January 2026	FW	11	(Spain) Juan Carlos Rico	(Spain) Soneja	Free Transfer	
07 January 2026	DF	27	(India) Sebastian Thangmuansang	Free Agent	Free Transfer	
20 January 2026	AM	7	(Spain) Alfred Planas	(India) Inter Kashi	Free Transfer	
27 January 2026	DM	21	(Spain) Matías Hernández	(India) Kerala Blasters	Free Transfer	
03 February 2026	MF	16	(Spain) Albert Torras	(Kyrgyzstan) FC Bars Issyk-Kul	Free Transfer	
20 February 2026	DF	12	(India) Mashoor Shereef	(India) Real Kashmir	Free Transfer	
20 February 2026	MF		(India) Sibajit Singh	(India) Gokulam Kerala B	Free Transfer	
2 March 2026	GK	13	(India) Bishorjit Singh	(India) Calicut	Free Transfer	
2 March 2026	DF	14	(India) Malemngamba Singh	(India) Kerala Blasters	Free Transfer	
15 March 2026	MF	19	(India) Craig Mangkhanlian	(India) United	Free Transfer	
17 March 2026	FW	8	(India) Kevisanyu Peseyie	(India) Morning Star	Free Transfer	
24 March 2026	FW	70	(India) Seiminmang Manchong	(India) Sudeva Delhi	Free Transfer	
01 April 2026	FW	9	(India) Akshunna Tyagi	(India) Bengaluru United	Free Transfer	
01 April 2026	MF	17	(India) Lalramdinsanga Ralte	(India) Bengaluru United	Free Transfer	

=== Loan in ===
Start date	End date	Position	Player	From club	Fee	Ref
03 February 2026	End of Season	MF	Naseeb Rahman	East Bengal	None	

=== Loan out ===
Start date	End date	Position	Player	To club	Fee	Ref
1 March 2026	End of season	DF	Wungngayam Muirang	Gokulam Kerala B	None	
1 March 2026	End of season	DF	Laishram Singh Johnson	Gokulam Kerala B	None	
1 March 2026	End of season	MF	Emil Benny	Gokulam Kerala B	None	
1 March 2026	End of season	GK	Kamaludheen Kasim	Gokulam Kerala B	None	

== Pre-season ==
Gokulam Kerala announced their participation in the O Chandrasekharan Memorial Tournament Irinjalakuda, Thrissur during pre-season.

23 January 2026 O Chandrasekharan Memorial Tournament	Gokulam Kerala	4-1	NFC Kerala	Irinjalakuda
19:00 IST	Akshunna Tyagi; Kevisanyu Peseyie; Jamshid			Stadium: Municipal Stadium

24 January 2026 O Chandrasekharan Memorial Tournament	Gokulam Kerala	2-0	PFC Kerala	Irinjalakuda
18:30 IST	Rahul Raju; Mahdi			Stadium: Municipal Stadium

25 January 2026 O Chandrasekharan Memorial Tournament	Gokulam Kerala	2-1	Kerala Police	Irinjalakuda
19:00 IST				Stadium: Municipal Stadium

4 February 2026 Friendly	Kerala Blasters	1-0	Gokulam Kerala	Thripunithura
TBC IST	Amawia (TBC)	Report		Stadium: The Sanctuary; Attendance: TBC; Referee: TBC; Man of the Match: N/A

9 February 2026 Friendly	Kerala Blasters	3-1	Gokulam Kerala	Thripunithura
TBC IST	Victor Bertomeu (TBC); Rowllin Borges (TBC); Ebindas Yesudas (TBC)	Report	Kennedy (TBC)	Stadium: The Sanctuary; Attendance: TBC; Referee: TBC; Man of the Match: N/A

== Competitions ==
=== Overview ===
Competition	First match	Last match	Starting round	Final position	Record							
Competition	First match	Last match	Starting round	Final position	Pld	W	D	L	GF	GA	GD	Win %
I-League	27 February 2026	12 May 2026	Match Day 1	9th	12	3	3	6	14	23	−9	25.00
IFA Shield	9 October 2025	12 October 2025	Group Stage	Group Stage	2	0	0	2	1	6	−5	0.00
Indian Super Cup	27 October 2025	5 November 2025	Group Stage	Group Stage	3	1	0	2	3	7	−4	33.33
Total					17	4	3	10	18	36	−18	23.53

Last updated: 12 May 2026
Source: Competitions

=== I-League ===
==== League table ====
Pos	Team	Pld	W	D	L	GF	GA	GD	Pts	Qualification
6	Dempo	9	2	3	4	14	14	0	9 (Note: Head-to-head result: Dempo 3–0 Aizawl.)	Promotion round
7	Aizawl	9	2	3	4	13	22	−9	9	Relegation round
8	Real Kashmir	9	2	2	5	15	14	+1	8 (Note: Head-to-head result: Real Kashmir 6–2 Gokulam Kerala.)	Relegation round
9	Gokulam Kerala	9	2	2	5	11	18	−7	8	Relegation round
10	Namdhari	9	1	4	4	12	18	−6	7	Relegation round

Source: IFL
Rules for classification: 1) Points; 2) Head-to-head points; 3) Head-to-head goal difference; 4) Total goal difference; 5) Total number of goals scored; 6) drawing of lots
(Note: Head-to-head record is used only after all the matches between the teams in question have been played)
Notes:

Pos	Team	Pld	W	D	L	GF	GA	GD	Pts	Promotion
1	Diamond Harbour (C, P)	14	9	2	3	31	20	+11	29	Promotion to ISL
2	Shillong Lajong	14	8	4	2	28	12	+16	28	
3	Sreenidi Deccan	14	7	5	2	18	13	+5	26	
4	Rajasthan United	14	5	3	6	20	24	−4	18	
5	Chanmari	14	4	3	7	19	25	−6	15	
6	Dempo	14	3	6	5	17	18	−1	15	

Source: IFL
Rules for classification: 1) Points; 2) Head-to-head points; 3) Head-to-head goal difference; 4) Total goal difference; 5) Total number of goals scored; 6) drawing of lots
(Note: Head-to-head record is used only after all the matches between the teams in question have been played)
(C) Champions; (P) Promoted

Pos	Team	Pld	W	D	L	GF	GA	GD	Pts	Relegation
1	Real Kashmir	12	4	2	6	20	18	+2	14	
2	Aizawl	12	3	4	5	18	27	−9	13	
3	Gokulam Kerala	12	3	3	6	14	23	−9	12	
4	Namdhari (R)	12	2	4	6	16	21	−5	10	Relegation to IL2

Source: IFL
Rules for classification: 1) Points; 2) Head-to-head points; 3) Head-to-head goal difference; 4) Total goal difference; 5) Total number of goals scored; 6) drawing of lots
(Note: Head-to-head record is used only after all the matches between the teams in question have been played)
(R) Relegated

==== Results by round ====
Round	1	2	3	4	5	6	7	8	9
Ground	A	H	H	H	H	H	A	A	A
Result	D	D	L	W	L	W	L	L	L
Position	9	7	10	7	7	5	6	8	9
Points	1	2	2	5	5	8	8	8	8

Updated to match(es) played on 18 April 2026. Source:
A = Away; H = Home; W = Win; D = Draw; L = Loss

==== Matches ====
Note:

27 February 2026 1	Chanmari	0-0	Gokulam Kerala	Aizawl
18:30 IST				Stadium: Rajiv Gandhi Stadium

7 March 2026 2	Gokulam Kerala	1-1	Namdhari	Manjeri
16:00 IST	Thabiso Brown 33'		Seilenthang Lotjem 75'

14 March 2026 3	Gokulam Kerala	0-1	Sreenidi Deccan	Manjeri
16:00 IST

20 March 2026 4	Gokulam Kerala	2-0	Dempo	Manjeri
18:30 IST	Lalrinzuala 19'; Kasimov 84' (pen.)			Referee: I Jamal muhammed

26 March 2026 5	Gokulam Kerala	0-2	Shillong Lajong	Manjeri
18:30 IST

31 March 2026 6	Gokulam Kerala	4-2	Aizawl	Manjeri
18:30 IST	Rahul 2', 90+8'; Trijoy 5'; Thabiso 34'		Tlangte 88'; Zomuansanga 89'

7 April 2026 7	Rajasthan United	1-0	Gokulam Kerala	Jaipur
16:00 IST				Stadium: Vidhyadhar Nagar Stadium

12 April 2026 8	Real Kashmir	6-2	Gokulam Kerala	Srinagar
16:00 IST			M.Lalrinzuala 13'; B.Kuku 80'	Stadium: TRC Turf Ground

18 April 2026 9	Diamond Harbour	5-2	Gokulam Kerala	Diamond Harbour
16:00 IST				Stadium: Naihati Stadium

==== Relegation Stage ====
30 April 2026 1	Real Kashmir	3-0	Gokulam Kerala	Hyderabad
18:300 IST

5 May 2026 2	Gokulam Kerala	2-2	Aizawl	Hyderabad
18:30 IST	Kasimov 17'; Gursimrat Singh 43'

May 2026 3	Namdhari	0-1	Gokulam Kerala	Hyderabad
18:30 IST			Trijoy 90+6'

=== Group B ===
Pos	Team	Pld	W	D	L	GF	GA	GD	Pts	Qualification	MBG	USC	GOK
1	Mohun Bagan	2	2	0	0	7	1	+6	6	Advance to the Final		2–0	5–1
2	United SC	2	1	0	1	1	2	−1	3				1–0
3	Gokulam Kerala	2	0	0	2	1	6	−5	0				

Source: IFA
Rules for classification: Group stage tiebreakers

==== Matches ====
9 October 2025	Mohun Bagan	5–1	Gokulam Kerala	Kolkata
15:00 IST	Emil Benny (yellow card) 24'; Athul Unnikrishnan (yellow card) 35'; Lalengmawia Ralte 48' (o.g.)	I-League	Rishad 11' (o.g.); Subhasish Bose (yellow card) 23'; Jamie Maclaren 27', 75'; Alberto Rodríguez 51'; Robson Robinho 54'; Lalengmawia Ralte (yellow card) 71'	Stadium: Kishore Bharati Krirangan; Attendance: 1400; Referee: Surojit Das; Man of the Match: Jamie Maclaren (Mohun Bagan)

12 October 2025	United SC	1–0	Gokulam Kerala	Kalyani
14:30 IST	Amit Basak 54'	AIFF; I-League; PDF Report		Stadium: Kalyani Stadium; Attendance: 768; Referee: Pratik Mondal; Man of the Match: Amit Basak (United SC)

=== Super Cup ===
Gokulam Kerala entered the competition in the Group Stage, the fixtures were announced on 25 September 2025.

Pos	Team	Pld	W	D	L	GF	GA	GD	Pts	Qualification	PFC	BFC	GOK	MDS
1	Punjab	3	2	1	0	6	0	+6	7 (Note: Punjab qualified after winning the penalty shoot-out.)	Advance to knockout stage		0–0	3–0	3–0
2	Bengaluru	3	2	1	0	6	0	+6	7				4–0	2–0
3	Gokulam Kerala	3	1	0	2	3	7	−4	3					3–0
4	Mohammedan	3	0	0	3	0	8	−8	0					

Source: AIFF
Rules for classification: 1) points; 2) head-to-head points; 3) head-to-head goal difference; 4) goal difference; 5) number of goals scored; 6) Penalty shoot-out if only two teams are tied and they met in the last round of the group; 7) Disciplinary points; 8) drawing of lots

==== Matches ====
27 October 2025 1	Punjab	3–0	Gokulam Kerala	Bambolim
19:30 IST	Suhail 2'; Prabhu 10'; Princeton 43'	I-League; PDF Report		Stadium: GMC Athletic Stadium; Attendance: 189; Referee: K Ramdasan

2 November 2025 2	Gokulam Kerala	0–4	Bengaluru	Fatorda
16:30 IST		I-League; PDF Report	Williams 7', 47'; Vinith 44'; Chhetri 62'	Stadium: Fatorda Stadium; Attendance: 350; Referee: Aditya Purkayastha; Man of the Match: Ryan Williams (Bengaluru)

5 November 2025 3	Gokulam Kerala	3–0	Mohammedan	Bambolim
16:30 IST	Torras 28'; Kynshi 56'; Azorin 86'	I-League; PDF Report		Stadium: GMC Athletic Stadium; Attendance: 100; Referee: Crystal John

== Statistics ==
=== Appearances ===
Players with no appearances are not included on the list.

As of 12 May 2026

No.	Pos.	Nat.	Name	I-League		IFA Shield		Indian Super Cup		Total	
No.	Pos.	Nat.	Name	Apps	Starts	Apps	Starts	Apps	Starts	Apps	Starts
1	GK	(India)	Rakshit Dagar	3	2	1	1	2	1	6	4
3	DF	(India)	Harpreet Singh	5	4	1	1	3	3	9	8
4	DF	(India)	Athul Unnikrishnan	6	3	1	1	0	0	7	4
5	DF	(India)	Nidhin Krishna	10	9	2	2	1	1	13	12
6	MF	(India)	Rishad PP	4	0	2	2	3	2	9	4
~~7~~	MF	(Spain)	Alfred Planas	0	0	2	2	3	3	5	5
7	MF	(Uzbekistan)	Mirjalol Kasimov	10	8	0	0	0	0	10	8
8	MF	(Portugal)	Vítor Barata	4	2	0	0	0	0	4	2
~~9~~	FW	(India)	Akshunna Tyagi	0	0	2	0	2	1	4	1
~~10~~	FW	(Spain)	Edu Martínez	0	0	2	2	1	1	3	3
~~10~~	FW	(Spain)	Nili	3	3	0	0	0	0	3	3
~~11~~	FW	(Spain)	Juan Carlos Rico	0	0	2	2	3	1	5	3
11	MF	(India)	Ashis Pradhan	1	0	0	0	0	0	1	0
~~12~~	DF	(India)	Mashoor Shereef	0	0	1	0	0	0	1	0
13	MF	(Ivory Coast)	Armand Bazié	5	4	0	0	0	0	5	4
~~15~~	MF	(India)	Emil Benny	0	0	2	1	3	1	5	2
15	DF	(Cameroon)	Aminou Bouba	6	5	0	0	0	0	6	5
~~16~~	MF	(Spain)	Albert Torras	0	0	0	0	3	3	3	3
~~17~~	MF	(India)	Lalramdinsanga Ralte	0	0	1	1	0	0	1	1
17	FW	(Lesotho)	Thabiso Brown	12	11	0	0	0	0	12	11
~~18~~	DF	(India)	Laishram Johnson Singh	0	0	1	1	2	1	3	2
18	FW	(Nigeria)	Benjamin Kuku	6	1	0	0	0	0	6	1
20	MF	(India)	Rahul Raju	11	9	1	0	3	3	15	12
~~21~~	MF	(Spain)	Matías Hernández	0	0	2	2	0	0	2	2
22	FW	(India)	Moses Lalrinzuala	11	9	2	0	3	0	16	9
23	MF	(India)	Trijoy Savio Dias	12	10	0	0	2	0	13	10
25	GK	(India)	Kamaludheen AK	1	0	0	0	0	0	1	0
26	DF	(Afghanistan)	Amid Arezou	5	5	0	0	0	0	5	5
27	DF	(India)	Sachu Siby	10	10	0	0	0	0	10	10
30	MF	(India)	Kingslee Fernandes	6	4	0	0	0	0	6	4
31	MF	(India)	Shighil Nambrath	8	7	2	1	3	1	13	9
33	DF	(India)	Gursimrat Singh	8	8	2	2	3	3	13	13
42	GK	(India)	Shibinraj Kunniyil	10	10	1	1	2	2	13	13
43	MF	(India)	Soyal Joshy	3	1	1	0	3	3	7	4
55	FW	(India)	Samuel Kynshi	5	2	1	0	3	3	9	5
62	WF	(India)	Aman CK	4	1	0	0	0	0	4	1
70	MF	(India)	Komal Thatal	2	0	0	0	0	0	2	0
99	FW	(Brazil)	John Kennedy	3	2	0	0	0	0	3	2

=== Goal scorers ===
Rank	No.	Pos.	Nat.	Name	I League	IFA Shield	Super Cup	Total
1	20	MF	(India)	Rahul Raju	3	0	0	3
2	7	MF	(Uzbekistan)	Mirjalol Kasimov	2	0	0	2
2	17	FW	(Lesotho)	Thabiso Brown	2	0	0	2
2	22	WF	(India)	Moses Lalrinzuala	2	0	0	2
2	23	WF	(India)	Trijoy Savio Dias	2	0	0	2
5	~~11~~	FW	(Spain)	Juan Carlos Rico	0	0	1	1
5	15	DF	(Cameroon)	Aminou Bouba	1	0	0	1
5	~~16~~	MF	(Spain)	Albert Torras	0	0	1	1
5	18	FW	(Nigeria)	Benjamin Kuku	1	0	0	1
5	33	DF	(India)	Gursimrat Singh	1	0	0	1
5	55	WF	(India)	Samuel Kynshi	0	0	1	1
Own Goals					0	1	0	1
Total					14	1	3	18

=== Clean sheets ===
No.	Nation	Name	I-League	IFA Shield	Super Cup	Total
42	(India)	Shibinraj Kunniyil	3	0	1	4
Total			3	0	1	4

=== Disciplinary record ===
As of match played 30 April 2026

No.	Pos.	Name	I League		IFA Shield		Super Cup		Total	
No.	Pos.	Name	Booked	Sent off (straight red)	Booked	Sent off (straight red)	Booked	Sent off (straight red)	Booked	Sent off (straight red)
1	GK	(India) Rakshit Dagar	0	0	0	0	1	0	1	0
3	DF	(India) Harpreet Singh	1	0	0	0	0	0	1	0
4	DF	(India) Athul Unnikrishnan	1	0	1	0	0	0	2	0
5	DF	(India) Nidhin Krishna	2	0	1	0	0	0	3	0
6	MF	(India) Rishad PP	0	0	0	0	1	0	1	0
7	MF	(Uzbekistan) Mirjalol Kasimov	1	0	0	0	0	0	1	0
11	MF	(India) Ashis Pradhan	1	0	0	0	0	0	1	0
13	MF	(Ivory Coast) Armand Bazié	1	0	0	0	0	0	1	0
15	DF	(Cameroon) Aminou Bouba	2	1	0	0	0	0	2	1
~~15~~	MF	(India) Emil Benny	0	0	1	0	0	0	1	0
17	FW	(Lesotho) Thabiso Brown	2	0	0	0	0	0	2	0
18	DF	(India) Laishram Johnson Singh	0	0	0	0	1	0	1	0
20	MF	(India) Rahul Raju	1	0	1	0	0	0	2	0
22	FW	(India) Moses Lalrinzuala	0	0	1	0	0	0	1	0
23	MF	(India) Trijoy Savio Dias	2	0	0	0	0	1	2	1
26	DF	(Afghanistan) Amid Arezou	2	0	0	0	0	0	2	0
30	MF	(India) Kingslee Fernandes	1	0	0	0	0	0	1	0
31	MF	(India) Shighil Nambrath	1	0	1	0	1	0	3	0
33	DF	(India) Gursimrat Singh	1	0	0	0	1	0	2	0
42	GK	(India) Shibinraj Kunniyil	1	1	0	0	0	0	1	1
43	DF	(India) Soyal Joshy	0	0	0	0	1	0	1	0
