= 2025–26 Indian Football League =

- Season poster
- Season: 2025–26
- Dates: Stage I: 27 February – 19 April; Stage II: 24 April – 23 May 2026
- Champions: Diamond Harbour (1st title)
- Promoted: Diamond Harbour
- Relegated: Namdhari; Churchill Brothers
- Matches: 66
- Goals: 201 (3.05 per match)
- Top goalscorer: Marcus Joseph (9 goals)
- Biggest home win: Shillong Lajong 6–1 Aizawl (18 April 2026)
- Biggest away win: Namdhari 1–4 Chanmari (17 April 2026)
- Highest scoring: Namdhari 4–5 Diamond Harbour (6 April 2026)
- Longest winning run: Diamond Harbour (5 matches)
- Longest unbeaten run: Diamond Harbour (9 matches)
- Longest winless run: Real Kashmir (7 matches)
- Longest losing run: Real Kashmir; Namdhari (4 matches)

The 2025–26 Indian Football League (previously the I-League), also known as the Star Cement Indian Football League (due to sponsorship reasons with Star Cement), was the fourth season of the Indian Football League as the second tier of the Indian football league system, which started on February 27, 2026. Inter Kashi were the reigning champions, having won the 2024–25 I-League.

== Developments ==
- After the Indian Super League received no bids for a sponsor, the I-League was left without a commercial partner too, putting the future of the league in doubt.
- On 15 February 2026, the AIFF announced that the rebranded 2025–26 Indian Football League season will feature a two-stage format. Stage 1 will see the 10 participating clubs compete in a single-leg home-and-away round-robin format. In Stage 2, the teams get divided into two groups. Those that finished in the top half in Stage 1 will advance to a home-and-away championship round, while the bottom half will compete in a centralised relegation round. All points from Stage 1 will be carried forward to Stage 2. The league toppers at the end of Stage 2 will be crowned the Indian Football League champions and will be promoted to the 2026–27 Indian Super League.
- On 8th April 2026, the AIFF informed all clubs that going forward all matches would be played in the evenings under lights to increase primetime viewership. Hence, floodlights would have to be mandatory in every stadium, failing which a fine of 9 lakhs would be imposed in each instance the club failed to comply.

== Club changes ==
The following clubs have changed division since the 2024–25 season:

#	Club	Path
Entered IFL
1	Diamond Harbour	Promoted from 2024–25 IL2 ▲
2	Chanmari	Promoted from 2024–25 IL2 ▲
Exited IFL
1	Inter Kashi	Promoted to 2025–26 ISL ▲
2	Sporting Bengaluru	Relegated to 2025–26 IL2 ▼
3	Delhi	Relegated to 2025–26 IL2 ▼
4	Churchill Brothers	Withdrew and relegated to 2025–26 IL2 ▼

The AIFF appeal committee stayed relegation for Delhi and Sporting Bengaluru from the 2024–25 I-League season until it arrives at a final judgement. Later, CAS terminated SC Bengaluru's appeal over non-payment and both teams entered Indian Football League One in this season.

Churchill Brothers withdrew from the league.

== Clubs ==
Locations of the Indian Football League teams

Team	Location	Stadium	Capacity
Aizawl	Aizawl, Mizoram	Rajiv Gandhi Stadium	20,000
Chanmari	Aizawl, Mizoram	Rajiv Gandhi Stadium	20,000
Dempo	Carambolim, Goa	JLN Stadium	19,000
Diamond Harbour	Diamond Harbour, West Bengal	Bankimanjali Stadium	15,000
Diamond Harbour	Diamond Harbour, West Bengal	Kalyani Stadium	20,000
Gokulam Kerala	Kozhikode, Kerala	Payyanad Stadium	30,000
Namdhari	Bhaini Sahib, Punjab	Namdhari Stadium	1,000
Rajasthan United	Jaipur, Rajasthan	VD Nagar Stadium	3,000
Real Kashmir	Srinagar, Jammu & Kashmir	TRC Turf Ground	10,000
Shillong Lajong	Shillong, Meghalaya	SSA Stadium	5,000
Sreenidi Deccan	Hyderabad, Telangana	Deccan Arena	1,500

== Personnel and sponsorship ==
Team	Head coach	Captain	Kit manufacturer	Shirt sponsor
Aizawl	(India) R Lalruatfela	(India) Vanlalhriatpuia	Vamos	NECS Limited
Chanmari	(India) Dipankur Sharma	(India) Zothanmawia	Six5Six	LESDE Mizoram
Diamond Harbour	(Spain) Kibu Vicuña	(India) Jobby Justin	Nautica	Birla Tyres
Dempo	(India) Samir Naik	(India) Ariston Costa	Shiv Naresh	Dempo
Gokulam Kerala	(Cyprus) Dimitris Dimitriou	(Spain) Nili	FLY HIGH	Sree Gokulam
Namdhari	(India) Harpreet Singh	(India) Jaskaranpreet Singh	SPS Hospitals	Namdharis
Rajasthan United	(India) Vikas Rawat	(India) Bhabindra Malla Thakuri	King Sports	Vertak Group
Real Kashmir	(India) Ishfaq Ahmed	(India) Mohammad Inam	Hummel	Livpure
Shillong Lajong	(India) Birendra Thapa	(India) Kenstar Kharshong	King Sports	Meghalaya Tourism
Sreenidi Deccan	(Portugal) Carlos Vaz Pinto	(Colombia) David Castañeda	Six5Six	Sreenidhi Sports

=== Managerial changes ===
Team	Outgoing manager	Manner of departure	Date of vacancy	Position in the table	Incoming manager	Date of appointment
Gokulam Kerala	(India) Renjith TA	End of interim spell	6 June 2025	Pre-season	(Spain) José Hevia	6 June 2025
Shillong Lajong	(Spain) José Hevia	Mutual consent	5 June 2025	Pre-season	(India) Birendra Thapa	18 July 2025
Sreenidi Deccan	(India) Ishant Singh	End of interim spell	11 November 2025	Pre-season	(Portugal) Carlos Vaz Pinto	12 November 2025
Chanmari	(India) Dipankur Sharma	End of contract	31 May 2025	Pre-season	(India) Victor Lalbiakmawia	20 February 2026
Gokulam Kerala	(Spain) José Hevia	Mutual Consent	10 January 2026	Pre-season	(India) Derrick Pereira	11 January 2026
Gokulam Kerala	(India) Derrick Pereira	Re-appointed as technical director	5 March 2026	9th	(Cyprus) Dimitris Dimitriou	6 March 2026
Chanmari	(India) Victor Lalbiakmawia	Sacked	26 March 2026	7th	(India) Dipankur Sharma	26 March 2026

== Foreign players ==
Bold denotes the player was signed mid-season.

Team	Player 1	Player 2	Player 3	Player 4	Player 5	Player 6	Unregistered player(s)	Former player(s)
Aizawl	(Brazil) Higor Gomes	(Colombia) Luis Rodriguez	(Uzbekistan) Timur Talipov					
Chanmari	(Brazil) Joao Vitor Morais	(Brazil) Pedro Lucas	(Brazil) Marlon Rangel	(Ghana) Emmanuel Badu	(Republic of Ireland) Kyle Degelman			
Diamond Harbour	(Nigeria) Sunday Afolabi	(Slovenia) Luka Majcen	(Spain) Mikel Kortazar	(Spain) Antonio Moyano	(Spain) Hugo Díaz			
Dempo	(Argentina) Damian Perez Roa	(Colombia) Sebastián Gutiérrez	(Colombia) José Luis Moreno	(Ghana) Richmond Kwasi Owusu	(Ivory Coast) Aubin Kouakou	(Trinidad and Tobago) Marcus Joseph		
Gokulam Kerala	(Brazil) Vítor Barata	(Cameroon) Aminou Bouba	(Ivory Coast) Armand Bazié	(Lesotho) Thabiso Brown	(Nigeria) Benjamin Kuku	(Uzbekistan) Mirjalol Kasimov	(Spain) Nili	(Brazil) John Kennedy (Afghanistan) Amid Arezou
Namdhari	(Ghana) Francis Addo	(Ghana) Lamine Moro	(Ghana) Najib Fuseini	(Senegal) Abdoulaye Diallo	(Serbia) Milos Gordic			
Rajasthan United	(Brazil) Jonathan Fernandes	(France) Amadou Soukouna	(Ghana) Abdul Samed Ango	(Ghana) Isaac Nortey	(Spain) Gerard Artigas	(Spain) Jordan Lamela		(Ivory Coast) Cedric Gogoua (Spain) Pedro Astray
Real Kashmir	(Cameroon) Marius Obekop	(Ghana) Kamal Issah	(Ghana) Mamoud Oshie	(Ivory Coast) Djakaridja Traore	(Ivory Coast) Habib Fofana	(Nigeria) Shedrack Charles		(Guinea) Fandje Toure
Shillong Lajong								
Sreenidi Deccan	(Brazil) Paulo Cezar	(Cameroon) Fabrice Kah	(Colombia) David Castañeda	(Curaçao) Roly Bonevacia	(Senegal) Pape Gassama	(Togo) Hadi Idrissou		

== First stage ==
=== First stage league table ===
Pos	Team	Pld	W	D	L	GF	GA	GD	Pts	Qualification
1	Diamond Harbour	9	7	1	1	22	12	+10	22	Promotion round
2	Shillong Lajong	9	5	2	2	16	9	+7	17 (Note: Tied on head-to-head result and head-to-head goal difference. Total goal difference: Shillong Lajong +7, Rajasthan United +3.)	Promotion round
3	Rajasthan United	9	5	2	2	13	10	+3	17	Promotion round
4	Sreenidi Deccan	9	4	3	2	10	8	+2	15	Promotion round
5	Chanmari	9	3	2	4	14	15	−1	11	Promotion round
6	Dempo	9	2	3	4	14	14	0	9 (Note: Head-to-head result: Dempo 3–0 Aizawl.)	Promotion round
7	Aizawl	9	2	3	4	13	22	−9	9	Relegation round
8	Real Kashmir	9	2	2	5	15	14	+1	8 (Note: Head-to-head result: Real Kashmir 6–2 Gokulam Kerala.)	Relegation round
9	Gokulam Kerala	9	2	2	5	11	18	−7	8	Relegation round
10	Namdhari	9	1	4	4	12	18	−6	7	Relegation round

Source: IFL
Rules for classification: 1) Points; 2) Head-to-head points; 3) Head-to-head goal difference; 4) Total goal difference; 5) Total number of goals scored; 6) drawing of lots
(Note: Head-to-head record is used only after all the matches between the teams in question have been played)

=== Fixtures and results ===
Home \ Away	DHB	SRD	SHL	RAJ	AIZ	GOK	NAM	CHN	DEM	REK
Diamond Harbour		0–1				5–2		3–1	2–1	
Sreenidi Deccan			0–0	2–1	1–1		1–1		3–1	
Shillong Lajong	1–2			1–1	6–1					2–1
Rajasthan United	1–1					1–0	3–2	2–0		1–0
Aizawl	0–2			3–1				3–2		2–2
Gokulam Kerala		0–1	0–2		4–2		1–1		2–0	
Namdhari	4–5		0–2		1–1			1–4		
Chanmari		2–1	1–2			0–0			2–2	
Dempo			3–0	1–2	3–0		1–1			2–2
Real Kashmir	1–2	2–0				6–2	0–1	1–2		

Source: IFL
Legend: Blue = home team win; Yellow = draw; Red = away team win.

=== Results by games ===
Team ╲ Round	1	2	3	4	5	6	7	8	9
Aizawl	D	W	D	L	W	L	D	L	L
Namdhari	D	D	L	D	W	D	L	L	L
Sreenidi Deccan	W	L	W	D	W	D	D	W	L
Chanmari	D	W	D	L	L	L	W	L	W
Dempo	D	L	D	L	L	D	W	W	L
Shillong Lajong	D	W	L	W	W	D	L	W	W
Diamond Harbour	L	W	W	W	D	W	W	W	W
Gokulam Kerala	D	D	L	W	L	W	L	L	L
Real Kashmir	D	L	D	L	L	L	L	W	W
Rajasthan United	D	L	W	W	D	W	W	L	W

Source: IFL
W = Win; D = Draw; L = Lose; P = Postponed

=== Positions by round ===
Team ╲ Round	1	2	3	4	5	6	7	8	9
Aizawl	4	1	3	5	4	6	6	6	7
Namdhari	5	6	9	8	6	7	7	9	10
Sreenidi Deccan	1	4	1	3	2	3	3	2	4
Chanmari	8	3	4	6	7	8	8	7	5
Dempo	2	8	8	10	10	9	9	5	6
Shillong Lajong	7	2	5	2	1	2	4	4	2
Diamond Harbour	10	5	2	1	3	1	1	1	1
Gokulam Kerala	9	7	10	7	8	5	5	8	9
Real Kashmir	3	9	7	9	9	10	10	10	8
Rajasthan United	6	10	6	4	5	4	2	3	3

Source: IFL
= Promotion round; = Relegation round

== Promotion round ==
=== Points table ===
Pos	Team	Pld	W	D	L	GF	GA	GD	Pts	Promotion
1	Diamond Harbour (C, P)	14	9	2	3	31	20	+11	29	Promotion to ISL
2	Shillong Lajong	14	8	4	2	28	12	+16	28	
3	Sreenidi Deccan	14	7	5	2	18	13	+5	26	
4	Rajasthan United	14	5	3	6	20	24	−4	18	
5	Chanmari	14	4	3	7	19	25	−6	15	
6	Dempo	14	3	6	5	17	18	−1	15	

Source: IFL
Rules for classification: 1) Points; 2) Head-to-head points; 3) Head-to-head goal difference; 4) Total goal difference; 5) Total number of goals scored; 6) drawing of lots
(Note: Head-to-head record is used only after all the matches between the teams in question have been played)
(C) Champions; (P) Promoted

=== Fixtures and results ===
Home \ Away	DHB	SHL	RAJ	SRD	CHN	DEM
Diamond Harbour		0–3	5–2	1–2		
Shillong Lajong			4–2		4–0	0–0
Rajasthan United				1–2	2–2	0–1
Sreenidi Deccan		1–1			2–1	
Chanmari	0–2					2–0
Dempo	1–1			1–1		

Source: IFL
Legend: Blue = home team win; Yellow = draw; Red = away team win.

=== Results by games ===
Team ╲ Round	1	2	3	4	5
Sreenidi Deccan	W	W	D	W	D
Chanmari	L	L	W	L	D
Dempo	D	W	L	D	D
Shillong Lajong	D	W	D	W	W
Diamond Harbour	W	L	W	D	L
Rajasthan United	L	L	L	L	D

Source: IFL
W = Win; D = Draw; L = Lose; P = Postponed

=== Positions by round ===
Team ╲ Round	1	2	3	4	5
Sreenidi Deccan	3	3	3	3	3
Chanmari	5	6	5	6	6
Dempo	6	5	6	5	5
Shillong Lajong	2	2	2	2	2
Diamond Harbour	1	1	1	1	1
Rajasthan United	4	4	4	4	4

Source: IFL
= Promotion

== Relegation round ==
=== Points table ===
Pos	Team	Pld	W	D	L	GF	GA	GD	Pts	Relegation
1	Real Kashmir	12	4	2	6	20	18	+2	14	
2	Aizawl	12	3	4	5	18	27	−9	13	
3	Gokulam Kerala	12	3	3	6	14	23	−9	12	
4	Namdhari (R)	12	2	4	6	16	21	−5	10	Relegation to IL2

Source: IFL
Rules for classification: 1) Points; 2) Head-to-head points; 3) Head-to-head goal difference; 4) Total goal difference; 5) Total number of goals scored; 6) drawing of lots
(Note: Head-to-head record is used only after all the matches between the teams in question have been played)
(R) Relegated

=== Fixtures and results ===
Home \ Away	AIZ	REK	GOK	NAM
Aizawl		1–2	2–2	2–1
Real Kashmir			3–0	0–3
Gokulam Kerala				1–0
Namdhari				

Source: IFL
Legend: Blue = home team win; Yellow = draw; Red = away team win.

=== Results by games ===
Team ╲ Round	1	2	3
Aizawl	W	D	L
Namdhari	L	W	L
Gokulam Kerala	L	D	W
Real Kashmir	W	L	W

Source: IFL
W = Win; D = Draw; L = Lose; P = Postponed

=== Positions by round ===
Team ╲ Round	1	2	3
Aizawl	1	1	2
Namdhari	4	3	4
Gokulam Kerala	3	4	3
Real Kashmir	2	2	1

Source: IFL
= Relegation

== Final league table ==
Pos	Team	Pld	W	D	L	GF	GA	GD	Pts	Qualification
1	Diamond Harbour	14	9	2	3	31	20	+11	29	Promotion to ISL
2	Shillong Lajong	14	8	4	2	28	12	+16	28	
3	Sreenidi Deccan	14	7	5	2	18	13	+5	26	
4	Rajasthan United	14	5	3	6	20	24	−4	18	
5	Chanmari	14	4	3	7	19	25	−6	15 (Note: Head-to-head points: Chanmari 4, Dempo 1.)	
6	Dempo	14	3	6	5	17	18	−1	15	
7	Real Kashmir	12	4	2	6	20	18	+2	14	
8	Aizawl	12	3	4	5	18	27	−9	13	
9	Gokulam Kerala	12	3	3	6	14	23	−9	12	
10	Namdhari	12	2	4	6	16	21	−5	10	Relegation to IL2

Source: IFL

== Season statistics ==
=== Top scorers ===
Rank	Player	Team	Goals
1	(Trinidad and Tobago) Marcus Joseph	Dempo	9
2	(India) Phrangki Buam	Shillong Lajong	8
2	(Spain) Hugo Díaz	Diamond Harbour	8
4	(India) Everbrightson Mylliempdah	Shillong Lajong	7
5	(India) Zomuansanga	Aizawl	6
6	(Spain) Antonio Moyano	Diamond Harbour	5
6	(Colombia) David Castañeda	Sreenidi Deccan	5
6	(Spain) Gerard Artigas	Rajasthan United	5
9	(Nigeria) Shedrack Charles	Real Kashmir	4
9	(Slovenia) Luka Majcen	Diamond Harbour	4
9	(France) Amadou Soukouna	Rajasthan United	4
9	(Togo) Hadi Idrissou	Sreenidi Deccan	4
9	(India) Manvir Singh	Namdhari	4
9	(India) Gladdy Nelcen Kharbuli	Shillong Lajong	4
9	(India) Treimiki Lamurong	Shillong Lajong	4

=== Top assists ===
Rank	Player	Team	Assists
1	(Lesotho) Thabiso Brown	Gokulam Kerala	4
1	(Spain) Antonio Moyano	Diamond Harbour	4
3	(India) Bryce Miranda	Diamond Harbour	3
3	(India) Jobby Justin	Diamond Harbour	3
3	(Brazil) Joao Vitor Morais	Chanmari	3
3	(India) P Christopher Kamei	Chanmari	3
3	(India) H Lalrempuia	Aizawl	3
3	(Nigeria) Shedrack Charles	Real Kashmir	3
3	(India) Ephraim Lalremtluanga	Shillong Lajong	3
10	(India) Gladdy Nelcen Kharbuli	Shillong Lajong	2
10	(India) Jakob Vanlalhlimpuia	Shillong Lajong	2
10	(India) Laltlanzova	Aizawl	2
10	(India) Vincent Lalduhawma	Aizawl	2
10	(Brazil) Jonathan Fernandes	Rajasthan United	2
10	(India) Gautam Virwani	Rajasthan United	2
10	(India) Jaskaranpreet Singh	Namdhari	2
10	(India) Bhupinder Singh	Namdhari	2
10	(India) Hardik Bhatt	Sreenidi Deccan	2
10	(Colombia) Sebastian Gutierrez	Dempo	2
10	(India) Halicharan Narzary	Diamond Harbour	2
10	(India) Moses Lalrinzuala	Gokulam Kerala	2

=== Clean sheets ===
Rank	Player	Team	Clean sheets
1	(India) Ashish Sibi	Dempo	4
1	(India) Ranit Sarkar (Note: Substituted in for Siwel Rymbai at 36' against Chanmari)	Shillong Lajong	4
3	(India) Shibinraj Kunniyil	Gokulam Kerala	3
3	(India) Bhabindra Malla Thakuri	Rajasthan United	3
3	(India) Siwel Rymbai	Shillong Lajong	3
6	(India) Zothanmawia	Chanmari	2
6	(India) Niraj Kumar	Namdhari	2
6	(India) Dheeraj Singh	Diamond Harbour	2
6	(India) Furqan Ahmad Dar	Real Kashmir	2
6	(India) Kamaljit Singh	Sreenidi Deccan	2

== Awards ==
Player of the match
Match no.	Player	Team	Match no.	Player	Team	Match no.	Player	Team
1	(India) Nishan Singh	Namdhari	2	(India) Zothanmawia	Chanmari	3	(Cameroon) Fabrice Kah	Sreenidi Deccan
4	(Colombia) Sebastian Guiterrez	Dempo	5	(France) Amadou Soukouna	Rajasthan United	6	(India) Vincent Lalduhawma	Aizawl
7	(India) Niraj Kumar	Namdhari	8	(Brazil) Joao Vitor Morais	Chanmari	9	(Spain) Hugo Díaz	Diamond Harbour
10	(India) Phrangki Buam	Shillong Lajong	11	(Trinidad and Tobago) Marcus Joseph	Dempo	12	(France) Amadou Soukouna (2)	Rajasthan United
13	(India) Ahteeb Ahmad Dar	Real Kashmir	14	(India) Hardik Bhatt	Sreenidi Deccan	15	(India) Siwel Rymbai	Shillong Lajong
16	(France) Amadou Soukouna (3)	Rajasthan United	17	(India) Phrangki Buam (2)	Shillong Lajong	18	(Togo) Hadi Idrissou	Sreenidi Deccan
19	(India) Shibinraj Kunniyil	Gokulam Kerala	20	(Spain) Antonio Moyano	Diamond Harbour	21	(India) Laldawngzuala	Aizawl
22	(India) Niraj Kumar (2)	Namdhari	23	(Togo) Hadi Idrissou (2)	Sreenidi Deccan	24	(India) Abhishek Ambekar	Rajasthan United
25	(India) Treimiki Lamurong	Shillong Lajong	26	(India) Rahul Raju	Gokulam Kerala	27	(France) Amadou Soukouna (4)	Rajasthan United
28	(India) Kamaljit Singh	Sreenidi Deccan	29	(Spain) Hugo Díaz (2)	Diamond Harbour	30	(India) Bidyashagar Singh	Namdhari

== See also ==
- Men
  - 2025–26 Indian Super League (Tier I)
  - 2025–26 I-League 2 (Tier III)
  - 2025–26 I-League 3 (Tier IV)
  - 2025–26 Indian State Leagues (Tier V)
  - 2025–26 AIFF Super Cup
  - 2025 Durand Cup
  - 2026 Reliance Foundation Development League
- Women
  - 2025–26 Indian Women's League (Tier I)
  - 2025–26 Indian Women's League 2 (Tier II)
