= Moyano =

Moyano is a surname originating from Spain. The conquistador Sebastián de Belalcázar, whose birth name was Sebastián Moyano y Cabrera, spread his surname in Latin American and Filipino territory. Notable people with the surname include:

- Alexia Betiana Moyano (born 1982), Argentine actress
- Antonio Moyano Carrasquilla (born 2000), Spanish footballer
- Aurelio Moyano (1938–2020), Argentine footballer
- Diego Moyano (born 1975), Argentine tennis player
- Enzo Josue Moyano (born 1989), Argentine cyclist
- Fabián Gustavo Moyano Batres (born 1986), Argentine footballer
- Facundo Moyano (born 1984), Argentine trade unionist and politician
- Francisco Sebastián "Sebas" Moyano Jiménez (born 1997), Spanish footballer
- Franco David Moyano (born 1997), Argentine footballer
- Gabriel Oscar Moyano Agüero (born 1992), Argentine footballer
- Hugo Moyano (born 1944), Argentine syndicalist
- Javier 'Javi' Moyano Lujano (born 1986), Spanish footballer
- Lisandro Moyano (born 1983), Argentine footballer
- Manuel Moyano (born 1963), Spanish writer
- María Elena Moyano Delgado (1958–1992), Peruvian activist
- Martha Lupe Moyano Delgado (born 1964), Peruvian nurse and politician
- Martín Bustos Moyano (born 1985), Argentine rugby player
- Miguel Moyano, Colombian artist
- Mònica López Moyano (born 1975), Spanish meteorologist and television presenter
- Nilda Moyano (born 1976), Argentine politician
- Ramiro Moyano (born 1990), Argentine rugby union player
- Ricardo Moyano (born 1961), Argentine musician and composer
- Santiago Moyano (born 1997), Argentine footballer
- Sebastián Moyano (1480–1551), Spanish conquistador
- Sebastián Emanuel Moyano (born 1990), Argentine footballer
- Walter Moyano (born 1933), Uruguayan cyclist
- Xavier Moyano (born 1981), Argentine musician; producer, performer, composer, and educator
