= Albert Torras =

Spanish footballer

Personal information
- Full name: Albert Torras Crespo
- Date of birth: 13 June 1996 (age 30)
- Place of birth: Vallgorguina, Spain
- Height: 1.83 m (6 ft 0 in)
- Position: Midfielder

Team information
- Current team: Bars
- Number: 18

Youth career
- PB Sant Celoni
- 2005–2011: Espanyol
- 2011–2013: Barcelona
- 2013–2015: Wolverhampton Wanderers

Senior career*
Years	Team	Apps	(Gls)
2015–2017	Málaga B	28	(1)
2017	Almudévar	14	(4)
2017–2019	Zaragoza B	50	(14)
2019	Zaragoza	1	(0)
2019–2020	Ejea	33	(9)
2021	Lleida Esportiu	15	(1)
2021–2022	Peña Deportiva	15	(3)
2022	Calahorra	12	(0)
2022–2024	Badalona Futur	47	(5)
2024–2025	Olot	15	(1)
2025	Ejea	16	(1)
2025–2026	Gokulam Kerala	0	(0)
2026–	Bars	1	(0)
- * Club domestic league appearances and goals as of 10 March 2026

Albert Torras Crespo (born 13 June 1996) is a Spanish footballer who plays as a midfielder for Kyrgyz Premier League club Bars.

== Club career ==
Born in Vallgorguina, Barcelona, Catalonia, Torras joined FC Barcelona's La Masia in 2011, after representing RCD Espanyol and Penya Barcelonista Sant Celoni. On 12 August 2013, he moved abroad for the first time in his career and agreed to a three-year contract with Championship side Wolverhampton Wanderers.

On 18 July 2015, Torras returned to his homeland and joined Málaga CF, being assigned to the reserves in Tercera División. He made his senior debut on 22 August by starting in a 2–0 away win against CD Comarca del Mármol, and scored his first goal the following 13 March, in a 3–0 away defeat of Vélez CF.

On 19 January 2017, Torras moved to another reserve team, AD Almudévar, after agreeing to a 18-month contract. In July, he signed for Real Zaragoza and was assigned to the B-team.

On 9 June 2019, after scoring 12 goals during the campaign, Torras made his professional debut by coming on as a second-half substitute for Raúl Guti in a 0–1 Segunda División away loss against CD Tenerife.
