= Rakshit Dagar =

Indian footballer (born 1992)

Personal information
- Full name: Rakshit Dagar
- Date of birth: 16 October 1992 (age 34)
- Place of birth: Delhi, India
- Height: 1.86 m (6 ft 1 in)
- Position: Goalkeeper

Team information
- Current team: Gokulam Kerala
- Number: 1

Senior career*
Years	Team	Apps	(Gls)
2012–2014	United Sikkim	11	(0)
2015–2016	DSK Shivajinas	20	(0)
2016–2017	Kenkre	3	(0)
2017–2018	Minerva Punjab	9	(0)
2018–2020	East Bengal	18	(0)
2020–2021	Sudeva Delhi	10	(0)
2021–2022	Gokulam Kerala	18	(0)
2022–2024	Jamshedpur		
2024–2025	Inter Kashi		
2025–	Gokulam Kerala	4	(0)
- * Club domestic league appearances and goals

Rakshit Dagar (born 16 October 1992) is an Indian professional footballer who plays as a goalkeeper for Gokulam Kerala in the I-League.

== Club career ==
=== United Sikkim ===
Dagar made his debut for United Sikkim F.C. on 23 March 2013 during an I-League match against Prayag United S.C. at the Paljor Stadium in Gangtok, Sikkim in which he was in the starting 11; United Sikkim lost the match 0–1.

=== DSK Shivajians ===
Rakshit Dagar did not play any I-League matches for DSK Shivajians but he played several matches in the Durand Cup, Federation Cup, and DSK Cup.

=== Minerva Punjab ===
In September 2017, Dagar make his move to the only I-League club from north India. As a part of Minerva Punjab FC, Dagar was also in the Minerva Squad of Punjab League.

=== East Bengal ===
On 23 April 2018, Dagar joined East Bengal.

=== Gokulam Kerala ===
Dagar joined Gokulam Kerala on 9 July 2021. He played a crucial role as the club clinched I-League title in 2021–22 season, defeating Mohammedan Sporting 2–1 in the final game at the Salt Lake Stadium on 14 May, and became the first club in fifteen years to defend the title.

At the 2022 AFC Cup group-stage opener, Dagar and his side achieved a historic 4–2 win against Indian Super League side ATK Mohun Bagan.

== Career statistics ==
=== Club ===
As of 27 October 2025

Club	Season	League			League Cup		Domestic Cup		AFC		Total	
Club	Season	Division	Apps	Goals	Apps	Goals	Apps	Goals	Apps	Goals	Apps	Goals!
United Sikkim	2012–13	I-League	3	0	1	0	0	0	—		4	0
United Sikkim	2013–14	I-League	8	0	0	0	3	0	—		11	0
DSK Shivajians	2014–15	I-League	5	0	0	0	0	0	—		5	0
DSK Shivajians	2015–16	I-League	6	0	0	0	0	0	—		6	0
DSK Shivajians	2016–17	I-League	9	0	0	0	0	0	—		9	0
Kenkre	2016–17	I-League 2nd Division	3	0	0	0	—		—		3	0
Minerva Punjab	2017–18	I-League	9	0	0	0	—		—		9	0
East Bengal	2018–19	I-League	18	0	—		10 (Note: Appearance(s) in Calcutta Premier Division)	0	—		28	0
East Bengal	2019–20	I-League	0	0	—		1	0	—		1	0
Sudeva Delhi	2020–21	I-League	10	0	—		0	0	—		10	0
Gokulam Kerala	2020–21	I-League	0	0	—		3 (Note: Appearance(s) in Durand Cup)	0	—		3	0
Gokulam Kerala	2021–22	I-League	18	0	—		8 (Note: Appearance(s) in IFA Shield)	0	3 (Note: Appearance(s) in AFC Cup)	0	29	0
Jamshedpur FC	2022-23	Indian Super League	0	0	0	0	—		—		0	0
Jamshedpur FC	2023–24	Indian Super League	0	0	0	0	—		—		0	0
Inter Kashi	2024–25	I-League	—									
Gokulam Kerala	2024–25	I-League	4	0	0	0	—				4	0
Gokulam Kerala	2025–26	I-League	0	0	1 (Note: Appearance(s) in Super Cup)	0	1	0			2	0

== Honours ==
Gokulam Kerala

- I-League: 2021–22
