= Harpreet Singh (footballer, born 2002) =

Indian footballer

Personal information
- Full name: Harpreet Singh
- Date of birth: November 1, 2002 (age 24)
- Place of birth: Amritsar, Punjab, India
- Height: 1.75 m (5 ft 9 in)
- Positions: Centre-back; right back

Team information
- Current team: Gokulam Kerala
- Number: 3

Youth career
- 2016–2019: Ozone

Senior career*
Years	Team	Apps	(Gls)
2019–2021	Indian Arrows	3	(0)
2021–2023	Bengaluru B	12	(1)
2023–2025	Namdhari	33	(2)
2025–	Gokulam Kerala	2	(0)

International career
2017–2018	India U17	27	(2)
- * Club domestic league appearances and goals as of 21:33, 7 March 2026 (UTC)

Harpreet Singh (born 1 November 2002) is an Indian professional footballer who plays as a defender for I-League club Gokulam Kerala.

== Career ==
Harpreet, with other three footballers was brought to the Ozone F.C. residential academy from Dibbipura, 50 km off Amritsar, Punjab in 2016. Harpreet was signed by Indian Arrows in 2019–20 season. He made his professional debut for the Indian Arrows side against Punjab F.C. on 16 December 2019, He started and played full match as Indian Arrows lost 1–0.

== Career statistics ==
=== Club ===
As of 7 March 2026

Club	Season	League			National Cup		League Cup		Continental		Total	
Club	Season	Division	Apps	Goals	Apps	Goals	Apps	Goals	Apps	Goals	Apps	Goals
Indian Arrows	2019–20	I-League	3	0	—		—		—		3	0
Bengaluru B	2022–23	I-League 2nd Division	6	0	—		—		—		6	0
Bengaluru B	2023	RFDL	6	1	—		—		—		6	1
Bengaluru B	Total		12	1	0	0	0	0	0	0	12	1
Namdhari	2023–24	I-League	14	2	—		—		—		14	2
Namdhari	2024–25	I-League	19	0	—		—		—		19	0
Namdhari	Total		33	2	0	0	0	0	0	0	33	2
Gokulam Kerla	2025–26	I-League	2	0	3 (Note: Appearance(s) in Super Cup)	0	1 (Note: Appearance(s) in IFA Shield)	—	—		6	0
Career total			50	3	3	0	1	0	0	0	54	3
