= Hugo Díaz (footballer, born 1997) =

Spanish footballer

Personal information
- Full name: Hugo Díaz Rodríguez
- Date of birth: 9 February 1997 (age 29)
- Place of birth: A Coruña, Spain
- Height: 1.84 m (6 ft 0 in)
- Positions: Attacking midfielder; centre midfielder

Team information
- Current team: Gokulam Kerala

Youth career
- –2016: Deportivo La Coruña
- 2017–2018: Leeds United

Senior career*
Years	Team	Apps	(Gls)
2015–2017	Deportivo B	8	(1)
2017	→ Silva (loan)	14	(1)
2017–2019	Leeds United	1	(0)
2019–2020	Getafe B	26	(2)
2020–2021	Korona Kielce	10	(0)
2021–2022	Salamanca	12	(0)
2022	Bergantiños	14	(0)
2022–2025	Gimnástica Segoviana	80	(15)
2025–2026	Xerez	2	(0)
2026	Diamond Harbour	13	(8)
2026–	Gokulam Kerala	0	(0)
- * Club domestic league appearances and goals as of 23 May 2026

Hugo Díaz Rodríguez (Note: In this Spanish name, the first or paternal surname is Díaz and the second or maternal family name is Rodríguez.) (born 9 February 1997), known as Hugo Díaz (Spanish pronunciation: [ˈuɣo ˈði.aθ] (Note: In isolation, Díaz is pronounced [ˈdi.aθ].)), is a Spanish professional footballer who plays as an attacking midfielder or centre midfielder for Indian Football League club Gokulam Kerala.

== Club career ==
=== Early career ===
Díaz started his career at Deportivo La Coruña youth academy, graduating to Depor Juvenil A and then the Deportivo de La Coruña B team, in January 2017 he then had a loan spell at A Coruña based team Silva SD.

=== Leeds United ===
On 18 August 2017, he joined Leeds United from Deportivo, initially linking up with the Leeds Under 23s squad. In the Under 23s he formed a central defence partnership with Paudie O'Connor.

On 10 April 2018, after an injury crisis to Leeds' first team defenders, Díaz was promoted to Leeds' first team and named as a substitute in their EFL Championship game against Preston North End. Díaz made his debut for Leeds in the same game coming on early in the second half for injured centre back Pontus Jansson, partnering his usual Under 23 teammate Paudie O'Connor for the first team in a 1–3 loss. On 8 May, he was named in Leeds' first team squad by head coach Paul Heckingbottom for their post season friendlies tour to Myanmar.

He featured in Leeds' first team during the 2018/19 pre season under new head coach Marcelo Bielsa. He made his first appearance for Leeds' first team of pre-season in the friendly match 1–1 draw against York City on 20 July 2018

He was named in the first team squad again on 6 January 2019, when he was an unused subsistute during a 2–1 defeat to Queens Park Rangers in the third round of the FA Cup.

Díaz captained the Leeds United 23s side over the course of the 2018/19 season, that won the PDL Northern League 2018/19 Season by winning the league, they then became the national Professional Development League Champions by beating Birmingham City in the final.

On 22 June 2019, Díaz announced on his Twitter page that the club had released him.

=== Getafe ===
On 25 July 2019, Díaz joined La Liga side Getafe CF on a free transfer from Leeds United, being assigned to the B-team in Segunda División B. Diaz was released by Getafe CF in July 2020

=== Korona Kielce ===
On 13 November 2020, Díaz was signed by I liga side Korona Kielce.

=== Diamond Harbour ===
Díaz joined Indian Football League club Diamond Harbour in February 2026. In his debut season, he became the club's top scorer, helping them winning the league title and secure promotion to the Indian Super League.

== Career statistics ==
As of match played 18 April 2018

Appearances and goals by club, season and competition
Club	Season	League			National cup		League cup		Other		Total	
Club	Season	Division	Apps	Goals	Apps	Goals	Apps	Goals	Apps	Goals	Apps	Goals
Leeds United	2017–18	Championship	1	0	0	0	0	0	0	0	1	0
Korona Kielce	2020–21	I liga	10	0	—		—		—		10	0
Career total			11	0	0	0	1	0	0	0	11	0

== Honours ==
Diamond Harbour

- Indian Football League: 2025–26
