= Carlos Eduardo Parreira =

Brazilian football manager

Personal information
- Date of birth: 10 April 1981 (age 45)
- Place of birth: Brazil

Team information
- Current team: Gokulam Kerala (head coach)

Managerial career
- Years: Team
- 2002–2005: Flamengo Academy
- 2006: MPPJ Malaysia
- 2006: Wuhan China
- 2007–2008: Emirates Club Reserves
- 2008–2013: Golden Arrows
- 2014–15: Al Ittihad Kalba UAE
- 2016: Las Vegas United Usa
- 2018–2019: Chiangmai
- 2020: Chiangmai United
- 2021–2022: Khon Kaen United
- 2023: Al-Qaisumah
- 2024: CSE
- 2024: Rayong
- 2025–2026: Madura United
- 2026–: Gokulam Kerala

Carlos Eduardo Parreira is a Brazilian professional football manager. He is currently coaching the Indian Football League club Gokulam Kerala.

== Managerial statistics ==
As of 14 November 2026

Managerial record by team and tenure
Team	Nat.	From	To	Record					Ref.
Team	Nat.	From	To	G	W	D	L	Win %	Ref.
Chiangmai	(Thailand)	4 January 2018	15 June 2019	16	3	3	10	18.75	
Chiangmai United	(Thailand)	16 January 2020	30 October 2020	11	7	4	0	63.64	
Khonkaen United	(Thailand)	10 May 2021	29 October 2022	46	14	11	21	30.43	
Al-Qaisumah	(Saudi Arabia)	1 July 2023	31 January 2024	20	3	3	14	15.00	
CSE	(Brazil)	5 February 2024	12 April 2024	5	2	2	1	40.00	
Rayong	(Thailand)	15 June 2024	28 October 2024	10	2	2	6	20.00	
Madura United	(Indonesia)	13 November 2025	14 March 2026	14	1	4	9	7.14	
Gokulam Kerala	(India)	28 July 2026	Present	3	3	0	0	100.00	
Career Total				125	35	29	61	28.00	
