= Gabriel Moyano =

Argentine footballer

Personal information
- Full name: Gabriel Oscar Moyano Agüero
- Date of birth: 28 July 1992 (age 34)
- Place of birth: Mendoza, Argentina
- Height: 1.69 m (5 ft 7 in)
- Position: Midfielder

Youth career
- Boca Juniors Bermejo

Senior career*
Years	Team	Apps	(Gls)
2010–2015	Godoy Cruz	1	(0)
2012	→ Andes Talleres (loan)	6	(0)
2014	→ Magallanes (loan)	4	(0)
2015–2017	Huracán Las Heras	30	(3)
2017	Unión San Felipe	7	(0)
2018	Boca Juniors Bermejo	–	(–)
2019–2020	FADEP	10	(0)
2021	CEC Mendoza	–	(–)
2022	Argentino de Mendoza	13	(1)
- * Club domestic league appearances and goals

Gabriel Oscar Moyano Agüero (born 28 July 1992) is an Argentine footballer who plays as a midfielder.

== Teams ==
- (Argentina) Godoy Cruz 2010–2012
- (Argentina) Andes Talleres 2012
- (Argentina) Godoy Cruz 2013
- (Chile) Magallanes 2014
- (Argentina) Godoy Cruz 2015
- (Argentina) Huracán Las Heras 2015–2017
- (Chile) Unión San Felipe 2017
- (Argentina) Boca Juniors Bermejo 2018
- (Argentina) FADEP 2019–2020
- (Argentina) CEC Mendoza 2021
- (Argentina) Argentino de Mendoza 2022
