= Miguel Moyano =

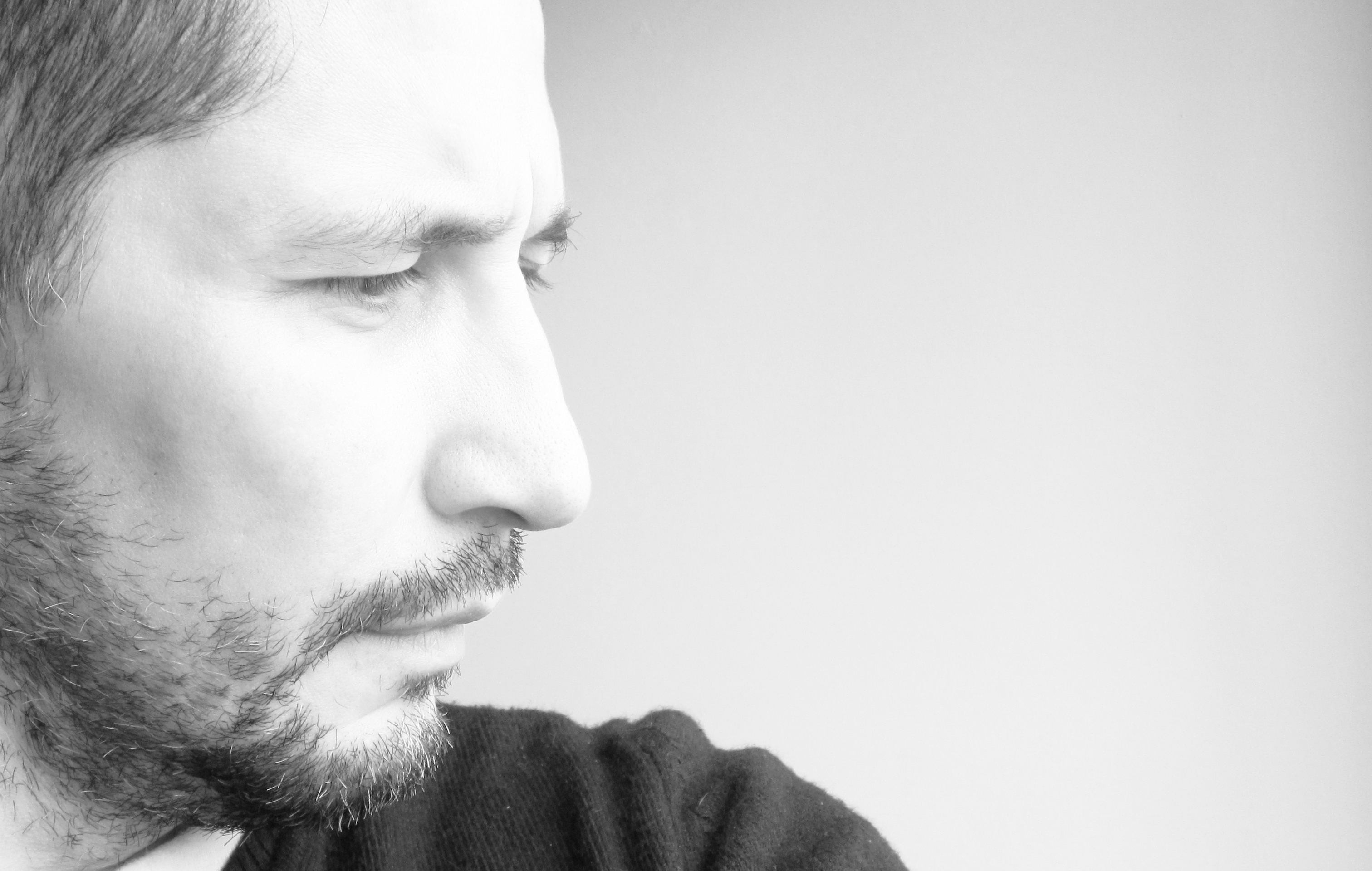

Miguel Moyano is a Colombian artist born in Bogotá, he studied at the National University of Colombia and at the Art League Houston(USA), specializing in three-dimensional drawing at the Schule für Gestaltung Bern and Volkshochschule Bern, (Switzerland), he took anatomy drawing classes with the Russian master Udo Siig, engraving classes with master Luis Paz and painting classes with the Vatican miniaturist, Marisa Schmitt-Viassone.

Registered within realism, the drawing of Miguel Moyano is characterized by an obsessive search of perfection in form, in which the artist goes into the spirit of what it represents and reflects it in his work. His training in the German school is shown in a rigorous drawing, working on three recurring themes: objects, figure and landscape.

In 1974 he won the Prismacolor Drawing Award.

In 1993 he had his first exhibition in Switzerland and since then has participated in more than a hundred exhibitions in Colombia and abroad.

In 2002 he made a mural at the Children's Museum es:Museo de los Niños de Bogotá, in 2003 he won a national award in the Poetry Contest: Rest in Peace War, organized by the Silva Poetry House and in 2005 he won the Salón Nacional de Agosto organized by the Museum of Contemporary Art.

In 2008, during the Ibero-American Year of Museums, one of his drawings was included in Masterpieces of the Colombian Collections, in 2012 one of his drawings was included in 100 Masterpieces of the Museum of Contemporary Art in Bogotá and in 2013 one of his works was selected for the book: Colombia is only one, of Porvenir.

In 2017 his work was selected by ARCOT to be exhibited in Tokyo; in this same year he was named Honorary Member of the Museum of Contemporary Art of Bogotá.

In 2024, he won the National Art Legacy Award in Bogotá.

Has developed an intense activity as an artist and his works are in museums and are part of important collections.

He currently lives and works in Houston.
