= Antonio Moyano =

Antonio Moyano may refer to:

- Antonio Moyano (footballer, born 2000), Spanish football central midfielder.
- Antonio Moyano (footballer, born 1928) (1928–2010), Spanish football manager and footballer
