= John Kennedy (footballer, born 2000) =

Brazilian footballer (born 2000)

Personal information
- Full name: John Kennedy Xavier da Costa
- Date of birth: 30 August 2000 (age 26)
- Place of birth: Brazil
- Height: 1.90 m (6 ft 3 in)
- Position: Forward

Team information
- Current team: Malappuram

Youth career
- 2023: Cametá

Senior career*
| Years | Team | Apps | (Gls) |
| 2023–2024 | Izabelense | 0 | (0) |
| 2024 | São Francisco | 8 | (1) |
| 2024 | Humaitá | 8 | (2) |
| 2024 | Calicut | 4 | (2) |
| 2025 | Humaitá | 4 | (1) |
| 2025 | Izabelense | 0 | (0) |
| 2025 | Machan | 0 | (0) |
| 2025–2026 | Malappuram | 11 | (8) |
| 2026 | Gokulam Kerala | 2 | (0) |
| 2026- | Malappuram | 0 | (0) |
- * Club domestic league appearances and goals as of 17:51, 8 November 2026 (UTC)

John Kennedy Xavier da Costa (born 30 August 2000), known as John Kennedy, is a professional footballer who plays as a forward for Super League Kerala club Malappuram FC.

== Career ==
=== 2024 - Calicut FC ===
On 12 October 2024, he was signed by Super League Kerala club Calicut. He debuted for the club on 26 October 2024, and scored his maiden SLK goal on 31 October 2024, against Kannur Warriors. He totally made 4 appearances, scored 2 goals and gave one assist for the club in that season.

=== 2025–26 - Malappuram FC ===
On 27 August 2025, Kennedy returned to Super League Kerala, joining Malappuram. He was an integral part of the club, as he made 11 appearances, and scored 8 goals. He also became the Golden Boot winner of the 2025 Super League Kerala season.
