= The Sanctuary (Kochi) =

Base of Kerala Blasters FC

- Interactive map of The Sanctuary
- Location: Thrippunithura; Kochi India
- Coordinates: 9°56′31.86″N 76°20′15.68″E
- Owner: Kerala Blasters FC
- Type: Football training ground

Construction
- Opened: 2025

Tenant
- Kerala Blasters FC (training) (2025-)

The Sanctuary is the training ground and academy base of the Indian football club Kerala Blasters FC. The club officially announced the completion of development on 5 September 2025.

Located in Thrippunithura (Kochi, Kerala, India) to the east of Kochi and north of Thrippunithura Mini Bypass Road, and covering 7140 m^{2}, it has been used for training of senior team, academy, and reserves since 2025.

The land occupied by The Sanctuary is leased from the Sree Narayana Vidyapeetam Public School, Thrippunithura, on a ten year agreement. It took the club almost eighteen months to complete the construction of the facility.

The name Sanctuary reflects the spirit of Kerala Blasters. Inspired by the elephant in the club crest, a symbol of Kerala's strength & identity, it represents a safe space where players & staff can prepare, grow & thrive together.

== Facilities ==
Apart from the pristine Bermuda grass pitch, the facility also includes dedicated spaces for:
• recovery
• medical care
• performance analysis
• meetings
• media operations
• dressing rooms for the players and coaches
