= Fabrice Kah =

Cypriot footballer

Personal information
- Full name: Fabrice Kah Nkwoh
- Date of birth: March 9, 1996 (age 30)
- Place of birth: Yaoundé, Cameroon
- Height: 1.70 m (5 ft 7 in)
- Position: Winger

Team information
- Current team: Sreenidi Deccan
- Number: 14

Senior career*
Years	Team	Apps	(Gls)
2017–2019	U.D. Leiria	49	(6)
2020–2023	Olympiakos Nicosia	85	(10)
2023–2024	AEL Limassol	25	(2)
2024–2025	Panserraikos	0	(0)
2025–2026	Ayia Napa	11	(2)
2026–	Sreenidi Deccan	5	(3)
- * Club domestic league appearances and goals as of 16:23, 25 March 2026 (UTC)

Fabrice Kah Nkwoh (born 9 March 1996) is a Cameroonian professional footballer. As of 2026, he is a winger for Indian Football League club Sreenidi Deccan. He scored his first goal in the Indian Football League on 28 February 2026.

Before moving to India, he played for several clubs in Cyprus, including Olympiakos Nicosia, AEL Limassol, and Ayia Napa. Early in his career, he played for U.D. Leiria in Portugal. He trained at the École de Football de Brasseries du Cameroun.
