= Mirjalol Kasimov (footballer, born 1995) =

Uzbek footballer

Personal information
- Date of birth: 20 November 1995 (age 30)
- Place of birth: Uzbekistan
- Height: 1.74 m (5 ft 9 in)
- Position: Defensive midfielder

Team information
- Current team: Victory SC

Youth career
- 2015: Qizilqum

Senior career*
Years	Team	Apps	(Gls)
2016–2021	Qizilqum	47	(3)
2022	Aral Samalı	4	(1)
2022–2023	NEROCA	19	(3)
2023–2025	Mohammedan	42	(6)
2026	Gokulam Kerala	4	(1)
2026–	Victory SC	0	(0)
- * Club domestic league appearances and goals as of 19:00, 20 March 2026 (UTC)

Mirjalol Kasimov (born 20 November 1995) is an Uzbek professional footballer who plays as a midfielder for the Dhivehi Premier League club Victory SC.

== Club career ==
=== Mohammedan SC ===
On 22 July 2023, he joined I-League club Mohammedan. He made 21 appearances and scored four goals.

=== Gokulam Kerala ===
On 04 February 2026, Kasimov was signed by Indian Football League club Gokulam Kerala. He was appointed the club's captain on 20 March 2026, after the previous captain Nili, got ruled out due to an injury.
