= Antonio Moyano (footballer, born 2000) =

Spanish footballer (born 2000)

Personal information
- Full name: Antonio Moyano Carrasquilla
- Date of birth: 13 July 2000 (age 26)
- Place of birth: Montilla, Spain
- Height: 1.78 m (5 ft 10 in)
- Position: Attacking midfielder

Team information
- Current team: NorthEast United
- Number: 8

Youth career
- 2009–2019: Córdoba

Senior career*
Years	Team	Apps	(Gls)
2018–2021	Córdoba B	75	(9)
2019–2020	Córdoba	12	(0)
2021–2023	Alcorcón	55	(3)
2023–2024	Sabadell	25	(4)
2024–2025	Fuenlabrada	34	(4)
2026	Diamond Harbour	12	(5)
2026–	NorthEast United	5	(1)
- * Club domestic league appearances and goals as of 5 November 2026

Antonio Moyano Carrasquilla (born 13 July 2000) is a Spanish professional footballer who plays as a midfielder for Indian Super League club NorthEast United.

== Club career ==
Born in Montilla, Córdoba, Andalusia, Moyano represented Córdoba CF as a youth. On 4 November 2016, aged only 16, he signed his first professional contract with the club.

Moyano made his senior debut with the reserves on 16 September 2018, starting in a 2–1 Tercera División away win against Sevilla FC C. He scored his first goals on 14 October, netting a hat-trick in a 4–2 home defeat of UB Lebrijana.

Moyano made his professional debut on 31 May 2019, coming on as a second-half substitute for Yann Bodiger in a 2–3 home loss against CA Osasuna, as his side was already relegated. On 20 June, he signed a new two-year contract with the club.

In July 2021, Moyano signed for AD Alcorcón; initially assigned to the B-team in Tercera División RFEF, he impressed first team manager Juan Antonio Anquela during the pre-season and was assigned to the main squad.

On 23 August 2024, Moyano joined Fuenlabrada on a one-season deal.
