= Benjamin Kuku =

Nigerian footballer

Personal information
- Full name: Benjamin Thomas Kuku
- Date of birth: 8 March 1995 (age 31)
- Place of birth: Jos, Nigeria
- Height: 1.88 m (6 ft 2 in)
- Position: Striker

Team information
- Current team: Gokulam Kerala
- Number: 18

Senior career*
| Years | Team | Apps | (Gls) |
| 2014–2015 | Zalău | 16 | (8) |
| 2015–2017 | Târgu Mureș | 20 | (2) |
| 2015–2016 | → Academica Clinceni | 28 | (7) |
| 2017 | Botoșani | 21 | (2) |
| 2018 | Sepsi OSK | 12 | (1) |
| 2018–2020 | Hapoel Kfar Saba | 57 | (15) |
| 2020 | → Hapoel Petah Tikva | 15 | (5) |
| 2020 | F.C. Kafr Qasim | 2 | (0) |
| 2020–2021 | Hapoel Ra'anana | 18 | (4) |
| 2021 | Hapoel Ramat HaSharon | 16 | (3) |
| 2021–2022 | Maccabi Bnei Reineh | 37 | (8) |
| 2022–2023 | Maccabi Akhi Nazareth | 35 | (6) |
| 2023 | Sektzia Ness Ziona | 1 | (0) |
| 2023–2024 | Hapoel Kfar Saba | 23 | (6) |
| 2024–2025 | Song Lam Nghe An | 26 | (6) |
| 2026– | Gokulam Kerala | 0 | (0) |
- * Club domestic league appearances and goals as of 01 April 2026

Benjamin Thomas Kuku (born 8 March 1995) is a Nigerian professional footballer who plays as a striker for Indian Football League club Gokulam Kerala.

== Career ==
Born in Jos, Nigeria, Kuku began his career in Romania, where he stayed for four years before moving to play in Israel, where he passed through 8 clubs in five years. In 2024, he moved to Vietnam, signing for Song Lam Nghe An.
