= Amid Arezou =

Afghan footballer

Personal information
- Date of birth: 17 February 1996 (age 30)
- Height: 1.90 m (6 ft 3 in)
- Position: Centre-back

Team information
- Current team: Rundtom FK
- Number: 26

Youth career
- –2012: IK Grane
- 2013: Arendal

Senior career*
Years	Team	Apps	(Gls)
2014–2015	Arendal 2		
2016	Moss 2		
2016	Arendal	7	(0)
2017–2018	Express	21	(2)
2018–2019	IK Grane	8	(11)
2019–2021	IF Trauma	9	(2)
2021	Hisøy IL	4	(0)
2022	IK Grane	0	(0)
2022	IF Trauma	14	(2)
2022–2024	IK Grane		
2024	IF Trauma	0	(0)
2024–2025	Vindbjart	21	(0)
2025–2026	Arendal	9	(0)
2026	Gokulam Kerala	4	(0)
2026-	Rundtom FK	0	(0)

International career^{‡}
2024–	Afghanistan	7	(0)
- * Club domestic league appearances and goals as of 20 March 2026 ‡ National team caps and goals as of 3 November 2025

Amid Arezou (Dari: حمید آرزو; born 17 February 1996) is an Afghan football player who plays as a centre-back for Norwegian 5. division club Rundtom and the Afghanistan national team.

== Career ==
=== Arendal ===
On 11 July 2025, Arezou joined Arendal. He spend some of his youth years at the club.

=== Gokulam Kerala ===
Arezou joined Gokulam Kerala on 10 January 2026. The contract was terminated after a short spell in March 2026.

== International career ==
Arezou made his debut for the Afghanistan national team on 6 June 2024 in a World Cup qualifier against Qatar at the Prince Abdullah bin Jalawi Stadium in Saudi Arabia. He started the game and played for an hour, as the game ended in a scoreless draw.

== Personal life ==
Hamid is a younger brother of formen Afghan international Belal Arezou.
