= Shibinraj Kunniyil =

Indian footballer (born 1993)

Shibin Raj
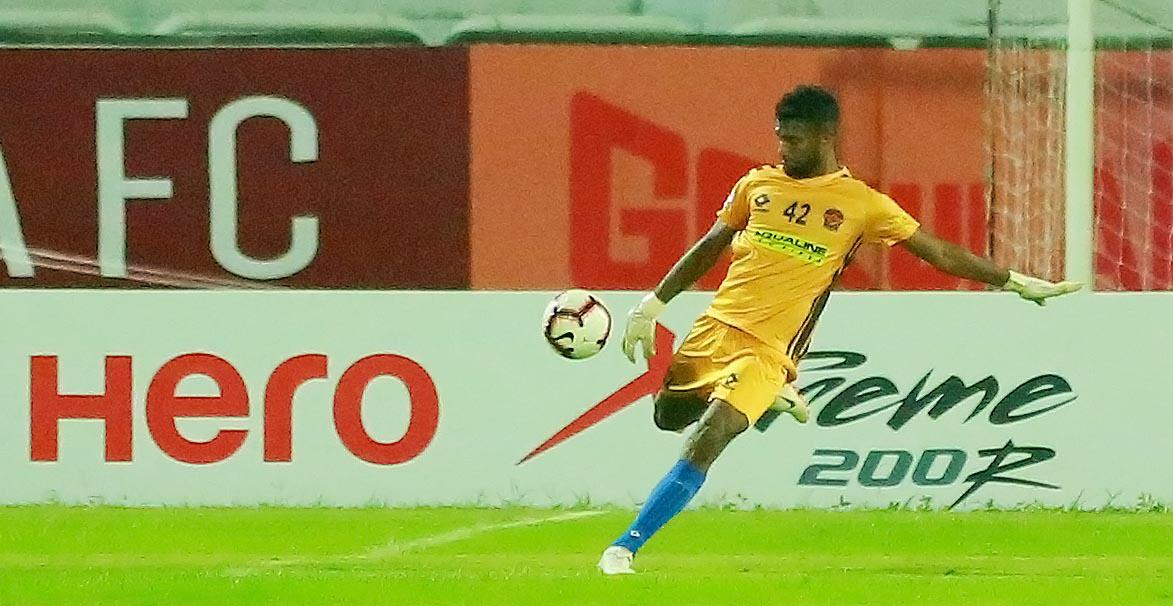
- Shibin with Gokulam Kerala in 2019

Personal information
- Full name: Shibin Raj Kunniyil
- Date of birth: 20 March 1993 (age 33)
- Place of birth: Kozhikode, Kerala, India
- Height: 1.81 m (5 ft 11 1/2 in)
- Position: Goalkeeper

Team information
- Current team: Gokulam Kerala
- Number: 42

Youth career
- 2005–2010: SAI Thiruvananthapuram

Senior career*
Years	Team	Apps	(Gls)
2016–2018	Mohun Bagan	2	(0)
2018–2019	Gokulam Kerala	10	(0)
2019–2020	Kerala Blasters	0	(0)
2020–2021	Churchill Brothers	8	(0)
2021–2022	Sreenidi Deccan	9	(0)
2022–2023	Gokulam Kerala	19	(0)
2023–2024	Punjab	0	(0)
2024–	Gokulam Kerala	20	(0)

International career
2010	India U19	0	(0)
- * Club domestic league appearances and goals as of 16:22, 20 March 2026 (UTC)

Shibinraj Kunniyil (born 20 March 1993) is an Indian professional footballer who plays as a goalkeeper and is the captain of Indian Football League club Gokulam Kerala.

== Early career ==
Shibinraj was included in a 23-day preparatory camp for India U19 national team held in China in the year of 2010.

== Career ==
=== Mohun Bagan ===
On 20 April 2017, Shibinraj made his debut for Mohun Bagan in the AFC Cup match against Maziya S&RC. Mohun Bagan went down by one goal in that match.

On 30 April 2017, Shibinraj made his I-League debut when he came in as substitute for Debjit Majumder in a match against Chennai City FC in the 82nd minute of the match.

On 5 August 2017 Mohun Bagan Announced that they have retained the services of Shibinraj for 2017-18 Season. Shibinraj started for Mohun Bagan in CFL and Sikkim Governors Gold Cup. He also started against FC Goa in a Pre-Season Friendly took place at the Jawaharlal Nehru stadium in Goa.

=== Gokulam Kerala FC ===
Gokulam Kerala FC signed Shibinraj for the 2018–19 season and he had his opening game against his former club Mohun Baganin the I-League on 27 October at EMS Corporation Stadium in Kozhikode;Gokulam Kerala FC drew the match and Shibinraj was applauded for his efforts in front of goal. He kept his first team place and played in the other matches also for Gokulam Kerala FC

=== Kerala Blasters FC ===
Kerala Blasters FC signed Shibinraj for the 2019–20 season as the third goalkeeper for the club. But he not feature in a single game for the club in the senior team. On 25 September 2020, Kerala Blasters FC released Shibinraj as his contract came to an end.
