= Gokulam Kerala FC =

Indian association football club based in Malappuram

- Full name: Gokulam Kerala Football Club
- Nickname: Malabarians
- Short name: GKFC
- Founded: January 2017; 9 years ago (as Gokulam FC)
- Ground: EMS Stadium; Malappuram District Sports Complex Stadium
- Capacity: 50,000; 30,000
- Owner: Sree Gokulam Group
- President: V. C. Praveen
- Head coach: Carlos Eduardo Parreira
- League: Indian Football League
- 2025–26: Indian Football League, 9th of 10
- Website: gokulamkeralafc.com
Home colours	Away colours	Third colours

Gokulam Kerala Football Club is an Indian professional football club based in Kozhikode, Kerala. Founded in 2017, the club competes in the Indian Football League, the second tier of the Indian football league system. They won the 2020–21 I-League title to become the first club from Kerala to do so, and became the first team to defend the league title in 2021–22. Gokulam is also the first club from the state to qualify for a continental competition, the AFC Cup, in 2022.

Nicknamed Malabarians, Gokulam Kerala represents the state of Kerala, predominantly its Malabar region. Affiliated with the Kerala Football Association (KFA), club's reserve team competes in the Kerala Premier League. They also won the 129th edition of the Durand Cup, becoming the second side from Kerala to win that competition. The women's section of the club participates in the Indian Women's League.

== History ==
=== Formation and early years (2017–2020) ===
Gokulam Kerala was founded in January 2017 at Malappuram. The club then went on to participate in Awes Cup in Goa, in which they finished the campaign as runners-up. On 20 September, after the second round of bidding invitations, the bid evaluation committee decided to award Sree Gokulam Group the right to field their team in the Hero I-League 2017–18 season onwards from Calicut, Kerala. Although the club did not have a good beginning, they went on to defeat clubs like East Bengal, Mohun Bagan and Minerva Punjab by the end of the season. Gokulam Kerala hired Spaniard Fernando Santiago Varela as head coach in March 2018.

On 15 March 2018, Gokulam played the Super Cup qualifiers against North East United FC and was qualified with a 2-goal victory. In the pre-quarterfinals of the Super Cup on 1 April 2018, they were leading against Bengaluru by 0–1 until 60 minutes with a goal scored by the striker Henry Kisekka but Bengaluru scored a stoppage time goal which led to a defeat of 2–1. Gokulam in 2019, for the first time went abroad and participated at the 2019 Sheikh Kamal International Club Cup in Bangladesh, where they qualified for the Semi-finals after finishing 2nd in Group B. Gokulam finished as semifinalist after losing 3–2 to Chittagong Abahani. Gokulam Kerala won their maiden title under the coaching of Fernando Santiago Varela, the 129th edition of the Durand Cup on 24 August 2019, defeating Mohun Bagan 2–1 in Kolkata.

=== 2020–present ===
Gokulam Kerala won the 2020–21 I-League by defeating TRAU FC in the final game. With 29 points from 15 games, they qualified for the 2022 AFC Cup group stage. In April 2021, Gokulam Kerala emerged as the champions of the 2020–21 Kerala Premier League, defeating KSEB FC 2–1 at the Thrissur Municipal Corporation Stadium. They began their 2021–22 I-League season on 26 December with 1–0 win against Churchill Brothers. They later thrashed Real Kashmir by 5–1. After back to back wins in both the group and championship stages, the club clinched I-League title again in 2021–22 season, defeating Mohammedan Sporting 2–1 in the final game at the Salt Lake Stadium on 14 May, and became the first club in fifteen years to defend a national league title.

At the 2022 AFC Cup group-stage opener, the club achieved a historic 4–2 win against Indian Super League side ATK Mohun Bagan. Later, they were defeated 1–0 by Maldivian side Maziya S&RC, 1–2 by Bangladeshi side Bashundhara Kings respectively, and knocked out of the tournament. On 5 July, the club officially announced that they roped in former Cameroonian international Richard Towa as new head coach. Due to not maintaining good form in league marches, the club parted ways with Towa and roped in Spanish manager Francesc Bonet in place of him.

In April 2023, the club took part in 3rd edition of Indian Super Cup. In the 2023–24 I-League season, the club's Spanish striker Álex Sánchez emerged as the top goalscorer with 19 goals. On 18 April, the club roped in Antonio Rueda Fernández as new head coach. In November 2024, the club took part in the 2024 edition of Sikkim Gold Cup, in which they defeated Bhutanese side Transport United by 2–1 in the quarter-finals.The club was featured in the 40th edition of the Sikkim Gold Cup. In the 2024–25 season, Gokulam Kerala falter at final hurdle against Dempo (a 3–4 defeat) to win the I-League title on the final day, thus failed to secure promotion to the Indian Super League.

== Stadiums ==
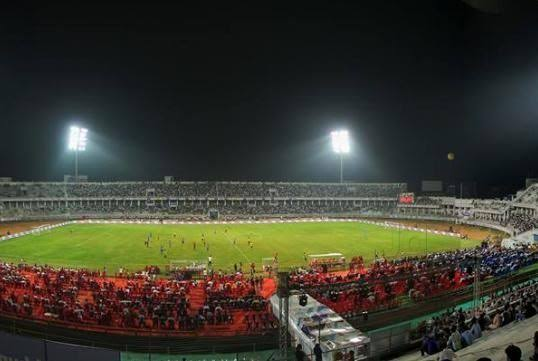
Fans of Gokulam Kerala at the EMS Stadium during an I-League match in 2017

EMS Stadium, located in the heart of Calicut, is used as home ground of Gokulam Kerala. West stand is the largest block that can accommodate most spectators, while the capacity of the stadium is limited to 50,000.

The club also used Kottappadi Stadium in Malappuram for training purposes. Malappuram District Sports Complex Stadium previously served as club's home venue for matches of Kerala Premier League. In May 2023, Kozhikode Municipal Corporation decided not to renew the contract for matches at the EMS Stadium.

== Supporters ==
Kerala is a state known for its football fans. Football in Northern Kerala (known as Malabar Coastal Region) has been described as having one of the most passionate fanbase in the state. GKFC Battalia is one of the supporters' group of Gokulam Kerala FC. Another noted supporters' group of the club named GKFC Ultras is also in existence.

== Rivalry ==
=== Rivalry with Kolkata clubs ===
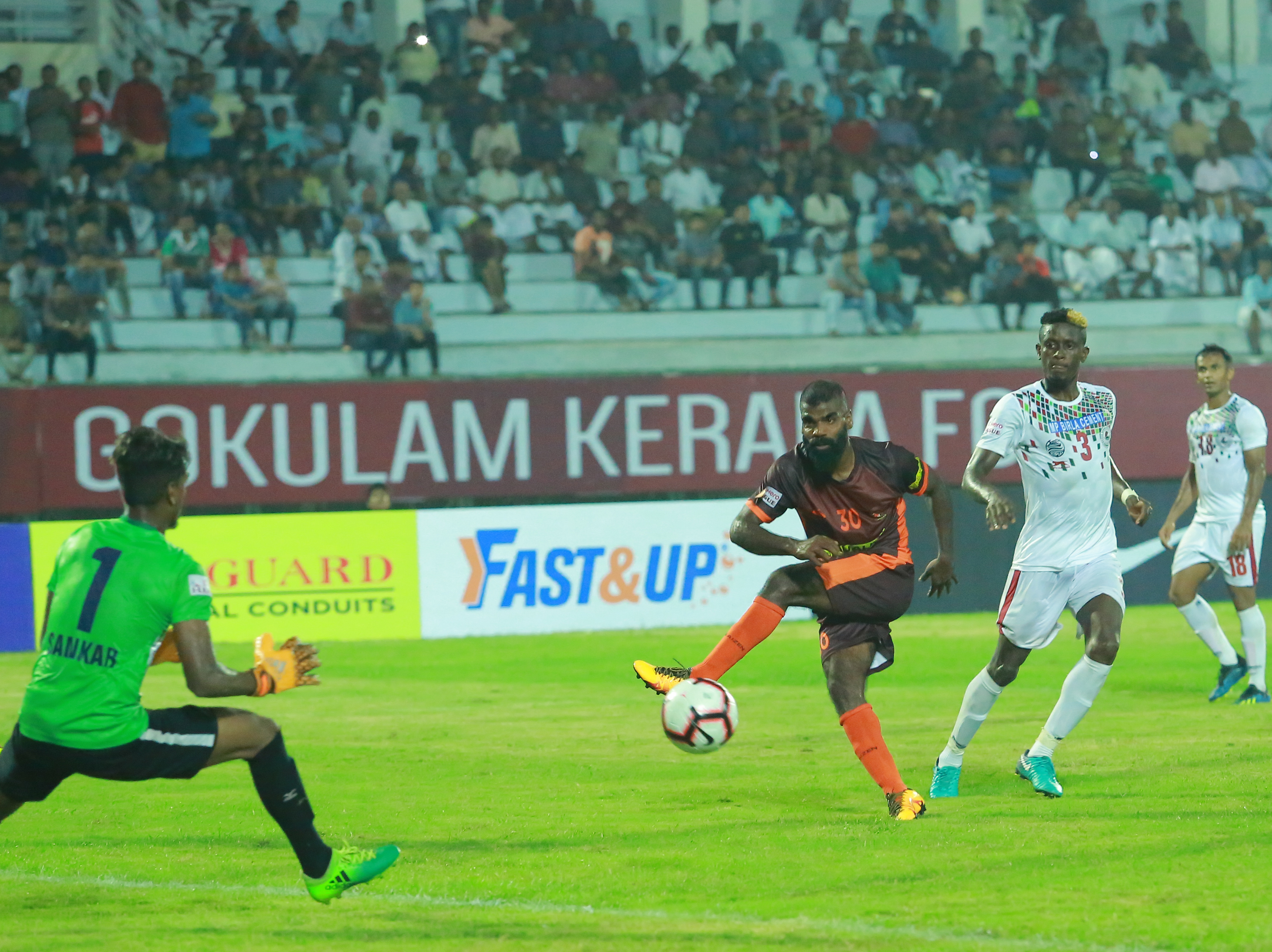
An I-League encounter between Gokulam Kerala and Mohun Bagan at the EMS Stadium in 2019

Gokulam Kerala is known for pathbreaking the Kolkata clubs, Mohun Bagan, East Bengal and Mohammedan in some major matches in I-League and Durand Cup. Gokulam Kerala won the 2019 Durand Cup by defeating East Bengal in the semi-final and Mohun Bagan in the final. They also defeated Mohammedan in the deciding last match of 2021–22 I-League to clinch their consecutive league title. Both the states, Kerala and West Bengal, are two dominant powerhouses of Indian Football.

=== Rivalry with Kerala United ===
Gokulam Kerala enjoys an on-field rivalry with another Kozhikode based side Kerala United (previously Quartz Calicut). The first match between the two teams took place in the group stage of 2017–18 Kerala Premier League, where Quartz Calicut were winners.

After the purchase of Kerala united FC by the owners of Sheffield United, the first match took place in 2020–21 Kerala Premier League semifinal. The match ended goalless and Gokulam won 4–2 on penalties.

==== Results ====
Date	Competition	Venue	Score	Kerala United FC scorers	Gokulam Kerala scorers	Attendance
19 April 2021	2020–21 Kerala Premier League	Maharaja's College Stadium, Ernakulam	0–0			
3 June 2018	2017–18 Kerala Premier League	Municipal Corporation Stadium, Thrissur	0–2		Brian Umony, Arjun Jayaraj	
10 May 2018	2017–18 Kerala Premier League	EMS Stadium, Calicut	0–2		Mohamed Salah, Usman Ashik	
25 April 2018	2017–18 Kerala Premier League	EMS Stadium, Calicut	3–2	Emmanuel Aidoo	Sushanth Mathew, Mama	

=== Rivalry with Kerala Blasters ===
For the first time in history, Gokulam Kerala faced Kerala Blasters in the "Kerala Derby" at group stage of the 132nd edition of Durand Cup on 13 August 2023, in which they defeated the ISL side by 4–3.

== Crest, colours & kits ==
=== Crest ===
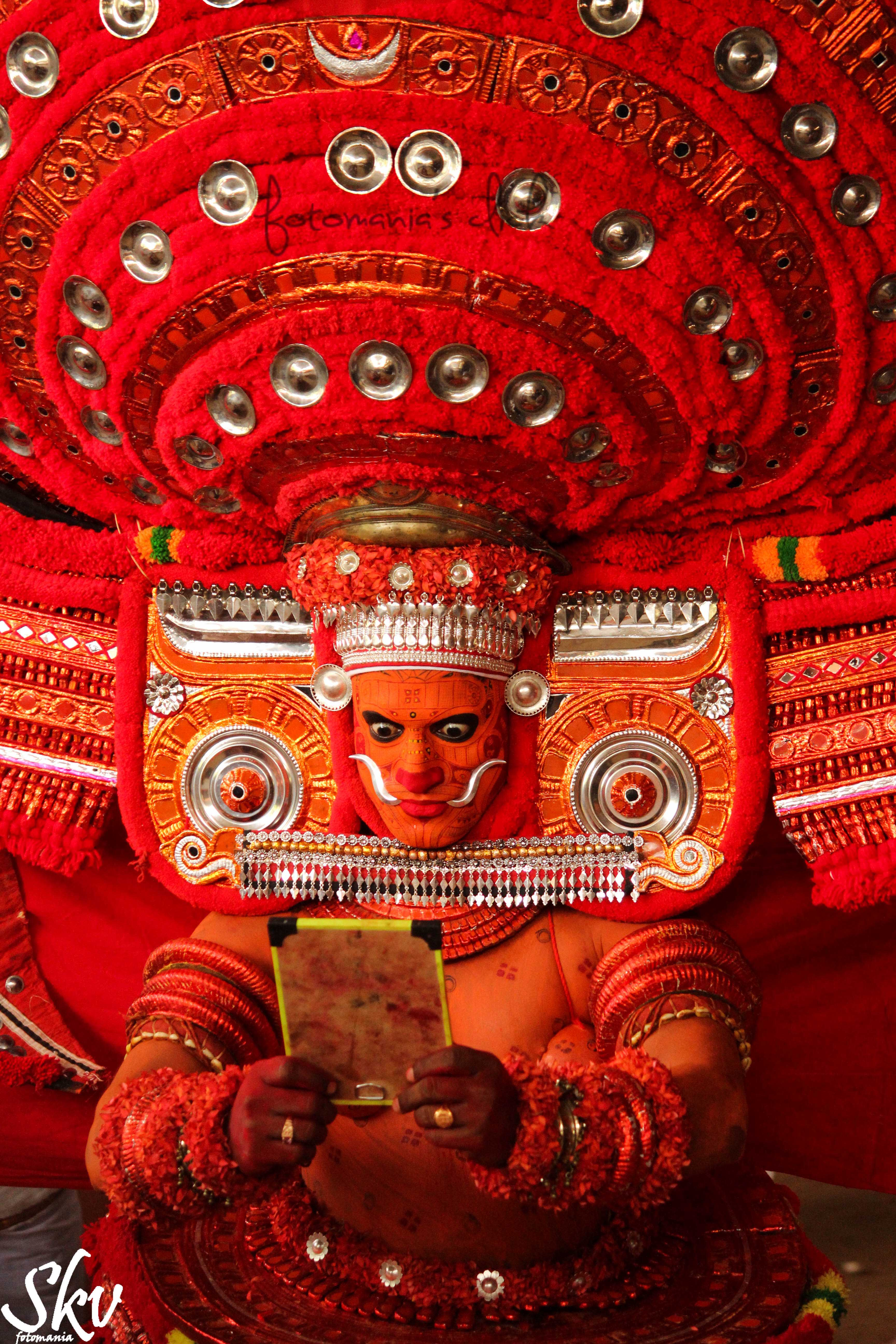
Theyyam is a popular ritual form of worship in North Kerala

The club crest incorporates elements from historical Theyyam, a famous ritual art form that originated in northern Kerala. It encompasses dance, mime and music. The crest was unveiled in January 2017, by chief minister Pinarayi Vijayan and football legend I. M. Vijayan.

=== Kit evolution ===
2017–2018	2018–2019	2019–2020	2020–2021	2021–2022

=== Kit manufacturers and shirt sponsors ===
Period	Kit manufacturer	Main sponsor	Back sponsor	Chest sponsor	Sleeve sponsor
2017–2018	Kaizen Sports	Aachi Group			
2018–2019	Kaizen Sports	Aqualine PVC Pipes			
2019–2020	Kaizen Sports	Sree Gokulam Group	CSB Bank	Gokulam	Gokulam Madinah
2020–2021	SEGA	Sree Gokulam Group	CSB Bank	Gokulam	Federal Bank
2021–2023	SEGA	CSB Bank	Sree Gokulam Group	Federal Bank	Multiple
2023–2024	Do's	CSB Bank	Sree Gokulam Group	Federal Bank	Multiple
2024–2026	Vector X	CSB Bank	Sree Gokulam Group	Federal Bank	Multiple
2026–	MS Sportswear	Bandhan Bank	Sree Gokulam Group	Federal Bank	Multiple

== Management ==
Role	Name
Chairman	(India) Gokulam Gopalan
President	(India) VC Praveen
Technical Director	(India) Derrick Pereira
Sporting Director	(India) Raman Vijayan
IT Head	(India) Nidhin Raj VM

== Technical staff ==
Role	Name
Head coach	(Brazil) Carlos Eduardo Parreira
Assistant coach	(India) Micky Fernandes
Goalkeeping coach	(India) Sandip Nandy
Strength and conditioning coach	(Brazil) Djair Miranda Garcia
Physiotherapist	(India) Soumyabrata Dev Roy
Physiotherapist	(India) Ajmal Shafi
Team manager	(India) Martin Stanislas
Masseur	(India) Sreerag
Media manager	(India) Muhammad Sufail
Kit manager	(India) Midhun A
Analyst	(India) Rohan Waghmare

== Players ==
=== First-team squad ===
As of 06 October 2026

Note: Flags indicate national team as defined under FIFA eligibility rules; some limited exceptions apply. Players may hold more than one non-FIFA nationality.

No.	Pos.	Nation	Player
1	GK	IND	Jaspreet Singh
3	DF	IND	Harpreet Singh
4	DF	ESP	Mikel Kortazar
5	DF	IND	Naresh Singh Yendrembam
7	MF	BRA	Victor
11	MF	IND	Lalbiakliana Renthlei
12	DF	IND	Johnson Singh Laishram
13	FW	GHA	Denny Antwi
14	DF	IND	Wungngayam Muirang
16	GK	IND	Ravi Kumar
17	MF	IND	Lalchungnunga Chhangte
18	MF	IND	Ayush Adhikari
19	FW	IND	Makan Chothe
20	FW	BRA	Crislan
21	FW	IND	Seilenthang Lotjem
22	FW	IND	Joby Justin

No.	Pos.	Nation	Player
24	DF	IND	Tejas Praveen
27	DF	IND	Sachu Siby
28	MF	IND	Germanpreet Singh
30	MF	IND	Shighil Nambrath (captain)
31	MF	IND	Lalramsanga Tlaichhun
33	DF	IND	Gursimrat Singh
42	GK	IND	Shibinraj Kunniyil
43	DF	IND	Soyal Joshy
70	DF	IND	Sarthak Golui
72	DF	IND	Muhammed Rafi
77	MF	IND	Gyamar Nikum
—	DF	BRA	Raniel

=== Other players under contract ===
Note: Flags indicate national team as defined under FIFA eligibility rules; some limited exceptions apply. Players may hold more than one non-FIFA nationality.

No.	Pos.	Nation	Player
—	MF	IND	Shubham Dixit
—	MF	POR	João Rodrigues
—	MF	ESP	Hugo Díaz

No.	Pos.	Nation	Player
—	FW	IND	Komal Thatal
—	MF	IND	Ashis Pradhan

== Notable players ==
The following Gokulam Kerala players have been capped at full international level. Years in brackets indicate their spells at the club.

- (Democratic Republic of the Congo) Lelo Mbele (2017)
- (Bahrain) Mahmood Al-Ajmi (2017–2018)
- (Uganda) Musa Mudde (2017–2018)
- (Cameroon) Francis Ambané (2017–2018)
- (Afghanistan) Faysal Shayesteh (2017–2018)
- (Ghana) Jonathan Quartey (2018)
- (Uganda) Brian Umony (2018)
- (Grenada) Antonio German (2018–2019)
- (Haiti) Fabien Vorbe (2018–2019)
- (Uganda) Henry Kisekka (2018–2020)
- (Trinidad and Tobago) Andre Ettienne (2018–2020)
- (Trinidad and Tobago) Marcus Joseph (2018–2020)
- (Trinidad and Tobago) Nathaniel García (2019–2020)
- (Afghanistan) Zohib Islam Amiri (2019–2020)
- (Rwanda) Atuheire Kipson (2020)
- (Mali) Saliou Guindo (2020)
- (Ghana) Mohamed Awal (2020–2021)
- (Afghanistan) Sharif Mukhammad (2020–2022)
- (Nigeria) Chisom Chikatara (2021–2022)
- (Cameroon) Aminou Bouba (2021–2024, 2026)
- (Jamaica) Jourdaine Fletcher (2022)
- (Sierra Leone) David Simbo (2022)
- (Sri Lanka) Ahmed Waseem Razeek (2022)
- (Afghanistan) Farshad Noor (2022–2023)
- (Kyrgyzstan) Eldar Moldozhunusov (2023)
- (Tajikistan) Komron Tursunov (2023–2024)
- (Uganda) Lumala Abdu (2024–2025)
- (Mali) Adama Niane (2024–2025)
- (Lesotho) Thabiso Brown (2025–2026)
- (Afghanistan) Amid Arezou (2026)

== Managerial history ==
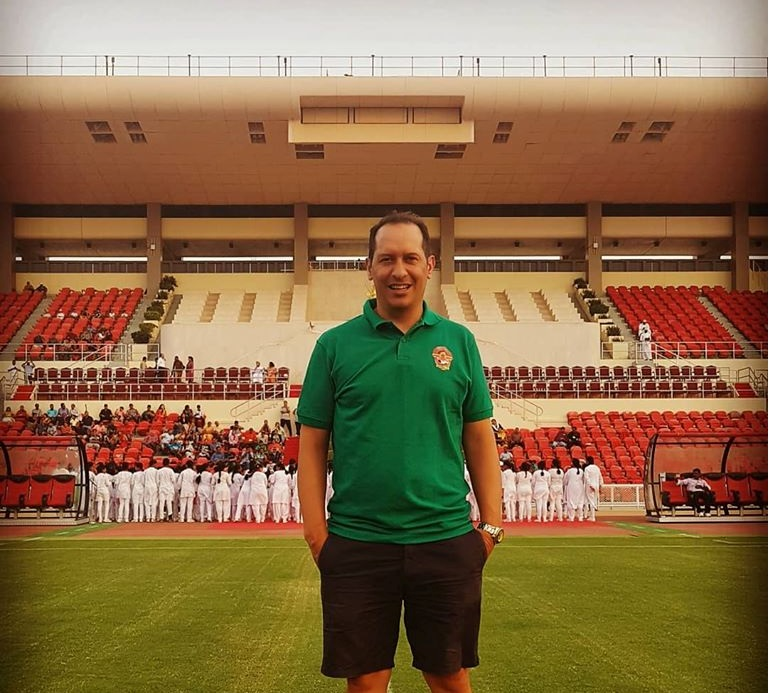
Fernando Santiago Varela gave Gokulam Kerala their first major title, Durand Cup in 2019.

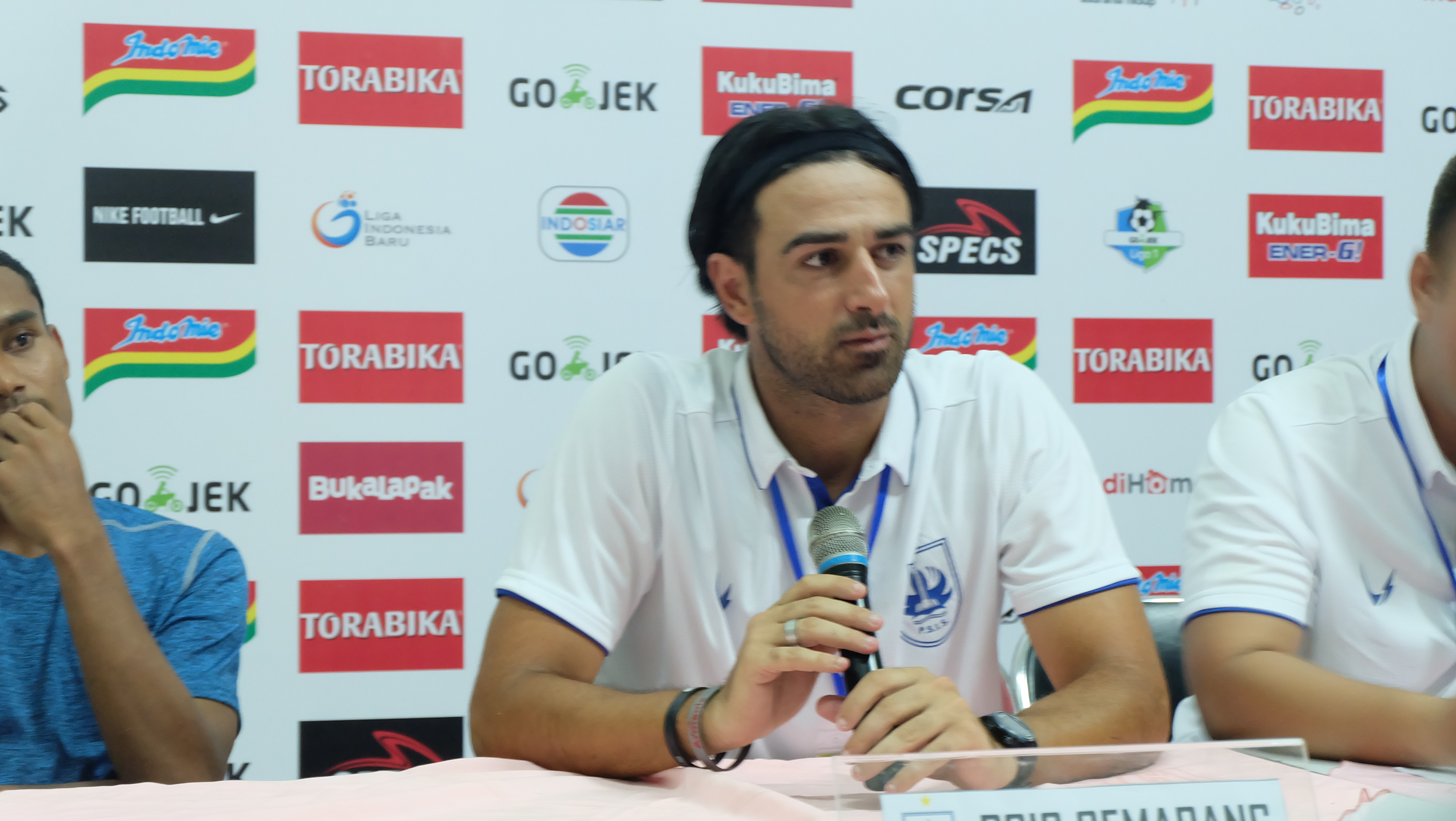
Vincenzo Alberto Annese, Most successful head coach of Gokulam Kerala. He had won two I-League titles consecutively in two seasons, 2020–21 and 2021–22.

=== Head coach's record ===
As of 18 April 2026

Name	Nationality	From	To	P	W	D	L	GF	GA	Win%	Ref.
Bino George	India	8 October 2017	26 February 2019	40	10	11	19	45	58	25.00	
Gift Raikhan	India	26 February 2019	1 July 2019	3	1	0	2	4	6	33.33	
Fernando Santiago Varela	Spain	1 July 2019	16 June 2020	20	11	4	5	25	10	55.00	
Vincenzo Alberto Annese	Italy	19 August 2020	1 June 2022	40	25	7	8	90	42	62.50	
Richard Towa	Cameroon	5 July 2022	22 December 2022	9	4	3	2	7	3	44.44	
Francesc Bonet	Spain	27 December 2022	31 May 2023	16	8	0	8	27	24	50.00	
Domingo Oramas	Spain	June 2023	31 March 2024	29	12	7	10	54	44	41.38	
Shareef Khan (interim coach)	India	31 March 2024	18 April 2024	2	2	0	0	9	1	100.00	
Antonio Rueda Fernández	Spain	18 April 2024	15 February 2025	14	5	4	5	22	15	35.71	
Ranjith Thittayil Ajithkumar (interim coach)	India	15 February 2025	5 June 2025	9	6	0	3	23	17	66.67	
José Hevia	Spain	6 June 2025	10 January 2026	5	1	0	4	4	13	20.00	
Derrick Pereira	India	10 January 2026	7 March 2026	2	0	2	0	1	1	0.00	
Dimitris Dimitriou	Cyprus	6 March 2026	20 April 2026	7	2	0	5	10	16	28.57	

== Statistics and records ==
=== Season statistics ===
As of 21 April 2025

Season	Div.	Pos.	Pl.	W	D	L	GF	GA	Pts.	Super Cup	Durand Cup	AFC Cup
2017–18	I-League	7	18	6	3	9	17	23	21	Round of 16	–	–
2018–19	I-League	10	20	3	8	9	25	33	17	DNP	–	DNQ
2019–20	I-League	5	15	6	4	5	20	19	22	Cancelled (Note: Due to the COVID-19 pandemic lockdown the I-League matches were cancelled after 14 March 2020, and Gokulam Kerala were positioned 5th in the points table after 15 match. The Super Cup wasn't also held for the lockdown and Durand Cup was promoted to the de facto league cup.)	Champions	DNQ
2020–21	I-League	1	15	9	2	4	31	17	29	Cancelled (Note: Due to a busy schedule of the India national football team, the Super Cup was cancelled.)	Cancelled (Note: Due to COVID-19 pandemic 2020–21 Durand Cup season cancelled.)	DNQ
2021–22	I-League	1	18	13	4	1	44	15	43	Cancelled	Quarter-finals	Group Stage
2022–23	I-League	3	22	12	3	7	26	14	39	Group Stage	DNP	DNQ
2023–24	I-League	3	24	12	6	6	55	34	42	Group Stage	Quarter-finals	DNQ
2024–25	I-League	4	22	11	4	7	45	29	37	R16	DNP	DNQ

=== Most appearances ===
As of 07 April 2026

Name	Period	I-League	Super Cup	Durand Cup	IFA Shield	Others	AFC Cup	Appearances
(Cameroon) Aminou Bouba	2021-2024,2026	57	07	08	05	01 (Note: play–offs for AFC Cup)	03	81
(India) Sreekuttan VS	2021–2024	56	07	04	00	01	03	71
(India) Rishad PP	2021–2026	51	05	04	05	00	03	68
(India) Shibinraj Kunniyil	2018–2019,2022–2023,2024–	50	06	00	01	01	00	59
(India) Nidhin Krishna	2023–	46	05	02	02	00	00	55
(India) Thahir Zaman	2021–2023	43	04	00	03	01	03	54
(India) Noufal PN	2022–2024	42	06	04	00	01	00	53
(India) Abhijith Kurungodan	2021–2025	39	04	05	04	00	00	53
(India) Emil Benny	2020–2022,2024–2026	37	02	03	07	00	03	52
(India) Muhammed Rashid	2017–2022	35	01	05	03	04 (Note: Sheikh Kamal Cup)	00	48

=== Club captains ===
Period	Name
2017–2018	(India) Sushanth Mathew
2018–2019	(Uganda) Musa Mudde
2019	(Ghana) Daniel Addo
2019–2020	(Trinidad and Tobago) Marcus Joseph
2020–2021	(Ghana) Mohamed Awal
2021–2022	(Afghanistan) Sharif Mukhammad
2022–2023	(Cameroon) Aminou Bouba
2023–2024	(Spain) Álex Sánchez
2024–2025	(Spain) Sergio Llamas

=== Top scorers ===
As of 31 March 2026

Still active team players are highlighted

Top scorers record
#	Player	Career	I-League	Super Cup	Durand Cup	IFA Shield	Sheikh Kamal Cup	AFC Cup	Total
1	(Trinidad and Tobago) Marcus Joseph	2019–2020	14	0	11	0	1	0	26
2	(Spain) Álex Sánchez	2023–2024	19	1	0	0	0	0	20
3	(Uganda) Henry Kisekka	2017–2018, 2019–2020	9	3	1	0	3	0	16
4	(Ghana) Denny Antwi	2020–2021	11	0	0	4	0	0	15
5	(Slovenia) Luka Majcen	2022	13	0	0	0	0	2	15
6	(Lesotho) Thabiso Brown	2025-2026	13	0	0	0	0	0	13
7	(Jamaica) Jourdaine Fletcher	2022	9	0	0	0	0	1	10

=== Wins against foreign teams ===
Competition	Round	Year	Opposition	Score	Venue	City	Ref
Sheikh Kamal International Club Cup	Group stage	2019	(Bangladesh) Bashundhara Kings	3–1	M. A. Aziz Stadium	Chittagong	
Sikkim Governor's Gold Cup	Quarter-final	2024	(Bhutan) Transport United	2–1	Paljor Stadium	Gangtok	

== Honours ==
=== Domestic ===
League

- I-League
  - Champions (2): 2020–21, 2021–22
  - Third place (2): 2022–23, 2023–24
- Kerala Premier League
  - Champions (2): 2017–18, 2020–21
  - Runners-up (3): 2018–19, 2019–20, 2022–23
- Kerala State Club Championship
  - Runners-up (1): 2016–17

Cup

- Durand Cup
  - Champions (1): 2019
- Bodousa Cup
  - Champions (1): 2019
- Independence Day Cup
  - Champions (1): 2019
- Ladakh Climate Cup
  - Champions (1): 2024
- AWES Cup
  - Runners-up (1): 2017
- Thiruvananthapuram Mayor's Cup
  - Runners-up (1): 2019

Youth

- Subroto Cup (junior)
  - Champions (1): 2025 (as Farook HSS, Kozhikode)

=== Invitational ===
- Sheikh Kamal International Club Cup
  - Third place (1): 2019

== Performance in AFC competitions ==
- AFC Cup: 1 appearance

2022: Group Stage

Season	Competition	Round	Club	Score	Position	Top scorer	Source
2022	AFC Cup	Group D	(India) ATK Mohun Bagan	4–2	4th in Group stage	(Slovenia) Luka Majcen (2 goals)	
2022	AFC Cup	Group D	(Maldives) Maziya S&RC	0–1	4th in Group stage	(Slovenia) Luka Majcen (2 goals)	
2022	AFC Cup	Group D	(Bangladesh) Bashundhara Kings	1–2	4th in Group stage	(Slovenia) Luka Majcen (2 goals)	

== Affiliated clubs ==
The following clubs are affiliated with Gokulam Kerala FC:

- (India) Viva Chennai FC (2018–present)

== See also ==
- List of football clubs in Kerala
- Football in Kerala
