= List of Gokulam Kerala FC records and statistics =

Gokulam Kerala FC is an Indian professional football club based in Kozhikode, Kerala. The club was founded in January 2017 as Gokulam FC and started to compete in I-League, the top division of club football system in India, from 2017–18 season.

== Title & honours ==
Competition	year	Captain	Coach
Durand Cup	2019	(Trinidad and Tobago) Marcus Joseph	(Spain) Fernando Santiago Varela
I-League	2020–21	(Ghana) Mohamed Awal	(Italy) Vincenzo Alberto Annese
I-League	2021–22	(Afghanistan) Sharif Mukhammad	(Italy) Vincenzo Alberto Annese

== General ==
Records and statistics of only official matches are counted. This include matches played in I-League and Indian Super Cup. Friendlies are unofficial matches, and therefore aren't counted.

- First match: 1-0 loss (away to Shillong Lajong, I-League, 27 November 2017)
- First win: 0-2 (away to Indian Arrows, I-League, 22 December 2017)
- First goalscorer: Kamo Stephane Bayi
- First Indian goalscorer: Santu Singh

=== All time record ===
As of 31 March 2026

Competition	MP	Won	Draw	Lost	GF	GA
I-League	160	73	37	50	270	189
Super Cup	12	3	1	8	15	25
Durand Cup	13	8	2	3	31	14
Sheikh Kamal Cup	4	2	1	1	7	4
IFA Shield	9	3	2	4	21	15
AFC Cup	3	1	0	2	5	5
play–offs for AFC Cup	1	0	0	1	1	3
Total	202	88	42	70	350	256

== Appearances ==
As of 6 April 2025

- Most appearances in all competitions: 75 – (Cameroon) Aminou Bouba
- Most appearances in I-League: 56 (India) Sreekuttan VS
- Most appearances in Indian Super Cup: 7 – Aminou Bouba, Sreekuttan VS, Sourav K
- Most appearances in Durand Cup: 8 – (Cameroon) Aminou Bouba
- Most appearances in IFA Shield: 8 – (India) Ngangom Ronald Singh
- Longest Serving Player: From 2017 –2022 (India) Muhammed Rashid

=== Most appearances ===
As of 26 March 2026

Name	Period	I-League	Super Cup	Durand Cup	IFA Shield	Others	AFC Cup	Appearances
(Cameroon) Aminou Bouba	2021-2024	51	07	08	05	01 (Note: play–offs for AFC Cup)	03	75
(India) Sreekuttan VS	2021–2024	56	07	04	00	01	03	71
(India) Rishad PP	2021–	50	06	04	04	00	03	67
(India) Shibinraj Kunniyil	2018–2019, 2022-2023, 2024-	49	07	00	01	01	00	58
(India) Thahir Zaman	2021–2023	43	04	00	03	01	03	54
(India) Noufal PN	2022-2024	42	06	04	00	01	00	53
(India) Abhijith Kurungodan	2021–2025	39	04	05	04	00	00	53
(India) Emil Benny	2020-2022, 2024-	37	03	03	06	00	04	53
(India) Nidhin Krishna	2023-	44	05	02	02	00	00	53
(India) Muhammed Rashid	2017–2022	35	01	05	03	04 (Note: Sheikh Kamal Cup)	00	48

=== 26-45 appearances ===
Name	Period	I-League	Super Cup	Durand Cup	IFA Shield	Others	AFC Cup	Appearances
(India) Sourav K	2021–2024	29	07	06	01	01 (Note: play–offs for AFC Cup)	01	45
(India) Rahul Raju	2022-	32	06	04	00	00	01	43
(India) Sebastian Thangmuansang	2019–2021, 2024-2025	31	00	04	03	04 (Note: Sheikh Kamal Cup)	00	42
(Afghanistan) Sharif Mukhammad	2020-2022	30	00	04	03	00	03	40
(India) Arjun Jayaraj	2017–2019, 2022-2024	37	02	01	00	00	00	40
(India) Mohammed Irshad	2017–2018, 2019–2020	29	01	04	01	04	00	39
(India) Mohammed Jassim	2021–2023	29	04	03	01	01	01	39
(Ghana) Daniel Addo	2017–2019	36	02	00	00	00	00	38
(India) Abdul Hakku	2022-2024	29	06	00	00	01	01	37
(India) Jithin M S	2019-2022	23	00	03	07	00	03	36
(India) Naocha singh	2019–2021	24	00	05	03	04	00	36
(India) VP Suhair	2016-17, 2018–19, 2024–25	36	00	00	00	00	00	36
(India) Rakshit Dagar	2021–2022, 2025-	22	02	03	05	00	04	36
(India) Salam Ranjan Singh	2023-2025	33	01	00	00	00	00	34
(India) Pawan Kumar	2021–2023	27	02	03	00	01	00	33
(India) Vikas Saini	2022-2024	23	05	03	00	01	00	32
(Uganda) Henry Kisekka	2019–2020	22	02	03	00	04	00	31
(India) Muhammad Uvais	2021–2022	18	00	03	05	00	03	29
(India) Mayakkannan	2019–2021	23	00	02	03	00	00	28
(Spain) Álex Sánchez	2023–2024	22	02	04	00	00	00	28
(India) Ubaid CK	2019–2021	20	00	04	03	00	00	27
(India) Ngangom Ronald Singh	2020-2024	16	00	02	08	00	01	27
(India) Alex Saji	2020-2022	16	00	03	05	00	03	27

=== 15-25 appearances ===
Name	Period	I-League	Super Cup	Durand Cup	IFA Shield	Others	AFC Cup	Appearances
(Trinidad and Tobago) Marcus Joseph	2019–2020	17	00	05	00	03 (Note: Sheikh Kamal Cup)	00	25
(Afghanistan) Farshad Noor	2022-2023	20	04	00	00	01 (Note: play–offs for AFC Cup)	00	25
(India) Zodingliana Ralte	2021–2022	16	00	02	05	00	01	24
(India) Shibil Muhammed	2019–2021	12	00	04	03	04	00	23
(India) Subhankar Adhikari	2022-2023	21	02	00	00	00	00	23
(India) Muhammad Saheef	2023-2024	21	02	00	00	00	00	23
(Trinidad and Tobago) Andre Ettienne	2018–2020	11	00	05	00	04	00	20
(Uganda) Musa Mudde	2017–2019	17	02	00	00	00	00	19
(India) Jestin George	2019–2021	10	00	04	03	01	00	18
(India) Provat Lakra	2017–2018	15	02	00	00	00	00	17
(Nigeria) Emmanuel Chigozie	2017–2018	15	02	00	00	00	00	17
(India) Salman K	2017–2021	14	01	01	01	00	00	17
(Ghana) Mohamed Awal	2020-2021	14	00	00	03	00	00	17
(Ghana) Denny Antwi	2020-2021	15	00	00	02	00	00	17
(Brazil) Guilherme Batata	2018–2019	16	00	00	00	00	00	16
(Slovenia) Luka Majcen	2021–2022	13	00	00	00	00	03	16
(India) Bilal Khan	2017–2018, 2022-2023	15	01	00	00	00	00	16
(India) Pritam Singh	2018–2019	15	00	00	00	00	00	15
(India) Lalromawia	2019–2021	14	00	00	00	01	00	15
(Ghana) Philip Adjah	2020-2021	15	00	00	00	00	00	15
(India) Deepak Devrani	2020–2021	14	00	00	01	00	00	15

== Goals ==
As of 13 April 2024

- All time top scorer: (Trinidad and Tobago) Marcus Joseph – 26 goals
- Most goals in I-League – (Spain) Álex Sánchez(19 goals)
- Most goals in Indian Super Cup – (Uganda) Henry Kisekka (3 goals)
- Most goals in Durand Cup – (Trinidad and Tobago) Marcus Joseph (11 goals)
- Most goals in Sheikh Kamal Cup – (Uganda) Henry Kisekka (3 goals)
- Most goals in IFA Shield – (Ghana) Rahim Osumanu (5 goals)
- Most goals in AFC Cup – (Slovenia) Luka Majcen (2 goals)

=== Top scorers ===
As of 7 March 2026

Still active team players are highlighted

Top scorers record
#	Player	Career	I-League	Super Cup	Durand Cup	IFA Shield	Sheikh Kamal Cup	AFC Cup	Total
1	(Trinidad and Tobago) Marcus Joseph	2019–2020	14	0	11	0	1	0	26
2	(Spain) Álex Sánchez	2023-2024	19	1	0	0	0	0	20
3	(Uganda) Henry Kisekka	2017–2018, 2019–2020	9	3	1	0	3	0	16
3	(Ghana) Denny Antwi	2020-2021	11	0	0	4	0	0	15
4	(Slovenia) Luka Majcen	2022	13	0	0	0	0	2	15
5	(Lesotho) Thabiso Brown	2025-	12	0	0	0	0	0	12
6	(Jamaica) Jourdaine Fletcher	2022	9	0	0	0	0	1	10

=== Goal scorers ===
Player	Career	I-League	Super Cup	Durand Cup	IFA Shield	Others	AFC Cup	Total
(India) Thahir Zaman	2021-2023	8	1					9
(Spain) Sergio Mendigutxia	2022-2023	8	1					9
(Spain) Nacho Abeledo	2024-2025	9						9
(Ghana) Rahim Osumanu	2021-2022			3	5			8
(India) Jithin M S	2020-2022	5			2		1	8
(India) Sreekuttan VS	2022-2024	6		2				8
(Afghanistan) Sharif Mukhammad	2020-2022	6		1				7
(India) Ngangom Ronald Singh	2020-2022	2			4			6
(Tajikistan) Komron Tursunov	2023-2024	6						6
(India) Abhijith Kurungodan	2021-2022, 2023-2025	4		1	1			6
(Mali) Adama Niane	2024-2025	6						6
(India) Shibil Muhammed	2019-2021	3		1	1			5
(Ghana) Philip Adjah	2020-2021	5						5
(Afghanistan) Farshad Noor	2022-2023	3	1			1 (Note: play–offs for AFC Cup)		5
(Cameroon) Aminou Bouba	2021-2024	3		2				5
(India) Sourav K	2021-2024	2	1	2				5
(Serbia) Matija Babović	2024	5						5
(Serbia) Nikola Stojanović	2024	5						5
(India) Noufal PN	2022-2024	5						5
(Montenegro) Sinisa Stanisavic	2025	5						5
(India) Emil Benny	2020-2022	4						4
(Nigeria) Joel Sunday	2018-19	3						3
(Bahrain) Mahmood Al-Ajmi	2018	3						3
(Ghana) Daniel Addo	2017-19	3						3
(Nigeria) Chisom Chikatara	2021			3				3
(India) Beneston Barretto	2021-2022			2	1			3
(India) Shijin Thadhyouse	2022-2025	3						3
(Spain) Nili Perdomo	2023	3						3
(India) Rishad PP	2022-	2					1	3
(India) Kivi Zhimomi	2017-18	2						2
(Grenada) Antonio German	2018-19	2						2
(India) Rajesh S	2018-19	2						2
(India) Arjun Jayaraj	2017-19, 2022-2024	2						2
(India) Lalromawia	2019-2021	1				1 (Note: Sheikh Kamal Cup)		2
(India) Abdul Hakku	2022-2024	1	1					2
(India) Samuel Mensah Koney	2023		2					2
(India) Rahul Raju	2022-	2						2
(Uruguay) Martín Cháves	2024	2						2
(India) Athul Unnikrishnan	2024	2						2
(Ivory Coast) Kamo Bayi	2017	1						1
(Syria) Khaled Al Saleh	2017-18	1						1
(India) Santu Singh	2017-18	1						1
(Nigeria) Emmanuel Chigozie	2017-18	1						1
(Uganda) Musa Mudde	2017-18	1						1
(India) Baoringdao Bodo	2018-19	1						1
(India) Ghani Nigam	2018-19	1						1
(Ghana) Christian Sabah	2018-19	1						1
(India) Pritam Singh	2018-19	1					1	
(India) Suhair VP	2018-19	1						1
(Trinidad and Tobago) Andre Ettienne	2019-2020	1						1
(Trinidad and Tobago) Nathaniel García	2019-2020					1		1
(India) Jestin George	2018-2021	1						1
(India) Zodingliana Ralte	2020-2022	1						1
(India) Muhammed Rashid	2020-2022	1						1
(India) Muhammad Uvais	2022	1						1
(Sri Lanka) Ahmed Waseem Razeek	2022	1						1
(Cameroon) Auguste Somlage	2022	1						1
(Cameroon) Dodi Nde	2022	1						1
(India) Jobby Justin	2023	1						1
(India) Jijo Joseph	2023	1						1
(India) Shilton D'Silva	2023	1						1
(Spain) Omar Ramos	2023		1					1
(Nigeria) Justine Emmanuel	2023	1						1
(India) Laishram Johnson Singh	2023-	1						1
(India) Lalliansanga Renthlei	2024	1						1
(India) Nidhin Krishna	2023-	1						1
(Spain) Pitu Viera	2024	1						1
(India) Tharpuia	2024-2025	1						1
(India) Michael Soosairaj	2024-2025	1						1
(India) Ranjeet Pandre	2024-2025	1						1
(India) Mashoor Shereef	2024	1						1
(Spain) Albert Torras	2025		1					1
(India) Samuel Kynshi	2025		1					1
(Spain) Juan Carlos Rico	2025		1					1

=== Top scorer by season ===
As of 21 April 2025

Season	Player	Goals (I League)	Goals (All)
2017-18	(Uganda) Henry Kisekka	4	7
2018-19	(Trinidad and Tobago) Marcus Joseph	7	7
2019-20	(Trinidad and Tobago) Marcus Joseph	7	19
2020–21	(Ghana) Denny Antwi	11	18
2021–22	(Slovenia) Luka Majcen	13	15
2022–23	(Spain) Sergio Mendigutxia	8	9
2023–24	(Spain) Álex Sánchez	13	14
2024–25	(Lesotho) Thabiso Brown	11	11

== Milestones ==
As of 7 March 2026

Goal No	Player	League Season
01	(Ivory Coast) Kamo Bayi	2017-18
10	(Bahrain) Mahmood Al-Ajmi	2017-18
50	(Trinidad and Tobago) Marcus Joseph	2019-20
100	(Ghana) Philip Adjah	2020-21
200	(Cameroon) Dodi Nde	2022-23
250	(Spain) Álex Sánchez	2023-24
300	(Mali) Adama Niane	2024-25
346	(Uzbekistan) Mirjalol Kasimov	2025-26

== Assists ==
As of 17 March 2025

Player	Career	I-League	Super Cup	Durand Cup	IFA Shield	Sheikh Kamal Cup	AFC Cup	Total
(India) Noufal PN	2022-2024	13		1				14
(India) Emil Benny	2020-2022	5		1	2			8
(Spain) Álex Sánchez	2023-2024	5		3				8
(Ghana) Denny Antwi	2020-2021	7						7
(Slovenia) Luka Majcen	2022	5					2	7
(Spain) Nacho Abeledo	2024-2025	7						7
(India) Sreekuttan VS	2022-2024	6						6
(Trinidad and Tobago) Marcus Joseph	2019-2020	5						5
(India) Deepak Devrani	2020-2021	4						4
(Uganda) Henry Kisekka	2019-2020	3		1				4
(India) Beneston Barretto	2021-2022			3	1			4
(India) Jithin MS	2018-	2			2			4
(Jamaica) Jourdaine Fletcher	2022	2					2	4
(Afghanistan) Farshad Noor	2022-2023	4						4
(Spain) Edu Bedia	2023-2024	4						4
(Spain) Nili Perdomo	2023-2024	3		1				4
(India) Rishad PP	2021-	3			1			4
(India) Sebastian Thangmuansang	2019-2021, 2024-	3						3
(India) Muhammad Uvais	2021-2022	3						3

== Clean sheets ==
As of 20 March 2026

Player	Career	I-League	Super Cup	Durand Cup	IFA Shield	Sheikh Kamal Cup	Total
(India) Shibinraj Kunniyil	2018-19, 2022–23, 2024-	19	1				20
(India) Ubaid CK	2019-2021	8		2		2	12
(India) Rakshit Dagar	2021-2022, 2025-	8			1		9
(India) Bilal Khan	2017-18, 2022-2023	4					4
(India) Devansh Dabas	2023-2024	3					3
(India) Nikhil C Barnard	2017-18		1				1
(India) Ajmal P. A.	2018-2022			1			1

=== Head coach's record ===
As of 26 March 2026

Name	Nationality	From	To	P	W	D	L	GF	GA	Win%
Bino George	India	8 October 2017	26 February 2019	40	10	11	19	45	58	25.00
Gift Raikhan	India	26 February 2019	1 July 2019	3	1	0	2	4	6	33.33
Fernando Santiago Varela	Spain	1 July 2019	16 June 2020	20	11	4	5	25	10	55.00
Vincenzo Alberto Annese	Italy	19 August 2020	1 June 2022	40	25	7	8	90	42	62.50
Richard Towa	Cameroon	5 July 2022	22 December 2022	9	4	3	2	7	3	44.44
Francesc Bonet	Spain	27 December 2022	31 May 2023	18	9	0	9	28	25	50.00
Mingo Oramas	Spain	June 2023	31 March 2024	29	12	7	10	54	44	41.38
Antonio Rueda Fernández	Spain	18 April 2024	14 February 2025	14	5	4	5	22	15	35.71
Ranjith T Ajithkumar (interim coach)	India	15 February 2025	5 June 2025	9	6	0	3	23	17	66.67
José Hevia	Spain	6 June 2025	10 January 2026	5	1	0	4	4	13	20.00
Derrick Pereira	India	10 January 2026	7 March 2026	2	0	2	0	1	1	0.00
Dimitris Dimitriou	Cyprus	6 March 2026	—	3	1	0	2	2	3	33.33

== Club captains ==
Period	Name
2017–2018	(India) Sushanth Mathew
2018–2019	(Uganda) Musa Mudde
2019	(Ghana) Daniel Addo
2019–2020	(Trinidad and Tobago) Marcus Joseph
2020–2021	(Ghana) Mohamed Awal
2021–2022	(Afghanistan) Sharif Mukhammad
2022–2023	(Cameroon) Aminou Bouba
2023–2024	(Spain) Álex Sánchez
2024–2025	(Spain) Sergio Llamas
2025–	(India) Shibinraj Kunniyil

== Head to head records ==
As of 26 March 2026

Team	Span	Tournament(s)	Record				
Team	Span	Tournament(s)	G	W	D	L	Win %
Shillong Lajong	2017-	I-league	10	3	2	5	30.00
Chennai City	2017-2021	I-league, Sheikh kamal Cup	8	3	1	4	37.50
NEROCA	2017-	I-league	13	6	3	4	46.15
Indian Arrows	2017-	I-league	7	4	1	2	57.14
East Bengal	2017-	I-league, Durand cup	8	2	2	4	25.00
Aizawl	2017-	I-league	13	5	3	5	38.46
Punjab	2017-	I-league, Super Cup	14	6	3	5	42.86
Churchill Brothers	2017-	I-league	16	7	4	5	43.75
Mohun Bagan	2017-	I-league, Durand cup, IFA Shield	7	2	3	2	28.57
NorthEast United	2017-	Super cup	1	1	0	0	100.00
Bengaluru	2017-	Super cup, Durand cup	3	0	0	3	0.00
Real Kashmir	2018-	I league, IFA Sheld	13	2	6	5	15.38
TRAU	2019-	I league, Durand cup	8	5	1	2	62.50
Chennaiyin	2019-	Durand cup, Super Cup	2	1	0	1	50.00
Indian Air Force	2019-	Durand cup	2	2	0	0	100.00
Mohammedan	2020-	I league, Durand Cup, IFA Shield, Supercup	10	3	2	5	30.00
Sudeva Delhi	2020-	I league	4	4	0	0	100.00
(Bangladesh) Bashundhara Kings	2019	Sheikh kamal Cup, AFC Cup	2	1	0	1	50.00
(Malaysia) Terengganu F.C.	2019	Sheikh kamal Cup	1	0	1	0	0.00
(Bangladesh) Chittagong Abahani	2019	Sheikh kamal Cup	1	0	0	1	0.00
Army Red	2021-	Durand Cup	1	0	1	0	0.00
Hyderabad	2021-	Durand Cup	1	1	0	0	100.00
Assam Rifles	2021-	Durand Cup	1	1	0	0	100.00
Kidderpore	2021-	IFA Shield	1	1	0	0	100.00
BSS Sporting Club	2021-	IFA Shield	1	0	1	0	0.00
Peerless SC	2021-	IFA Shield	1	1	0	0	100.00
United SC	2021-	IFA Shield	1	0	1	0	0.00
Kenkre	2022-	I league	3	2	1	0	66.67
Rajasthan United	2022-	I league	8	6	2	0	75.00
Sreenidi Deccan	2022-	I league	8	5	0	3	62.50
ATK Mohun Bagan	2022-	AFC Cup, Super Cup	2	1	1	0	50.00
(Maldives) Maziya	2022-	AFC Cup	1	0	0	1	0.00
Goa	2023-	Super Cup	2	0	0	2	0.00
Jamshedpur FC	2023-	Super Cup	1	0	0	1	0.00
Odisha	2023-	AFC Cup Playoff	1	0	0	1	0.00
Kerala Blasters	2023-	Durand cup	1	1	0	0	100.00
Inter Kashi	2023-	I league	4	2	1	1	50.00
Namdhari	2023-	I league	5	1	1	3	20.00
Mumbai City	2023-	Super cup	1	0	0	1	0.00
Delhi	2024-	I league	4	3	0	1	75.00
Dempo	2025-	I league	3	2	0	1	66.67
Sporting Bengaluru	2025-	I league	2	2	0	0	100.00
Chanmari	2026-	I league	1	0	1	0	0.00
