= 2021–22 Gokulam Kerala FC season =

Indian football club season

Gokulam Kerala
2021–22 season
- Chairman: Gokulam Gopalan
- Head Coach: Vincenzo Alberto Annese
- Stadium: EMS Stadium
- I-League: 1st
- Durand Cup: Quarter finals
- IFA Shield: Semi finals
- AFC Cup: Group Stage
- Top goalscorer: League: Luka Majcen (13 goals); All: Luka Majcen (15 goals)
Home colours	Away colours

The 2021–22 season was Gokulam Kerala's fifth season since its establishment in 2017 and their fourth season in the I-League. In addition to the I-League, Gokulam Kerala also participated in the Durand Cup, IFA Shield, and continental tournament AFC Cup.

== First-team squad ==
Squad no.	Name	Nationality	Position(s)	Age	Previous club	Since	Apps	Goals
Goalkeepers
01	Rakshit Dagar	(India)	GK	28	(India) Sudeva Delhi	2021	29	0
30	Vigneshwaran Baskaran	(India)	GK	30	Gokulam Kerala Reserves	2019	3	0
33	Ajmal P. A.	(India)	GK	25	Gokulam Kerala Reserves	2018	3	0
Defenders
3	Mohammed Jassim	(India)	LB	24	Gokulam Kerala Reserves	2020	20	0
4	Alex Saji	(India)	CB	21	Gokulam Kerala Reserves	2020	27	0
5	Pawan Kumar	(India)	CB	26	(India) Real Kashmir	2021	14	0
15	Aminou Bouba	(Cameroon)	CB	30	(Cameroon) Eding Sport FC	2021	30	2
16	Muhammad Uvais	(India)	CB	21	(India) KSEB Football Team	2021	29	1
24	Abdul Hakku	(India)	CB	27	(India) Kerala Blasters	2022	6	0
27	Takhellambam Deepak	(India)	RB	24	(India) NEROCA	2021	4	0
32	Shahajaz Thekkan	(India)	RB	24	(India) Kerala Blasters	2021	5	0
MidFielders
6	Charles Anandraj	(India)	DM	29	(India) Chennai City	2021	1	0
7	Thahir Zaman	(India)	AM	26	Gokulam Kerala Reserves	2020	27	5
8	Rishad PP	(India)	AM	26	Gokulam Kerala Reserves	2021	24	2
11	Emil Benny	(India)	AM	21	Gokulam Kerala Reserves	2020	43	4
12	Muhammed Rashid	(India)	CM	27	Gokulam Kerala Reserves	2017	48	1
14	Zodingliana Ralte	(India)	LM	26	(India) NEROCA	2020	24	1
20	Ahmed Waseem Razeek	(Sri Lanka)	CM	27	(Sri Lanka) Up Country Lions	2022	07	1
21	Sharif Mukhammad	(Afghanistan)	DM/CB	31	(Maldives) Maziya	2020	40	8
42	Abhijith K	(India)	CM	24	Gokulam Kerala Reserves	2021	9	1
Forwards
9	Sourav K	(India)	FW	21	Gokulam Kerala Reserves	2021	9	1
10	Ngangom Ronald Singh	(India)	RW/ST	24	(India) NEROCA	2020	26	5
13	Sreekuttan VS	(India)	FW	23	(India) Kerala blasters	2022	20	2
18	Jithin M S	(India)	FW	23	(India) Kerala blasters	2019	36	8
19	Rahim Osumanu	(Ghana)	FW	26	(Ethiopia) Jimma Aba Jifar	2021	10	8
22	Beneston Barretto	(India)	FW	21	(India) Guardian Angel SC	2021	12	3
98	Jourdaine Fletcher	(Jamaica)	FW	24	(Jamaica) Mount Pleasant	2022	18	10
99	Luka Majcen	(Slovenia)	FW	32	(India) Bengaluru United	2022	16	15

=== New contracts ===
Date	Position	No.	Player	Ref.
28 May 2021	MF	21	(Afghanistan) Sharif Mukhammad	

== Transfers & loans ==
=== Transfers in ===
Entry date	Position	No.	Player	Previous club	Fee	Ref.
21 May 2021	DF	-	Muhammed Rafi	(India) Bengaluru FC Reserves	None	
7 June 2021	DF	-	Muhammed Uvais	(India) KSEB Football Team	None	
25 June 2021	MF	-	Khundongbam Krishnanda	(India) TRAU FC	None	
2 July 2021	DF	27	Takhellambam Deepak	(India) NEROCA	None	
9 July 2021	GK	01	Rakshit Dagar	(India) Sudeva Delhi	None	
16 July 2021	DF	-	Shoaib Akhtar	(India) NEROCA	None	
23 July 2021	MF	-	Akbar Khan	(India) NEROCA	None	
13 August 2021	FW	22	Beneston Barretto	(India) Guardian Angel SC	None	
23 August 2021	DF	5	Pawan Kumar	(India) Real Kashmir	None	
25 August 2021	MF	6	Charles Anandraj	(India) Chennai City	None	
26 August 2021	DF	15	(Cameroon) Aminou Bouba	(Cameroon) Eding Sport FC	None	
30 August 2021	MF	9	Sourav K		None	
31 August 2021	FW	19	(Ghana) Rahim Osumanu	(Ethiopia) Jimma Aba Jifar	None	
3 September 2021	FW	13	(Nigeria) Chisom Chikatara	(Iraq) Naft Maysan	None	
3 November 2021	DF	-	(India) Shahajaz Thekkan	(India) Kerala blasters Reserves	None	
25 December 2021	MF	6	(India) Sinivasan Pandiyan	(India) Chennaiyin	None	
1 February 2022	FW	99	(Slovenia) Luka Majcen	(India) Bengaluru United	None	
20 February 2022	FW	-	(Jamaica) Jourdaine Fletcher	(Jamaica) Mount Pleasant	None	
24 March 2022	MF	-	(Sri Lanka) Ahmed Waseem Razeek	(Sri Lanka) Up Country Lions	None	

=== Loan in ===
Start date	End date	Position	No.	Player	From club	Fee	Ref
24 December 2021	End of season	FW	13	(India) Sreekuttan VS	(India) Kerala Blasters		
24 December 2021	End of season	DF	24	(India) Abdul Hakku	(India) Kerala Blasters		

=== Transfers out ===
Exit date	Position	No.	Player	To club	Fee	Ref.
14 May 2021	FW		(India) Malemngamba Meitei	(India) FC Bengaluru United	None	
14 May 2021	DF	27	(India) Sebastian Thangmuansang	(India) Odisha	None	
18 June 2021	GK	01	(India) Ubaid CK	(India) Sreenidhi FC	None	
30 June 2021	MF	13	(India) Mayakkannan	(India) Sreenidhi FC	None	
1 July 2021	FW	27	(India) Lalromawia	(India) Sreenidhi FC	None	
7 July 2021	DF	26	(India) Deepak Devrani	(India) Chennaiyin	None	
8 July 2021	MF	47	(India) Vincy Barretto	(India) Kerala blasters	Undisclosed fee	
21 July 2021	MF	22	(India) Shibil Muhammed	(India) Sreenidhi FC	None	
23 July 2021	DF	-	(India) Roshan Singh	(India) TRAU FC	None	
31 July 2021	DF	24	(India) Jestin George	(India) Northeast United FC	None	
20 August 2021	MF	-	(India) Antony Beautin	(India) Kerala United FC	None	
22 August 2021	DF	49	(Ghana) Mohamed Awal	(India) Sreenidhi FC	None	
22 August 2021	DF	-	(India) Muhammad Asif	(India) Bhawanipore	None	
22 August 2021	DF	15	(India) Mohamed Salah	(India) Sreenidhi FC	None	
28 August 2021	DF	02	(India) Naocha Singh	(India) Mumbai City	None	
31 August 2021	FW	50	(Ghana) Philip Adjah	(Bangladesh) Rahmatganj MFS	None	
31 August 2021	FW	16	(India) Salman K	(India) Kerala United FC	None	
31 August 2021	FW	33	(Ghana) Denny Antwi	(United Arab Emirates) Al-Taawon	None	
31 August 2021	DF	05	(India) Rowilson Rodrigues		None	
31 August 2021	DF	06	(India) Ashok Singh		None	
31 August 2021	DF	-	(India) Muhammed Rafi	(India) Hyderabad FC	None	
1 September 2021	MF	-	(India) Akbar Khan	(India) Sudeva Delhi	None	
3 September 2021	FW	-	(India) Lalliansanga	(India) Aizawl	None	
21 September 2021	FW	47	(India) Rahul KP	(India) Sreenidhi FC	None	
21 September 2021	GK	-	(India) Shayan Roy	(India) Madan Maharaj FC	None	
1 December 2021	MF	-	(India) Khundongbam Krishnanda	(India) TRAU FC	None	
1 December 2021	DF	02	(India) Ajin Tom	(India) Muthoot FA	None	
1 March 2022	Fw	13	(Nigeria) Chisom Chikatara	(Nigeria) Abia Warriors FC	None	

== Current technical staff ==
Position	Name
Head coach	(Italy) Vincenzo Alberto Annese
Fitness and conditioning Coach	(Brazil) Djair Miranda Garcia
Technical director	Vacant
Goalkeeping coach	(Nepal) Manish Timsina
Academy manager	(Gibraltar) Joel Richard Williams

== Pre-season ==
22 August 2021 Friendly	Gokulam Kerala	4–1	Kovalam FC	Kozhikode
16.00 IST				Stadium: EMS Stadium

3 September 2021 Friendly	Gokulam Kerala	2–0	Kerala United FC	Kozhikode
16.00 IST				Stadium: EMS Stadium

6 October 2021 Friendly	Gokulam Kerala	1–2	Indian Navy	Kozhikode
16.00 IST				Stadium: EMS Stadium

11 October 2021 Friendly	Gokulam Kerala	5–0	Kerala Police	Kozhikode
16.00 IST				Stadium: EMS Stadium

15 October 2021 Friendly	Hyderabad	2–1	Gokulam Kerala	Goa
16:00 IST	Tamang; Chianese	Report	Sourav

20 October 2021 Friendly	East Bengal	2–1	Gokulam Kerala	Panaji
15:30 IST	Balwant 40'; Angousana 45+2'		Osumanu 71'	Stadium: Don Bosco Ground

22 October 2021 Friendly	Goa	0–0	Gokulam Kerala	Goa
16:30 IST

21 November 2021 Friendly	Gokulam Kerala	2–1	Kerala United FC	Manjeri
07.00 IST				Stadium: Payyanad Stadium

14 February 2022 Friendly	Gokulam Kerala	2–3	Kerala United FC	Kozhikode
16.00 IST				Stadium: EMS Stadium

== Competitions ==
=== Overview ===
Competition	First match	Last match	Final position	Record							
Competition	First match	Last match	Final position	Pld	W	D	L	GF	GA	GD	Win %
I-League	26 December 2021	14 May 2022	Champions	18	13	4	1	44	15	+29	72.22
Durand Cup	12 September 2021	23 September 2021	R16	4	2	1	1	10	5	+5	50.00
IFA Shield	26 November 2021	12 December 2021	Semi Final	5	2	2	1	13	6	+7	40.00
AFC Cup	18 May 2022	24 May 2022	Group stage	3	1	0	2	5	5	+0	33.33
Total				30	18	7	5	72	31	+41	60.00

Last updated: 24 May 2022.
Source: Competitions

=== I-League ===
==== League table ====
Pos	Team	Pld	W	D	L	GF	GA	GD	Pts	Qualification
1	Gokulam Kerala	12	9	3	0	33	10	+23	30	Championship stage
2	Mohammedan	12	8	2	2	23	12	+11	26	Championship stage
3	RoundGlass Punjab	12	7	2	3	25	17	+8	23	Championship stage
4	Sreenidi Deccan	12	6	3	3	18	14	+4	21	Championship stage
5	Churchill Brothers	12	6	2	4	16	15	+1	20	Championship stage

Source: Hero I-League
Rules for classification: 1) points; 2) head-to-head points; 3) head-to-head goal difference; 4) goal difference; 5) number of goals scored; 6) drawing of lots

Pos	Team	Pld	W	D	L	GF	GA	GD	Pts	Qualification
1	Gokulam Kerala	18	13	4	1	44	15	+29	43	Champions and qualification for the play–offs for 2023–24 AFC Cup group stage spot
2	Mohammedan	18	11	4	3	34	18	+16	37	
3	Sreenidi Deccan	18	9	5	4	27	19	+8	32	
4	Churchill Brothers	18	9	3	6	24	22	+2	30	
5	RoundGlass Punjab	18	8	4	6	33	29	+4	28	

Source: Hero I-League
Rules for classification: 1) points; 2) head-to-head points; 3) head-to-head goal difference; 4) goal difference; 5) number of goals scored; 6) drawing of lots

Pos	Team	Pld	W	D	L	GF	GA	GD	Pts
1	Aizawl	17	7	0	10	23	26	−3	21
2	TRAU	17	4	6	7	15	17	−2	18
3	Indian Arrows	17	4	5	8	10	23	−13	17 (Note: Head-to-head standings: Indian Arrows 4 points, Sudeva Delhi 1 point.)
4	Sudeva Delhi	17	4	5	8	13	23	−10	17
5	Real Kashmir	17	2	8	7	23	31	−8	14
6	Kenkre	17	3	3	11	11	25	−14	12

Source: Hero I-League
Rules for classification: 1) points; 2) head-to-head points; 3) head-to-head goal difference; 4) goal difference; 5) number of goals scored; 6) drawing of lots
Notes:

Pos	Team	Pld	W	D	L	GF	GA	GD	Pts
1	Gokulam Kerala (C)	18	13	4	1	44	15	+29	43
2	Mohammedan	18	11	4	3	34	18	+16	37
3	Sreenidi Deccan	18	9	5	4	27	19	+8	32
4	Churchill Brothers	18	9	3	6	24	22	+2	30
5	RoundGlass Punjab	18	8	4	6	33	29	+4	28

Source: Hero I-League
Rules for classification: 1) points; 2) head-to-head points; 3) head-to-head goal difference; 4) goal difference; 5) number of goals scored; 6) drawing of lots
(C) Champions

=== Results by round ===
Round	1	2	3	4	5	6	7	8	9	10	11	12	13	14	15	16	17	18	19	20
Result	W	D	W	W	-	W	D	D	W	W	W	W	W	W	-	D	W	W	L	W
Position	5	5	3	2	2	2	2	2	2	2	1	1	1	1	1	1	1	1	1	1

W = Win; D = Draw; L = Loss

==== Mathes ====
I-league fixtures were published on 9 December 2021.

After the commencement of the first match-week of the league on 27 December 2021, the tournament got suspended on 29 December due to reports of numerous COVID-19 cases among the players and staff. All India Football Federation released new dates on 1 February 2022, with a revised schedule of the league resuming from 3 March.

26 December 2021 1	Gokulam Kerala	1-0	Churchill Brothers	Kalyani
16.30 IST	Sharif Mukhammad 16' (pen.)			Stadium: Kalyani Municipal Stadium; Attendance: Man of the Match: Sharif Mukhammad

3 March 2022 2	NEROCA	0-0	Gokulam Kerala	Kalyani
16.30 IST				Stadium: Kalyani Municipal Stadium; Attendance:

7 March 2022 3	Gokulam Kerala	5-1	Real Kashmir	Kalyani
16.30 IST	Luka Majcen 4' (pen.) 38'; Jourdaine Fletcher 5', 27'; Jithin M S 66'		Tiago Adan 48' (pen.)	Stadium: Kalyani Municipal Stadium; Attendance: Man of the Match: Jourdaine Fletcher

12 March 2022 4	Gokulam Kerala	6-2	Kenkre	Kalyani
16.30 IST	Luka Majcen 3', 47', 84'; Jithin M S 16'; Thahir Zaman 18'; Muhammad Uvais 89'		Akeraj Martins 73'; Lester Fernandez 90+5'	Stadium: Kalyani Municipal Stadium; Attendance: Man of the Match: Luka Majcen

21 March 2022 5	TRAU	2-3	Gokulam Kerala	Kalyani
16.30 IST			Jithin M S 2'; Luka Majcen 19', 55'	Stadium: Kalyani Municipal Stadium; Attendance:

25 March 2022 6	Mohammedan	1-1	Gokulam Kerala	Naihati
19.30 IST			Luka Majcen 75' (pen.)	Stadium: Naihati Bankimanjali Stadium; Attendance: Man of the Match: Jithin M S

29 March 2022 7	Gokulam Kerala	1-1	Rajasthan United	Kalyani
15.30 IST			Ngangom Ronald Singh 89'	Stadium: Kalyani Municipal Stadium; Attendance: Man of the Match: Luka Majcen

1 April 2022 8	Aizawl	1-2	Gokulam Kerala	Kalyani
17.00 IST			Jourdaine Fletcher 64', 89'	Stadium: Kalyani Municipal Stadium; Attendance:

5 April 2022 9	Sreenidi Deccan	1-2	Gokulam Kerala	Kalyani
17.05 IST			Aminou Bouba 5'; Jourdaine Fletcher 29'	Stadium: Kalyani Municipal Stadium; Attendance: Man of the Match: Aminou Bouba

9 April 2022 10	Gokulam Kerala	5-0	Indian Arrows	Kalyani
17.05 IST	Ahmed Waseem Razeek 10'; Sharif Mukhammad 28'; Luka Majcen 32'; Jithin M S 72'; Thahir Zaman 81'			Stadium: Kalyani Municipal Stadium; Attendance: Man of the Match: Luka Majcen

15 April 2022 11	Sudeva Delhi	0-4	Gokulam Kerala	Kalyani
17.05 IST			Luka Majcen 17', 60', 86'; Thahir Zaman 27'	Stadium: Kalyani Municipal Stadium; Attendance: Man of the Match: Luka Majcen

19 April 2022 12	Punjab	1-3	Gokulam Kerala	Kalyani
17.05 IST			Aminou Bouba 13'; Luka Majcen 64'; Josef Yarny 72' (o.g.)	Stadium: Kalyani Municipal Stadium; Attendance: Man of the Match: Aminou Bouba

=== Matches ===
23 April 2022 13	Punjab	0-2	Gokulam Kerala	Kalyani
17.05 IST			Jourdaine Fletcher 16'; Sreekuttan VS 83'	Stadium: Kalyani Municipal Stadium; Attendance: Man of the Match: Alex Saji

30 April 2022 14	Gokulam Kerala	1-1	Churchill Brothers	Kalyani
17.05 IST	Jourdaine Fletcher 38'			Stadium: Kalyani Municipal Stadium; Attendance: Man of the Match: Sharif Mukhammad

3 May 2022 15	NEROCA	0-4	Gokulam Kerala	Kalyani
20.05 IST			Thahir Zaman 19', 49'; Jourdaine Fletcher 53'; Sreekuttan VS 90+4'	Stadium: Kalyani Municipal Stadium; Attendance: Man of the Match: Thahir Zaman

7 May 2022 16	Gokulam Kerala	1-0	Rajasthan United	Kalyani
20.00 IST	Jourdaine Fletcher 27'			Stadium: Kalyani Municipal Stadium; Attendance: Man of the Match: Rishad PP

10 May 2022 17	Sreenidi Deccan	3-1	Gokulam Kerala	Kalyani
IST				Stadium: Kalyani Municipal Stadium; Attendance:

14 May 2022 18	Mohammedan	1-2	Gokulam Kerala	Naihati
IST				Stadium: Naihati Bankimanjali Stadium; Attendance:

=== Durand Cup ===
==== Group D ====
Pos	Team	Pld	W	D	L	GF	GA	GD	Pts	Qualification
1	Gokulam Kerala	3	2	1	0	10	4	+6	7	Knockout stage
2	Army Red	3	2	1	0	8	4	+4	7	Knockout stage
3	Hyderabad	3	1	0	2	6	3	+3	3	
4	Assam Rifles	3	0	0	3	3	16	−13	0	

Rules for classification: 1) points; 2) head-to-head points; 3) head-to-head goal difference; 4) goal difference; 5) number of goals scored; 6) drawing of lots

12 September 2021 1	Gokulam Kerala	2–2	Army Red	Kalyani
15.00 IST	Osumanu 8'; Mukhammad 68' (pen.)	Report	Jain P 30'; Thapa 43'; Kumar (yellow card) 45'; Shafeel (yellow card) 73'	Stadium: Kalyani Stadium; Attendance: Man of the Match: Christopher Kamei (Army Red)

16 September 2021 4	Gokulam Kerala	1–0	Hyderabad	Kalyani
15.00 IST	Osumanu 46'; Benny (yellow card) (yellow-red card) 48'; Mukhammad (yellow card) 57'	Report		Stadium: Kalyani Stadium; Attendance: Man of the Match: Sharif Mukhammad (Gokulam Kerala FC)

19 September 2021 3	Assam Rifles	2–7	Gokulam Kerala	Kalyani
15.00 IST	Singh 36'; Rabha 63'	Report	Chikatara 1', 52', 72'; Baretto 2', 45+2'; Osumanu 34'; Sourav 60'	Stadium: Kalyani Stadium; Attendance: Man of the Match: Chisom Chikatara (Gokulam Kerala)

==== Quarter-final ====
23 September 2021 QF	Mohammedan	1-0	Gokulam Kerala	Kolkata
15.00 IST				Stadium: Vivekananda Yuba Bharati Krirangan

=== IFA Shield ===
==== Group C ====
Pos	Team	Pld	W	D	L	GF	GA	GD	Pts	
1	Gokulam Kerala	2	1	1	0	8	1	+7	4	Advance to the quarterfinals
2	Kidderpore	2	1	0	1	1	7	−6	3	Advance to the quarterfinals
3	BSS	2	0	1	1	1	2	−1	1	

Source: ifawb.org

26 November 2021 1	Gokulam Kerala	7-0	Kidderpore SC	Naihati
14.00 IST	Nitish Hazra 4' (o.g.); Abhijith K 53'; Ronald Singh 57', 67'; Rahim Osumanu 71', 72'; Beneston Barreto 85'			Stadium: Naihati Stadium; Attendance:

29 November 2021 2	Gokulam Kerala	1-1	BSS	Naihati
14.00 IST	Rahim Osumanu 45'		Dodoz 42'	Stadium: Naihati Stadium; Attendance:

==== Pre-Quarter Final ====
6 December 2021 PQF	Gokulam Kerala	2-1	Peerless SC	Naihati
13.30 IST	Rahim Osumanu 50', 105'			Attendance:

==== Quarter-final ====
9 December 2021 QF	Gokulam Kerala	2-2 (5–4 p)	United SC	Kalyani
13.30 IST	Ngangom Ronald Singh; Jithin M S			Stadium: Kalyani Stadium; Attendance:

==== Semi-final ====
12 December 2021 SF	Gokulam Kerala	1-2	Real Kashmir FC	Kalyani
13.30 IST				Stadium: Kalyani Stadium; Attendance:

=== AFC Cup ===
Gokulam Kerala FC will play in the AFC Cup Group Stage 2022 by virtue of a special dispensation awarded by the Asian Football Confederation (AFC).

=== Group D ===
Pos	Team	Pld	W	D	L	GF	GA	GD	Pts	Qualification	MBSG	BSK	MAZ	GOK
1	(India) ATK Mohun Bagan (H)	3	2	0	1	11	6	+5	6 (Note: Head-to-head points: ATK Mohun Bagan 3, Bashundhara Kings 0.)	Inter-zone play-off semi-finals	—	4–0	—	—
2	(Bangladesh) Bashundhara Kings	3	2	0	1	3	5	−2	6		—	—	1–0	—
3	(Maldives) Maziya	3	1	0	2	3	6	−3	3 (Note: Head-to-head points: Maziya 3, Gokulam Kerala 0.)		2–5	—	—	1–0
4	(India) Gokulam Kerala	3	1	0	2	5	5	0	3		4–2	1–2	—	—

Source: AFC
Rules for classification: Tiebreakers
(H) Hosts
Notes:

18 May 2022	Gokulam Kerala (India)	4−2	(India) ATK Mohun Bagan	Kolkata
16:30 UTC+5:30	Majcen 50', 65'; Rishad 57'; Jithin 89'	Report	Kotal 53'; Colaco 80'	Stadium: Vivekananda Yuba Bharati Krirangan; Referee: Seyed Vahid Kazemi (Iran)

21 May 2022	Maziya (Maldives)	1–0	(India) Gokulam Kerala	Kolkata
20:30 UTC+5:30	Stewart 50'	Report		Stadium: Vivekananda Yuba Bharati Krirangan, Kolkata; Referee: Baraa Aisha (Palestine)

24 May 2022	Gokulam Kerala (India)	1–2	(Bangladesh) Bashundhara Kings	Kolkata
--:-- UTC+5:30	Jourdaine Fletcher

== Squad statistics ==
=== Appearances ===
Players with no appearances are not included on the list.

As of match played 24 May 2022

No.	Pos.	Nat.	Name	I-League		IFA Shield		Durand Cup		AFC Cup		Total	
No.	Pos.	Nat.	Name	Apps	Starts	Apps	Starts	Apps	Starts	Apps	Starts	Apps	Starts
01	GK	(India)	Rakshit Dagar	18	18	5	5	3	3	3	3	29	29
03	LB	(India)	Mohammed Jassim	13	11	1	1	3	1	1	0	18	13
04	CB	(India)	Alex Saji	11	8	5	5	3	2	3	3	22	18
05	DF	(India)	Pawan Kumar	11	11	0	0	3	2	0	0	14	13
07	MF	(India)	Thahir Zaman	15	14	1	0	3	2	3	2	22	18
08	MF	(India)	Rishad PP	14	2	3	3	4	3	3	3	24	11
09	FW	(India)	Sourav K	8	0	3	0	1	0	1	0	13	0
10	FW	(India)	Ngangom Ronald Singh	5	3	5	5	2	1	1	0	13	9
11	MF	(India)	Emil Benny	18	18	5	5	3	3	3	3	29	29
12	MF	(India)	Subhash Singh	2	0	0	0	0	0	0	0	2	0
13	FW	(India)	Sreekuttan VS	17	2	0	0	0	0	3	1	20	3
14	MF	(India)	Zodingliana Ralte	11	1	5	5	2	1	1	0	19	7
15	CB	(Cameroon)	Aminou Bouba	18	18	5	5	4	4	3	3	30	30
16	DF	(India)	Muhammad Uvais	18	18	5	5	3	3	3	3	29	29
18	FW	(India)	Jithin M S	17	17	4	4	4	0	3	1	28	26
20	MF	(Sri Lanka)	Ahmed Waseem Razeek	7	6	0	0	0	0	0	0	7	6
21	MF	(Afghanistan)	Sharif Mukhammad	16	16	3	0	4	4	3	3	26	23
22	FW	(India)	Beneston Barretto	5	0	4	2	3	3	0	0	12	5
24	DF	(India)	Abdul Hakku	5	5	0	0	0	0	2	2	7	7
32	DF	(India)	Shahajaz Thekkan	5	1	0	0	0	0	0	0	5	1
35	DF	(India)	Abhijith Elippatta	1	0	0	0	0	0	0	0	1	0
42	MF	(India)	Abhijith K	4	0	4	4	1	0	0	0	9	4
98	FW	(Jamaica)	Jourdaine Fletcher	15	15	0	0	0	0	3	3	18	18
99	FW	(Slovenia)	Luka Majcen	13	13	0	0	0	0	3	3	16	16
	RB	(India)	Ajin Tom	0	0	0	0	1	1	0	0	1	1
	MF	(India)	Charles Anandraj	0	0	0	0	1	1	0	0	1	1
	FW	(Nigeria)	Chisom Chikatara	0	0	0	0	4	3	0	0	4	3
	MF	(India)	Muhammed Rashid	0	0	0	0	2	0	0	0	2	0
	FW	(Ghana)	Rahim Osumanu	1	1	5	5	4	4	0	0	10	10
	DF	(India)	Takhellambam Deepak	0	0	1	1	3	3	0	0	4	4
	GK	(India)	Ajmal P. A.	0	0	0	0	2	1	0	0	2	1

=== Goal Scorers ===
Rank	No.	Pos.	Nat.	Name	I League	IFA Shield	Durand Cup	AFC Cup	Total
1	99	FW	(Slovenia)	Luka Majcen	13	0	0	2	15
2	98	FW	(Jamaica)	Jourdaine Fletcher	9	0	0	1	10
3	19	FW	(Ghana)	Rahim Osumanu	0	5	3	0	8
4	18	FW	(India)	Jithin M S	4	1	0	1	6
5	7	MF	(India)	Thahir Zaman	5	0	0	0	5
5	10	FW	(India)	Ngangom Ronald Singh	1	4	0	0	5
7	21	MF	(Afghanistan)	Sharif Mukhammad	3	0	1	0	4
8	13	FW	(Nigeria)	Chisom Chikatara	0	0	3	0	3
8	22	FW	(India)	Beneston Barretto	0	1	2	0	3
10	8	MF	(India)	Rishad PP	1	0	0	1	2
10	13	FW	(India)	Sreekuttan VS	2	0	0	0	2
10	15	DF	(Cameroon)	Aminou Bouba	2	0	0	0	2
12	9	FW	(India)	Sourav K	0	0	1	0	1
12	11	MF	(India)	Emil Benny	1	0	0	0	1
12	16	DF	(India)	Muhammad Uvais	1	0	0	0	1
12	20	MF	(Sri Lanka)	Ahmed Waseem Razeek	1	0	0	0	1
12	42	FW	(India)	Abhijith K	0	1	0	0	1
Own Goals					1	1	0	0	2
Total					44	13	10	4	71

=== Assists ===
Not all goals have an assist.

Rank	No.	Pos.	Nat.	Name	I League	IFA Shield	Durand Cup	AFC Cup	Total
1	99	FW	(Slovenia)	Luka Majcen	7	0	0	1	8
2	11	MF	(India)	Emil Benny	3	1	1	0	5
3	18	FW	(India)	Jithin M S	2	2	0	0	4
3	22	FW	(India)	Beneston Barretto	0	1	3	0	4
3	98	FW	(Jamaica)	Jourdaine Fletcher	2	0	0	2	4
6	3	DF	(India)	Mohammed Jassim	2	0	0	1	3
6	8	MF	(India)	Rishad PP	2	0	1	0	3
6	16	DF	(India)	Muhammad Uvais	3	0	0	0	3
6	20	MF	(Sri Lanka)	Ahmed Waseem Razeek	3	0	0	0	3
6	21	MF	(Afghanistan)	Sharif Mukhammad	2	1	0	0	3
10	35	DF	(India)	Shahajaz Thekkan	2	0	0	0	2
12	1	GK	(India)	Rakshit Dagar	1	0	0	0	1
12	5	DF	(India)	Pawan Kumar	1	0	0	0	1
12	7	FW	(India)	Thahir Zaman	0	0	0	1	1
12	13	FW	(India)	Sreekuttan VS	1	0	0	0	1
12	14	MF	(India)	Zodingliana Ralte	0	1	0	0	1
12	24	DF	(India)	Abdul Hakku	1	0	0	0	1

=== Clean sheets ===
No.	Nation	Name	I-League	IFA Shield	Durand Cup	Total
1	(India)	Rakshit Dagar	7	1	0	8
33	(India)	Ajmal P. A.	0	0	1	1
TOTAL			7	1	1	9

=== Disciplinary record ===
As of match played 21 May 2022

No.	Pos.	Name	I League		IFA Shield		Durand Cup		AFC CUP		Total	
No.	Pos.	Name	Yellow card	Red card	Yellow card	Red card	Yellow card	Red card	Yellow card	Red card	Yellow card	Red card
19	FW	(Ghana) Rahim Osumanu	0	0	0	0	1	0	0	0	1	0
11	FW	(India) Emil Benny	3	0	0	0	0	1	1	0	4	1
21	MF	(Afghanistan) Sharif Mukhammad	6	1	0	0	1	0	1	0	8	1
8	MF	(India) Rishad PP	0	0	0	0	2	0	0	0	2	0
4	DF	(India) Alex Saji	1	0	0	0	1	0	0	0	2	0
12	MF	(India) Muhammed Rashid	0	0	0	0	1	0	0	0	1	0
18	MF	(India) Jithin MS	5	0	0	0	0	0	0	0	5	0
24	DF	(India) Abdul Hakku	1	0	0	0	0	0	2	0	3	0
15	DF	(Cameroon) Aminou Bouba	3	0	0	0	0	0	0	0	3	0
98	FW	(Jamaica) Jourdaine Fletcher	1	0	0	0	0	0	0	0	1	0
7	MF	(India) Thahir Zaman	1	0	0	0	0	0	0	0	1	0
99	FW	(Slovenia) Luka Majcen	1	0	0	0	0	0	0	0	1	0
20	MF	(Sri Lanka) Ahmed Waseem Razeek	1	0	0	0	0	0	0	0	1	0
3	DF	(India) Mohammed Jassim	3	0	0	0	0	0	0	0	3	0
3	DF	(India) Zodingliana Ralte	2	0	0	0	0	0	0	0	2	0
1	GK	(India) Rakshit Dagar	1	0	0	0	0	0	0	0	1	0
Total			27	1	0	0	6	1	4	0	37	2
