= Sreekuttan V. S. =

Indian football player

Sreekuttan VS
Personal information
- Full name: Sreekuttan Viruthiyil Santhosh
- Date of birth: 13 September 1998 (age 28)
- Place of birth: Thrissur, Kerala, India
- Height: 1.72 m (5 ft 8 in)
- Positions: Right winger; left winger; striker

Team information
- Current team: Inter Kashi
- Number: 41

Senior career*
Years	Team	Apps	(Gls)
2019–2020	FC Kerala	6	(1)
2020–2021	ARA	4	(0)
2021	Kerala Blasters B	5	(2)
2021–2022	Kerala Blasters	0	(0)
2022	→ Gokulam Kerala (loan)	17	(2)
2022–2024	Gokulam Kerala	38	(4)
2024–2026	Jamshedpur	3	(0)
2026–	Inter Kashi	2	(0)
- * Club domestic league appearances and goals as of 17 October 2026

Sreekuttan Viruthiyil Santhosh (born 13 September 1998) is an Indian professional footballer who plays as a forward for Indian Super League club Inter Kashi

== Club career ==
=== FC Kerala and ARA FC ===
Sreekuttan signed his first senior contract with the then I-League 2nd Division club FC Kerala in the 2019–20 I-League 2nd Division, and then joined ARA FC for the 2020 I-League Qualifiers and made four appearances for ARA in the competition before leaving the club for Kerala Blasters' reserve side in 2020.

=== Kerala Blasters FC ===
In 2020, he was signed by the reserve side of the Indian Super League club Kerala Blasters FC for the 2020–21 Kerala Premier League season. Even though the reserves failed to qualify for the knockout stages, Sreekuttan's performance in the tournament earned him a promotion to the senior side of the Kerala Blasters for the pre-season of the 2021–22 season.

Sreekuttan was one among the six players from the reserve side that was called up for the pre-season camp of the Blasters ahead of the 2021–22 Indian Super League season on 21 July 2021. He was then included in the Kerala Blasters' squad for their debut Durand Cup competition in the 2021's edition. He made his debut for the senior side of the Blasters on 15 September 2021 in the Durand Cup group stage match against arch-rivals Bengaluru FC, which they ended up losing 2–0. He made a total of two appearances for the club in the tournament, and was sent on loan to Gokulam Kerala FC.

==== Gokulam Kerala FC (loan) ====
On 23 December 2021, it was announced that Sreekuttan, along with Abdul Hakku would join the defending champions of the I-League, Gokulam Kerala on loan for the 2021–22 I-League season. He made his debut on 3 March 2022 against NEROCA FC as a substitute for Ngangom Ronald Singh in the 46th minute, which ended in a 0–0 draw. He scored his debut goal for Gokulam against RoundGlass Punjab FC on 23 April 2022, where he came in as a substitute for Luka Majcen in the first half and scored the last goal of the game in the 84th minute which ended in a 2–0 victory Gokulam. He scored his second goal of the season in a 4–0 victory over NEROCA on 3 May, where he again came in as a substitute in the early moments of the match, as he netted the ball in the added time and secured the three-points for the Malabarians. Gokulam Kerala clinched the league, defeating Mohammedan Sporting 2–1 in the final game at the Salt Lake Stadium on 14 May, and became the first club in fifteen years to defend the title.

Gokulam Kerala FC

He joined on a permanent deal with Gokulam Kerala

== Career statistics ==
=== Club ===
As of 07 April 2024

Club	Season	League			League Cup		Domestic Cup		AFC		Others		Total	
Club	Season	Division	Apps	Goals	Apps	Goals	Apps	Goals	Apps	Goals	Apps	Goals	Apps	Goals
FC Kerala	2020	I-League 2nd Division	6	1	0	0	0	0	–		0	0	6	1
ARA	2020	I-League 2nd Division	4	0	0	0	0	0	–		0	0	4	0
Kerala Blasters	2021–22	Indian Super League	0	0	0	0	2 (Note: Appearance(s) in Durand Cup)	0	–		0	0	2	0
Kerala Blasters	2022–23	Indian Super League	0	0	0	0	0	0	–		0	0	0	0
Kerala Blasters	Total		0	0	0	0	2	0	0	0	0	0	2	0
Gokulam Kerala (loan)	2021–22	I-League	17	2	0	0	0	0	3 (Note: Appearance(s) in AFC Cup)	0	0	0	20	2
Gokulam Kerala	2022–23	I-League	21	1	4 (Note: Appearance(s) in Super Cup)	0	0	0	–		1 (Note: Appearance(s) in play–offs for AFC Cup)	0	26	1
Gokulam Kerala	2023–24	I-League	17	3	3	0	4	2	—		0	0	24	5
Gokulam Kerala	Total		55	6	7	0	4	2	3	0	1	0	70	8
Inter Kashi	2024–25	I-League	0	0	0	0	–		–		0	0	0	0
Career total			65	7	7	0	6	2	3	0	1	0	82	9
