= Shahajas Thekkan =

Indian football player (born 1998)

Personal information
- Date of birth: 25 October 1998 (age 28)
- Place of birth: Perinthalmanna, Kerala, India
- Height: 1.75 m (5 ft 9 in)
- Position: Right back

Youth career
- Baselius CC
- Ozone

Senior career*
Years	Team	Apps	(Gls)
2017–2021	Kerala Blasters B	23	(2)
2021	Kerala Blasters	0	(0)
2021–2023	Gokulam Kerala	5	(0)
2023–	LUCA SC	3	(0)
- * Club domestic league appearances and goals as of 22:33, 3 May 2022 (UTC)

Shahajas Thekkan (born 25 October 1998) is an Indian professional footballer who plays as a defender.

== Club career ==
=== Kerala Blasters ===
In 2017, Shahjas signed for the reserve side of the Indian Super League side Kerala Blasters FC, and was a part of the Kerala Premier League winning side of the reserve side in the 2019–20 Kerala Premier League season. He was promoted to the senior side during the club's 2021 pre-season.

=== Gokulam Kerala ===
In October 2021, Shahajas signed for I-League club Gokulam Kerala. On 7 March 2022, he played his debut match against Real Kashmir FC as a substitute for Luka Majcen in the 84th minute of the match, which ended in a 5–1 victory for Gokulam Kerala.

== Career statistics ==
=== Club ===
As of 3 May 2022

Club	Season	League			Cup		AFC		Total	
Club	Season	Division	Apps	Goals	Apps	Goals	Apps	Goals	Apps	Goals
Kerala Blasters FC B	2017–18	I-League 2nd Division	10	1	0	0	–		10	1
Kerala Blasters FC B	2018–19	I-League 2nd Division	8	0	0	0	–		8	0
Kerala Blasters FC B	2020	I-League 2nd Division	5	1	0	0	–		5	1
Kerala Blasters FC B	Kerala Blasters B total		23	2	0	0	0	0	23	2
Gokulam Kerala	2021–22	I-League	5	0	0	0	–		5	0
Gokulam Kerala	2022–23	I-League	0	0	0	0	–		0	0
Gokulam Kerala	Gokulam Kerala total		5	0	0	0	0	0	5	0
Career total			28	2	0	0	0	0	28	2

== Honours ==
Gokulam Kerala

- I-League: 2021–22
