= Sourav K. =

Indian footballer (born 2001)

Personal information
- Full name: Sourav K.
- Date of birth: 27 May 2001 (age 25)
- Place of birth: Kannur, Kerala, India
- Position: Forward

Team information
- Current team: SC Delhi
- Number: 27

Youth career
- 2018–2020: Kerala FA

Senior career*
| Years | Team | Apps | (Gls) |
| 2021–2024 | Gokulam Kerala | | |
| 2024–2025 | Hyderabad | | |
| 2025– | SC Delhi | | |

International career
| 2019– | India | | |
- * Club domestic league appearances and goals as of 23:20, 13 March 2025 (UTC)

Sourav K. (born 27 May 2001) is an Indian professional footballer who plays as a forward for SC Delhi.

== Career ==
=== Gokulam Kerala ===
On 30 August 2021, Sourav joined I-League club Gokulam Kerala on a two-year contract.

=== Hyderabad FC ===
On 18 September 2024, Sourav joined Indian Super League club Hyderabad FC on a long-term contract. On 19 September 2024, he made his league debut coming on as a substitute against Bengaluru FC.

== International career ==
=== Youth team ===
In September 2023, Sourav was included in the final 23-member squad of the Indian under-23 national team to participate in the 2024 AFC U-23 Asian Cup qualification.

== Career statistics ==
As of 07 April 2024

Appearances and goals by club, season and competition
| Club | Season | League | | | National cup | | League cup | | AFC | | Others | | Total | |
| Club | Season | Division | Apps | Goals | Apps | Goals | Apps | Goals | Apps | Goals | Apps | Goals | Apps | Goals |
|---|---|---|---|---|---|---|---|---|---|---|---|---|---|---|
| Gokulam Kerala | 2021–22 | I-League | 8 | 0 | 4 (Note: Appearance(s) in Durand Cup) (Note: Appearance(s) in IFA Shield) | 1 | 0 | 0 | 1 (Note: Appearance(s) in AFC Cup) | 0 | 0 | 0 | 13 | 1 |
| Gokulam Kerala | 2022–23 | I-League | 6 | 0 | 0 | 0 | 4 (Note: Appearance(s) in Super Cup) | 1 | 0 | 0 | 1 (Note: Appearance(s) in play–offs for AFC Cup) | 0 | 11 | 1 |
| Gokulam Kerala | 2023–24 | I-League | 14 | 2 | 3 | 1 | 3 | 0 | 0 | 0 | 0 | 0 | 20 | 3 |
| Career total | | | 28 | 2 | 6 | 2 | 7 | 1 | 1 | 0 | 1 | 0 | 44 | 5 |

== Honours ==
Gokulam Kerala

- I-League: 2021–22
