= Deepak Singh Takhellambam =

Indian footballer

Deepak Singh
Personal information
- Full name: Deepak Singh Takhellambam
- Date of birth: 24 March 1997 (age 29)
- Place of birth: Imphal, Manipur, India
- Height: 1.78 m (5 ft 10 in)
- Position: Defender

Team information
- Current team: Gokulam Kerala
- Number: 27

Senior career*
Years	Team	Apps	(Gls)
2018–2019	TRAU	8	(0)
2019–2020	NISA	0	(0)
2020–2021	NEROCA FC	11	(0)
2021–	Gokulam Kerala	0	(0)
- * Club domestic league appearances and goals as of 27 March 2021

Deepak Singh Takhellambam (Meitei: Takhellambam Deepak Singh, born 14 March 1997) is an Indian professional footballer who plays as a defender for I-League club Gokulam Kerala.

== Career ==
=== TRAU ===
Singh started his career with I-League 2nd Division side TRAU in 2018.

=== NEROCA ===
I-League side NEROCA FC have announced the signing of defender Takhellambam Deepak Singh on a two-year deal ahead of the 2020/21 season.

=== Gokulam Kerala FC ===
On 25 June 2021, it was announced that Singh signed for Gokulam Kerala in the I-League.

== Career statistics ==
As of match played 23 September 2021

Club	Season	League			Domestic Cup		Total	
Club	Season	Division	Apps	Goals	Apps	Goals	Apps	Goal
Gokulam Kerala	2021–22	I-League	0	0	3 (Note: Durand Cup)	0	3	0
Career total			0	0	3	0	3	0

== Honours ==
TRAU

- I-League 2nd Division: 2018–19
