= Vigneshwaran Baskaran =

Indian footballer

Personal information
- Full name: Vigneshwaran Baskaran
- Date of birth: 11 April 1990 (age 36)
- Place of birth: Pudukkottai, Tamil Nadu, India
- Position: Goalkeeper

Team information
- Current team: Delhi
- Number: 1

Senior career*
| Years | Team | Apps | (Gls) |
- Fateh Hyderabad
- Sudeva Delhi
- Punjab FC
| 2017–2018 | Chennai City | 1 | (0) |
| 2018–2019 | Churchill Brothers | 6 | (0) |
| 2019 | Southern Samity | | |
| 2019–2023 | Gokulam Kerala | | |
| 2023– | Delhi | | |
- * Club domestic league appearances and goals

Vigneshwaran Baskaran (born 11 April 1990) is an Indian professional footballer hailing from Tamil Nadu, India. Vigneshwaran primarily plays for regional clubs representing the sport at national and international forums, where he distinguishes himself as a reliable goalkeeper. He began his professional senior career with Chennai City FC. In 2018, he joined Churchill Brothers SC, where he rose to prominence. Later half of 2019, he signed for Gokulam Kerala Football Club.

Vigneshwaran won the prestigious Durand Cup in 2018-2019 and won his first Indian Super League title in 2021–2022. His accomplishment is winning three consecutive national championships at I-League – a feat unprecedented in Indian football history.

== Honors ==
Gokulam Kerala

- Durand Cup: 2019
- I-League: 2021–22
- Sheikh Hasina Tournament

== Achievements ==
=== National success ===
- Three-time National Championship winner (First player in Indian football to achieve this consecutively)
- Winner of the prestigious Durand Cup Heritage Championship
- Asian Football Cup Championship victor
- Three-time representative for Tamil Nadu in the Santosh Trophy

=== International representation ===
- In his international career, Vigneshwaran earned recognition for the Indian national team, with his most significant appearance in the Sheikh Hasina Tournament hosted in Bangladesh. This tournament served as a platform for him to demonstrate his goalkeeping prowess at the international level, representing India in competitive matches against other Asian nations.

=== Professional certifications and coaching ===
- Asian Football Confederation (AFC) Certified Coach
- Union of European Football Associations (UEFA) Licensed Coach

=== Team achievements ===
- Multiple clean sheets in I-League appearances across various clubs
- Crucial role in several successful domestic campaign runs with Chennai City FC, Churchill Brothers, and Gokulam Kerala FC

== Club career ==
Vigneshwaran began his professional journey in Indian football with lower-division clubs, initially playing for Fateh Hyderabad and Sudeva Delhi before securing a move to Punjab FC. His breakthrough into the I-League came when he signed with Chennai City for the 2017–18 season. Vignesh made his professional debut on 20 January 2018 in a 0–1 defeat against Gokulam Kerala.

Following his stint at Chennai City, he transferred to Churchill Brothers ahead of the 2018–19 season. His debut for Churchill Brothers came on 15 November 2018 in a 4–2 victory over Shillong Lajong. In 2019, Vigneshwaran had a brief spell with Southern Samity in the Calcutta Football League before securing a move to I-League side Gokulam Kerala on 2 August 2019.

He made his first appearance for Gokulam Kerala on 4 January 2020 in a 1–1 draw against Aizawl.

== Early life and youth career ==
Vigneshwaran Baskaran was born in Pudukkottai (Tamil Nadu, India) into a modest family background. Throughout his youth, while he displayed natural athletic abilities across various sports at district level, his specific passion for football emerged during his tenth standard of schooling.

His first significant achievement came when he led his team to victory in the Inter-district Championship at Avadi—a historic win that marked the district's first triumph in the competition in 50 years.This early guidance proved instrumental in shaping Vigneshwaran's career trajectory.

During his college years, this initial success catalyzed a series of achievements at both district and state levels, establishing him as a promising talent in Tamil Nadu's football circuit. These formative experiences laid the groundwork for his later professional career in Indian football.

== Style of play ==
Vigneshwaran Baskaran is a goalkeeper noted for his quick reactions, strong positional sense, and instinctive decision-making, particularly when advancing off his line in one-on-one situations. His performance for Churchill Brothers in a 2019 I-League match against East Bengal, in which he saved a close-range effort from a Spanish forward, has been cited as an example of his composure under pressure and his effectiveness against opposing strikers.

He is known for his ability to command his area and play the ball with his feet. He has emphasized a science-based approach in his training and performance methods.

== Career statistics ==
As of 10 March 2023 - Matches played

Appearances and goals by club, season and competition
| Club | Season | League | | | Cup | | Continental | | Total | |
| Club | Season | Division | Apps | Goals | Apps | Goals | Apps | Goals | Apps | Goals |
|---|---|---|---|---|---|---|---|---|---|---|
| Chennai City | 2017–18 | I-League | 1 | 0 | — | — | — | — | 1 | 0 |
| Churchill Brothers | 2018–19 | I-League | 6 | 0 | — | — | — | — | 6 | 0 |
| Gokulam Kerala | 2019–20 | I-League | 2 | 0 | — | — | — | — | 2 | 0 |
| Gokulam Kerala | 2020–21 | I-League | 1 | 0 | — | — | — | — | 1 | 0 |
| Gokulam Kerala | 2021–22 | I-League | 0 | 0 | — | — | — | — | 0 | 0 |
| Gokulam Kerala | Total | | 3 | 0 | 0 | 0 | 0 | 0 | 3 | 0 |
| Delhi FC | 2022–23 | I-League 2 | 1 | 0 | — | — | — | — | 1 | 0 |
| Career total | | | 11 | 0 | 0 | 0 | 0 | 0 | 11 | |
