= Charles Anandraj =

Indian footballer

Personal information
- Full name: Charles Anandraj Lourdusamy
- Date of birth: 26 September 1991 (age 35)
- Place of birth: Vellore, Tamil Nadu, India
- Height: 1.74 m (5 ft 8 1/2 in)
- Position: Midfielder

Team information
- Current team: FC BENGALURU UNITED
- Number: 12

Senior career*
| Years | Team | Apps | (Gls) |
| 2017–2021 | Chennai City F.C. | 25 | (0) |
| 2021–2022 | Gokulam Kerala FC | 1 | (0) |
- * Club domestic league appearances and goals as of 26 December 2019

Charles Anandraj (born 26 September 1991) is an Indian professional footballer who plays as a midfielder for FC BENGALURU UNITED in the I-League2nd Division.

== Career ==
Married to Leena Priyanka R, He made his professional debut for the Chennai City F.C. against Indian Arrows on 29 November 2017, He started and played full match as Chennai City lost 3–0.

== Career statistics ==
As of 12 September 2021

| Club | Season | League | | | League Cup | | Domestic Cup | | Continental | | Total | |
| Club | Season | Division | Apps | Goals | Apps | Goals | Apps | Goals | Apps | Goals | Apps | Goals |
|---|---|---|---|---|---|---|---|---|---|---|---|---|
| Chennai City F.C. | 2017–18 | I-League | 12 | 0 | 0 | 0 | 0 | 0 | – | – | 12 | 0 |
| Chennai City F.C. | 2018–19 | I-League | 8 | 0 | 0 | 0 | 0 | 0 | – | – | 8 | 0 |
| Chennai City F.C. | 2019–20 | I-League | 5 | 0 | 0 | 0 | 0 | 0 | — | — | 5 | 0 |
| Gokulam Kerala FC | 2021–22 | I-League | 0 | 0 | 0 | 0 | 1 (Note: Appearances in Durand Cup) | 0 | 0 | 0 | 1 | 0 |
| Career total | | | 25 | 0 | 0 | 0 | 1 | 0 | 0 | 0 | 26 | 0 |
