= Emil Benny =

Indian footballer (born 2000)

Personal information
- Full name: Emil Benny
- Date of birth: 19 September 2000 (age 26)
- Place of birth: Wayanad, Kerala, India
- Positions: Attacking midfielder; winger

Team information
- Current team: Calicut
- Number: 15

Youth career
- MSP Football Academy
- Kerala Blasters B
- Gokulam Kerala B

Senior career*
Years	Team	Apps	(Gls)
2020–2022	Gokulam Kerala	32	(4)
2022–2023	NorthEast United	16	(0)
2023–2024	Jamshedpur	8	(0)
2024–2026	Gokulam Kerala	5	(0)
2026–	Calicut		
- * Club domestic league appearances and goals

Emil Benny (born 19 September 2000) is an Indian professional footballer who plays as an midfielder for Super League Kerala club Calicut.

== Club career ==
=== Gokulam Kerala ===
Born in Kerala, Emil Benny made his first professional appearance for Gokulam Kerala FC on 9 January 2021 as a 86th-minute substitute.

At the 2022 AFC Cup group-stage opener, Benny and his side achieved a historic 4–2 win against Indian Super League side ATK Mohun Bagan.

=== NorthEast United ===
On 20 August 2022, NorthEast United announced the signing of Benny from Gokulam Kerala on a multiyear deal . He made his debut for the club on 2 September against Sudeva Delhi in Durand Cup and won the match in 2–0 scoreline.

== Career statistics ==
=== Club ===
As of 9 April 2024

Club	Season	League			Cup		AFC		Total	
Club	Season	Division	Apps	Goals	Apps	Goals	Apps	Goals	Apps	Goals
Gokulam Kerala	2020–21	I-League	14	3	0	0	—		14	3
Gokulam Kerala	2021–22	I-League	18	1	8 (Note: Appearance(s) in Durand Cup) (Note: Appearance(s) in IFA Shield)	0	3 (Note: Appearance(s) in AFC Cup)	0	29	1
Gokulam Kerala	Total		32	4	8	0	3	0	43	4
NorthEast United	2022–23	Indian Super League	16	0	4 (Note: Appearance(s) in Super Cup)	0	—		20	0
Jamshedpur	2023–24	Indian Super League	8	0	0	0	—		8	0
Career total			56	4	12	0	3	0	71	4

== Honours ==
Gokulam Kerala

- I-League: 2020–21, 2021–22

Individual

- I-League emerging player of the season: 2020–21
- I-League Team of the season: 2020–21
