= Jourdaine Fletcher =

Jamaican footballer (born 1997)

Personal information
- Full name: Jourdaine Ronaldo Fletcher
- Date of birth: 23 September 1997 (age 29)
- Place of birth: St James, Jamaica
- Position: Striker

Team information
- Current team: Haiphong
- Number: 99

Youth career
- Cornwall College

College career
Years	Team	Apps	(Gls)
2017	San Jacinto Coyotes	15	(7)
2018	Eastern Florida State College Titans		

Senior career*
Years	Team	Apps	(Gls)
2016–2019	Montego Bay United	29	(2)
2019–2021	Mount Pleasant	43	(12)
2022	Gokulam Kerala	15	(9)
2022–2023	NEROCA	19	(9)
2023	Mount Pleasant	6	(1)
2023–2024	Skënderbeu	4	(0)
2024–2026	Montego Bay United	53	(23)
2026–	Haiphong	7	(0)

International career^{‡}
2017–	Jamaica	10	(2)
- * Club domestic league appearances and goals as of 7 June 2026 ‡ National team caps and goals as of 9:09, 9 February 2026 (UTC)

Jourdaine Ronaldo Fletcher (born 23 September 1997) is a Jamaican professional footballer who plays as a forward for the V.League 1 club Haiphong and the Jamaica national football team.

== Club career ==
=== Early career ===
Fletcher played for Cornwall College in Montego Bay, Jamaica, where he won the DaCosta Cup in 2016. He then played at club level with Faulkland FC and Montego Bay United.

In 2017, he played college soccer in the United States for San Jacinto College in Houston, Texas, before transferring in 2018 to Eastern Florida State College.

In September 2018, Fletcher re-signed with Montego Bay United after returning to Jamaica following trials in Malta. In January 2019, Fletcher transferred to Mount Pleasant.

=== Gokulam Kerala ===
On 20 February 2022, he signed with Indian I-League defending champions Gokulam Kerala, as the team is going to represent the country in 2022 AFC Cup. He scored a brace for the club on 7 March in their 5–1 win against Real Kashmir. After back to back wins in both the group and championship stages, the club clinched I-League title in 2021–22 season, defeating Mohammedan Sporting 2–1 in the final game at the Salt Lake Stadium on 14 May, and became the first club in fifteen years to defend the title.

At the 2022 AFC Cup group-stage opener, Fletcher played a key role as his side achieved a historic 4–2 win against Indian Super League side ATK Mohun Bagan. He scored a goal against Bangladeshi side Bashundhara Kings in their 2–1 defeat in last match before being knocked out.

=== NEROCA ===
In September 2022, Fletcher continued his stay in India and signed with I-League club NEROCA.

=== Return to Montego Bay United ===
In January 2024, Fletcher returned to Montego Bay United.

=== Haiphong ===
On 9 February 2026, Fletcher joined Haiphong for the 2025–26 season.

== International career ==
Fletcher made his international senior team debut in 2017 against the United States in a 1–0 defeat. He then scored his first goal for his country against Bermuda on 11 March 2020 in their 2–0 friendly win.

== Career statistics ==
As of 9 February 2026

Club	Season	League			Cup		Continental		Total	
Club	Season	Division	Apps	Goals	Apps	Goals	Apps	Goals	Apps	Goals
Montego Bay United	2016–17	Jamaica Premier League	10	1	0	0	–		10	1
Montego Bay United	2017–18	Jamaica Premier League	1	0	0	0	–		1	0
Montego Bay United	2018–19	Jamaica Premier League	18	1	0	0	–		18	1
Mount Pleasant	2018–19	Jamaica Premier League	11	2	0	0	–		11	2
Mount Pleasant	2019–20	Jamaica Premier League	19	4	0	0	–		19	4
Mount Pleasant	2020–21	Jamaica Premier League	13	6	0	0	–		13	6
Gokulam Kerala	2021–22	I-League	15	9	0	0	3 (Note: Appearance(s) in AFC Cup)	1	18	10
NEROCA	2022–23	I-League	19	9	0	0	–		19	9
Mount Pleasant	2022–23	Jamaica Premier League	6	1	0	0	–		6	1
Mount Pleasant	2023–24	Jamaica Premier League	11	1	0	0	–		11	1
Skënderbeu	2023–24	Kategoria Superiore	4	0	0	0	–		4	0
Montego Bay United	2024–25	Jamaica Premier League	35	11	0	0	–		35	11
Montego Bay United	2025–26	Jamaica Premier League	18	12	0	0	–		18	12
Haiphong	2025–26	V.League 1	0	0	0	0	–		0	0
Career total			170	57	0	0	3	1	183	58

== Honours ==
Gokulam Kerala

- I-League: 2021–22
