= Muhammed Rashid =

Indian footballer

Personal information
- Full name: Muhammed Rashid
- Date of birth: November 1, 1993 (age 33)
- Place of birth: Wayanad, Kerala, India
- Position: Midfielder

Team information
- Current team: Calicut
- Number: 12

Senior career*
Years	Team	Apps	(Gls)
2017−2022	Gokulam Kerala	42	(2)
2022	Gokulam Kerala B	44	(2)
2022−2024	Kenkre		
2024−2025	Diamond Harbour	15	(0)
2026−	Calicut	0	(0)
- * Club domestic league appearances and goals

Muhammed Rashid (born November 1, 1993) is an Indian professional football midfielder who plays for Calicut.

== Career statistics ==
As of 23 September 2021

Club	Season	League			League Cup		Domestic Cup		Continental		Total	
Club	Season	Division	Apps	Goals	Apps	Goals	Apps	Goals	Apps	Goals	Apps	Goals
Gokulam Kerala	2017–18	I-League	13	0	—	—	0	0	0	0	13	0
Gokulam Kerala	2018–19	I-League	10	0	1 (Note: Appearances in Indian Super Cup)	—	0	0	0	0	11	0
Gokulam Kerala	2019–20	I-League	4	0	—	—	3 (Note: Appearances in Durand Cup)	0	4 (Note: Appearances in Sheikh Kamal International Club Cup)	0	11	0
Gokulam Kerala	2020–21	I-League	8	1	0	0	3 (Note: Appearances in IFA Shield)	0	0	0	11	1
Gokulam Kerala	2021–22	I-League	0	0	0	0	2	0	0	0	2	0
Gokulam Kerala	Total		35	1	1	0	8	0	4	0	48	1

== Honours ==
Gokulam Kerala

- Durand Cup: 2019
- I-League: 2020–21
