= Rishad P. P. =

Indian footballer

Rishad P.P.
Personal information
- Full name: Rishad Pazhaya Puthanveettil
- Date of birth: 6 July 1995 (age 31)
- Place of birth: Malappuram, Kerala, India
- Position: Midfielder

Team information
- Current team: Malappuram FC
- Number: 8

Youth career
- SAT Tirur Academy
- DSK Shivajians Academy
- Mumbai U19

Senior career*
Years	Team	Apps	(Gls)
2016–2018	Delhi United	12	(0)
- Gokulam Kerala B
2021–2026	Gokulam Kerala	50	(3)
- * Club domestic league appearances and goals as of September 2026 (UTC)

Rishad Pazhaya Puthanveettil (born 6 July 1995) is an Indian professional footballer who plays as a midfielder.

== Club career ==
=== Gokulam Kerala ===
On 7 August 2020, Rishad joined I-League club Gokulam Kerala on a two-year contract. He made his debut for the club in the 2021 Durand Cup, on 12 September 2021, against Army Red, which ended in a 2–2 draw, coming on as a 39th-minute substitute. On 3 March 2022, he made his I-League debut, against NEROCA, which ended in a 0–0 stalemate.

At the 2022 AFC Cup group-stage opener, Rishad and his side achieved a historic 4–2 win against Indian Super League side ATK Mohun Bagan, in which he scored a goal.On 20th June 2023 Rishad signed a new contract, keeping him at the club until 2023-24 Season.

== Career statistics ==
=== Club ===
As of 20 March 2026

Club	Season	League			Cup		AFC		Total	
Club	Season	Division	Apps	Goals	Apps	Goals	Apps	Goals	Apps	Goals
Delhi United	2016–17	I-League 2nd Division	8	0	0	0	—		8	0
Delhi United	2017–18	I-League 2nd Division	4	0	0	0	—		4	0
Gokulam Kerala	2021–22	I-League	14	1	7 (Note: Appearance(s) in Durand Cup) (Note: Appearance(s) in IFA Shield)	0	3 (Note: Appearance(s) in AFC Cup)	1	24	2
Gokulam Kerala	2022–23	I-League	0	0	0	0	0	0	0	0
Gokulam Kerala	2023–24	I-League	19	0	2 (Note: Appearance(s) in Super Cup)	0	0	0	21	0
Gokulam Kerala	2024–25	I-League	14	1	0	0	0	0	14	1
Gokulam Kerala	2025–26	I-League	3	0	3	0	0	0	6	0
Gokulam Kerala	Gokulam Kerala total		50	2	12	0	3	1	65	3
Career total			60	2	12	0	3	1	76	3

== Honours ==
Gokulam Kerala

- I-League: 2021–22
