= Aminou Bouba =

Cameroonian footballer (born 1991)

Personal information
- Date of birth: 28 January 1991 (age 35)
- Place of birth: Garoua, Cameroon
- Height: 1.93 m (6 ft 4 in)
- Position: Centre-back

Team information
- Current team: Gokulam Kerala

Youth career
- 2007–2012: Coton

Senior career*
Years	Team	Apps	(Gls)
2012–2014	Coton	24	(0)
2014–2015	Espérance	8	(1)
2014	→ Constantine (loan)	11	(0)
2015–2016	Al-Khaleej	24	(4)
2016–2017	Al-Ettifaq	23	(1)
2018	Al-Tai	10	(2)
2018–2019	Feutcheu	0	(0)
2019–2021	Horoya	0	(0)
2021–2024	Gokulam Kerala	51	(3)
2024–2025	Real Kashmir	20	(3)
2026–	Gokulam Kerala	0	(0)

International career
2013	Cameroon	3	(0)
- * Club domestic league appearances and goals as of 22:33, 7 April 2024 (UTC)

Aminou Bouba (born 28 January 1991) is a Cameroonian professional footballer who plays as a defender for Indian Football League club Gokulam Kerala.

== Club career ==
=== Earlier career ===
Bouba began his club football career at Cameroonian side Coton FC de Garouain 2012. After playing there for three years, Bouba moved to Tunisian club Espérance Sportive de Tunis. He later moved to Algerian league outfit CS Constantine, and later played for multiple Saudi Professional League clubs – Al-Khaleej, Al-Ettifaq, and Al-Tai. With Khaleej, he scored 4 goals in 24 league matches. He then moved back to his country and appeared with Bandjoun.

In 2019, he signed with Guinean Ligue 1 Pro side Horoya.

=== Gokulam Kerala ===
On 26 August 2021, it was announced that defending I-League champions Gokulam Kerala have completed the signing of Bouba.

"I am glad to play in India. I have played in different leagues in various countries and I look forward to a successful stint at Gokulam Kerala FC. The club has a huge profile and I would love to contribute to the successes here."

— Aminou Bouba, after signing with Gokulam Kerala.

Bouba made his debut for the club in the 2021 Durand Cup, on 12 September 2021, against Army Red, which ended in a 2–2 draw. On 26 December 2021, he made his I-League debut against Churchill Brothers, which ended in a narrow 1–0 win.

On 5 April 2022, he scored his first goal for the club against Sreenidi Deccan, in a 2–1 win, through a header. After back to back wins in both the group and championship stages, Gokulam Kerala clinched I-League in 2021–22 season, defeating Mohammedan Sporting 2–1 in the final game at the Salt Lake Stadium on 14 May, and became the first club in fifteen years to defend the title. Bouba captained his side in the final match.

At the 2022 AFC Cup group-stage opener, Bouba and his side achieved a historic 4–2 win against Indian Super League side ATK Mohun Bagan. Later, they were defeated 1–0 by Maldivian side Maziya S&RC, and 1–2 by Bashundhara Kings of Bangladesh respectively, and knocked out of the tournament.

=== Real Kashmir ===
In November 2024, Bouba moved to another I-League club Real Kashmir.

== International career ==
Bouba made his senior international debut for Cameroon on 16 November 2012 against Indonesia in their 0–0 draw.

== Career statistics ==
=== Club ===
As of 6 April 2025

Club	Season	League			Cup		Continental		Total	
Club	Season	Division	Apps	Goals	Apps	Goals	Apps	Goals	Apps	Goals
Coton Sport	2013	Cameroonian Elite One	–	–	–	–	7 (Note: Appearance(s) in CAF Champions League)	0	7	0
Espérance	2013–14	Tunisian Ligue 1	6	1	1 (Note: Appearance(s) in Tunisian Cup)	0	2	0	9	1
Constantine	2014–15	Algerian Ligue 1	11	0	1 (Note: Appearance(s) in Algerian Cup)	0	–		12	0
Al Khaleej	2014–15	Saudi Professional League	11	3	1 (Note: Appearance(s) in Saudi Crown Prince Cup)	0	–		12	3
Al Khaleej	2015–16	Saudi Professional League	19	3	3 (Note: Appearance(s) in King Cup)	0	–		22	3
Al Khaleej	Total		30	6	4	0	0	0	34	6
Al Ettifaq	2016–17	Saudi Professional League	23	1	2	1	–		25	2
Al-Tai	2017–18	Saudi Professional League	2	0	0	0	–		2	0
Gokulam Kerala	2021–22	I-League	18	2	9 (Note: Appearance(s) in Durand Cup) (Note: Appearance(s) in IFA Shield)	0	3 (Note: Appearance(s) in AFC Cup)	0	30	2
Gokulam Kerala	2022–23	I-League	21	1	5 (Note: Appearance(s) in Super Cup) (Note: Appearance(s) in play–offs for AFC Cup)	0	–		26	1
Gokulam Kerala	2023–24	I-League	12	0	7	2	–		19	2
Gokulam Kerala	Total		51	3	21	2	3	0	75	5
Real Kashmir	2024–25	I-League	20	3	0	0	–		20	3
Gokulam Kerala	2025–26	Indian Football League	0	0	0	0	–		0	0
Career total			136	14	29	3	12	0	177	17

=== International ===
As of matches played till 26 August 2013

National team	Year	Apps	Goals
Cameroon	2013	3	0
Total		3	0

==== International goals ====
Scores and results list Cameroon's goal tally first

No.	Date	Venue	Cap	Opponent	Score	Result	Competition	Ref.
1.	20 December 2013	Stade de Franceville, Franceville, Gabon	6	Congo	1–2	1–2	2013 CEMAC Cup	(Note: Non-FIFA match)

== Honours ==
Coton

- Elite One: 2013

Espérance Tunis

- Tunisian Ligue Professionnelle 1: 2013–14

Horoya

- Guinée Championnat National: 2018–19

Gokulam Kerala

- I-League: 2021–22

Individual

- I-League best defender of the season: 2021–22
