= Sharif Mukhammad =

Afghan footballer

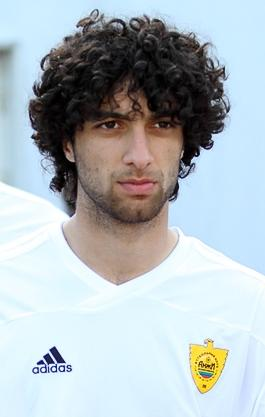
- Mukhammad with Anzhi Makhachkala in 2011

Personal information
- Full name: Sharif Khamayuni Mukhammad
- Date of birth: 21 March 1990 (age 36)
- Place of birth: Makhachkala, Russian SFSR, Soviet Union
- Height: 1.85 m (6 ft 1 in)
- Position: Midfielder

Youth career
- –2007: Makhachkala U19
- 2007–2010: Dynamo Makhachkala

Senior career*
Years	Team	Apps	(Gls)
2010–2012	Anzhi 2	82	(14)
2012–2015	Anzhi	20	(0)
2016–2017	Spartak Nalchik	36	(1)
2017–2018	AFC Eskilstuna	8	(0)
2018–2019	PSMS	0	(0)
2019	Karmiotissa	0	(0)
2019–2020	Maziya	5	(0)
2020–2022	Gokulam FC	37	(8)
2022–2023	Churchill Brothers	16	(1)
2024	SKA Rostov		
2024	Abu Muslim		
2024	SKA Rostov		
2025–2026	Abu Muslim		

International career^{‡}
2015–2026	Afghanistan	35	(3)
- * Club domestic league appearances and goals as of 4 November 2026 (UTC) ‡ National team caps and goals as of 4 November 2026

Sharif Khamayuni Mukhammad (Russian: Шариф Хамаюни Мухаммад, Dari: شریف محمد; born 21 March 1990) is a Afghan former professional footballer.

== Early life ==
He was born and raised in Makhachkala. He is of mixed Daghestani and Afghan descent. His younger brother, Amir Mokhammad, was also a football player of FC Anzhi Makhachkala.

== Club career ==
=== Anzhi Makhachkala ===
He made his Russian Premier League debut on 10 July 2010 for Anzhi Makhachkala in a game against Lokomotiv Moscow.

=== Spartak Nalchik ===
Mukhammad signed in July a 1-year contract with Spartak Nalchik. He was given shirt number 17. He eventually made his debut on 23 July for Spartak Nalchik against Sokol Saratov in the FNL. With Spartak, he appeared in 34 league matches, scoring 1 goal.

=== AFC Eskilstuna ===
He joined the Swedish club AFC Eskilstuna on 17 August 2017.

=== Karmiotissa ===
In January 2019, Sharif got recruited by Cypriot club Karmiotissa for the season 2018–19 season.

=== Maziya ===
In December 2019, Sharif signed for Maldives Champions Maziya S&RC for the Dhivehi Premier League and AFC Cup. He appeared in 10 league matches and Maziya secured the league title on 19 January 2020.

=== Gokulam Kerala ===
In November 2020, Sharif signed for Indian club Gokulam Kerala FC in the I-League. On 25 January 2021, Sharif scored from the spot kick in I-League against NEROCA FC and Gokulam won that game 4–1. On 27 March 2021, Sharif won the I-League title with Gokulam Kerala after scoring from an important free kick against TRAU FC. After winning the title with 29 points in 15 games, they qualified for the 2022 AFC Cup group stages.

On 28 May 2021, Gokulam Kerala extended the contract with Sherif for another season, as the team is set to represent the country in 2022 AFC Cup. He also appeared in the 2021 Durand Cup and Gokulam reached to the quarter-finals.

He scored the first goal of 2021–22 season of I-League in their 1–0 win against Churchill Brothers on 26 December. After back to back wins in both the group and championship stages under his captaincy, the club clinched I-League title again in 2021–22 season, defeating Mohammedan Sporting 2–1 in the final game at the Salt Lake Stadium on 14 May, and became the first club in fifteen years to defend the title.

At the 2022 AFC Cup group-stage opener, Mukhammad and his side achieved a historic 4–2 win against Indian Super League side ATK Mohun Bagan. Later, they were defeated 1–0 by Maldivian side Maziya S&RC, and 1–2 by Bashundhara Kings of Bangladesh respectively, and knocked out of the tournament.

== International career ==
Mukhammad made his debut for Afghanistan against Japan in a World Cup qualification match. He played the whole game but lost with 5–0. He scored his first goal for Afghanistan against Singapore on 23 March 2017. On 28 December 2018, he scored his second international goal against Turkmenistan in a 2–2 draw match.

== Career statistics ==
=== Club ===
As of match played 11 March 2023

Club	Season	League			National Cup		Continental		Total	
Club	Season	Division	Apps	Goals	Apps	Goals	Apps	Goals	Apps	Goals
Anzhi Makhachkala	2010	Russian Premier League	2	0	0	0	—		2	0
Anzhi Makhachkala	2011–12	Russian Premier League	5	0	1	0	—		6	0
Anzhi Makhachkala	2012–13	Russian Premier League	3	0	0	0	—		3	0
Anzhi Makhachkala	2013–14	Russian Premier League	3	0	1	0	—		4	0
Anzhi Makhachkala	2014–15	Russian National League	6	0	0	0	—		6	0
Anzhi Makhachkala	Total		19	0	2	0	0	0	21	0
Anzhi Makhachkala II	2014–15	Russian Professional League	3	0	—		—		3	0
Spartak Nalchik	2016–17	Russian National League	24	1	2	0	—		26	1
Gokulam Kerala	2020–21	I-League	14	4	0	0	—		14	4
Gokulam Kerala	2021–22	I-League	16	3	7 (Note: Appearance(s) in Durand Cup) (Note: Appearance(s) in IFA Shield)	1	3 (Note: Appearance(s) in AFC Cup)	0	26	4
Gokulam Kerala	Gokulam total		30	7	7	1	3	0	40	8
Churchill Brothers	2022–23	I-League	16	1	0	0	—		16	1
Career total			92	9	11	1	3	0	106	10

=== International ===
Statistics accurate as of match played 29 March 2024

Afghanistan national team
Year	Apps	Goals
2015	1	0
2016	1	0
2017	7	1
2018	4	1
2019	7	0
2021	5	0
2022	3	0
2024	2	1
Total	30	3

=== International goals ===
Scores and results list Afghanistan's goal tally first.

No.	Date	Venue	Opponent	Score	Result	Competition
1.	23 March 2017	Saoud bin Abdulrahman Stadium, Al Wakrah, Qatar	Singapore	1–0	2–1	Friendly
2.	28 December 2018	Miracle Hotel Resort, Antalya, Turkey	Turkmenistan	?–?	2–2	Friendly
3.	26 March 2024	Indira Gandhi Athletic Stadium, Guwahati, India	India	2–1	2–1	2026 FIFA World Cup qualification

== Honours ==
Maziya S&RC

- Dhivehi Premier League: 2019–20

Gokulam Kerala

- I-League: 2020–21, 2021–22
