= Mohammed Jasim =

Indian footballer

Personal information
- Full name: Mohammed Jasim Paravakkal
- Date of birth: 26 November 1996 (age 29)
- Place of birth: Malappuram, Kerala, India
- Position: Left back

Team information
- Current team: Calicut

Youth career
- Malabar Special Police Academy
- Vasco

Senior career*
Years	Team	Apps	(Gls)
2020–2023	Gokulam Kerala	29	(0)
2023–2026	Mohammedan	11	(1)
2026–	Calicut		
- * Club domestic league appearances and goals

Mohammed Jasim (born 26 November 1996) is an Indian professional footballer who plays as a defender for Super League Kerala club Calicut. A versatile player who mainly plays as a center back, Jasim can also be deployed as a left back

== Club career ==
Born in Malappuram, Kerala, Jasim began his career with the Malabar Special Police Academy after impressing for the Kerala youth teams. He would soon move to Goa and join Goa Professional League club Vasco.

=== Gokulam Kerala ===
Prior to the 2020–21 season, Jasim joined I-League club Gokulam Kerala. He made his professional debut for the club on 25 January 2021 against NEROCA, coming on as a last-minute substitute in a 4–1 victory.

== Career statistics ==
=== Club ===
As of 18 April 2023

Club	Season	League			League Cup		Domestic Cup		AFC		Others		Total	
Club	Season	Division	Apps	Goals	Apps	Goals	Apps	Goals	Apps	Goals	Apps	Goals	Apps	Goals
Gokulam Kerala	2020–21	I-League	2	0	0	0	0	0	—		0	0	2	0
Gokulam Kerala	2021–22	I-League	13	0	0	0	4 (Note: Appearance(s) in Durand Cup) (Note: Appearance(s) in IFA Shield)	0	1	0	0		18	0
Gokulam Kerala	2022–23	I-League	14	0	4 (Note: Appearance(s) in Super Cup)	0	0	0	—		1 (Note: Appearance(s) in play–offs for AFC Cup)	0	19	0
Career total			29	0	4	0	4	0	1	0	1	0	39	0

== Honours ==
Gokulam Kerala

- I-League: 2020–21
