= Thahir Zaman =

Indian footballer

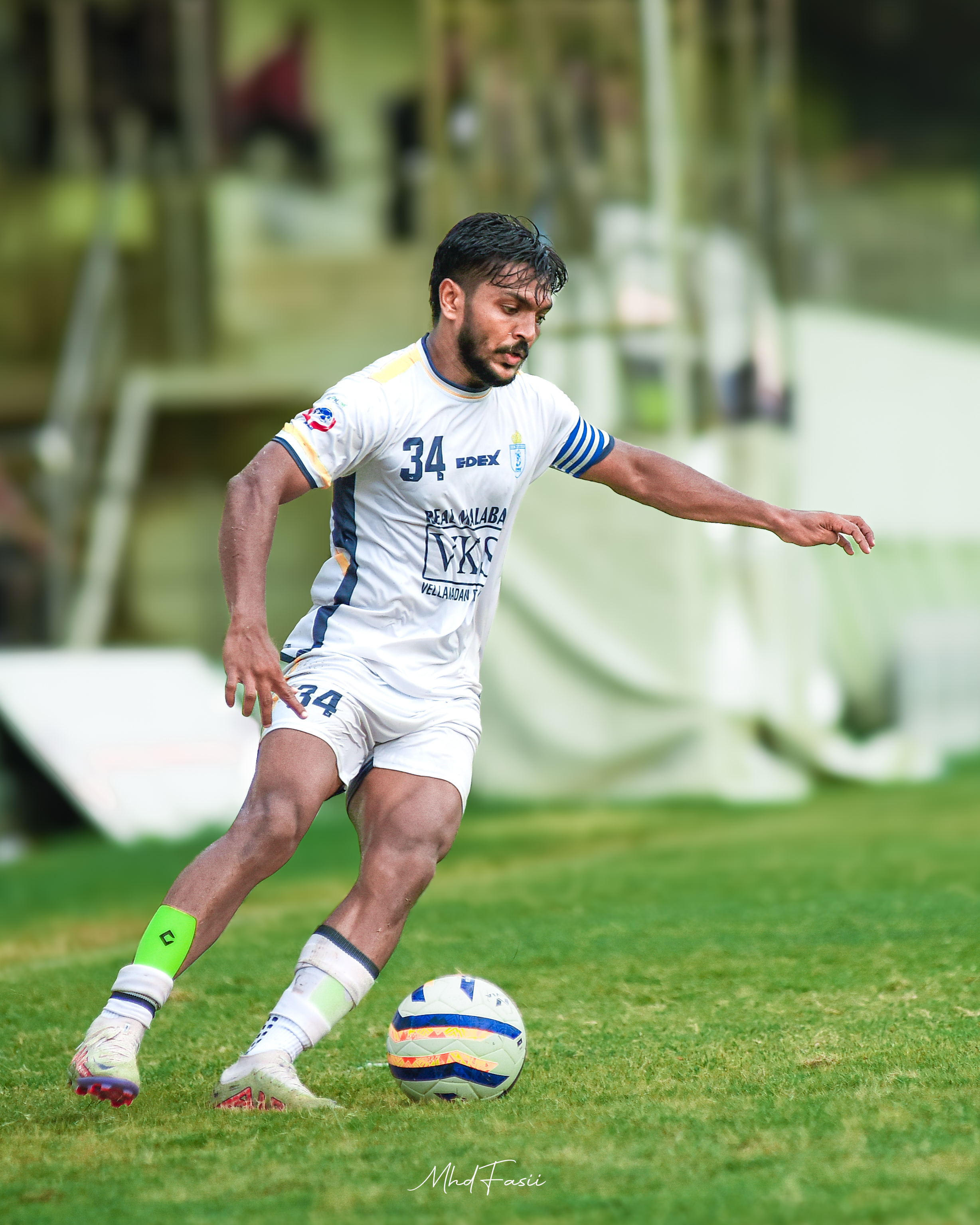
- Zaman playing for Real Malabar

Personal information
- Full name: Thahir Zaman Kolochalil
- Date of birth: 10 May 1995 (age 31)
- Place of birth: Koduvally, Kerala, India
- Height: 1.75 m (5 ft 9 in)
- Position: Right winger

Senior career*
Years	Team	Apps	(Gls)
2021–2023	Gokulam Kerala	43	(8)
2023-2024	Real Malabar FC	3	(0)
2024	Calicut FC	4	(0)
2026	EMEA College	2	(3)
- * Club domestic league appearances and goals

Thahir Zaman Kolochalil (born 10 May 1995) is an Indian professional footballer who plays as a Striker for Kerala Premier League club EMEA College.

== Career ==
=== Gokulam Kerala F.C. ===
Born in, Calicut, Kerala, India Zaman made his first professional appearance with Gokulam Kerala FC against Chennai City FC on 9 January 2021 as a substitute for Sebastian Thangmuansang in the 45th minute of the game. The match ended 1–2 to Chennai City F.C.

== Career statistics ==
=== Club ===
As of 29 April 2023

Club	Season	League			League Cup		Domestic Cup		AFC		Others		Total	
Club	Season	Division	Apps	Goals	Apps	Goals	Apps	Goals	Apps	Goals	Apps	Goals	Apps	Goals
Gokulam Kerala	2020–21	I-League	8	0	0	0	0	0	—		0	0	8	0
Gokulam Kerala	2021–22	I-League	15	5	0	0	3 (Note: Appearance(s) in Durand Cup)	0	3 (Note: Appearance(s) in AFC Cup)	0	0	0	21	5
Gokulam Kerala	2022–23	I-League	20	3	4 (Note: Appearance(s) in Super Cup)	1	0	0	—		1 (Note: Appearance(s) in play–offs for AFC Cup)	0	25	4
Gokulam Kerala	Gokulam Kerala total		43	8	4	1	3	0	3	0	1	0	53	9
Career total			43	8	4	1	3	0	3	0	1	0	53	9

== Honours ==
Gokulam Kerala

- I-League: 2020–21, 2021–22

Calicut FC

- Super League Kerala: 2024

== Education ==
- BA English- Farook College 2014–2017
