= Jithin M. S. =

Indian footballer

Jithin MS
Personal information
- Full name: Jithin Madathil Subran
- Date of birth: 16 January 1998 (age 28)
- Place of birth: Thrissur, Kerala, India
- Height: 1.73 m (5 ft 8 in)
- Position: Winger

Team information
- Current team: NorthEast United
- Number: 80

Youth career
- –2016: Kerala State Football Team

Senior career*
| Years | Team | Apps | (Gls) |
| 2016–2017 | FC Kerala | 6 | (3) |
| 2017–2019 | Kerala Blasters B | 5 | (0) |
| 2018–2019 | → Ozone (loan) | 0 | (0) |
| 2020–2022 | Gokulam Kerala | 23 | (5) |
| 2022– | NorthEast United | 62 | (8) |

International career^{‡}
| 2024– | India | 4 | (0) |
Medal record
Representing India
Men's Football
CAFA Nations Cup
| Third place | 2025 Tajikistan–Uzbekistan | Team |
- * Club domestic league appearances and goals as of 16:37, 1 March 2026 (UTC) ‡ National team caps and goals as of 22:32, 8 September 2025 (UTC)

Jithin Madathil Subran (born 16 January 1998) is an Indian professional footballer who plays as a forward for Indian Super League club NorthEast United and the India national team.

== Club career ==
Jithin studied in Sree Kerala Varma College, Thrissur.The attacker has represented Kerala football team in Santosh Trophy.

=== FC Kerala ===
Jithin MS started his career with F.C. Kerala in 2016.

=== Kerala Blasters Reserves ===
After a successful campaign in Kerala Premier League. Jithin MS was signed by Kerala Blasters FC by paying a transfer fee to F.C. Kerala. He appeared for the Kerala Blasters B in I-League 2nd Division but never went on to play for the first team. He was loaned to Ozone F.C. in 2018.

=== Gokulam Kerala ===
Gokulam Kerala signed Jithin MS on free transfer from Kerala Blasters FC in 2019. On 9 January 2021, Jithin made his first appearance for Gokulam Kerala FC as a 74th-minute substitute. In the 2021–22 I-League season, he scored a goal against Real Kashmir in their 5–1 win.

At the 2022 AFC Cup group-stage opener, Jithin MS and his side achieved a historic 4–2 win against Indian Super League side ATK Mohun Bagan, in which he scored a goal.

=== NorthEast United ===
On 18 August 2022, Jithin Joined NorthEast United on a 3 years deal. He made his debut for the club on 2 September against Sudeva Delhi, coming on as a 61st-minute substitute for Sandeep Thapa and NorthEast United won the match in 2–0 scoreline.

== Career statistics ==
=== Club ===
As of match played 1 March 2026

Appearances and goals by club, season and competition
| Club | Season | League | | | Super Cup | | Others | | Continental | | Total | |
| Club | Season | Division | Apps | Goals | Apps | Goals | Apps | Goals | Apps | Goals | Apps | Goals |
|---|---|---|---|---|---|---|---|---|---|---|---|---|
| FC Kerala | 2017–18 | I-League 2nd Division | 6 | 3 | – | | – | | – | | 6 | 3 |
| Kerala Blasters B | 2018–19 | I-League 2nd Division | 5 | 0 | – | | – | | – | | 5 | 0 |
| Gokulam Kerala | 2019–20 | I-League | 0 | 0 | – | | – | | – | | 0 | 0 |
| Gokulam Kerala | 2020–21 | I-League | 6 | 1 | – | | 3 (Note: Appearance(s) in IFA Shield) | 1 | – | | 9 | 2 |
| Gokulam Kerala | 2021–22 | I-League | 17 | 4 | – | | 8 (Note: Appearance(s) in Durand Cup) | 1 | 3 (Note: Appearance(s) in AFC Cup) | 1 | 28 | 6 |
| Gokulam Kerala | Total | | 23 | 5 | 0 | 0 | 11 | 2 | 3 | 1 | 37 | 8 |
| NorthEast United | 2022–23 | Indian Super League | 16 | 1 | 4 | 1 | 1 | 0 | – | | 21 | 2 |
| NorthEast United | 2023–24 | Indian Super League | 20 | 4 | 3 | 1 | 4 | 0 | – | | 27 | 5 |
| NorthEast United | 2024–25 | Indian Super League | 23 | 2 | 2 | 1 | 6 | 4 | – | | 31 | 7 |
| NorthEast United | 2025–26 | Indian Super League | 3 | 1 | 2 | 0 | 0 | 0 | – | | 5 | 1 |
| NorthEast United | Total | | 62 | 8 | 11 | 3 | 11 | 4 | 0 | 0 | 84 | 15 |
| Career total | | | 96 | 16 | 11 | 3 | 22 | 6 | 3 | 1 | 132 | 26 |

=== International ===
As of 8 September 2025

| National team | Year | Apps | Goals |
|---|---|---|---|
India
| India | 2024 | 1 | 0 |
| India | 2025 | 3 | 0 |
| Total | | 4 | 0 |

== Honours ==
Kerala State Football Team

- Santosh Trophy: 2017–18

Gokulam Kerala

- I-League: 2020–21, 2021–22

NorthEast United

- Durand Cup: 2024, 2025

Individual

- Durand Cup Golden Ball: 2024
