= Rahim Osumanu =

Ghanaian footballer

Personal information
- Full name: Rahim Osumanu
- Date of birth: 22 May 1995 (age 31)
- Place of birth: Accra, Ghana
- Height: 1.81 m (5 ft 11 1/2 in)
- Position: Striker

Senior career*
Years	Team	Apps	(Gls)
2016–2018	Mufulira Wanderers		
2018	Buildcon	25	(12)
2018–2019	ZESCO United	9	(2)
2019–2020	Mufulira Wanderers		
2020	ASO Chlef		
2020–2021	Jimma Aba Jifar	0	(0)
2021	Gokulam Kerala	1	(0)
2022	Gokulam Kerala (R)	6	(2)
- * Club domestic league appearances and goals

Rahim Osumanu (born 5 May 1995) is a Ghanaian professional footballer who plays as a striker.

== Club career ==
=== Zesco United ===
Osumanu signed for Zesco United in their CAF Champions League squad.

=== ASO Chlef ===
Osumanu completed a move to Algerian top-flight side ASO Chlef on a free transfer.

=== Jimma Aba Jifar ===
Osumanu signed Ethiopian outfit Jimma Aba Jifar on a free transfer.

=== Gokulam Kerala ===
In August 2021, Osumanu signed for Indian club Gokulam Kerala FC in the I-League. He made his debut in their 1–0 win against Churchill Brothers on 26 December.

== Career statistics ==
As of match played 26 December 2021

Appearances and goals by club, season and competition
Club	Season	League			Cup		Continental		Total	
Club	Season	Division	Apps	Goals	Apps	Goals	Apps	Goals	Apps	Goals
Gokulam Kerala	2021–22	I-League	1	0	9 (Note: Appearances in Durand Cup) (Note: Appearances in IFA Shield)	8	0	0	10	8
Career total			1	0	9	8	0	0	10	8
