= Ronald Singh Ngangom =

Indian footballer

Ronald Singh
Personal information
- Full name: Ronald Singh Ngangom
- Date of birth: 4 February 1997 (age 29)
- Place of birth: Manipur, India
- Position: Forward

Team information
- Current team: Bengaluru United
- Number: 10

Senior career*
Years	Team	Apps	(Gls)
2015–2020	NEROCA	4	(2)
2020–2023	Gokulam Kerala	16	(2)
2023–	Bengaluru United		
- * Club domestic league appearances and goals as of 01 April 2022

Ronald Singh Ngangom (Meitei: Ngangom Ronald Singh, born 4 February 1997) is an Indian professional footballer who plays as a forward for FC Bengaluru United in the I-League 2.

== Career ==
Born in Manipur, Singh began his career with NEROCA when they were in I-League 2nd Division. He was part of the NEROCA side that earned promotion from the 2nd Division during the 2016–17 season.

On 9 December 2017, Singh made his professional debut with NEROCA in the I-League against Gokulam Kerala. He came on as an 87th-minute substitute and proceeded to score NEROCA's third goal in the 96th minute as the club won the match 3–0. In NEROCA's next match, on 15 December, Singh would again come off the bench and score. He came on as a 77th-minute substitute during their match against Chennai City and then scored the winning goal two minutes into stoppage time to give NEROCA a 2–1 victory.

== Career statistics ==
As of 1 April 2022

Club	Season	League			League Cup		Domestic Cup		Continental		Total	
Club	Season	Division	Apps	Goals	Apps	Goals	Apps	Goals	Apps	Goals	Apps	Goals
NEROCA	2017–18	I-League	4	2	0	0	0	0	—	—	4	2
Gokulam Kerala	2020–21	I-League	11	1	0	0	3 (Note: Appearances in IFA Shield)	0	—	—	14	1
Gokulam Kerala	2021–22	I-League	5	1	0	0	7 (Note: Appearances in Durand Cup)	3	0	0	12	4
Gokulam Kerala	Total		16	2	0	0	10	3	0	0	26	5
Career total			20	4	0	0	10	3	0	0	30	7

== Honours ==
NEROCA

- I-League 2nd Division: 2016–17

Gokulam Kerala

- I-League: 2020–21, 2021–22
