= 2021–22 I-League =

15th season of the I-League

Hero I-League
- Season: 2021–22
- Dates: 26 December 2021 – 14 May 2022
- Champions: Gokulam Kerala; 2nd I-League title 2nd Indian title
- Matches: 114
- Goals: 294 (2.58 per match)
- Top goalscorer: Marcus Joseph (15 goals)
- Best goalkeeper: Bhaskar Roy
- Highest scoring: Gokulam Kerala 6–2 Kenkre (12 March 2022)
- Longest winning run: Gokulam Kerala (6 games)
- Longest unbeaten run: Gokulam Kerala (16 games)
- Longest winless run: Kenkre (12 games)
- Longest losing run: Kenkre (6 games)
- Total attendance: 38,650
- Average attendance: 1,074

The 2021–22 I-League (also known as Hero I-League for sponsorship reasons) was the 15th season of I-League, last as the top tier of Indian football league system, since its establishment in 2007. All the matches were hosted in a bio-secure bubble in West Bengal due to COVID-19 pandemic in India.

After the commencement of the first match-week of the league on 27 December 2021, the tournament got suspended on 29 December due to reports of numerous COVID-19 cases among the players and staff. All India Football Federation released new dates on 1 February 2022, with a revised schedule of the league resuming from 3 March.

The AIFF allowed spectators in the second phase of the league. On final matchday, with only a draw needed, Gokulam Kerala defeated Mohammedan by 2–1 to successfully defend the title, becoming the first team to do so in I-League and first time in 14 years to do so in the Indian football league's history.

== Changes from last season ==
=== Number of clubs ===
The total number of clubs participating increased from 11 in the previous season to 13 in this season.

In 2020 the AIFF issued an invitation to accept bids for new clubs from non I-League cities, like Delhi, Gangtok, Ranchi, Jaipur, Jodhpur, Mangalore, Bhopal, Lucknow, Kanpur, Ahmedabad and Calicut among many others, to join the league from 2020 onwards. The invitation mentioned that the entity which wins the bid will be granted the right to own and operate a new football club. On 12 August 2020, the AIFF announced that Sreenidi Deccan, which is based in Visakhapatnam would join from this season.

On 4 December 2021, the AIFF replaced Chennai City by Kenkre.

==== Promoted clubs ====
Promoted from the 2021 I-League Qualifiers

- Rajasthan United
- Kenkre (Note: Chennai City was barred from participation in the league on failing to comply with club licensing regulations, therefore Kenkre, the runner-up of 2021 I-League Qualifiers, replaced them)

Through Direct entry

- Sreenidi Deccan

==== Relegated clubs ====
Relegated from the 2020–21 I-League

- None (Note: Viewing the deprecating financial conditions of the many clubs during the COVID-19 pandemic, the AIFF decided to withdraw relegation for a season.)

== Format ==
Due to the COVID-19 pandemic, the tournament's format was shortened last season, and the same format is being followed. All teams will face each other once in the first leg of the league, then they will be divided into two different groups. According to points table from first leg, top seven teams will face each other once again in the Championship stage, where the team with most points (cumulative points collected from all seventeen matches) will be declared the winner of the league and qualify for the Playoffs for 2023–24 AFC Cup group stage. The other six teams will play against each other in a Relegation stage where the team with the lowest points (cumulative points collected from all sixteen matches) will be relegated to 2nd Division League.

== Teams ==
Locations of current I-League clubs

Locations of the stadiums for I-league

=== Stadiums and locations ===
AIFF declared West Bengal as the venue for the second straight season on 26 June, with all matches being played at Kalyani Stadium in Kalyani and Naihati Stadium in Naihati. The final match of the league was later rescheduled to be hosted at Vivekananda Yuba Bharati Krirangan.

| Team | Location |
|---|---|
| Aizawl | Aizawl, Mizoram |
| Churchill Brothers | Margao, Goa |
| Gokulam Kerala | Calicut, Kerala |
| Indian Arrows | Bhubaneswar, Odisha |
| Kenkre | Mumbai, Maharashtra |
| Mohammedan | Kolkata, West Bengal |
| NEROCA | Imphal, Manipur |
| Rajasthan United | Jaipur, Rajasthan |
| Real Kashmir | Srinagar, Jammu and Kashmir |
| RoundGlass Punjab | Ludhiana, Punjab |
| Sreenidi Deccan | Vishakapatnam, Andhra Pradesh |
| Sudeva Delhi | New Delhi, Delhi |
| TRAU | Imphal, Manipur |

== Personnel and sponsorship ==
| Team | Head coach | Captain | Kit manufacturer | Shirt sponsor |
|---|---|---|---|---|
| Aizawl | (India) Yan Law | (India) Malsawmtluanga | (Philippines) Vamos | NECS Limited |
| Churchill Brothers | (Spain) Antonio Jesús Rueda Fernández | (India) Richard Costa | (India) Nivia Sports | Churchill |
| Gokulam Kerala | (Italy) Vincenzo Alberto Annese | (Afghanistan) Sharif Mukhammad | (India) SEGA | CSB Bank |
| Indian Arrows | (India) Shanmugam Venkatesh | (India) Lalchhanhima Sailo | (India) SIX5SIX | Hero MotoCorp |
| Kenkre | (India) Akhil Kothari | (India) Azhar Delhiwala | (Denmark) Hummel | |
| Mohammedan | (Russia) Andrey Chernyshov | (Serbia) Nikola Stojanović | (Denmark) Hummel | BunkerHill Sports |
| NEROCA | (India) Khogen Singh | (India) Shubham Dhas | (India) Nivia Sports | Vintel Infracom Pvt. Ltd. |
| Rajasthan United | (Spain) Francesc Bonet | (India) Abhishek Ambekar | (India) Ambition Sportswear | Jagran Lakecity University |
| Real Kashmir | (Scotland) David Robertson | (Scotland) Mason Robertson | (India) SIX5SIX | Hotel CH2 |
| RoundGlass Punjab | (Netherlands) Ed Engelkes | (India) Gurtej Singh | (India) SIX5SIX | RoundGlass Sports |
| Sreenidi Deccan | (Spain) Fernando Santiago Varela | (India) Dinesh Singh Soraisham | (India) Nivia | Sreenidhi Group |
| Sudeva Delhi | (India) Mehrajuddin Wadoo (caretaker) | (India) Sairuat Kima | (Denmark) Hummel | Liquid Life |
| TRAU | (India) Nandakumar Singh | (Brazil) Helder Lobato Ribeiro | (India) Ambition Sportswear | HVS |

=== Managerial changes ===
| Team | Outgoing manager | Manner of departure | Date of vacancy | Ref. | Round | Table | Incoming manager | Date of appointment | Ref. |
|---|---|---|---|---|---|---|---|---|---|
| Sreenidi Deccan | Expansion team | | | | Pre-season | | (Spain) Fernando Santiago Varela | 20 April 2021 | |
| Mohammedan | (India) Sankarlal Chakraborty | End of caretaker spell | 10 May 2021 | | Pre-season | | (Russia) Andrey Chernyshov | 12 May 2021 | |
| Churchill Brothers | (Spain) Fernando Santiago Varela | End of contract | 20 April 2021 | | Pre-season | | (Romania) Petre Gigiu | 18 June 2021 | |
| NEROCA | (India) Gift Raikhan | End of contract | 30 June 2021 | | Pre-season | | (India) Khogen Singh | 3 July 2021 | |
| RoundGlass Punjab | (Republic of Ireland) Curtis Fleming | Signed by Bristol City | 1 June 2021 | | Pre-season | | (England) Ashley Westwood | 15 July 2021 | |
| Sudeva Delhi | (Bhutan) Chencho Dorji | Professional improvement | 13 November 2021 | | Pre-season | | (India) Mehrajuddin Wadoo (caretaker) | 13 November 2021 | |
| Rajasthan United | (India) Vikrant Sharma | Technical director | 2 December 2021 | | Pre-season | | (Spain) Francesc Bonet | 2 December 2021 | |
| Churchill Brothers | (Romania) Petre Gigiu | End of contract | 12 January 2022 | | COVID-19 break | | (Spain) Antonio Jesús Rueda Fernández | 12 February 2022 | |
| RoundGlass Punjab | (England) Ashley Westwood | Mutual Agreement | 23 March 2022 | | 6 | 3rd | (Netherlands) Ed Engelkes | 23 March 2022 | |

== Foreign players ==
AIFF allowed maximum of six foreign players including one from AFC-affiliated country per team but only four can be part of matchday squad. Indian Arrows cannot sign any foreign player as they are part of AIFF's developmental program.

| Team | Player 1 | Player 2 | Player 3 | Player 4 | Player 5 | AFC player | Former player(s) |
|---|---|---|---|---|---|---|---|
| Aizawl | (Cameroon) Aser Pierrick Dipanda | (Trinidad and Tobago) Willis Plaza | (Trinidad and Tobago) Robert Primus | | | (Tajikistan) Bakhtior Kalandarov | (Ivory Coast) Bazie Armand (Uzbekistan) Olimjon Karimov |
| Churchill Brothers | (Brazil) Guilherme Escuro | (Guinea) Sekou Sylla | (Nigeria) Kenneth Ikechukwu | (Senegal) Momo Cisse | (Ivory Coast) Gnohere Krizo | (Tajikistan) Komron Tursunov | (Lebanon) Shadi Skaf |
| Gokulam Kerala | (Cameroon) Aminou Bouba | (Jamaica) Jourdaine Fletcher | (Slovenia) Luka Majcen | (Sierra Leone) David Simbo | (Sri Lanka) Ahmed Waseem Razeek | (Afghanistan) Sharif Mukhammad | (Ghana) Rahim Osumanu |
| Kenkre | (Cameroon) Zacharie Mbenda | (Tibet) Tenzin Samdup | | | | | |
| Mohammedan | (Uganda) Henry Kisekka | (Montenegro) Andjelo Rudović | (Serbia) Nikola Stojanović | (Trinidad and Tobago) Marcus Joseph | | (Syria) Shaher Shaheen | (Bosnia and Herzegovina) Ismar Tandir |
| NEROCA | (Ghana) Ben Quansah | (Spain) Juan Mera | (Spain) Sergio Mendigutxia | (Zimbabwe) Davis Kamanga | | (Lebanon) Mohamad Kdouh | |
| Rajasthan United | (Nigeria) Akeem Abioye | (Spain) Pedro Manzi | (Argentina) Mauro dos Santos | (Spain) Omar Ramos | | (Uzbekistan) Sardor Jakhonov | (Brazil) Marcelinho (Tajikistan) Komron Tursunov (Argentina) Diego Bielkiewicz |
| Real Kashmir | (Brazil) Tiago Adan | (Scotland) Mason Robertson | (Spain) Fran Gonzalez | (Ivory Coast) Bernard Yao Kouassi | | (South Korea) Park Jong-oh | |
| RoundGlass Punjab | (England) Josef Yarney | (England) Kurtis Guthrie | (Spain) Joseba Beitia | | | (Australia) Travis Major | |
| Sreenidi Deccan | (Colombia) Juan David Castañeda | (Ghana) Mohamed Awal | (Nigeria) Ogana Louis | | | (Lebanon) Hamza Kheir | |
| Sudeva Delhi | | | | | | | |
| TRAU | (Brazil) Helder Lobato Ribeiro | (Brazil) Douglas Santana | (Brazil) Fernandinho | (Nigeria) Joseph Olaleye | (Saint Kitts and Nevis) Gerard Williams | (Uzbekistan) Akobir Turaev | |

== Phase 1 ==
=== Standings ===
| Pos | Team | Pld | W | D | L | GF | GA | GD | Pts | Qualification |
|---|---|---|---|---|---|---|---|---|---|---|
| 1 | Gokulam Kerala | 12 | 9 | 3 | 0 | 33 | 10 | +23 | 30 | Championship stage |
| 2 | Mohammedan | 12 | 8 | 2 | 2 | 23 | 12 | +11 | 26 | Championship stage |
| 3 | RoundGlass Punjab | 12 | 7 | 2 | 3 | 25 | 17 | +8 | 23 | Championship stage |
| 4 | Sreenidi Deccan | 12 | 6 | 3 | 3 | 18 | 14 | +4 | 21 | Championship stage |
| 5 | Churchill Brothers | 12 | 6 | 2 | 4 | 16 | 15 | +1 | 20 | Championship stage |
| 6 | NEROCA | 12 | 4 | 6 | 2 | 17 | 16 | +1 | 18 | Championship stage |
| 7 | Rajasthan United | 12 | 3 | 7 | 2 | 10 | 8 | +2 | 16 | Championship stage |
| 8 | Real Kashmir | 12 | 2 | 7 | 3 | 18 | 22 | −4 | 13 | Relegation stage |
| 9 | TRAU | 12 | 3 | 3 | 6 | 12 | 15 | −3 | 12 | Relegation stage |
| 10 | Aizawl | 12 | 4 | 0 | 8 | 15 | 19 | −4 | 12 | Relegation stage |
| 11 | Sudeva Delhi | 12 | 2 | 4 | 6 | 9 | 16 | −7 | 10 | Relegation stage |
| 12 | Indian Arrows | 12 | 2 | 3 | 7 | 6 | 20 | −14 | 9 | Relegation stage |
| 13 | Kenkre | 12 | 0 | 2 | 10 | 6 | 24 | −18 | 2 | Relegation stage |

Source: Hero I-League
Rules for classification: 1) points; 2) head-to-head points; 3) head-to-head goal difference; 4) goal difference; 5) number of goals scored; 6) drawing of lots

=== Fixtures and results ===
All matches were played at neutral venues. The "home" and "away" are designated to identify Team 1 and Team 2 respectively.

| Home \ Away | GOK | MOH | RGP | SRD | CHB | NER | RAJ | REK | TRU | AIZ | SUD | ARW | KEN |
|---|---|---|---|---|---|---|---|---|---|---|---|---|---|
| Gokulam Kerala | — | — | — | — | 1–0 | — | 1–1 | 5–1 | — | — | — | 5–0 | 6–2 |
| Mohammedan | 1–1 | — | 1–3 | 3–1 | 1–2 | — | 2–1 | — | — | — | 2–1 | 4–0 | 1–0 |
| RoundGlass Punjab | 1–3 | — | — | 1–2 | 2–2 | 1–1 | — | 0–2 | 1–0 | 4–3 | 3–2 | 3–1 | — |
| Sreenidi Deccan | 1–2 | — | — | — | 1–1 | — | 0–0 | — | 3–1 | — | — | — | 2–1 |
| Churchill Brothers | — | — | — | — | — | — | — | — | — | 2–1 | 0–1 | — | — |
| NEROCA | 0–0 | 1–1 | — | 3–2 | 2–4 | — | 1–1 | — | — | 0–2 | — | 1–0 | 2–1 |
| Rajasthan United | — | — | 0–2 | — | 2–0 | — | — | 2–2 | — | 1–0 | 0–0 | 0–0 | 0–0 |
| Real Kashmir | — | 1–3 | — | 1–1 | 0–1 | 3–3 | — | — | 1–1 | 3–2 | 2–2 | 1–1 | 1–1 |
| TRAU | 2–3 | 1–2 | — | — | 2–0 | 0–2 | 0–2 | — | — | — | 0–0 | 0–0 | 3–0 |
| Aizawl | 1–2 | 0–2 | — | 0–2 | — | — | — | — | 1–2 | — | — | — | 1–0 |
| Sudeva Delhi | 0–4 | — | — | 0–1 | — | 1–1 | — | — | — | 1–2 | — | 0–1 | 1–0 |
| Indian Arrows | — | — | — | 1–2 | 1–2 | — | — | — | — | 0–2 | — | — | 1–0 |
| Kenkre | — | — | 0–4 | — | 1–2 | — | — | — | — | — | — | — | — |

Source: I-League
Legend: Blue = home team win; Yellow = draw; Red = away team win.

=== Positions by round ===
The table lists the positions of teams after each round mentioned in official fixtures.

| Round | 1 | 2 | 3 | 4 | 5 | 6 | 7 | 8 | 9 | 10 | 11 | 12 | 13 |
|---|---|---|---|---|---|---|---|---|---|---|---|---|---|
| Aizawl | 9 | 13 | 13 | 13 | 12 | 8 | 10 | 8 | 9 | 10 | 9 | 9 | 10 |
| Churchill Brothers | 12 | 9 | 10 | 11 | 11 | 12 | 9 | 9 | 7 | 6 | 5 | 6 | 5 |
| Gokulam Kerala | 5 | 5 | 3 | 2 | 2 | 2 | 2 | 2 | 2 | 2 | 1 | 1 | 1 |
| Indian Arrows | 6 | 6 | 5 | 10 | 9 | 10 | 12 | 12 | 11 | 11 | 12 | 11 | 12 |
| Kenkre | 8 | 8 | 11 | 12 | 13 | 13 | 13 | 13 | 13 | 13 | 13 | 13 | 13 |
| Mohammedan | 4 | 1 | 1 | 1 | 1 | 1 | 1 | 1 | 1 | 1 | 2 | 2 | 2 |
| NEROCA | 2 | 4 | 4 | 4 | 4 | 5 | 5 | 4 | 6 | 5 | 6 | 5 | 6 |
| Rajasthan United | 13 | 12 | 9 | 8 | 8 | 6 | 6 | 6 | 5 | 7 | 7 | 7 | 7 |
| Real Kashmir | 3 | 3 | 6 | 5 | 7 | 9 | 7 | 7 | 8 | 8 | 8 | 8 | 8 |
| RoundGlass Punjab | 1 | 2 | 2 | 3 | 3 | 3 | 4 | 5 | 4 | 4 | 3 | 3 | 3 |
| Sreenidi Deccan | 10 | 7 | 7 | 6 | 6 | 4 | 3 | 3 | 3 | 3 | 4 | 4 | 4 |
| Sudeva Delhi | 11 | 11 | 8 | 7 | 10 | 11 | 11 | 11 | 12 | 12 | 11 | 12 | 11 |
| TRAU | 7 | 10 | 12 | 9 | 5 | 7 | 8 | 10 | 10 | 9 | 10 | 10 | 9 |

| Promotion to Championship stage |
| Demotion to Relegation stage |

=== Results by games ===
| Match | 1 | 2 | 3 | 4 | 5 | 6 | 7 | 8 | 9 | 10 | 11 | 12 |
|---|---|---|---|---|---|---|---|---|---|---|---|---|
| Aizawl | L | L | L | L | W | W | L | W | L | L | W | L |
| Churchill Brothers | L | D | L | L | W | L | W | D | W | W | W | W |
| Gokulam Kerala | W | D | W | W | W | D | D | W | W | W | W | W |
| Indian Arrows | D | W | L | D | L | L | L | D | L | L | W | L |
| Kenkre | D | L | L | L | L | D | L | L | L | L | L | L |
| Mohammedan | W | W | W | W | L | W | D | W | W | L | W | D |
| NEROCA | W | D | W | D | D | D | W | L | W | L | D | D |
| Rajasthan United | L | W | D | D | W | D | D | W | L | D | D | D |
| Real Kashmir | W | D | L | D | D | W | D | D | L | D | L | D |
| RoundGlass Punjab | W | D | W | W | L | D | L | W | W | W | W | L |
| Sreenidi Deccan | L | W | L | D | W | W | W | D | W | L | W | D |
| Sudeva Delhi | L | L | W | D | L | L | D | D | L | D | L | W |
| TRAU | D | L | L | W | W | L | L | L | W | D | L | D |

W = Win; D = Draw; L = Loss

== Phase 2 ==
=== Championship stage (Group A) ===
| Pos | Team | Pld | W | D | L | GF | GA | GD | Pts | Qualification |
|---|---|---|---|---|---|---|---|---|---|---|
| 1 | Gokulam Kerala | 18 | 13 | 4 | 1 | 44 | 15 | +29 | 43 | Champions and qualification for the play–offs for 2023–24 AFC Cup group stage spot |
| 2 | Mohammedan | 18 | 11 | 4 | 3 | 34 | 18 | +16 | 37 | |
| 3 | Sreenidi Deccan | 18 | 9 | 5 | 4 | 27 | 19 | +8 | 32 | |
| 4 | Churchill Brothers | 18 | 9 | 3 | 6 | 24 | 22 | +2 | 30 | |
| 5 | RoundGlass Punjab | 18 | 8 | 4 | 6 | 33 | 29 | +4 | 28 | |
| 6 | Rajasthan United | 18 | 5 | 7 | 6 | 16 | 16 | 0 | 22 | |
| 7 | NEROCA | 18 | 4 | 8 | 6 | 21 | 30 | −9 | 20 | |

Source: Hero I-League
Rules for classification: 1) points; 2) head-to-head points; 3) head-to-head goal difference; 4) goal difference; 5) number of goals scored; 6) drawing of lots

=== Relegation stage (Group B) ===
| Pos | Team | Pld | W | D | L | GF | GA | GD | Pts |
|---|---|---|---|---|---|---|---|---|---|
| 1 | Aizawl | 17 | 7 | 0 | 10 | 23 | 26 | −3 | 21 |
| 2 | TRAU | 17 | 4 | 6 | 7 | 15 | 17 | −2 | 18 |
| 3 | Indian Arrows | 17 | 4 | 5 | 8 | 10 | 23 | −13 | 17 (Note: Head-to-head standings: Indian Arrows 4 points, Sudeva Delhi 1 point.) |
| 4 | Sudeva Delhi | 17 | 4 | 5 | 8 | 13 | 23 | −10 | 17 |
| 5 | Real Kashmir | 17 | 2 | 8 | 7 | 23 | 31 | −8 | 14 |
| 6 | Kenkre | 17 | 3 | 3 | 11 | 11 | 25 | −14 | 12 |

Source: Hero I-League
Rules for classification: 1) points; 2) head-to-head points; 3) head-to-head goal difference; 4) goal difference; 5) number of goals scored; 6) drawing of lots

==== Fixtures and results ====
All matches were played at neutral venues. The "home" and "away" are designated to identify Team 1 and Team 2 respectively.

| Home \ Away | AIZ | TRU | ARW | SUD | REK | KEN |
|---|---|---|---|---|---|---|
| Aizawl | — | — | — | 3–1 | 3–2 | 0–1 |
| TRAU | 2–0 | — | 0–0 | 0–1 | — | — |
| Indian Arrows | 1–2 | — | — | — | — | 1–0 |
| Sudeva Delhi | — | — | 0–0 | — | — | 0–3 |
| Real Kashmir | — | 1–1 | 1–2 | 1–2 | — | — |
| Kenkre | — | 0–0 | — | — | 1–0 | — |

Source: I-League
Legend: Blue = home team win; Yellow = draw; Red = away team win.

==== Positions by round ====
The table lists the positions of teams after each round mentioned in official fixtures.

| Round | 1 | 2 | 3 | 4 | 5 |
|---|---|---|---|---|---|
| Aizawl | 1 | 1 | 1 | 1 | 1 |
| Indian Arrows | 5 | 5 | 5 | 4 | 3 |
| Kenkre | 6 | 6 | 6 | 6 | 6 |
| Real Kashmir | 3 | 3 | 4 | 5 | 5 |
| Sudeva Delhi | 4 | 4 | 2 | 2 | 4 |
| TRAU | 2 | 2 | 3 | 3 | 2 |

| Relegation position |

==== Results by games ====
| Match | 1 | 2 | 3 | 4 | 5 |
|---|---|---|---|---|---|
| Aizawl | W | L | W | L | W |
| Indian Arrows | D | W | L | D | W |
| Kenkre | W | W | D | W | L |
| Real Kashmir | L | L | L | L | D |
| Sudeva Delhi | L | W | W | D | L |
| TRAU | D | L | D | W | D |

W = Win; D = Draw; L = Loss

== Final standings ==
| Pos | Team | Pld | W | D | L | GF | GA | GD | Pts |
|---|---|---|---|---|---|---|---|---|---|
| 1 | Gokulam Kerala (C) | 18 | 13 | 4 | 1 | 44 | 15 | +29 | 43 |
| 2 | Mohammedan | 18 | 11 | 4 | 3 | 34 | 18 | +16 | 37 |
| 3 | Sreenidi Deccan | 18 | 9 | 5 | 4 | 27 | 19 | +8 | 32 |
| 4 | Churchill Brothers | 18 | 9 | 3 | 6 | 24 | 22 | +2 | 30 |
| 5 | RoundGlass Punjab | 18 | 8 | 4 | 6 | 33 | 29 | +4 | 28 |
| 6 | Rajasthan United | 18 | 5 | 7 | 6 | 16 | 16 | 0 | 22 |
| 7 | NEROCA | 18 | 4 | 8 | 6 | 21 | 30 | −9 | 20 |
| 8 | Aizawl | 17 | 7 | 0 | 10 | 23 | 26 | −3 | 21 |
| 9 | TRAU | 17 | 4 | 6 | 7 | 15 | 17 | −2 | 18 |
| 10 | Indian Arrows | 17 | 4 | 5 | 8 | 10 | 23 | −13 | 17 |
| 11 | Sudeva Delhi | 17 | 4 | 5 | 8 | 13 | 23 | −10 | 17 |
| 12 | Real Kashmir | 17 | 2 | 8 | 7 | 23 | 31 | −8 | 14 |
| 13 | Kenkre | 17 | 3 | 3 | 11 | 11 | 25 | −14 | 12 |

Source: Hero I-League
Rules for classification: 1) points; 2) head-to-head points; 3) head-to-head goal difference; 4) goal difference; 5) number of goals scored; 6) drawing of lots
(C) Champions

== Season statistics ==
=== Top scorers ===
As of 15 May 2022

Note: Only top 10 goalscorers of the season has been listed below.

| Rank | Player | Club | Goals |
|---|---|---|---|
| 1 | (Trinidad and Tobago) Marcus Joseph | Mohammedan | 15 |
| 2 | (England) Kurtis Guthrie | RoundGlass Punjab | 13 |
| 2 | (Slovenia) Luka Majcen | Gokulam Kerala | 13 |
| 4 | (Spain) Sergio Mendigutxia | NEROCA | 10 |
| 4 | (Colombia) David Castañeda | Sreenidi Deccan | 10 |
| 4 | (Nigeria) Kenneth Ikechukwu | Churchill Brothers | 10 |
| 7 | (Scotland) Mason Robertson | Real Kashmir | 9 |
| 7 | (Jamaica) Jourdaine Fletcher | Gokulam Kerala | 9 |
| 9 | (Brazil) Tiago Adan | Real Kashmir | 7 |
| 10 | (Nigeria) Ogana Louis | Sreenidi Deccan | 6 |
| 10 | (Tajikistan) Komron Tursunov | Churchill Brothers | 6 |

=== Top assists ===
As of 14 May 2022

Note: Only top 3 assist providers have been listed below.

| Rank | Player | Club | Assists |
|---|---|---|---|
| 1 | (Serbia) Nikola Stojanović | Mohammedan | 9 |
| 2 | (Slovenia) Luka Majcen | Gokulam Kerala | 7 |
| 3 | (Australia) Travis Major | RoundGlass Punjab | 5 |
| 3 | (Spain) Juan Mera | NEROCA | 5 |
| 3 | (India) Lalchungnunga | Sreenidi Deccan | 5 |

=== Hat-tricks ===
Note: The score of the player's team is displayed first in the result column.

| Player | For | Against | Result | Date |
|---|---|---|---|---|
| (Spain) Sergio Mendigutxia | NEROCA | Sreenidi Deccan | 3–2 | 27 December 2021 |
| (Slovenia) Luka Majcen | Gokulam Kerala | Kenkre | 6–2 | 12 March 2022 |
| (Slovenia) Luka Majcen | Gokulam Kerala | Sudeva Delhi | 4–0 | 15 April 2022 |
| (India) Lalromawia | Sreenidi Deccan | Gokulam Kerala | 3–1 | 10 May 2022 |

=== Clean sheets ===
As of 14 May 2022

Note: Only top 5 goalkeepers with most cleansheets have been listed below.

| Rank | Player | Club | Clean sheets |
|---|---|---|---|
| 1 | (India) Bhaskar Roy | Rajasthan United | 8 |
| 2 | (India) Rakshit Dagar | Gokulam Kerala | 7 |
| 3 | (India) Zothanmawia | Mohammedan | 6 |
| 4 | (India) Sachin Jha | Sudeva Delhi | 5 |
| 5 | (India) Aryan Niraj Lamba | Sreenidi Deccan | 4 |
| 5 | (India) Loitongbam Bishorjit Singh | TRAU | 4 |

=== Discipline ===
==== Player ====
- Most yellow cards: 7
  - (Argentina) Mauro dos Santos (Rajasthan United)
- Most red cards: 2
  - (Trinidad and Tobago) Robert Primus (Aizawl)

==== Club ====
- Most yellow cards: 35
  - Churchill Brothers
- Most red cards: 5
  - Real Kashmir

== Awards ==
- Match 1 - 78 = First phase
- Match 79 - 114 = Second phase

=== Hero of the Match ===
| Match No. | Hero of the Match | | Match No. | Hero of the Match | | Match No. | Hero of the Match | |
| Match No. | Player | Club | Match No. | Player | Club | Match No. | Player | Club |
|---|---|---|---|---|---|---|---|---|
| Match 1 | (India) Ahan Prakash | Indian Arrows | Match 2 | (Afghanistan) Sharif Mukhammad | Gokulam Kerala | Match 3 | (India) Shreyansh Choudhary | Rajasthan United |
| Match 4 | (Spain) Sergio Mendigutxia | NEROCA | Match 5 | (Brazil) Tiago Adan | Real Kashmir | Match 6 | (Trinidad and Tobago) Marcus Joseph | Mohammedan |
| Match 7 | (Colombia) David Castañeda | Sreenidi Deccan | Match 8 | (Spain) Juan Mera | NEROCA | Match 9 | (Trinidad and Tobago) Marcus Joseph | Mohammedan |
| Match 10 | (India) Parthib Gogoi | Indian Arrows | Match 11 | (Scotland) Mason Robertson | Real Kashmir | Match 12 | (Nigeria) Kenneth Ikechukwu | Churchill Brothers |
| Match 13 | (Trinidad and Tobago) Marcus Joseph | Mohammedan | Match 14 | (Jamaica) Jourdaine Fletcher | Gokulam Kerala | Match 15 | (India) Md Abdul Salam | NEROCA |
| Match 16 | (India) Aman Thapa | Rajasthan United | Match 17 | (England) Kurtis Guthrie | RoundGlass Punjab | Match 18 | (India) William Pauliankhum | Sudeva Delhi |
| Match 19 | (India) Souvik Das | Sudeva Delhi | Match 20 | (India) Ramhlunchhunga | Aizawl | Match 21 | (India) Phalguni Singh | Sreenidi Deccan |
| Match 22 | (Brazil) Douglas Santana | TRAU | Match 23 | (Slovenia) Luka Majcen | Gokulam Kerala | Match 24 | (Trinidad and Tobago) Marcus Joseph | Mohammedan |
| Match 25 | (India) Lalliansanga | Aizawl | Match 26 | (Nigeria) Ogana Louis | Sreenidi Deccan | Match 27 | (Spain) Sergio Mendigutxia | NEROCA |
| Match 28 | (India) Vibin Mohanan | Indian Arrows | Match 29 | (Nigeria) Kenneth Ikechukwu | Churchill Brothers | Match 30 | (India) Krishananda Singh | TRAU |
| Match 31 | (Cameroon) Aser Dipanda | Aizawl | Match 32 | (Colombia) David Castañeda | Sreenidi Deccan | Match 33 | (India) Jiteshwor Singh | NEROCA |
| Match 34 | (India) Gyamar Nikum | Rajasthan United | Match 35 | (Slovenia) Luka Majcen | Gokulam Kerala | Match 36 | (Trinidad and Tobago) Marcus Joseph | Mohammedan |
| Match 37 | (Colombia) David Castañeda | Sreenidi Deccan | Match 38 | (India) Nishchal Chandan | Sudeva Delhi | Match 39 | (Tajikistan) Komron Tursunov | Churchill Brothers |
| Match 40 | (Tibet) Tenzin Samdup | Kenkre | Match 41 | (Scotland) Mason Robertson | Real Kashmir | Match 42 | (India) Jithin MS | Gokulam Kerala |
| Match 43 | (India) Prateek Kumar Singh | NEROCA | Match 44 | (India) Ramhlunchhunga | Aizawl | Match 45 | (India) Phalguni Singh | Sreenidi Deccan |
| Match 46 | (Brazil) Tiago Adan | Real Kashmir | Match 47 | (Slovenia) Luka Majcen | Gokulam Kerala | Match 48 | (India) Faisal Ali | Mohammedan |
| Match 49 | (India) Phalguni Singh | Sreenidi Deccan | Match 50 | (Jamaica) Jourdaine Fletcher | Gokulam Kerala | Match 51 | (India) Saurav Mandal | Churchill Brothers |
| Match 52 | (India) Raj Basfore | Indian Arrows | Match 53 | (India) Sumeet Passi | RoundGlass Punjab | Match 54 | (India) Ricky Shabong | Rajasthan United |
| Match 55 | (India) Peter Haokip | NEROCA | Match 56 | (Cameroon) Aminou Bouba | Gokulam Kerala | Match 57 | (India) Khanngam Horam | TRAU |
| Match 58 | (England) Kurtis Guthrie | RoundGlass Punjab | Match 59 | (Serbia) Nikola Stojanović | Mohammedan | Match 60 | (India) Kingslee Fernandes | Churchill Brothers |
| Match 61 | (India) Md Fayazuddin Shah | TRAU | Match 62 | (Slovenia) Luka Majcen | Gokulam Kerala | Match 63 | (India) Lalremsanga Fanai | Aizawl |
| Match 64 | (India) Kingslee Fernandes | Churchill Brothers | Match 65 | (Scotland) Mason Robertson | Real Kashmir | Match 66 | (England) Kurtis Guthrie | RoundGlass Punjab |
| Match 67 | (Colombia) David Castañeda | Sreenidi Deccan | Match 68 | (Spain) Omar Ramos | Rajasthan United | Match 69 | (India) SK Faiaz | Mohammedan |
| Match 70 | (India) Brijesh Giri | Indian Arrows | Match 71 | (Slovenia) Luka Majcen | Gokulam Kerala | Match 72 | (India) Freddy Lallawmawma | RoundGlass Punjab |
| Match 73 | (India) Ricky Shabong | Rajasthan United | Match 74 | (India) Jiteshwor Singh | NEROCA | Match 75 | (Tajikistan) Komron Tursunov | Churchill Brothers |
| Match 76 | (India) William Pauliankhum | Sudeva Delhi | Match 77 | (Cameroon) Aminou Bouba | Gokulam Kerala | Match 78 | (Scotland) Mason Robertson | Real Kashmir |
| Match 79 | (India) Samuel Lalmuanpuia | Aizawl | Match 80 | (India) Aniket Panchal | Kenkre | Match 81 | (India) Kishan Singh | TRAU |
| Match 82 | (India) Gurmukh Singh | Rajasthan United | Match 83 | (India) Alex Saji | Gokulam Kerala | Match 84 | (India) Faisal Ali | Mohammedan |
| Match 85 | (India) Parthib Gogoi | Indian Arrows | Match 86 | (India) Shubho Paul | Sudeva Delhi | Match 87 | (India) Ranjeet Pandre | Kenkre |
| Match 88 | (Spain) Omar Ramos | Rajasthan United | Match 89 | (India) Jiteshwor Singh | NEROCA | Match 90 | (Trinidad and Tobago) Marcus Joseph | Mohammedan |
| Match 91 | (India) Lalremsanga Fanai | Aizawl | Match 92 | (India) Loitongbam Bishorjit Singh | TRAU | Match 93 | (India) Vanlalzuidika Chhakchhuak | Sudeva Delhi |
| Match 94 | (India) Aakash Sangwan | RoundGlass Punjab | Match 95 | (Afghanistan) Sharif Mukhammad | Gokulam Kerala | Match 96 | (India) Manoj Mohammed | Mohammedan |
| Match 97 | (India) Vibin Mohanan | Indian Arrows | Match 98 | (India) Aravindraj Rajan | Kenkre | Match 99 | (India) Laishram Milan Singh | TRAU |
| Match 100 | (Spain) Omar Ramos | Rajasthan United | Match 101 | (Ivory Coast) Gnoheré Krizo | Churchill Brothers | Match 102 | (India) Thahir Zaman | Gokulam Kerala |
| Match 103 | (India) Himanshu Jangra | Indian Arrows | Match 104 | (India) Bilal Khan | Real Kashmir | Match 105 | (India) Samuel Lalmuanpuia | Aizawl |
| Match 106 | (Trinidad and Tobago) Marcus Joseph | Mohammedan | Match 107 | (Nigeria) Ogana Louis | Sreenidi Deccan | Match 108 | (India) Rishad PP | Gokulam Kerala |
| Match 109 | (India) Kingslee Fernandes | Churchill Brothers | Match 110 | (India) Brandon Vanlalremdika | Mohammedan | Match 111 | (India) Lalromawia | Sreenidi Deccan |
| Match 112 | (Spain) Juan Mera | NEROCA | Match 113 | (India) Lalromawia | Sreenidi Deccan | Match 114 | (Cameroon) Aminou Bouba | Gokulam Kerala |
Source: The AIFF

== Season awards ==
| Award | Winner |
|---|---|
| Hero of the League | (Trinidad and Tobago) Marcus Joseph (Mohammedan) |
| Golden Boot | (Trinidad and Tobago) Marcus Joseph (Mohammedan) |
| Golden Glove | (India) Bhaskar Roy (Rajasthan United) |
| Jarnail Singh Award (Best Defender) | (Cameroon) Aminou Bouba (Gokulam Kerala) |
| Best Midfielder | (India) Jithin MS (Gokulam Kerala) |
| Syed Abdul Rahim Award (Best Coach) | (Italy) Vincenzo Alberto Annese (Gokulam Kerala) |
| Emerging Player of the League | (India) Jiteshwor Singh (NEROCA) |
| Fair Play Award | Indian Arrows |

== I-League All Stars ==
A combined all Indian squad of this season's I-League was prepared to play to a friendly against India national football team.

- Goalkeepers: Bhaskar Roy, Shubham Dhas.
- Defenders: Manoj Mohammad, Mohammed Salah, Chungnunga Lal, Lalramchullova, Suresh Meitei, Asheer Akhtar, Gurmukh Singh, Tanmoy Ghosh.
- Midfielders: Faisal Ali, Sweden Fernandes, William Pauliankhum, Freddy Lallawmawma, Konsam Phalguni Singh, Maheson Singh, Jijo Joseph, Kabir Nath, Jiteshwor Singh.
- Forwards: Ranjeet Singh Pandre, Parthib Sundar Gogoi.

17 May 2022
Exhibition friendly

| India | 2–0 | (India) I-League All Stars |
|---|---|---|
| Chhetri; Pandita | Report |

Kishore Bharati Krirangan, Kolkata, India

== See also ==
- 2021–22 Indian Super League season
- 2021–22 in Indian football
- 2021 Durand Cup
- 2021 IFA Shield
