= 2023–24 Sreenidi Deccan FC season =

2023–24 season of Sreenidi Deccan FC

Sreenidi Deccan
2023–24 season
- Owner: Sreenidhi Group
- Head coach: Carlos Vaz Pinto
- Stadium: Deccan Arena
- I-League: 2nd
- Super Cup: Group stage
- Top goalscorer: League: William Alves; David Castañeda (8 goals each); All: William Alves (10)
- Highest home attendance: 900 (v. Aizawl, 7 November 2023)
- Lowest home attendance: 80 (v. Namdhari, 25 February 2024)
Home colours	Away colours	Third colours

The 2023–24 season is Sreenidi Deccan Football Club's third season. They participated in the I-League.

== Technical staff ==
As of 3 August 2022

Role	Name
Head coach	(Portugal) Carlos Vaz Pinto
Assistant coach	(India) Birendra Thapa
Conditioning coach	(Mexico) Jorge Ovando Toledo
Goalkeeping coach	TBA
Performance Analyst	(India) Saiguhan E.

== First-team squad ==
As of 31 January 2024

Note: Flags indicate national team as defined under FIFA eligibility rules; some limited exceptions apply. Players may hold more than one non-FIFA nationality.

No.	Pos.	Nation	Player
1	GK	IND	Ubaid CK
2	DF	IND	Shahabaaz Khan
3	MF	CIV	Ibrahim Sissoko
5	DF	IND	Pawan Kumar
6	MF	IND	Lalnuntluanga Bawitlung
7	FW	BRA	William Alves
8	MF	IND	Kean Lewis
10	MF	AFG	Faysal Shayesteh
11	FW	COL	David Castañeda (captain)
12	DF	IND	Mohammad Sajid Dhot
13	MF	IND	Mayakkannan
14	MF	IND	Arun Kumar
15	DF	IND	Asraf Ali Mondal
17	FW	IND	Rosenberg Gabriel
19	FW	IND	Songpu Singsit
21	FW	IND	Lalromawia

No.	Pos.	Nation	Player
22	DF	BRA	Eli Sabiá
23	GK	IND	Jaspreet Singh
24	DF	IND	Arijit Bagui
25	DF	IND	Subhankar Adhikari
26	DF	IND	Sunil Bathala
27	DF	IND	Abhishek Ambekar
29	MF	IND	Brandon Vanlalremdika
32	GK	IND	Albino Gomes
33	DF	IND	Jagdeep Singh
41	GK	IND	Aryan Niraj Lamba
42	MF	IND	R Lawmnasangzuala
48	MF	IND	Lalbiakliana
50	FW	IND	Emboklang Nongkhlaw
55	DF	IND	Gurmukh Singh
77	MF	NGA	Rilwan Hassan

== Transfers and loans ==
=== New contracts ===
Date	Position	NO	Player	Ref.
17 May 2023	FW	11	(Colombia) David Castañeda	
30 May 2023	FW	17	(India) Rosenberg Gabriel	
05 June 2023	MF	10	(Afghanistan) Faysal Shayesteh	
12 June 2023	GK	01	(India) Ubaid CK	
28 June 2023	FW	21	(India) Lalromawia	
08 July 2023	DF	02	(India) Shahabaaz Khan	
28 July 2023	GK	41	(India) Aryan Niraj Lamba	
05 August 2023	GK	23	(India) Jaspreet Singh	

=== Transfers in ===
Entry date	Position	Player	Previous club	Fee	Ref.
19 June 2023	DF	Subhankar Adhikari	(India) Gokulam Kerala	None	
26 June 2023	DF	Abhishek Ambekar	(India) Mohammedan	None	
01 July 2023	MF	Kean Lewis	(India) Mohammedan	None	
30 July 2023	MF	Lalnuntluanga Bawitlung	(India) Real Kashmir	None	
01 August 2023	FW	Emboklang Nongkhlaw	(India) Reserves	None	
01 August 2023	DF	Aditya Tomar	(India) Reserves	None	
01 August 2023		Tikam Reddy	(India) Reserves	None	
01 August 2023		Khamchin Khup	(India) Reserves	None	
03 August 2023	DF	Pawan Kumar	(India) Gokulam Kerala	None	
04 August 2023	MF	Lalbiakliana	(India) Sudeva Delhi	None	
08 August 2023	FW	(Brazil) William Alves	(Brazil) Ferroviário	None	
13 August 2023	GK	Albino Gomes	(India) Churchill Brothers	None	
14 August 2023	DF	Gurmukh Singh	(India) Chennaiyin	None	
14 August 2023	DF	Jagdeep Singh	(India) Rajasthan United	None	
16 August 2023	DF	(Brazil) Eli Sabiá	(India) Jamshedpur	None	
18 August 2023	DF	Mohammad Sajid Dhot	(India) Chennaiyin	None	
23 August 2023	MF	(Ivory Coast) Ibrahim Sissoko	Free Agent	None	
26 September 2023	MF	R Lawmnasangzuala	(India) Sudeva Delhi	None	
31 January 2024	DF	Arijit Bagui	(India) Bhawanipore	None	
31 January 2024	DF	Brandon Vanlalremdika	(India) Punjab	None	

=== Transfers out ===
Exit date	Position	Player	To club	Fee	Ref.
08 June 2023	DF	Arijit Bagui	Bhawanipore	Free Transfer	
02 July 2023	DF	Bijay Chhetri	Chennaiyin	Free Transfer	
03 July 2023	MF	Phalguni Singh	NorthEast United	Free Transfer	
22 July 2023	DF	Dinesh Singh	NorthEast United	Free Transfer	
02 August 2023	DF	Asheer Akhtar	NorthEast United	Undisclosed Fee	
18 August 2023	MF	Suraj Rawat	Bengaluru United	Free Transfer	
05 September 2023	DF	(Ghana) Mohamed Awal	TBA	Free Agent	
05 September 2023	MF	(Republic of the Congo) Dua Stanislas Ankira	TBA	Free Agent	
05 September 2023	FW	(Nigeria) Ogana Louis	TBA	Free Agent	
05 September 2023	GK	Harsh Patil	TBA	Free Agent	
05 September 2023	FW	Vanlalbiaa Chhangte	TBA	Free Agent	
05 September 2023	MF	Sriram Boopathi	TBA	Free Agent	
05 September 2023	MF	Umashankar Marimuthu	TBA	Free Agent	
05 September 2023	FW	Vineeth Velmurugan	TBA	Free Agent	
05 September 2023	MF	Mayosing Khongreiwoshi	TBA	Free Agent	
25 January 2024	DF	Mohammad Abdul salam	TBA	Free Agent	

=== Loans out ===
Exit date	Position	Player	To club	Fee	Ref.

== Pre-season ==
29 August 2023 Friendly	Sreenidi Deccan	2–1	Jamshedpur	Hyderabad
15:30 IST	Lewis 40'; Sissoko 65'	Report	Khan 13'	Stadium: Deccan Arena

16 September 2023 Friendly	Sreenidi Deccan	0–0	Hyderabad	Hyderabad
15:30 IST				Stadium: Deccan Arena

22 September 2023 Friendly	Sreenidi Deccan	0–0	Hyderabad	Hyderabad
15:30 IST				Stadium: Deccan Arena

== Competitions ==
=== I-League ===
==== League table ====
Pos	Team	Pld	W	D	L	GF	GA	GD	Pts	Qualification
1	Mohammedan (C, P)	24	15	7	2	44	22	+22	52	Promotion to Indian Super League
2	Sreenidi Deccan	24	14	6	4	54	26	+28	48	
3	Gokulam Kerala	24	12	6	6	55	34	+21	42	
4	Inter Kashi	24	11	8	5	47	41	+6	41	
5	Real Kashmir	24	11	7	6	36	19	+17	40	

Source: I-League
Rules for classification: 1) Points; 2) Head-to-head points; 3) Head-to-head goal difference; 4) Total goal difference; 5) Total number of goals scored; 6) drawing of lots
(Note: Head-to-head record is used only after all the matches between the teams in question have been played).
(C) Champions; (P) Promoted

==== Matches ====
Note: I-League announced the fixtures for the 2023–24 season on 6 October 2023.

29 October 2023 1	Sreenidi Deccan	4–0	NEROCA	Hyderabad
16:30 IST	Castañeda 22', 84' (pen.); Lalromawia 57'; Lalbiakliana 90+5'	Report		Stadium: Deccan Arena; Attendance: 750; Referee: Akashkumar Mehta; Man of the Match: David Castañeda (Sreenidi Deccan)

3 November 2023 2	Sreenidi Deccan	4–1	Inter Kashi	Hyderabad
16:30 IST	Gabriel 38'; Kumar 56'; Bawitlung 77'; Lalbiakliana 85'	Report	Barco 90+3'	Stadium: Deccan Arena; Attendance: 696; Referee: K. Ramdasan; Man of the Match: Rosenberg Gabriel (Sreenidi Deccan)

7 November 2023 3	Sreenidi Deccan	1–2	Aizawl	Hyderabad
16:30 IST	Kumar 90+8'	Report	Ramdinthara 26'; Rohmingthanga 90+1'	Stadium: Deccan Arena; Attendance: 900; Referee: Mrutyunjay L. Amatya; Man of the Match: R. Ramdinthara (Aizawl)

14 November 2023 4	Shillong Lajong	2–2	Sreenidi Deccan	Shillong
14:00 IST	Ronnie Kharbudon 28'; Takuto Miki 34'	Report	Gabriel 7', 63'	Stadium: SSA Stadium; Attendance: 5,248; Referee: Jehrul Islam; Man of the Match: Rosenberg Gabriel (Sreenidi Deccan)

19 November 2023 5	TRAU	0–5	Sreenidi Deccan	Kolkata
16:30 IST		Report	G. Singh 42'; Jag. Singh 48', 58'; Lalromawia 66'; Castañeda 90+3'	Stadium: Kalyani Stadium; Attendance: 315; Referee: K. Lyngdoh Nongum; Man of the Match: Jagdeep Singh (Sreenidi Deccan)

23 November 2023 6	Rajasthan United	1–2	Sreenidi Deccan	Hyderabad
19:00 IST	Denzell 4'	Report	Alves 45+2'; Oliveira 45+5' (o.g.)	Stadium: Deccan Arena; Attendance: 88; Referee: Jatinder Singh; Man of the Match: Eli Sabiá (Sreenidi Deccan)

26 November 2023 7	Namdhari	0–2	Sreenidi Deccan	Bhaini Sahib
14:00 IST		Report	Castañeda 21'; Jag. Singh 24'	Stadium: Namdhari Stadium; Attendance: 898; Referee: Lakshay; Man of the Match: Jagdeep Singh (Sreenidi Deccan)

3 December 2023 8	Mohammedan	2–1	Sreenidi Deccan	Naihati
19:00 IST	Kasimov 37'; Hernández 60'	Report	Alves 84' (pen.)	Stadium: Naihati Stadium; Attendance: 5,825; Referee: Joyshing Monsang Thumli; Man of the Match: Eddie Hernández (Mohammedan)

7 December 2023 9	Real Kashmir	0–0	Sreenidi Deccan	Srinagar
14:00 IST		Report		Stadium: TRC Turf Ground; Attendance: 2,500; Referee: Mithun Kumar Kundu; Man of the Match: R. Lalbiakliana (Sreenidi Deccan)

11 December 2023 10	Sreenidi Deccan	1–0	Delhi	Hyderabad
19:30 IST	Gagandeep 64' (o.g.)	Report		Stadium: Deccan Arena; Attendance: 650; Referee: K. Lyngdoh Nongum; Man of the Match: Eli Sabiá (Sreenidi Deccan)

19 December 2023 11	Sreenidi Deccan	1–4	Gokulam Kerala	Hyderabad
15:00 IST	Alves 75' (pen.)	Report	Perdomo 9'; Sánchez 39', 52'; Sreekuttan 45+1'	Stadium: Deccan Arena; Attendance: 750; Referee: Mrutyunjay L. Amatya; Man of the Match: Álex Sánchez (Gokulam Kerala)

4 February 2024 12	Churchill Brothers	1–2	Sreenidi Deccan	Vasco
19:00 IST	Abdou Karim Samb 88'	Report	Castañeda 11'; Sabiá 90+4'	Stadium: Tilak Maidan; Attendance: 500; Referee: Williams Joy Koshy; Man of the Match: Eli Sabiá (Sreenidi Deccan)

14 February 2024 14	Sreenidi Deccan	3–0	TRAU	Hyderabad
16:30 IST	Hassan 35'; Castañeda 44'; Vanlalremdika 90+3'	Report		Stadium: Deccan Arena; Attendance: 123; Referee: Suresh Devraj; Man of the Match: David Castañeda (Sreenidi Deccan)

19 February 2024 15	Aizawl	1–5	Sreenidi Deccan	Aizawl
19:00 IST	Zoherliana 49'	Report	Castañeda 28'; Sabiá 66'; Sissoko 83', 90+6'; Vanlalremdika 90'	Stadium: Rajiv Gandhi Stadium; Attendance: 1,000; Referee: Joyshing Monsang Thumily; Man of the Match: David Castañeda (Sreenidi Deccan)

25 February 2024 16	Sreenidi Deccan	2–0	Namdhari	Hyderabad
16:30 IST	Hassan 18', 57'	Report		Stadium: Deccan Arena; Attendance: 80; Referee: Mrutyunjay L. Amatya; Man of the Match: Rilwan Hassan (Sreenidi Deccan)

29 February 2024 17	Sreenidi Deccan	1–1	Mohammedan	Hyderabad
16:30 IST	Castañeda 4'	Report	Jassim 84'	Stadium: Deccan Arena; Attendance: 200; Referee: K. Ramdasan; Man of the Match: David Castañeda (Sreenidi Deccan)

4 March 2024 18	Sreenidi Deccan	2–3	Real Kashmir	Hyderabad
16:30 IST	Hassan 58'; Sabiá 61'	Report	Krizo 45+4', 90+2' (pen.); Mir 87'	Stadium: Deccan Arena; Attendance: 168; Referee: Rahul Kumar Gupta; Man of the Match: Gnohere Krizo (Real Kashmir)

10 March 2024 19	Delhi	0–1	Sreenidi Deccan	Bhaini Ala
14:00 IST		Report	Lalromawia 23'	Stadium: Namdhari Stadium; Attendance: 250; Referee: K. Lyngdoh Nongum; Man of the Match: Lalromawia (Sreenidi Deccan)

17 March 2024 20	Gokulam Kerala	1–2	Sreenidi Deccan	Kozhikode
19:00 IST	Stojanović 44'	Report	Alves 48', 72' (pen.)	Stadium: EMS Stadium; Attendance: 1,024; Referee: Tejas Nagvenkar; Man of the Match: William Alves (Sreenidi Deccan)

24 March 2024 21	Sreenidi Deccan	2–2	Churchill Brothers	Hyderabad
19:00 IST	Alves 4'; Lalromawia 39'	Report	Fernandes 83'; Semkholun 89'	Stadium: Deccan Arena; Attendance: 250; Referee: Aditya Purkayastha; Man of the Match: Stendly Fernandes (Churchill Brothers)

31 March 2024 22	Sreenidi Deccan	6–1	Rajasthan United	Hyderabad
16:30 IST	Alves 8', 42'; Lalromawia 15', 90+2'; Hassan 61'; Bawitlung 86'	Report	Naoba Meitei 74'	Stadium: Deccan Arena; Attendance: 149; Referee: I. Jamal Mohamed; Man of the Match: Lalromawia (Sreenidi Deccan)

4 April 2024 13	NEROCA	1–1	Sreenidi Deccan	Shillong
16:30 IST	Meitei 70' (pen.)	Report	Castañeda 82' (pen.)	Stadium: SSA Stadium; Attendance: 200; Referee: Surojit Das; Man of the Match: Khoirom Jackson Singh (NEROCA)

8 April 2024 23	Inter Kashi	1–1	Sreenidi Deccan	Kalyani
19:00 IST	Pérez 87' (pen.)	Report	Castañeda 41'	Stadium: Kalyani Stadium; Attendance: 455; Referee: Dipu Roy; Man of the Match: Julen Pérez (Inter Kashi)

13 April 2024 24	Sreenidi Deccan	3–2	Shillong Lajong	Hyderabad
16:30 IST	Alves 4'; Gabriel 16'; Castañeda 84' (pen.)	Report	Buam 46', 87'	Stadium: Deccan Arena; Attendance: 190; Referee: Williams Joy Koshy; Man of the Match: Mayakkannan (Sreenidi Deccan)

=== Super Cup ===
==== Group A ====
Pos	Team	Pld	W	D	L	GF	GA	GD	Pts	Qualification	EAB	MBG	SRD	HYD
1	East Bengal	3	3	0	0	8	4	+4	9	Advance to knockout stage	—	3–1	2–1	3–2
2	Mohun Bagan	3	2	0	1	5	5	0	6		—	—	2–1	2–1
3	Sreenidi Deccan	3	1	0	2	6	5	+1	3		—	—	—	4–1
4	Hyderabad	3	0	0	3	4	9	−5	0		—	—	—	—

Source: AIFF
Rules for classification: 1) points; 2) head-to-head points; 3) head-to-head goal difference; 4) goal difference; 5) number of goals scored; 6) drawing of lots

==== Matches ====
9 January 2024 1	Mohun Bagan SG	2–1	Sreenidi Deccan	Bhubaneswar
19:30 IST	Cummings 40'; Sadiku 72'	Report	Alves 30' (pen.)	Stadium: Kalinga Stadium; Attendance: 200

14 January 2024 2	East Bengal	2–1	Sreenidi Deccan	Bhubaneshwar
19:30 IST	Maher 12'; Siverio 32'	Report	Alves 90+1' (pen.)	Stadium: Kalinga Stadium (Pitch 1); Man of the Match: Hijazi Maher (East Bengal)

19 January 2024 3	Hyderabad	1–4	Sreenidi Deccan	Bhubaneshwar
14:00 IST	Chothe 83'	Report	Sissoko 5'; Sabiá 7'; Lalromawia 10'; Lewis 36'	Stadium: Kalinga Stadium Pitch 1

== Statistics ==
=== Goal Scorers ===
As of 04 April 2024

Rank	No.	Pos.	Nat.	Name	I League	IFA Shield	Super Cup	Total
1	7	FW	(Brazil)	William Alves	8	0	2	10
2	11	FW	(Colombia)	David Castañeda	8	0	0	8
2	21	FW	(India)	Lalromawia	6	0	1	7
4	77	MF	(Nigeria)	Rilwan Hassan	5	0	0	5
5	22	DF	(Brazil)	Eli Sabiá	3	0	1	4
6	3	MF	(Ivory Coast)	Ibrahim Sissoko	2	0	1	3
6	17	FW	(India)	Rosenberg Gabriel	3	0	0	3
6	33	DF	(India)	Jagdeep Singh	3	0	0	3
9	5	DF	(India)	Pawan Kumar	2	0	0	2
9	6	MF	(India)	Lalnuntluanga Bawitlung	2	0	0	2
9	29	DF	(India)	Brandon Vanlalremdika	2	0	0	2
9	33	DF	(India)	Jagdeep Singh	2	0	0	2
9	48	MF	(India)	Lalbiakliana	2	0	0	2
14	8	MF	(India)	Kean Lewis	0	0	1	1
14	55	MF	(India)	Gurmukh Singh	1	0	0	1
Own Goals					2	0	0	2
