= 2022–23 Sreenidi Deccan FC season =

2022–23 season of Sreenidi Deccan FC

Sreenidi Deccan
2022–23 season
- Owner: Sreenidhi Group
Home colours

The 2022–23 season is Sreenidi Deccan Football Club's Second season. They participated in the I-League.

On 5 June 2020, All India Football Federation issued an invitation to accept bids for new clubs to join the I-League from 2020 onwards; on 12 August, Sreenidi Deccan were granted playing rights directly in the 2021–22 season.

== First-team squad ==
As of 1 November 2022

Note: Flags indicate national team as defined under FIFA eligibility rules; some limited exceptions apply. Players may hold more than one non-FIFA nationality.

No.	Pos.	Nation	Player
1	GK	(India) IND	Ubaid CK
2	DF	(India) IND	Shahabaaz Khan
3	DF	(India) IND	Bijay Chhetri
4	DF	(India) IND	Md Abdul Salam
5	DF	(India) IND	Soraisham Dinesh Singh
6	MF	(India) IND	Phalguni Singh
7	FW	(India) IND	Vanlalbiaa Chhangte
8	MF	(India) IND	Umashankar Marimuthu
10	MF	(Afghanistan) AFG	Faysal Shayesteh
11	FW	(Colombia) COL	David Castañeda (Captain)
12	DF	(India) IND	Asheer Akhtar
13	MF	(India) IND	Mayakkannan
14	DF	(India) IND	Arijit Bagui
15	DF	(India) IND	Asraf Ali Mondal
16	FW	(India) IND	Vineeth Velmurugan

No.	Pos.	Nation	Player
17	FW	(India) IND	Rosenberg Gabriel
19	FW	(India) IND	Songpu Singsit
21	FW	(India) IND	Lalromawia
22	MF	(India) IND	Sriram Boopathi
23	GK	(India) IND	Jaspreet Singh
25	GK	(India) IND	Harsh Patil
26	DF	(India) IND	Sunil Bathala
27	FW	(India) IND	Mayosing Khongreiwoshi
36	MF	(India) IND	Suraj Rawat
41	GK	(India) IND	Aryan Niraj Lamba
46	FW	(India) IND	Ramhlunchhunga (on loan from Hyderabad)
49	DF	(Ghana) GHA	Mohamed Awal
53	MF	(Republic of the Congo) CGO	Dua Stanislas Ankira
77	MF	(Nigeria) NGA	Rilwan Hassan
99	FW	(Nigeria) NGA	Ogana Louis

== Transfers and loans ==
=== Transfers in ===
Entry date	Position	Player	Previous club	Fee	Ref.
11 August 2022	GK	Jaspreet Singh	(India) RoundGlass Punjab	None	
13 August 2022	DF	Asheer Akhtar	(India) Mohammedan	None	
16 August 2022	FW	Ramhlunchhunga	(India) Hyderabad	None	Loan
18 August 2022	LW	Songpu Singsit	(India) East Bengal	None	
20 August 2022	DF	Md Abdul Salam	(India) NEROCA	None	
22 August 2022	LB	Asraf Ali Mondal	(India) Bengaluru United	None	
24 August 2022	MF	(Afghanistan) Faysal Shayesteh	(Netherlands) VV DUNO	None	
5 January 2023	MF	(Republic of the Congo) Dua Stanislas Ankira	(Morocco) Difaâ El Jadida	None	
5 February 2023	MF	(Nigeria) Rilwan Hassan	(Norway) HamKam	None	

=== Transfers Out ===
Exit date	Position	Player	To club	Fee	Ref.
18 June 2022	DF	Girik Khosla	(India) Real Kashmir	None	
24 August 2022	FW	Mc Malsawmzuala	(India) Chawnpui FC	None	
24 August 2022	LB	Mohamed Salah	(India) RoundGlass Punjab	None	
24 August 2022	RB	Samad Ali Mallick	(India) Mohammedan	None	
24 August 2022	GK	Shibinraj Kunniyil	(India) Gokulam Kerala	None	
24 August 2022	MF	Shibil Muhammed	Bengaluru United	None	
24 August 2022	FW	KP Rahul		None	
25 December 2022	DF	Lalchungnunga	(India) East Bengal	Undisclosed	

=== Loans Out ===
Exit date	Position	Player	To club	Fee	Ref.
18 June 2021	DF	Lalchungnunga	(India) East Bengal	None	

== Technical staff ==
As of 3 August 2022

Role	Name
Head coach	(Portugal) Carlos Vaz Pinto
Assistant coach	(India) Birendra Thapa
Conditioning coach	(Mexico) Jorge Ovando Toledo
Goalkeeping coach	TBA
Performance Analyst	(India) Saiguhan E.

== Pre-season ==
v

== I-League ==
=== League table ===
Pos	Team	Pld	W	D	L	GF	GA	GD	Pts	Qualification
1	RoundGlass Punjab (C, P)	22	16	4	2	45	16	+29	52	Champions, Promotion to 2023–24 Indian Super League
2	Sreenidi Deccan	22	13	3	6	44	29	+15	42	
3	Gokulam Kerala	22	12	3	7	26	14	+12	39	
4	TRAU	22	11	2	9	34	34	0	35	
5	Real Kashmir	22	9	7	6	27	25	+2	34	

Source: I-League
Rules for classification: 1) points; 2) head-to-head points; 3) head-to-head goal difference; 4) goal difference; 5) number of goals scored; 6) drawing of lots
(C) Champions; (P) Promoted

=== Matches ===
Note: I-league announced the fixtures for the 2022–23 season on 1 November 2022.

14 November 2022 1	Punjab	2-1	Sreenidi Deccan	Mohali
16.30 IST			Shahabaaz Khan 58'	Stadium: Tau Devi Lal Stadium

19 November 2022 2	Churchill Brothers	2-3	Sreenidi Deccan	Margao
16.30 IST			Songpu Singsit 25'; Ogana Louis 40'; David Castañeda 67'	Stadium: GMC Athletic Stadium

24 November 2022 3	Sreenidi Deccan	1-0	TRAU	Hyderabad
14.00 IST	David Castañeda 41'			Stadium: Deccan Arena

27 November 2022 4	Sreenidi Deccan	1–0	Gokulam Kerala	Hyderabad
14.00 IST	Shayesteh 63'	Report	Kumar (yellow card) 12'; Bouba (yellow card) 35'	Stadium: Deccan Arena; Attendance: 1,013; Referee: Ashish Tiwari; Man of the Match: Faysal Shayesteh (Sreenidi Deccan)

1 December 2022 5	Sreenidi Deccan	4-3	Mohammedan	Hyderabad
14.00 IST	Shayesteh 43'; Mohamed Awal 69'; David Castañeda 70' 80'			Stadium: Deccan Arena

2 December 2022 6	Real Kashmir	2-1	Sreenidi Deccan	Srinagar
14.00 IST			Asheer Akhtar 12'	Stadium: TRC Turf Ground

11 December 2022 7	Sreenidi Deccan	3-3	Aizawl	Hyderabad
14.00 IST	Castañeda 4' 43'; Sriram Boopathi 90+1'	Report		Stadium: Deccan Arena

2 December 2022 8	Sudeva Delhi	0-3	Sreenidi Deccan	New Delhi
19.00 IST	Castañeda 35' 58' 87'	Report		Stadium: Chhatrasal Stadium

21 December 2022 9	NEROCA	0-1	Sreenidi Deccan	Imphal
16.00 IST		Report	Ramhlunchhunga 47'	Stadium: Khuman Lampak Main Stadium

7 January 2023 10	Sreenidi Deccan	1-0	Mumbai Kenkre	Hyderabad
14.00 IST	Faysal Shayesteh 19'	Report		Stadium: Deccan Arena

11 January 2023 11	Rajasthan United	1-0	Sreenidi Deccan	New Delhi
19.00 IST		Report		Stadium: Ambedkar Stadium

17 January 2023 12	Sreenidi Deccan	4-0	RoundGlass Punjab	Hyderabad
14.00 IST	Shahabaaz Khan 12'; Castañeda 30' 88'; Mohamed Awal (yellow card) 45+5'; Dinesh Singh 62'	Report	Luka Majcen (yellow card) 45+4'	Stadium: Deccan Arena; Attendance: 500; Referee: MRUTYUNJAY; Man of the Match: Castañeda

23 January 2023 13	Mumbai Kenkre	2-1	Sreenidi Deccan	Mumbai
19.00 IST		Report	Ogana Louis 77'	Stadium: Cooperage Ground

29 January 2023 14	Sreenidi Deccan	3-2	NEROCA	Hyderabad
14.00 IST	Faysal Shayesteh 3'; David Castañeda 45+3'; Rosenberg Gabriel 74'			Stadium: Deccan Arena

4 February 2023 15	Sreenidi Deccan	3-0	Churchill Brothers	Hyderabad
14.00 IST	David Castañeda 55' (P); Ramhlunchhunga 70'; Ogana Louis 90+3'			Stadium: Deccan Arena

7 February 2023 16	TRAU	1-2	Sreenidi Deccan	Imphal
14.00 IST	Komron Tursunov (yellow card) 15'; Gerard Williams (yellow card) 59'; Gérson Vieira (yellow card) 65'; Salam Johnson Singh (yellow card) 70'; Pritam Singh 90+4'	Report	Arijit Bagui (yellow card) 7'; Asheer Akhtar 37'; Shahabaaz Khan (yellow card) 66'; Phalguni Singh 90+2'	Stadium: Khuman Lampak Main Stadium; Attendance: 2,876; Referee: JATINDER SINGH; Man of the Match: Asheer Akhtar (Sreenidi Deccan)

12 February 2023 17	Sreenidi Deccan	2–0	Rajasthan United	Hyderabad
15.00 IST	Akhtar 5'; Lalromawia 40'	Report	M. Assisi (yellow card) 24'; Gurung (yellow card) 71' (yellow-red card) 90+4'; Amangeldiev (yellow card) 74'; Amritpal (yellow card) 84'	Stadium: Deccan Arena; Attendance: 198; Referee: K Ramdasan; Man of the Match: David Castañeda (Sreenidi Deccan)

19 February 2023 18	Sreenidi Deccan	3-1	Sudeva Delhi	Hyderabad
14.00 IST	David Castañeda 71'; * Ogana Louis 81' 89'			Stadium: Deccan Arena

24 February 2023 19	Mohammedan	6-4	Sreenidi Deccan	Kolkata
16.30 IST			Rilwan Hassan 3'; David Castañeda 28'; Ogana Louis 79'; Rosenberg Gabriel 90+3'	Stadium: Kishore Bharati Krirangan

28 February 2023 20	Aizawl	1-1	Sreenidi Deccan	Aizawl
16.30 IST			Rilwan Hassan 80'	Stadium: Rajiv Gandhi Stadium

5 March 2023 21	Sreenidi Deccan	2-2	Real Kashmir	Hyderabad
16.30 IST	Dinesh Singh 86' Rosenberg Gabriel 90+1'			Stadium: Deccan Arena

12 March 2023 22	Gokulam Kerala	1-0	Sreenidi Deccan	Calicut
16.30 IST				Stadium: EMS Stadium

== Super Cup ==
After finishing 2nd in the I-League, Sreenidhi played a qualifier against qualifying play off winners, NEROCA, which after winning, earned a place in the group stage.

=== Matches ===
Win Draw Loss

=== Qualifiers ===
5 April 2023 Q-1	Sreenidi Deccan	4–2	NEROCA	Manjeri
17:00 IST	Shayesteh 37'; Castañeda 55'; Olanrewaju 90+1' (90+3)	Report	Ragui 67'; Benjamin 80'	Stadium: Payyanad Stadium; Man of the Match: Rilwan Olanrewaju Hassan

=== Group Stage ===
==== Group A ====
Pos	Team	Pld	W	D	L	GF	GA	GD	Pts		BEN	SRD	KER	RGP
1	Bengaluru	3	1	2	0	4	2	+2	5	Advance to knockout stage	—	1–1	1–1	—
2	Sreenidi Deccan	3	1	1	1	3	2	+1	4 (Note: Head-to-head points: Sreenidi Deccan 3, Kerala Blasters 0.)		—	—	2–0	—
3	Kerala Blasters	3	1	1	1	4	4	0	4		—	—	—	3–1
4	Punjab	3	1	0	2	2	5	−3	3		0–2	1–0	—	—

Source: AIFF
Rules for classification: 1) points; 2) head-to-head points; 3) head-to-head goal difference; 4) goal difference; 5) number of goals scored; 6) drawing of lots

==== Matches ====
8 April 2023 1	Bengaluru	1–1	Sreenidi Deccan FC	Kozhikode
17:00 IST	Hernández 10'	Report	Shayesteh 21'; Dinesh (yellow card) 24'	Stadium: EMS Stadium; Attendance: 3,214; Referee: Rowan Arumughan; Man of the Match: Bijay Chhetri (Sreenidi Deccan)

12 April 2023 2	Sreenidi Deccan FC	2–0	Kerala Blasters	Kozhikode
17:30 IST	Hassan 17'; Castañeda 44'; Dinesh (yellow card) 64'	Report	Adhikari (yellow card) 16'; Jeakson (yellow card) 59'; Diamantakos (yellow card) 89'	Stadium: EMS Stadium; Attendance: 7,458; Referee: Aditya Purkayastha; Man of the Match: Phalguni Singh (Sreenidi Deccan)

16 April 2023 3	RoundGlass Punjab	1–0	Sreenidi Deccan	Manjeri, Kerala
20:30 IST	Valpuia (yellow card) 7' (goal) 41'; F. Lallawmawma (yellow card) 71'	Report	Bagui (yellow card) 45+4'	Stadium: Payyanad Stadium; Attendance: 2,023; Referee: I Jamal Mohamed; Man of the Match: Kiran Chemjong (RoundGlass Punjab)

== Statistics ==
=== Goal Scorers ===
As of 12 April 2023

Rank	No.	Pos.	Nat.	Name	I League	IFA Shield	Super Cup	Total
1	11	FW	(Colombia)	David Castañeda	15	0	2	17
2	10	MF	(Afghanistan)	Faysal Shayesteh	4	0	2	6
3	77	MF	(Nigeria)	Rilwan Hassan	2	0	3	5
3	99	FW	(Nigeria)	Ogana Louis	5	0	0	5
5	12	DF	(India)	Asheer Akhtar	3	0	0	3
5	17	FW	(India)	Rosenberg Gabriel	3	0	0	3
7	2	DF	(India)	Shahabaaz Khan	2	0	0	2
7	46	FW	(India)	Ramhlunchhunga	2	0	0	2
9	5	DF	(India)	Soraisham Dinesh Singh	1	0	0	1
9	6	MF	(India)	Phalguni Singh	1	0	0	1
9	19	FW	(India)	Songpu Singsit	1	0	0	1
9	21	FW	(India)	Lalromawia	1	0	0	1
9	22	MF	(India)	Sriram Boopathi	1	0	0	1
9	49	DF	(Ghana)	Mohamed Awal	1	0	0	1
Own Goals					0	0	0	0
Total					42	0	7	49
