= 2024–25 Sreenidi Deccan FC season =

2024–25 season of Sreenidi Deccan FC

Sreenidi Deccan
2024–25 season
- Owner: Sreenidhi Group
- Head coach: Rui Amorim
- Stadium: Deccan Arena
- I-League: TBD
- Super Cup: TBD

The 2024–25 season is Sreenidi Deccan Football Club's fourth season. They will participate in the I-League. This is their first season under Spaniard Domingo Oramas who was announced as the new head coach on 3 August 2024. on 24th September club has decided to terminate the contract of head coach Domingo Oramas and his staff and they appoint portuguese Rui Amorim as new head coach.

== Technical staff ==
As of December 2024

Role	Name	Refs.
Head coach		
Assistant coach	(India) Ishant Singh	
Goalkeeping coach	(Portugal) Rafael Gracio	
Conditioning coach	(Mexico) Jorge Ovando Toledo	
Team manager	(India) Subhabrata Dey	
Performance analyst	(India) Alemso Tawsik	
Physiotherapist	(India) Prabhakaran Nataraj	
Reserve team coach	(India) Subam Rabha	

== First-team squad ==
As of 31 January 2024

Note: Flags indicate national team as defined under FIFA eligibility rules; some limited exceptions apply. Players may hold more than one non-FIFA nationality.

No.	Pos.	Nation	Player
1	GK	(India) IND	Ubaid CK
2	DF	(India) IND	Shahabaaz Khan
5	DF	(India) IND	Pawan Kumar
6	MF	(India) IND	Lalnuntluanga Bawitlung
7	FW	(Brazil) BRA	William Alves
8	MF	(India) IND	Kean Lewis
10	MF	(Afghanistan) AFG	Faysal Shayesteh
11	FW	(Colombia) COL	David Castañeda (captain)
12	DF	(India) IND	Mohammad Sajid Dhot
14	MF	(India) IND	Arun Kumar
15	DF	(India) IND	Asraf Ali Mondal
17	FW	(India) IND	Rosenberg Gabriel
19	FW	(India) IND	Songpu Singsit
21	FW	(India) IND	Lalromawia

No.	Pos.	Nation	Player
22	DF	(Brazil) BRA	Eli Sabiá
23	GK	(India) IND	Jaspreet Singh
24	DF	(India) IND	Arijit Bagui
25	DF	(India) IND	Subhankar Adhikari
26	DF	(India) IND	Sunil Bathala
27	DF	(India) IND	Abhishek Ambekar
29	MF	(India) IND	Brandon Vanlalremdika
33	DF	(India) IND	Jagdeep Singh
41	GK	(India) IND	Aryan Niraj Lamba
42	MF	(India) IND	R Lawmnasangzuala
48	MF	(India) IND	Lalbiakliana
50	FW	(India) IND	Emboklang Nongkhlaw
55	DF	(India) IND	Gurmukh Singh
77	MF	(Nigeria) NGA	Rilwan Hassan
—	FW	(Panama) PAN	Ángel Orelien
—	MF	(India) IND	Ajay Chhetri

== Transfers and loans ==
=== New contracts ===
Date	Position	NO	Player	Ref.

=== Transfers in ===
Entry date	Position	Player	Previous club	Fee	Ref.
10 August 2024	FW	(Panama) Ángel Orelien	(France) Dunkerque	Free Transfer	
16 August 2024	MF	(India) Ajay Chhetri	(India) Bengaluru	Free Transfer	
28 August 2024	MF	(Curaçao) Roly Bonevacia	(Australia) Melbourne Victory	Free Transfer	

=== Transfers out ===
Exit date	Position	Player	To club	Fee	Ref.
26 June 2024	MF	(India) Mayakkannan	NorthEast United	Free Transfer	
13 July 2024	GK	(Brazil) Albino Gomes	Jamshedpur	Free Transfer	
1 June 2024	MF	(Ivory Coast) Ibrahim Sissoko	–	Free Transfer	

=== Loans out ===
Exit date	Position	Player	To club	Fee	Ref.

== Pre-season ==
18 August 2024 Friendly	Goa	2–0	Sreenidi Deccan	Margao
15:30 IST				Stadium: Fatorda Stadium

13 September 2024 Friendly	Sreenidi Deccan	1–0	Hyderabad	Hyderabad
10:30 IST				Stadium: Deccan Arena

== Competitions ==
=== I-League ===
==== League table ====
Pos	Team	Pld	W	D	L	GF	GA	GD	Pts
6	Shillong Lajong	19	7	5	7	41	39	+2	26
7	Namdhari	19	7	5	7	25	24	+1	26 (Note: Namdhari were deducted three points for fielding an ineligible player in Match 45 against Inter Kashi.)
8	Sreenidi Deccan	19	7	5	7	31	33	−2	26
9	Dempo	19	6	4	9	25	27	−2	22
10	Sporting Bengaluru	19	5	5	9	20	36	−16	20

Updated to match(es) played on 18 March 2025. Source: I-League
Rules for classification: 1) Points; 2) Head-to-head points; 3) Head-to-head goal difference; 4) Total goal difference; 5) Total number of goals scored; 6) drawing of lots
(Note: Head-to-head record is used only after all the matches between the teams in question have been played).
