= 2021 IFA Shield =

২০২১ আইএফএ শিল্ড

Tournament details
- Country: India
- Dates: 24 November – 15 December
- Teams: 16

Final positions
- Champions: Real Kashmir (2nd title)
- Runners-up: Sreenidi Deccan

Tournament statistics
- Matches played: 14
- Goals scored: 35 (2.5 per match)
- Top goal scorer: Rahim Osumanu (5 goals)

The 2021 IFA Shield was the 124th edition of the IFA Shield. It had 1 Indian Super League team, 5 I-League teams and 10 Calcutta Premier Division teams. Real Kashmir defended their title defeating Sreenidi Deccan in the final.

== Teams ==
Group	Team	Location
A	Real Kashmir	Srinagar, Jammu Kashmir
A	Calcutta Customs	Kolkata, West Bengal
A	Indian Arrows	Bhubaneswar, Odisha
B	Aryan	Kolkata, West Bengal
B	Peerless	Kolkata, West Bengal
B	Hyderabad FC B	Hyderabad, Telangana
C	BSS	Kolkata, West Bengal
C	Gokulam Kerala	Calicut, Kerala
C	Kidderpore	Kolkata, West Bengal
D	Southern Samity	Kolkata, West Bengal
D	Bhawanipore	Kolkata, West Bengal
D	Sreenidi Deccan	Vizag, Andhra Pradesh

Qualification	Team	Location
Direct qualify to QuarterFinal	Mohammedan	Kolkata, West Bengal
Direct qualify to QuarterFinal	George Telegraph	Kolkata, West Bengal
Direct qualify to QuarterFinal	United	Kolkata, West Bengal
Direct qualify to QuarterFinal	Railway	Kolkata, West Bengal

== Group stage ==
=== Group A ===
Pos	Team	Pld	W	D	L	GF	GA	GD	Pts	
1	Real Kashmir	2	1	0	1	3	1	+2	3	Advance to the pre quarterfinals
2	Calcutta Customs	2	1	0	1	1	1	0	3	Advance to the pre quarterfinals
3	Indian Arrows	2	1	0	1	1	3	−2	3	

Source: kolkatafootball.com

24 November 2021
14:00 IST

Real Kashmir	3–0	Indian Arrows
Fran Gonzalez 18'; Pratesh Shirodkar 23'; Thoi Singh 88'

East Bengal Ground, Kolkata
Referee: K. Ramdasan
28 November 2021
14:00 IST

Real Kashmir	0–1	Calcutta Customs
		Rabi Hansda 45+1'

East Bengal Ground, Kolkata
Referee: Ashish Tiwari
1 December 2021
14:00 IST

Indian Arrows	1–0	Calcutta Customs
Sibajit Singh Leimapokpam

East Bengal Ground, Kolkata
Referee: Mritunjay. A

=== Group B ===
Pos	Team	Pld	W	D	L	GF	GA	GD	Pts	
1	Aryan	2	2	0	0	2	0	+2	6	Advance to the pre quarterfinals
2	Peerless	2	0	1	1	1	2	−1	1	Advance to the pre quarterfinals
3	Hyderabad B	2	0	1	1	1	2	−1	1	

Source: kolkatafootball.com

27 November 2021
14:00 IST

Hyderabad B	0–1	Aryan
		Dip Saha 65'

Kalyani Stadium, Kolkata
Referee: Mritunjay. A
30 November 2021
14:00 IST

Hyderabad B	1–1	Peerless
C. Lalchungnunga		Harsha Parui

Kalyani Stadium, Kalyani
Referee: Ashish Tiwari
3 December 2021
14:00 IST

Aryan	1–0	Peerless
Aristide Tchuitchou

East Bengal Ground, Kolkata
Referee: K. Ramdasan

=== Group C ===
Pos	Team	Pld	W	D	L	GF	GA	GD	Pts	
1	Gokulam Kerala	2	1	1	0	8	1	+7	4	Advance to the pre quarterfinals
2	Kidderpore	2	1	0	1	1	7	−6	3	Advance to the pre quarterfinals
3	BSS	2	0	1	1	1	2	−1	1	

Source: kolkatafootball.com

26 November 2021
14:00 IST

Gokulam Kerala	7–0	Kidderpore
Nitish Hazra 4' (o.g.); Abhijith K 53'; Ronald Singh 58', 67'; Rahim Osumanu 71', 72'; Beneston Barreto 85'

Naihati Stadium, Naihati
Referee: Jamal Ahmed
29 November 2021
13:30 IST

Gokulam Kerala	1–1	BSS
Rahim Osumanu 45'		Leoncé Dodoz 42'

Kalyani Stadium, Kalyani
2 December 2021
14:00 IST

Kidderpore	1–0	BSS
Dama Coulibaly (pen.)

Sailen Manna Stadium, Howrah
Referee: Lakshay Tushir

=== Group D ===
Pos	Team	Pld	W	D	L	GF	GA	GD	Pts	
1	Sreenidi Deccan	2	2	0	0	5	1	+4	6	Advance to the pre quarterfinals
2	Bhawanipore	2	1	0	1	4	2	+2	3	Advance to the pre quarterfinals
3	Southern Samity	2	0	0	2	2	8	−6	0	

Source: kolkatafootball.com

26 November 2021
14:00 IST

Sreenidi Deccan	4–1	Southern Samity
Castañeda; Malsawmzuala; Lalromawia		Vishal Das

Kalyani Stadium, Kalyani
29 November 2021
14:00 IST

Sreenidi Deccan	1–0	Bhawanipore
Malsawmzuala

Kalyani Stadium, Kalyani
Referee: Jamal Ahmed
2 December 2021
14:00 IST

Bhawanipore	4–1	Southern Samity
Kamo Stephane Bayi; Sujay Dutta; Sonam Bhutia (o.g.)		Rahul Jaiswal

Kalyani Stadium, Kalyani

== Knockout stage ==
=== Bracket ===
Pre-quarterfinals; 5–6 December 2021
Real Kashmir	2
Bhawanipore	1
Peerless	1
Gokulam Kerala	2
Aryan	0(5)
Kidderpore	0(3)
Calcutta Customs	0
Sreenidi Deccan	2

Quarterfinals; 8–9 December 2021
Mohammedan	0
Real Kashmir	1
United	2(4)
Gokulam Kerala	2(5)
Railway	3
Aryan	0
George Telegraph	0
Sreenidi Deccan	1

Semifinals; 12 December 2021
Real Kashmir	2
Gokulam Kerala	1
Railway	1
Sreenidi Deccan	2

Final; 15 December 2021
Real Kashmir	2
Sreenidi Deccan	1

=== Pre Quarter-finals ===
5 December 2021
13:30 IST

Calcutta Customs	0–2	Sreenidi Deccan
		Castaneda; Malsawmzuala (pen.)

Naihati Stadium, Naihati

5 December 2021
13:30 IST

Real Kashmir	2–1	Bhawanipore
Tiago Adan; Robertson		Kamo Stephane Bayi

Kalyani Stadium, Kalyani
Referee: Jamal Ahmed

6 December 2021
13:30 IST

Gokulam Kerala	2–1	Peerless
Osumanu 50', 100' (pen.)		Amit Tudu

Naihati Stadium, Naihati
Referee: Ashish Tiwari

6 December 2021
13:30 IST

Kidderpore	0–0	Aryan
Penalties
	3–5

Kalyani Stadium, Kalyani
Referee: Mrityunjay A.

=== Quarterfinals ===
8 December 2021
01:30 pm IST

Mohammedan	0–1 (a.e.t.)	Real Kashmir
		Lalchhawnkima

Kalyani Stadium, Kalyani

8 December 2021
01:30 pm IST

Sreenidi Deccan	1–0	George Telegraph
Lalromawia 70'

East Bengal Ground, Kolkata

9 December 2021
01:30 pm IST

United	2–2 (a.e.t.)	Gokulam Kerala
Murmu; Dauda
Penalties
	4–5

Kalyani Stadium, Kalyani
Referee: Jamal Ahmed

9 December 2021
01:30 pm IST

Railway	3–0	Aryan
Monotosh Maji 11'; Tanmoy Das 40', 50'

Mohun Bagan Ground, Kolkata
Referee: Ashish Tiwari

=== Semi-final ===
12 December 2021
01:30 pm IST

Real Kashmir	2–1	Gokulam Kerala
Robertson 23'; Thoi Singh 30'		Ronald Singh 45+2'

Kalyani Stadium, Kalyani
Referee: Lakshay Tushir

12 December 2021
01:30 pm IST

Railway	1–2 (a.e.t.)	Sreenidi Deccan
Kelvin Kellie 14' (pen.)		Konsam Phalguni Singh 2'; Malsawmzuala 118'

East Bengal Ground, Kolkata
Referee: K. Ramdasan

=== Final ===
15 December 2021
01:30 pm IST

Real Kashmir	2–1 (a.e.t.)	Sreenidi Deccan
González 90+3'; Awal 100' (o.g.)		Castañeda 30'

East Bengal Ground, Kolkata
Referee: Jamal Ahmed

== Statistics ==
As of 5 December 2021

=== Top goal scorers ===
Rank	Nat.	Player	Club	Goals
1	(Ghana)	Rahim Osumanu	Gokulam Kerala	5
2	(India)	MC Malsawmzuala	Sreenidi Deccan	4
3	(Colombia)	David Castaneda	Sreenidi Deccan	3
3	(Ivory Coast)	Kamo Stephane Bayi	Bhawanipore	3
3	(India)	Ronald Singh	Gokulam Kerala	3
