= Bijay Chhetri =

Indian footballer (born 2001)

Personal information
- Date of birth: 7 July 2001 (age 25)
- Place of birth: Kanglatongbi, Imphal, Manipur
- Height: 1.84 m (6 ft 1/2 in)
- Position: Centre-back

Team information
- Current team: Mumbai City

Youth career
- 2016–2018: Shillong Lajong

Senior career*
Years	Team	Apps	(Gls)
2018–2019	Indian Arrows	16	(4)
2019–2021	Chennai City	8	(1)
2021	Real Kashmir	7	(2)
2021–2023	Sreenidi Deccan	10	(1)
2023–2025	Chennaiyin	0	(0)
2024–2025	→ Colón (loan)	1	(0)
2025–	Mumbai City	8	(0)
- * Club domestic league appearances and goals as of 16:50, 18 April 2026 (UTC)

Bijay Chhetri (born 7 July 2001) is an Indian professional footballer who plays as a defender for Indian Super League club Mumbai City.

== Youth career ==
Bijay started his footballing career at Shillong Lajong in 2016 playing for their Under-16 team and got promoted to the Under 18 and played 2 years at Lajong. He moved to Indian Arrows in the 2018–2019 season, but because of a serious injury, he was unable to play any matches for the club.

== Club career ==
=== Chennai City ===
Chhetri made his professional debut for Chennai City against Aizawl on 17 December 2019, He started and played full match which drew 1–1.

=== Colón ===
On 27 March 2024, Chhetri signed for Uruguayan Segunda División club Colón on loan for rest of the year. Chhetri made his debut that November in a 5–0 win over La Luz, coming on as a substitute and becoming only the second Indian to play in South America's professional leagues after Romeo Fernandes.

Following a brief limited playing spell, Colón opted to sign Chhetri permanently. He announced this transfer on social media, becoming the first Indian player to move full-time to a South American club.

=== Mumbai City ===
After his one-year stint in Uruguay, ISL club Mumbai City announced Bijay's signing on October 9.

== Personal life ==
He has an older brother Ajay Chhetri who is also a professional footballer currently playing at Sreenidi Deccan FC.

== Career statistics ==
=== Club ===
As of 16 April 2023

Club	Season	League			Cup		Continental		Total	
Club	Season	Division	Apps	Goals	Apps	Goals	Apps	Goals	Apps	Goals
Indian Arrows	2018–19	I-League	0	0	0	0	–		0	0
Chennai City	2019–20	I-League	2	0	0	0	–		2	0
Real Kashmir	2020–21	I-League	5	0	0	0	–		5	0
Sreenidi Deccan	2021–22	I-League	5	0	0	0	–		5	0
Sreenidi Deccan	2022–23	I-League	1	0	4 (Note: Appearance(s) in Super Cup)	0	–		5	0
Sreenidi Deccan	Total		6	0	4	0	0	0	10	0
Chennaiyin	2023–24	Indian Super League	0	0	0	0	–		0	0
Colón (loan)	2024	Uruguayan Segunda División	1	0	0	0	–		1	0
Colón	2025	Uruguayan Segunda División	0	0	0	0	–		0	0
Mumbai City	2025–26	Indian Super League	0	0	3	0	–		3	0
Career total			14	0	7	0	0	0	21	0

== See also ==
- List of Indian expatriate footballers
