= Ramhlunchhunga =

Indian footballer

Personal information
- Full name: Ramhlunchhunga Hmar
- Date of birth: 24 April 2001 (age 25)
- Place of birth: Kolasib, Mizoram, India
- Height: 1.69 m (5 ft 7 in)
- Position: Winger

Team information
- Current team: Kerala Blasters

Youth career
- UDream Academy
- Electric Veng

Senior career*
Years	Team	Apps	(Gls)
2020–2022	Aizawl	32	(3)
2022–2026	SC Delhi	44	(3)
2022–2023	→ Sreenidi Deccan (loan)	22	(2)
2026–	Kerala Blasters	0	(0)
- * Club domestic league appearances and goals as of 23:24, 19 March 2026 (UTC)

Ramhlunchhunga Hmar (born 24 April 2001), commonly known as Chhunga Hmar, is an Indian professional footballer who plays as a forward for Indian Super League club Kerala Blasters.

== Club career ==
=== Aizawl ===
On 1 January 2020, Ramhlunchhunga was signed by Aizawl FC from Electric Veng.

He made his professional debut for the club against Gokulam Kerala FC, on 4 January 2020. He was brought in as substitute in the 92nd minute, as Aizawl FC drew 1–1.

On 27 December 2021, Ramhlunchhunga scored his first professional goal, against Real Kashmir FC, in a 3–2 loss.

=== Hyderabad FC ===
On 27 July 2022, Indian Super League side Hyderabad FC from Aizawl. Shortly after signing, Chhunga was sent on loan to I-League club Sreenidi Deccan.

==== Loan to Sreenidi Deccan ====
On 16 August 2022, Chhunga was announced by Sreenidi Deccan on a one-year-loan deal. He made his debut for the club on 14 November 2022 against Punjab FC.

Chhunga's first goal for the club came on 21 December 2022 away against NEROCA FC, scoring the only goal for Sreenidi in a 1–0 win.

Over the spell of his loan, Chhunga accumulated 2 goals and 6 assists in 22 games for the club.

==== Return to Hyderabad FC ====
After his return to the Nizams, Chhunga made his ISL debut for the club on 25 November 2023 away against Kerala Blasters, coming on as a late substitute for Mohammad Yasir in an eventual 1–0 loss for Hyderabad.

His first goal for Hyderabad came on 24 February 2024 away against Bengaluru FC, scoring a rebound from close range in an eventual 2–1 loss for the club. This ended up being his only goal contribution for the 2023–24 season.

== Career statistics ==
=== Club ===
As of 26 October 2024

Club	Season	League			Cup		AFC		Total	
Club	Season	Division	Apps	Goals	Apps	Goals	Apps	Goals	Apps	Goals
Aizawl	2019–20	I-League	6	0	0	0	–		6	0
Aizawl	2020–21	I-League	10	0	0	0	–		10	0
Aizawl	2021–22	I-League	16	3	0	0	–		16	3
Aizawl	Total		32	3	0	0	0	0	32	3
Sreenidi Deccan (loan)	2022–23	I-League	22	2	4 (Note: Appearance(s) in Super Cup)	0	–		26	2
Hyderabad	2023–24	Indian Super League	16	1	6 (Note: Appearance(s) in Durand Cup)	3	–		14	3
Hyderabad	2024–25	Indian Super League	23	2	1	0	–		5	0
Hyderabad	Total		38	2	6	3	0	0	44	5
SC Delhi	2025-26	Indian Super League	5	0	2	0	_		7	0
Kerala Blasters	2026-27	Indian Super League					_			
Career total			98	8	13	3	0	0	102	10
