= David Castañeda (footballer) =

Colombian footballer (born 1995)

Personal information
- Full name: Juan David Castañeda Muñoz
- Date of birth: 26 January 1995 (age 31)
- Place of birth: Medellín, Colombia
- Height: 1.85 m (6 ft 1 in)
- Position: Striker

Team information
- Current team: Sreenidi Deccan
- Number: 11

Youth career
- Atlético Nacional

Senior career*
Years	Team	Apps	(Gls)
2014–2018	Atlético Nacional	8	(1)
2015	→ Leones (loan)	33	(12)
2016	→ Cortuluá (loan)	14	(0)
2017	→ Fortaleza CEIF (loan)	26	(8)
2018	→ Real San Andrés (loan)	23	(2)
2019–2020	Patriotas Boyacá	28	(7)
2020–2021	Zakho	10	(4)
2021–	Sreenidi Deccan	90	(56)
- * Club domestic league appearances and goals as of 16:52, 3 May 2026 (UTC)

Juan David Castañeda Muñoz (born 26 January 1995) is a Colombian professional footballer who plays as a striker for Indian Football League club Sreenidi Deccan. Besides Colombia, he has played in Iraq and India.

== Club career ==
=== Sreenidi Deccan ===
On 20 September 2021, Castañeda joined Indian club Sreenidi Deccan, one of the new I-League entrants.

He debuted for the club, on 26 November 2021 in the 2021 IFA Shield opener against Southern Samity. He scored a brace in the match which ended in a 4–1 win. He made his I-League debut, on 27 December 2021 against NEROCA, in their 3–2 defeat in which he scored a goal. He then scored a brace against TRAU on 3 March 2022. He again scored a goal against Mohammedan in their 3–1 defeat. After finishing fourth in group stage with six wins in twelve matches, they moved to the championship stage. At the end, the club finished their maiden league campaign in third place with 32 points in 18 matches, and won the last match against Churchill Brothers on 14 May.

He was retained by the club in 2022–23 season. He maintained his goal scoring moment in that season, and finished as second highest scorer behind Luka Majcen. They later earned qualification to 2023 Indian Super Cup after win over NEROCA in playoffs. In the group stage opener on 8 April, they drew 1–1 with ISL outfit Bengaluru. He scored a goal on 13 April in their second match as the club thrashed Kerala Blasters by 2–0. In last group stage match against RoundGlass Punjab, they lost 1–0 and failed to progress to the next stage.

As the 2023–24 league season began, Castañeda helped the team clinching a 4–0 win over NEROCA, by scoring a brace.

== Career statistics ==
As of match played 3 May 2026

Appearances and goals by club, season and competition
Club	Season	League			National cup (Note: Includes Copa Colombia, Super Cup)		Continental		Other		Total	
Club	Season	Division	Apps	Goals	Apps	Goals	Apps	Goals	Apps	Goals	Apps	Goals
Atlético Nacional	2016	Categoría Primera A	8	1	—		1 (Note: Appearance(s) in Copa Libertadores)	0	—		9	1
Leones (loan)	2015	Categoría Primera B	33	12	3	1	—		—		36	13
Cortuluá (loan)	2016	Categoría Primera A	14	0	—		—		—		14	0
Fortaleza CEIF (loan)	2017	Categoría Primera B	26	8	2	1	—		—		28	9
Real San Andrés (loan)	2018	Categoría Primera B	23	2	2	1	—		—		25	3
Patriotas Boyacá	2019	Categoría Primera A	19	4	5	2	—		—		24	6
Patriotas Boyacá	2020	Categoría Primera A	9	3	—		—		—		9	3
Patriotas Boyacá	Total		28	7	5	2	—		—		33	9
Zakho	2020–21	Iraqi Premier League	10	4	—		—		—		10	4
Sreenidi Deccan	2021–22	I-League	16	10	—		—		5 (Note: Appearance(s) in IFA Shield)	3	21	13
Sreenidi Deccan	2022–23	I-League	21	15	3	2	—		—		24	17
Sreenidi Deccan	2023–24	I-League	20	11	3	0	—		—		23	11
Sreenidi Deccan	2024–25	I-League	22	17	0	0	—		—		22	17
Sreenidi Deccan	2025–26	Indian Football League	11	3	0	0	—		—		11	3
Sreenidi Deccan	Total		90	56	6	2	—		5	3	101	61
Career total			232	90	18	7	1	0	5	3	256	100

== Honours ==
Atlético Nacional

- Superliga Colombiana: 2016

Sreenidi Deccan

- I-League: runner-up 2022–23; third place 2021–22
- IFA Shield runner-up: 2021
