= Lalchhanhima Sailo (footballer) =

Indian footballer (born 2003)

Personal information
- Date of birth: 3 March 2003 (age 23)
- Place of birth: Mizoram, India
- Positions: Midfielder; winger

Youth career
- 2016–2018: Punjab U15

Senior career*
Years	Team	Apps	(Gls)
2019–2022	Indian Arrows	26	(1)
2022–2023	Aizawl	19	(3)
2023–2025	Hyderabad	12	(0)
2025	→ Aizawl	8	(0)

International career^{‡}
2017–2018	India U16	28	(1)
2019–2021	India U19	1	(0)
- * Club domestic league appearances and goals as of 20:23, 16 March 2025 (UTC) ‡ National team caps and goals as of 6 June 2020

Lalchhanhima Sailo (born 3 March 2003) is an Indian professional footballer who plays as a midfielder or winger.

== Club career ==
=== Indian Arrows ===
He made his I-League professional debut for Indian Arrows on 24 February 2020 at TRC Turf Ground against Real Kashmir F.C., he was brought in as substitute in the 72nd minute as they lost 1–0. He scored a goal for Arrows against Aizawl FC in which Arrows won the game by 2–1.

=== Aizawl ===
In August 2022, Sailo signed with fellow I-League club Aizawl for the 2022–23 season.

== International ==
Sailo was part of the Indian U-16 team that reached the quarterfinals of the 2018 AFC U-16 Championship in Malaysia.

== Career statistics ==
=== Club ===
As of 26 October 2024

Club	Season	League			Cup		AFC		Total	
Club	Season	Division	Apps	Goals	Apps	Goals	Apps	Goals	Apps	Goals
Indian Arrows	2019–20	I-League	2	0	0	0	–		2	0
Indian Arrows	2020–21	I-League	13	1	0	0	–		13	1
Indian Arrows	2021–22	I-League	11	0	0	0	–		11	0
Indian Arrows	Total		26	1	0	0	0	0	26	1
Aizawl	2022–23	I-League	19	3	4 (Note: Appearance(s) in Super Cup)	0	–		23	3
Hyderabad	2023–24	Indian Super League	11	0	3	0	–		14	0
Hyderabad	2024–25	Indian Super League	1	0	0	0	–		1	0
Hyderabad	Total		12	0	3	0	0	0	15	0
Career total			57	4	7	0	0	0	64	4

== Honours ==
=== International ===
- SAFF U-15 Championship

(gold) Winners (1): 2017
