= Antonio Rueda =

Spanish football manager (born 1981)

- Rueda with Churchill Brothers in 2022

Personal information
- Full name: Antonio Jesús Rueda Fernández
- Date of birth: 6 May 1981 (age 45)
- Place of birth: Estepa, Spain

Team information
- Current team: Sreenidi Deccan (head coach)

Managerial career
- Years: Team
- 2013–2016: AD Nervión
- 2017: Fuente de Cantos
- 2017–2018: San Roque de Lepe
- 2018: Mora
- 2019: Xerez
- 2019–2021: Olivenza
- 2022: Churchill Brothers
- 2023–2024: Ordino
- 2024–2025: Gokulam Kerala
- 2025–2026: Ordino (sporting director)
- 2026–: Sreenidi Deccan

Antonio Jesús Rueda Fernández (born May 6, 1981) is a Spanish professional football manager. He is currently the head coach of Indian Football League club Sreenidi Deccan.
