= Richard Towa =

Cameroonian footballer

Personal information
- Date of birth: 16 November 1969 (age 56)
- Place of birth: Douala, Cameroon

Senior career*
Years	Team	Apps	(Gls)
1984–1986	Unité de Douala		
1986–1988	Colombe de Sangmelima		
1988–1991	Panthère de Bangangté		
1991–1992	Fortuna Köln		
1992–1994	Fortuna Düsseldorf		

International career
	Cameroon	13	(0)

Managerial career
- 2002–2004: Fortuna Düsseldorf (youth)
- 2004–2008: Alemannia Aachen II
- 2008: KFC Uerdingen 05
- 2008–2010: KFC Uerdingen 05 (youth)
- 2010: Sportfreunde Siegen (assistant coach)
- 2010–2012: Cameroon U17
- 2012–2015: Les Astres FC (Director of Sport)
- 2015–2018: Cameroon U23
- 2018: Dragon Club
- 2018–2019: Feutcheu
- 2019–2021: Union Douala
- 2022: Gokulam Kerala
- 2023–: Colombe Sportive du Dja
- * Club domestic league appearances and goals

Richard Towa (born 16 November 1969) is a Cameroonian professional manager and former footballer. He currently manages Elite One club Colombe Sportive du Dja.

== Playing career ==
He played 13 matches for the Cameroon and helped them qualify for the 1990 FIFA World Cup, but did not participate due to an injury.

== Managerial career ==
In January 2018, he signed a contract to become manager of Dragon Club. He left in September 2018 to become new manager of Feutcheu FC. In April 2019, he resigned as manager of Feutcheu FC. On 5 December 2019, he was named new manager of Union Douala.

On 5 July 2022, Indian I-League defending champion Gokulam Kerala officially announced that they roped in Towa as their new head coach. He left by mutual consent on 26 December 2022 with the club in 4th place.

In November 2023, Towa became the manager of Elite One club Colombe Sportive du Dja.
