= Phalguni Singh Konsam =

Indian footballer

Phalguni Singh
Personal information
- Full name: Phalguni Singh Konsam
- Date of birth: 1 March 1995 (age 31)
- Place of birth: Manipur, India
- Height: 1.64 m (5 ft 5 in)
- Position: Central midfielder

Youth career
- NESU Khurai

Senior career*
Years	Team	Apps	(Gls)
2018–2021	TRAU	32	(4)
2021–2023	Sreenidi Deccan	38	(1)
2023–2025	NorthEast United	24	(3)
- * Club domestic league appearances and goals as of 17:00, 21 February 2025 (UTC)

Phalguni Singh Konsam (Meitei: Konsam Phalguni Singh, born 1 March 1995) is an Indian professional footballer who plays as a central midfielder.

== Club career ==
Born in Manipur, Phalguni Singh was a part of NESU Khurai which plays Manipur State League. During 2018–19 I-League 2nd Division season he joined TRAU FC. On 14 December 2019, Phalguni Singh made his professional debut in the I-League for Trau FC, against East Bengal. He scored his first ever goal in I League against Sudeva Delhi FC on 28 February 2021. He was awarded the best midfielders award and featured in the team of the season.

=== Sreenidi Deccan ===
On 8 September 2021, Phalguni signed a two-year contract with Sreenidi Deccan.

On 27 December 2021, he made his debut for the club against NEROCA, in a 3–2 loss. He was awarded his first Hero of the Match of the season, against Real Kashmir, on 11 March 2022.

== Career statistics ==
=== Club ===
As of 24 April 2025

Club	Season	League			Cup		Continental		Total	
Club	Season	Division	Apps	Goals	Apps	Goals	Apps	Goals	Apps	Goals
TRAU	2017–18	I-League 2nd Division	11	1	0	0	–		11	1
TRAU	2019–20	I-League	6	0	2 (Note: Appearance(s) in Durand Cup)	0	–		8	0
TRAU	2020–21	I-League	15	3	0	0	–		15	3
TRAU	Total		32	4	2	0	0	0	34	4
Sreenidi Deccan	2021–22	I-League	18	0	5 (Note: Appearance(s) in IFA Shield)	1	–		23	1
Sreenidi Deccan	2022–23	I-League	20	1	4 (Note: Appearance(s) in Super Cup)	0	–		24	1
Sreenidi Deccan	Total		38	1	9	1	0	0	47	2
NorthEast United	2023–24	Indian Super League	20	3	7	2	–		27	5
NorthEast United	2024–25	Indian Super League	4	0	3	0	–		7	0
NorthEast United	Total		24	3	10	2	0	0	34	5
Career total			94	8	21	3	0	0	115	11

== Honours ==
NorthEast United

- Durand Cup: 2024
