= Caetano Pinho =

Indian footballer and coach

Personal information
- Full name: Caetano Infancio De Souza Pinho
- Date of birth: 18 September 1976 (age 50)
- Place of birth: Margao, Goa, India
- Position: Midfielder

Team information
- Current team: Aizawl (manager)

Youth career
- Years: Team
- Salgaocar
- Vasco
- ONGC

Managerial career
- 2010–2012: ONGC
- 2019-2021: Baroda
- 2021–2022: Corbett
- 2022-: Aizawl
- 2023-: Baroda

Caetano Infancio De Souza Pinho (born 18 September 1976) is an Indian professional football manager. He last served as the head coach of the I-League club Aizawl.

== Early life ==
Pinho was born in Goa, India. All his family members were lawyers by profession. He then went to Don Bosco High School and Dempo College of Commerce and Economics. He then became an employer for Oil and Natural Gas Corporation.

== Coaching career ==
=== ONGC ===
In 1996, Pinho joined as the player of ONGC F.C. and went on to become the coach of ONGC in 2011 of the NFL 2nd Division. Before that he played for Salgaocar S.C., Vasco S.C. and even the ONGC after graduating from SAI Sports Hostel, Goa.

In 2010, Pinho became the assistant coach of the team going into the 2010–11 season of the I-League, their first ever. Unfortunately after one season with ONGC in the I-League, the club were relegated back into the I-League 2nd Division and Pinho's job was on the line as ONGC were considering folding the club and even Pinho himself said "The club’s poor showing had not gone down well with the management, who it was believed were even considering the most extreme of repercussions. For a company which supports 16 different disciplines of sports around the country, they had after all pumped in the maximum amount of money into the football club's coffers."

ONGC allowed the club to continue and next season, Pinho and ONGC were participating in the 2012 I-League 2nd Division where they ended as champions in the final round.

== Managerial statistics ==
As of match played 4 December 2024

Managerial record by team and tenure
Team	From	To	Record					Ref.
Team	From	To	P	W	D	L	Win %	Ref.
ONGC	2010	2011	38	11	13	14	28.9	
Baroda	2019	2021	—	−	−	−	—	
Corbett	2021	2022	—	−	−	−	—	
Aizawl	9 December 2022	Present	15	2	5	8	13.3	
Baroda	2023	Present	—	−	−	−	—	
Total			39	11	14	14	28.21	
