= Ronald Singh Shaikhom =

Indian footballer (born 1997)

Ronald Singh
Personal information
- Full name: Ronald Singh Shaikhom
- Date of birth: 16 February 1997 (age 29)
- Place of birth: India
- Height: 1.74 m (5 ft 9 in)
- Position: Attacking midfielder

Team information
- Current team: Measurers Club

Senior career*
Years	Team	Apps	(Gls)
?–2016	Minerva Punjab	0	(0)
2016–2017	Southern Samity	10	(2)
2017–18	ATK	2	(0)
2018	TRAU (loan)	6	(1)
2018–	NEROCA	22	(0)
- * Club domestic league appearances and goals as of 8:13, 7 March 2020 (UTC)

Ronald Singh Shaikhom (Meitei: Shaikhom Ronald Singh, born 17 February 1997) is an Indian professional footballer who plays as a midfielder for the Measurers Club in the Calcutta Football League.
