= Gurmukh Singh (footballer) =

Indian footballer

Personal information
- Date of birth: 1 January 1999 (age 27)
- Place of birth: Jalandhar, Punjab, India
- Height: 1.81 m (5 ft 11 1/2 in)
- Position: Centre-back

Team information
- Current team: Sreenidi Deccan

Youth career
- East Bengal
- Minerva Academy

Senior career*
Years	Team	Apps	(Gls)
2020	Techtro Swades	10	(0)
2021	Garhwal FC	0	(0)
2021–2022	Rajasthan United	22	(0)
2022–2023	Chennaiyin	10	(0)
2023–	Sreenidi Deccan	0	(0)
- * Club domestic league appearances and goals as of 21:30, 24 February 2023 (UTC)

Gurmukh Singh (born 1 January 1999), is an Indian professional footballer who plays as a defender for I-League club Sreenidi Deccan.

== Career statistics ==
=== Club ===
As of 24 February 2023

Club	Season	League			Cup		AFC		Total	
Club	Season	Division	Apps	Goals	Apps	Goals	Apps	Goals	Apps	Goals
Rajasthan United	2021	I-League 2nd Division	6	0	0	0	—		6	0
Rajasthan United	2021–22	I-League	16	0	0	0	—		16	0
Chennaiyin	2022–23	Indian Super League	10	0	2 (Note: Appearance(s) in Durand Cup)	0	—		12	0
Sreenidi Deccan	2023–24	I-League	0	0	0	0	—		0	0
Career total			32	0	2	0	0	0	34	0
