= Aryan Niraj Lamba =

Indian association football player

Aryan Lamba
Personal information
- Full name: Aryan Niraj Lamba
- Date of birth: 28 October 2002 (age 24)
- Place of birth: Gujarat, India
- Height: 1.85 m (6 ft 1 in)
- Position: Goalkeeper

Team information
- Current team: Sreenidi Deccan
- Number: 41

Youth career
- ATK

Senior career*
Years	Team	Apps	(Gls)
2020–2022	ATK Mohun Bagan	0	(0)
2021	→ Chennai City (loan)	2	(0)
2021–2022	→ Kerala United (loan)	1	(0)
2022–	Sreenidi Deccan	18	(0)
- * Club domestic league appearances and goals as of 18:33, 12 March 2023 (UTC)

Aryan Niraj Lamba (born 28 October 2002) is an Indian professional footballer who plays as a goalkeeper for I-League club Sreenidi Deccan.

== Club career ==
=== ATK Mohun Bagan ===
Born in Gujarat, Lamba was part of the youth team at Indian Super League club ATK. Prior to the 2020–21 season, Lamba was announced as part of the ATK Mohun Bagan first-team.

==== Chennai City (loan) ====
On 15 January 2021, Lamba joined I-League club Chennai City on loan for the 2020–21 season. That day, Lamba made his professional debut, starting in a 2–0 defeat against Real Kashmir.

== Career statistics ==
=== Club ===
As of 16 April 2023

Club	Season	League			Cup		AFC		Total	
Club	Season	Division	Apps	Goals	Apps	Goals	Apps	Goals	Apps	Goals
ATK Mohun Bagan	2020–21	Indian Super League	0	0	0	0	—		0	0
Chennai City (loan)	2020–21	I-League	2	0	0	0	—		2	0
Kerala United (loan)	2021	I-League 2nd Division	1	0	0	0	—		1	0
Sreenidi Deccan	2021–22	I-League	8	0	0	0	—		8	0
Sreenidi Deccan	2022–23	I-League	10	0	4 (Note: Appearance(s) in Super Cup)	0	—		14	0
Sreenidi Deccan	Sreenidi Deccan total		18	0	4	0	0	0	22	0
Career total			21	0	4	0	0	0	25	0
