= 2022–23 I-League =

15th season of the I-League

Hero I-League
- Season: 2022–23
- Dates: 12 November 2022 – 12 March 2023
- Champions: RoundGlass Punjab (1st title)
- Promoted: RoundGlass Punjab
- Relegated: Kenkre; Sudeva Delhi
- Matches: 132
- Goals: 360 (2.73 per match)
- Top goalscorer: Luka Majcen (16 goals)
- Best goalkeeper: Kiran Chemjong (11 clean sheets)
- Biggest home win: RoundGlass Punjab 8–0 Sudeva Delhi (26 February 2023)
- Biggest away win: Rajasthan United 0–5 Churchill Brothers (17 January 2023)
- Highest scoring: Mohammedan 6–4 Sreenidi Deccan (24 February 2023)
- Longest winning run: RoundGlass Punjab (7 games)
- Longest unbeaten run: RoundGlass Punjab (11 games)
- Longest winless run: Sudeva Delhi (12 games)
- Longest losing run: Sudeva Delhi (7 games)
- Highest attendance: 8,234; Gokulam Kerala 1–0 Mohammedan (12 November 2022)
- Lowest attendance: 15; Sudeva Delhi 1–2 Aizawl (16 January 2023)
- Total attendance: 240,006
- Average attendance: 1,818

The 2022–23 I-League (also known as the Hero I-League for sponsorship reasons) was the 16th season of I-League, first as the second tier of Indian football league system. It was played from 12 November 2022 to 12 March 2023.

After a 4–0 win against Rajasthan United on 4 March 2023, RoundGlass Punjab clinched their second league title and became the first ever club to be promoted to the Indian Super League while Kenkre and Sudeva Delhi were relegated to I-League 2.

== Changes from last season ==
=== Disbanded clubs ===
- Indian Arrows

=== Reinstated clubs ===
- Kenkre: After being relegated at the end of the 2021–22 I-League season, Kenkre was allowed to participate this season. The closure of the Indian Arrows project played a major part in their reinstatement. The conditions for their reinstatement were an agreement to take in several Arrows players and no travel subsidy for away matches.

=== Changes in format ===
Due to the COVID-19 pandemic, the tournament's format was shortened for the last two seasons. From this season, the traditional home and away games format in a double round-robin have returned. Each team will play two matches against every other team at home and away.

The table topper will be declared the league's winner at the end of the season, thereby achieving promotion to 2023–24 Indian Super League, while the two teams with the lowest points will be relegated to 2023–24 I-League 2, and will get a bye to the final round.

== Teams ==
12 teams participated in the 2022–23 season:

Locations of I-League clubs

=== Stadiums and locations ===
Due to a lack of AFC standard football stadiums available in Rajasthan, Rajasthan United will play their home matches at Ambedkar Stadium, New Delhi. RoundGlass Punjab will play their home matches at Panchkula's Tau Devi Lal Stadium in Haryana. On 22 October 2022, AIFF chief Kalyan Chaubey inaugurated the new home ground of Sreenidi Deccan, the Deccan Arena.

| Team | Location | Stadium | Capacity |
|---|---|---|---|
| Aizawl | Aizawl, Mizoram | Rajiv Gandhi Stadium | 20,000 |
| Churchill Brothers | Panaji, Goa | GMC Athletic Stadium | 3,000 |
| Churchill Brothers | Vasco, Goa | Tilak Maidan | 5,000 |
| Gokulam Kerala | Calicut, Kerala | EMS Stadium | 50,000 |
| Gokulam Kerala | Manjeri, Kerala | Payyanad Stadium | 30,000 |
| Kenkre | Mumbai, Maharashtra | Cooperage Ground | 5,000 |
| Mohammedan | Kolkata, West Bengal | Kishore Bharati Krirangan | 12,000 |
| NEROCA | Imphal, Manipur | Khuman Lampak Main Stadium | 35,000 |
| RoundGlass Punjab | Mohali, Chandigarh | Tau Devi Lal Stadium | 12,000 |
| Rajasthan United | Jaipur, Rajasthan | Ambedkar Stadium (New Delhi) | 35,000 |
| Real Kashmir | Srinagar, Jammu and Kashmir | TRC Turf Ground | 11,000 |
| Sreenidi Deccan | Hyderabad, Telangana | Deccan Arena | 1,500 |
| Sudeva Delhi | New Delhi, Delhi | Chhatrasal Stadium | 16,000 |
| TRAU | Imphal, Manipur | Khuman Lampak Main Stadium | 35,000 |

=== Personnel and sponsorship ===
| Team | Head coach | Captain | Kit manufacturer | Shirt sponsor |
|---|---|---|---|---|
| Aizawl | (India) Caetano Pinho | (India) Lalchhawnkima | (Philippines) Vamos | NECS Limited |
| Churchill Brothers | (India) Mateus Costa | (Senegal) Momo Cissé | (India) Nivia | Churchill Brothers |
| Gokulam Kerala | (Spain) Francesc Bonet | (Cameroon) Aminou Bouba | (India) SEGA | CSB Bank |
| Kenkre | (India) Akhil Kothari | (India) Kiran Pandhare | (Denmark) Hummel | Kenkre Sports Foundation |
| Mohammedan | (India) Mehrajuddin Wadoo | (Trinidad and Tobago) Marcus Joseph | (India) Trak-only | BunkerHill Sports |
| NEROCA | (India) Khogen Singh | (Sierra Leone) David Simbo | (India) Ambition Sportswear | GOELD Frozen Foods |
| Rajasthan United | (India) Pushpender Kundu | (Kyrgyzstan) Aidar Mambetaliev | (India) Omtex Sports | |
| Real Kashmir | (England) Gifton Noel-Williams | (India) Subhasish Roy Chowdhury | (India) Nivia | Hotel CH2 Srinagar |
| RoundGlass Punjab | (Greece) Staikos Vergetis | (Serbia) Aleksandar Ignjatović | (India) T10 Sports | RoundGlass Sports |
| Sreenidi Deccan | (Portugal) Carlos Vaz Pinto | (Colombia) David Castañeda | (India) Nivia | Sreenidhi Sports Academy |
| Sudeva Delhi | (India) Sankarlal Chakraborty | (India) Priyant Singh | (India) Shiv-Naresh | Liquid Life |
| TRAU | (India) Nandakumar Singh | (Saint Kitts and Nevis) Gerard Williams | (India) SIX5SIX | HVS |

=== Managerial changes ===
| Team | Outgoing manager | Manner of departure | Date of vacancy | Round | Table | Incoming manager | Date of appointment | Ref. |
|---|---|---|---|---|---|---|---|---|
| Rajasthan United | (Spain) Francesc Bonet | End of contract | 1 June 2022 | Pre-season | | (India) Pushpender Kundu | 1 July 2022 | |
| Gokulam Kerala | (Italy) Vincenzo Annese | End of contract | 1 June 2022 | Pre-season | | (Cameroon) Richard Towa | 5 July 2022 | |
| Sreenidi Deccan | (Spain) Fernando Varela | End of contract | 13 June 2022 | Pre-season | | (Portugal) Carlos Vaz Pinto | 3 August 2022 | |
| RoundGlass Punjab | (Netherlands) Ed Engelkes | End of interim period | 1 June 2022 | Pre-season | | (Greece) Staikos Vergetis | 8 August 2022 | |
| Aizawl | (India) Yan Law | End of contract | 13 August 2022 | Pre-season | | (India) Henry Rozario | 24 August 2022 | |
| Sudeva Delhi | (India) Mehrajuddin Wadoo | End of interim period | 31 August 2022 | Pre-season | | (Japan) Atsushi Nakamura | 1 September 2022 | |
| Real Kashmir | (Scotland) David Robertson | End of contract | 31 August 2022 | Pre-season | | (India) Mehrajuddin Wadoo | 7 November 2022 | |
| Churchill Brothers | (Spain) Antonio Rueda | Sacked | 2 December 2022 | 5 | 11th | (Spain) Fernando Varela | 1 January 2023 | |
| Sudeva Delhi | (Japan) Atsushi Nakamura | Sacked | 5 December 2022 | 5 | 12th | (India) Sankarlal Chakraborty | 13 December 2022 | |
| Aizawl | (India) Henry Rozario | Personal reasons | 7 December 2022 | 6 | 8th | (India) Caetano Pinho | 9 December 2022 | |
| Mohammedan | (Russia) Andrey Chernyshov | Sacked | 16 December 2022 | 8 | 9th | (Spain) Kibu Vicuña | 24 December 2022 | |
| Gokulam Kerala | (Cameroon) Richard Towa | Sacked | 26 December 2022 | 9 | 4th | (Spain) Francesc Bonet | 27 December 2022 | |
| Real Kashmir | (India) Mehrajuddin Wadoo | Sacked | 1 February 2023 | 14 | 7th | (England) Gifton Noel-Williams | 8 February 2023 | |
| Churchill Brothers | (Spain) Fernando Varela | Sacked | 1 February 2023 | 14 | 5th | (India) Mateus Costa | 1 February 2023 | |
| Mohammedan | (Spain) Kibu Vicuña | Sacked | 21 February 2023 | 17 | 9th | (India) Mehrajuddin Wadoo | 22 February 2023 | |

== Foreign players ==
AIFF allowed a maximum of six foreign players, including one from an AFC-affiliated country per team, but only four can be part of the matchday squad.

| Club | Player 1 | Player 2 | Player 3 | Player 4 | Player 5 | AFC player | Former player(s) |
|---|---|---|---|---|---|---|---|
| Aizawl | (Argentina) Matías Verón | (Belarus) Ivan Veras | (Japan) Akito Saito | (Nigeria) Emmanuel Makinde | (Uganda) Henry Kisekka | (Japan) Eisuke Mohri | |
| Churchill Brothers | (Ghana) Emmanuel Yaghr | (Senegal) Abdoulaye Sané | (Senegal) Momo Cissé | (Uruguay) Martín Cháves | | (Afghanistan) Sharif Mukhammad | (Ivory Coast) Kamo Bayi (Iran) Milad Pakparvar (Spain) Manu Cordero (Spain) Tana |
| Gokulam Kerala | (Brazil) Kaká | (Cameroon) Aminou Bouba | (Kyrgyzstan) Eldar Moldozhunusov | (Spain) Omar Ramos | (Spain) Sergio Mendigutxia | (Afghanistan) Farshad Noor | (Argentina) Juan Nellar (Cameroon) Auguste Somlaga (Cameroon) Dodi Ndo |
| Kenkre | (Cameroon) Auguste Somlaga | (Cameroon) Raphael Bidias Rim | (Nepal) Anjan Bista | (Nigeria) Francis Nwankwo | | (Uzbekistan) Samandar Ochilov | (Ivory Coast) Ben Ouattara |
| Mohammedan | (Kyrgyzstan) Mirlan Murzaev | (Nigeria) Abiola Dauda | (Senegal) Ousmane N'Diaye | (Serbia) Nikola Stojanović | (Trinidad and Tobago) Marcus Joseph | (Syria) Shaher Shaheen | (Tajikistan) Nuriddin Davronov |
| NEROCA | (Ghana) Michael Kporvi | (Ivory Coast) Kamo Bayi | (Jamaica) Jourdain Fletcher | (Sierra Leone) David Simbo | | (Uzbekistan) Mirjalol Kasimov | (Uzbekistan) Sardor Jakhonov |
| Rajasthan United | (Ivory Coast) Léonce Dodoz | (Kyrgyzstan) Aidar Mambetaliev | (Kyrgyzstan) Atai Dzhumashev | (Kyrgyzstan) Bektur Amangeldiev | | (Uzbekistan) Otabek Zokirov | (The Gambia) Nuha Marong (Lebanon) Youssef Atriss (Uruguay) Martín Cháves (Spain) Joseba Beitia |
| Real Kashmir | (Ghana) Ernest Boateng | (Ghana) Ibrahim Nurudeen | (Ghana) Richard Agyemang | (Ghana) Wadudu Yakubu | | (Tajikistan) Nuriddin Davronov | (Ghana) Issahak Seidu (Ghana) Lamine Moro (Tajikistan) Nozim Babadzhanov |
| RoundGlass Punjab | (Argentina) Juan Nellar | (Bhutan) Chencho Gyeltshen | (Serbia) Aleksandar Ignjatović | (Slovenia) Luka Majcen | (Spain) Juan Mera | (Nepal) Kiran Chemjong | (Bosnia and Herzegovina) Adnan Šećerović |
| Sreenidi Deccan | (Colombia) David Castañeda | (Republic of the Congo) Dua Stanislas Ankira | (Ghana) Mohamed Awal | (Nigeria) Ogana Louis | (Nigeria) Rilwan Hassan | (Afghanistan) Faysal Shayesteh | |
| Sudeva Delhi | (Argentina) Alexis Gómez | (Nigeria) Akeem Abioye | | | | (Tajikistan) Shavkati Khotam | (Ghana) Isaac Essel (Japan) Kosuke Yamazaki (Japan) Tetsuaki Misawa (Nigeria) Felix Chidi Odili (Nigeria) Francis Nwankwo (Trinidad and Tobago) Daneil Cyrus |
| TRAU | (Brazil) Fernandinho | (Brazil) Gerson Vieira | (Ghana) Godfred Yeboah | (Ghana) Nana Poku | (Saint Kitts and Nevis) Gerard Williams | (Tajikistan) Komron Tursunov | |

== League table ==
| Pos | Team | Pld | W | D | L | GF | GA | GD | Pts | Qualification |
|---|---|---|---|---|---|---|---|---|---|---|
| 1 | RoundGlass Punjab (C, P) | 22 | 16 | 4 | 2 | 45 | 16 | +29 | 52 | Champions, Promotion to 2023–24 Indian Super League |
| 2 | Sreenidi Deccan | 22 | 13 | 3 | 6 | 44 | 29 | +15 | 42 | |
| 3 | Gokulam Kerala | 22 | 12 | 3 | 7 | 26 | 14 | +12 | 39 | |
| 4 | TRAU | 22 | 11 | 2 | 9 | 34 | 34 | 0 | 35 | |
| 5 | Real Kashmir | 22 | 9 | 7 | 6 | 27 | 25 | +2 | 34 | |
| 6 | Churchill Brothers | 22 | 9 | 6 | 7 | 34 | 24 | +10 | 33 | |
| 7 | Aizawl | 22 | 6 | 8 | 8 | 27 | 29 | −2 | 26 (Note: Head-to-head points: Aizawl 4, Mohammedan 1.) | |
| 8 | Mohammedan | 22 | 7 | 5 | 10 | 34 | 35 | −1 | 26 | |
| 9 | Rajasthan United | 22 | 7 | 4 | 11 | 19 | 32 | −13 | 25 (Note: Head-to-head points: Rajasthan United 6, NEROCA 0.) | |
| 10 | NEROCA | 22 | 7 | 4 | 11 | 22 | 26 | −4 | 25 | |
| 11 | Kenkre (R) | 22 | 3 | 8 | 11 | 23 | 40 | −17 | 17 | Relegation to 2023–24 I-League 2 |
| 12 | Sudeva Delhi (R) | 22 | 3 | 4 | 15 | 25 | 56 | −31 | 13 | Relegation to 2023–24 I-League 2 |

Source: I-League
Rules for classification: 1) points; 2) head-to-head points; 3) head-to-head goal difference; 4) goal difference; 5) number of goals scored; 6) drawing of lots
(C) Champions; (P) Promoted; (R) Relegated

=== Fixtures and results ===
| Home \ Away | RGP | SRD | GOK | TRU | REK | CHB | MOH | AIZ | NER | RAJ | KEN | SUD |
|---|---|---|---|---|---|---|---|---|---|---|---|---|
| RoundGlass Punjab | — | 2–1 | 1–0 | 2–0 | 2–0 | 3–1 | 1–0 | 2–1 | 3–1 | 1–1 | 3–0 | 8–0 |
| Sreenidi Deccan | 4–0 | — | 1–0 | 1–0 | 2–2 | 3–0 | 4–3 | 3–3 | 3–2 | 2–0 | 1–0 | 3–1 |
| Gokulam Kerala | 1–2 | 1–0 | — | 1–2 | 2–0 | 1–0 | 1–0 | 3–0 | 0–0 | 1–0 | 1–0 | 3–0 |
| TRAU | 2–0 | 1–2 | 1–0 | — | 0–2 | 3–2 | 0–0 | 3–1 | 2–1 | 3–1 | 3–0 | 2–0 |
| Real Kashmir | 0–1 | 2–1 | 0–0 | 3–2 | — | 0–3 (Note: Initially, Real Kashmir won 1–0, but the scoreline was overturned by the AIFF after Churchill Brothers filed a protest due to an illegal substitution made by Real Kashmir.) | 3–2 | 2–1 | 2–2 | 2–0 | 1–1 | 4–2 |
| Churchill Brothers | 0–0 | 2–3 | 0–1 | 6–1 | 0–0 | — | 2–1 | 1–1 | 0–0 | 1–2 | 3–2 | 1–0 |
| Mohammedan | 0–4 | 6–4 | 2–1 | 1–0 | 1–0 | 1–2 | — | 2–2 | 3–1 | 0–1 | 2–2 | 5–2 |
| Aizawl | 0–1 | 1–1 | 0–1 | 1–1 | 0–0 | 1–1 | 1–0 | — | 1–0 | 2–1 | 4–0 | 2–1 |
| NEROCA | 0–1 | 0–1 | 2–1 | 3–1 | 0–1 | 0–1 | 2–0 | 2–1 | — | 0–1 | 1–0 | 1–0 |
| Rajasthan United | 0–4 | 1–0 | 1–2 | 1–2 | 0–1 | 0–5 | 1–1 | 1–0 | 1–0 | — | 1–1 | 2–3 |
| Kenkre | 3–3 | 2–1 | 1–1 | 2–4 | 2–1 | 1–1 | 0–3 | 2–2 | 0–1 | 0–0 | — | 1–3 |
| Sudeva Delhi | 1–1 | 0–3 | 1–4 | 4–1 | 1–1 | 0–2 | 1–1 | 1–2 | 3–3 | 1–3 | 0–3 | — |

Source: I-League
Legend: Blue = home team win; Yellow = draw; Red = away team win.

=== Positions by round ===
The table lists the positions of teams after each round mentioned in official fixtures.

| Round | 1 | 2 | 3 | 4 | 5 | 6 | 7 | 8 | 9 | 10 | 11 | 12 | 13 | 14 | 15 | 16 | 17 | 18 | 19 | 20 | 21 | 22 |
|---|---|---|---|---|---|---|---|---|---|---|---|---|---|---|---|---|---|---|---|---|---|---|
| Aizawl | 6 | 4 | 6 | 9 | 8 | 6 | 7 | 6 | 8 | 7 | 7 | 7 | 4 | 6 | 6 | 6 | 6 | 7 | 7 | 8 | 7 | 7 |
| Churchill Brothers | 9 | 10 | 11 | 11 | 11 | 11 | 8 | 9 | 7 | 8 | 8 | 8 | 8 | 5 | 4 | 5 | 5 | 5 | 4 | 6 | 6 | 6 |
| Gokulam Kerala | 4 | 3 | 3 | 5 | 5 | 3 | 2 | 3 | 4 | 3 | 4 | 3 | 3 | 3 | 3 | 4 | 4 | 3 | 3 | 3 | 3 | 3 |
| Kenkre | 2 | 5 | 8 | 10 | 9 | 9 | 10 | 11 | 10 | 10 | 10 | 11 | 11 | 11 | 11 | 11 | 11 | 11 | 11 | 11 | 11 | 11 |
| Mohammedan | 12 | 11 | 9 | 6 | 6 | 8 | 9 | 8 | 9 | 9 | 9 | 9 | 9 | 9 | 9 | 10 | 9 | 9 | 8 | 9 | 10 | 8 |
| NEROCA | 11 | 7 | 10 | 7 | 7 | 10 | 11 | 10 | 11 | 11 | 11 | 10 | 10 | 10 | 10 | 8 | 8 | 8 | 10 | 10 | 8 | 9 |
| Rajasthan United | 3 | 8 | 7 | 4 | 4 | 4 | 5 | 7 | 5 | 6 | 6 | 6 | 7 | 8 | 8 | 9 | 10 | 10 | 9 | 7 | 9 | 10 |
| Real Kashmir | 5 | 1 | 1 | 1 | 1 | 1 | 1 | 1 | 3 | 4 | 5 | 5 | 5 | 7 | 7 | 7 | 7 | 6 | 5 | 5 | 5 | 5 |
| RoundGlass Punjab | 1 | 2 | 2 | 2 | 3 | 5 | 3 | 4 | 2 | 2 | 1 | 2 | 1 | 1 | 2 | 2 | 2 | 2 | 1 | 1 | 1 | 1 |
| Sreenidi Deccan | 10 | 6 | 4 | 3 | 2 | 2 | 4 | 2 | 1 | 1 | 2 | 1 | 2 | 2 | 1 | 1 | 1 | 1 | 2 | 2 | 2 | 2 |
| Sudeva Delhi | 8 | 12 | 12 | 12 | 12 | 12 | 12 | 12 | 12 | 12 | 12 | 12 | 12 | 12 | 12 | 12 | 12 | 12 | 12 | 12 | 12 | 12 |
| TRAU | 7 | 9 | 5 | 8 | 10 | 7 | 6 | 5 | 6 | 5 | 3 | 4 | 6 | 4 | 5 | 3 | 3 | 4 | 6 | 4 | 4 | 4 |

| Promotion to Indian Super League |
| Relegation to I-League 2 |

Source: I-League

=== Results by games ===
| Team ╲ Round | 1 | 2 | 3 | 4 | 5 | 6 | 7 | 8 | 9 | 10 | 11 | 12 | 13 | 14 | 15 | 16 | 17 | 18 | 19 | 20 | 21 | 22 |
|---|---|---|---|---|---|---|---|---|---|---|---|---|---|---|---|---|---|---|---|---|---|---|
| Aizawl | D | L | W | L | D | W | D | W | L | D | D | W | L | W | W | L | L | L | L | D | D | D |
| Churchill Brothers | L | L | D | W | D | W | W | D | W | L | D | W | D | W | L | W | L | L | W | L | D | W |
| Gokulam Kerala | W | W | D | L | D | W | W | D | L | W | L | W | W | L | L | L | W | W | W | L | W | W |
| Kenkre | W | L | D | L | D | D | D | L | W | L | L | L | W | L | D | L | L | D | L | D | L | D |
| Mohammedan | L | L | W | W | L | L | D | W | D | D | D | W | L | L | D | L | W | L | W | L | L | W |
| NEROCA | L | W | L | W | L | L | L | D | L | L | D | W | W | L | W | W | D | L | L | D | W | L |
| Rajasthan United | W | L | D | W | W | D | L | L | W | D | W | L | L | L | L | L | L | D | W | W | L | L |
| Real Kashmir | W | W | D | L | W | W | L | L | L | D | D | L | D | L | W | D | W | W | W | D | D | W |
| RoundGlass Punjab | W | W | D | W | L | W | D | W | W | W | L | W | W | D | D | W | W | W | W | W | W | W |
| Sreenidi Deccan | L | W | W | W | W | L | D | W | W | W | L | W | L | W | W | W | W | W | L | D | D | L |
| Sudeva Delhi | L | L | L | L | L | L | L | D | L | D | L | L | W | D | L | W | L | W | L | D | L | L |
| TRAU | D | W | L | L | L | W | W | W | L | W | W | L | W | D | L | W | W | L | L | W | W | L |

Updated to match(es) played on 12 March 2023. Source: I-League
W = Win; D = Draw; L = Lose

== Season statistics ==
=== Top scorers ===
As of 12 March 2023

| Rank | Player | Club | Goals |
|---|---|---|---|
| 1 | (Slovenia) Luka Majcen | RoundGlass Punjab | 16 |
| 2 | (Colombia) David Castañeda | Sreenidi Deccan | 15 |
| 3 | (Spain) Juan Mera | RoundGlass Punjab | 10 |
| 4 | (Jamaica) Jourdain Fletcher | NEROCA | 9 |
| 4 | (Nigeria) Abiola Dauda | Mohammedan | 9 |
| 6 | (Tajikistan) Komron Tursunov | TRAU | 8 |
| 6 | (Argentina) Alexis Gómez | Sudeva Delhi | 8 |
| 6 | (Spain) Sergio Mendigutxia | Gokulam Kerala | 8 |
| 9 | (Trinidad and Tobago) Marcus Joseph | Mohammedan | 7 |
| 9 | (Senegal) Abdoulaye Sané | Churchill Brothers | 7 |

==== Top Indian scorers ====
The table includes only the list of top Indian goalscorers with more than 3 goals in this season.

| Rank | Player | Club | Goals |
|---|---|---|---|
| 1 | Seilenthang Lotjem | Sudeva Delhi | 6 |
| 1 | Samuel Kynshi | Real Kashmir | 6 |
| 3 | Salam Johnson Singh | TRAU | 5 |
| 4 | Aman Gaikwad | Kenkre | 4 |
| 4 | Anil Gaonkar | Churchill Brothers | 4 |
| 4 | Tharpuia | Aizawl | 4 |

==== Hat-tricks ====
| Player | For | Against | Result | Date | Ref |
|---|---|---|---|---|---|
| (Colombia) David Castañeda | Sreenidi Deccan | Sudeva Delhi | 3–0 (A) | 14 December 2022 | |
| (Spain) Juan Mera | RoundGlass Punjab | Sudeva Delhi | 8–0 (H) | 26 February 2023 | |
| (Argentina) Alexis Gómez | Sudeva Delhi | NEROCA | 3–3 (H) | 1 March 2023 | |
| (Nigeria) Abiola Dauda | Mohammedan | Sudeva Delhi | 5–2 (H) | 11 March 2023 | |

=== Top assists ===
As of 12 March 2023

| Rank | Player | Club | Assists |
|---|---|---|---|
| 1 | (Tajikistan) Komron Tursunov | TRAU | 7 |
| 1 | (Colombia) David Castañeda | Sreenidi Deccan | 7 |
| 1 | (Afghanistan) Faysal Shayesteh | Sreenidi Deccan | 7 |
| 4 | (Uruguay) Martín Cháves | Rajasthan United; Churchill Brothers | 6 |
| 4 | (India) Ramhlunchhunga | Sreenidi Deccan | 6 |
| 4 | (India) Noufal PN | Gokulam Kerala | 6 |

=== Clean sheets ===
As of 12 March 2023

| Rank | Player | Club | Clean sheets | Matches played |
|---|---|---|---|---|
| 1 | (India) Shibinraj Kunniyil | Gokulam Kerala | 11 | 19 |
| 1 | (Nepal) Kiran Chemjong | RoundGlass Punjab | 11 | 21 |
| 3 | (India) Albino Gomes | Churchill Brothers | 7 | 17 |
| 4 | (India) Ubaid CK | Sreenidi Deccan | 6 | 12 |
| 4 | (India) Subhasish Roy Chowdhury | Real Kashmir | 6 | 17 |

=== Discipline ===
==== Player ====
- Most yellow cards: 9
  - (India) Melroy Assisi
  - (Uzbekistan) Mirjalol Kasimov
- Most red cards: 1
  - 27 players

==== Club ====
- Most yellow cards: 47
  - Real Kashmir
- Most red cards: 5
  - Churchill Brothers

== Attendances ==
=== Overall statistical table ===
| Pos | Team | Total | High | Low | Average | Change |
|---|---|---|---|---|---|---|
| 1 | NEROCA | 37,403 | 7,580 | 1,239 | 3,400 | −74.2% |
| 2 | Real Kashmir | 31,444 | 4,123 | 538 | 2,859 | −67.1% |
| 3 | Gokulam Kerala | 28,139 | 8,234 | 1,216 | 2,558 | −86.6% |
| 4 | Aizawl | 25,661 | 7,657 | 1,100 | 2,333 | −55.2% |
| 5 | TRAU | 23,705 | 6,876 | 1,000 | 2,155 | −83.7% |
| 6 | Churchill Brothers | 19,926 | 3,475 | 1,100 | 1,811 | −40.9% |
| 7 | Mohammedan | 17,491 | 2,876 | 630 | 1,590 | n/a^{†} |
| 8 | Rajasthan United | 15,063 | 4,875 | 300 | 1,369 | n/a^{†} |
| 9 | RoundGlass Punjab | 14,815 | 6,327 | 200 | 1,347 | −65.9% |
| 10 | Kenkre | 11,711 | 2,758 | 238 | 1,065 | n/a^{†} |
| 11 | Sudeva Delhi | 8,924 | 3,506 | 15 | 811 | n/a^{†} |
| 12 | Sreenidi Deccan | 5,724 | 1,637 | 86 | 520 | n/a^{†} |
| | League total | 240,006 | 8,234 | 15 | 1,818 | −86.1% |

Source: I-League
Notes:
^{†} Teams that joined I-League during the pandemic.

=== Attendances by home match played ===
| Team \ Match played | 1 | 2 | 3 | 4 | 5 | 6 | 7 | 8 | 9 | 10 | 11 | Total |
|---|---|---|---|---|---|---|---|---|---|---|---|---|
| Aizawl | 7,657 | 3,174 | 1,730 | 1,300 | 1,300 | 2,000 | 1,100 | 1,245 | 2,210 | 1,500 | 2,445 | 25,661 |
| Churchill Brothers | 1,832 | 1,725 | 1,200 | 3,256 | 3,475 | 1,186 | 1,236 | 1,931 | 1,872 | 1,100 | 1,113 | 19,926 |
| Gokulam Kerala | 8,234 | 2,150 | 3,600 | 1,320 | 2,315 | 1,550 | 2,864 | 2,352 | 1,285 | 1,216 | 1,253 | 28,139 |
| Kenkre | 2,500 | 1,812 | 2,758 | 840 | 640 | 620 | 853 | 460 | 540 | 450 | 238 | 11,711 |
| Mohammedan | 630 | 2,346 | 1,126 | 1,850 | 1,208 | 2,876 | 1,756 | 2,126 | 1,000 | 1,356 | 1,217 | 17,491 |
| NEROCA | 7,580 | 5,724 | 3,125 | 2,125 | 2,176 | 1,350 | 2,874 | 3,700 | 4,328 | 3,182 | 1,239 | 37,403 |
| Rajasthan United | 4,875 | 3,025 | 1,356 | 600 | 300 | 1,123 | 1,129 | 1,212 | 407 | 500 | 536 | 15,063 |
| Real Kashmir | 4,000 | 3,500 | 4,123 | 4,038 | 3,950 | 3,446 | 2,236 | 2,100 | 2,513 | 538 | 1,000 | 31,444 |
| RoundGlass Punjab | 1,321 | 1,420 | 1,137 | 850 | 200 | 1,100 | 1,100 | 300 | 500 | 560 | 6,327 | 14,815 |
| Sreenidi Deccan | 1,637 | 1,013 | 300 | 750 | 164 | 500 | 86 | 674 | 198 | 162 | 240 | 5,724 |
| Sudeva Delhi | 2,500 | 3,506 | 1,256 | 100 | 235 | 556 | 15 | 150 | 200 | 156 | 250 | 8,924 |
| TRAU | 2,564 | 2,150 | 6,876 | 1,727 | 1,235 | 1,000 | 2,876 | 1,024 | 1,100 | 1,845 | 1,308 | 23,705 |

Legend: Highest Lowest
Source: I-League

== Broadcasting ==
The 2022–23 I-League season aired on India's DD Sports and Eurosport HD television channels. It was also available on the Discovery+ mobile app. However, after the start of the league, the broadcast was fraught with problems.

== Awards ==
=== Hero of the match ===
| Match No. | Hero of the Match | | Match No. | Hero of the Match | | Match No. | Hero of the Match | |
| Match No. | Player | Club | Match No. | Player | Club | Match No. | Player | Club |
|---|---|---|---|---|---|---|---|---|
| Match 1 | (Cameroon) Auguste Somlaga | Gokulam Kerala | Match 2 | (Ghana) Issahak Seidu | Real Kashmir | Match 3 | (India) Azfar Noorani | Kenkre |
| Match 4 | (India) Samuel Lalmuanpuia | RoundGlass Punjab | Match 5 | (India) K Lalrinfela | Aizawl | Match 6 | (India) Britto PM | Rajasthan United |
| Match 7 | (Uganda) Henry Kisekka | Aizawl | Match 8 | (Jamaica) Jourdain Fletcher | NEROCA | Match 9 | (Ghana) Lamine Moro | Real Kashmir |
| Match 10 | (India) Songpu Singsit | Sreenidi Deccan | Match 11 | (Slovenia) Luka Majcen | RoundGlass Punjab | Match 12 | (India) Lalchhawnkima | Aizawl |
| Match 13 | (Saint Kitts and Nevis) Gerard Williams | TRAU | Match 14 | (India) Shibinraj Kunniyil | Gokulam Kerala | Match 15 | (India) Daniel Lalhlimpuia | RoundGlass Punjab |
| Match 16 | (Tajikistan) Nuriddin Davronov | Mohammedan | Match 17 | (Afghanistan) Faysal Shayesteh | Sreenidi Deccan | Match 18 | (India) Azfar Noorani | Kenkre |
| Match 19 | (Uruguay) Martín Cháves | Rajasthan United | Match 20 | (Afghanistan) Faysal Shayesteh | Sreenidi Deccan | Match 21 | (India) Vanlalzuidika | Mohammedan |
| Match 22 | (India) Samuel Kynshi | Real Kashmir | Match 23 | (India) Deepak Devrani | RoundGlass Punjab | Match 24 | (Jamaica) Jourdain Fletcher | NEROCA |
| Match 25 | (Ghana) Mohamed Awal | Sreenidi Deccan | Match 26 | (Ghana) Lamine Moro | Real Kashmir | Match 27 | (Uganda) Henry Kisekka | Aizawl |
| Match 28 | (Spain) Joseba Beitia | Rajasthan United | Match 29 (Note: Match was postponed to 5 February 2023.) | (India) Sujit Sadhu | Sudeva Delhi | Match 30 | (India) Lalhmangaihsanga | Kenkre |
| Match 31 | (Ghana) Ibrahim Nurudeen | Real Kashmir | Match 32 | (Spain) Tana | Churchill Brothers | Match 33 | (India) Aman Gaikwad | Kenkre |
| Match 34 | (India) Shijin Thadhayouse | Gokulam Kerala | Match 35 | (Japan) Akito Saito | Aizawl | Match 36 | (India) Buanthanglun Samte | TRAU |
| Match 37 | (Senegal) Abdoulaye Sané | Churchill Brothers | Match 38 | (Colombia) David Castañeda | Sreenidi Deccan | Match 39 | (Sierra Leone) David Simbo | NEROCA |
| Match 40 | (India) Brandon Vanlalremdika | RoundGlass Punjab | Match 41 | (India) Sreekuttan VS | Gokulam Kerala | Match 42 | (Trinidad and Tobago) Marcus Joseph | Mohammedan |
| Match 43 | (Colombia) David Castañeda | Sreenidi Deccan | Match 44 | (Tajikistan) Komron Tursunov | TRAU | Match 45 | (India) Lunminlen Haokip | NEROCA |
| Match 46 | (Serbia) Nikola Stojanović | Mohammedan | Match 47 | (India) Joseph Clemente | Churchill Brothers | Match 48 | (India) Lalchhanhima Sailo | Aizawl |
| Match 49 | (India) Anil Rama Gaonkar | Churchill Brothers | Match 50 | (Uruguay) Martín Cháves | Rajasthan United | Match 51 | (India) Ramhlunchhunga | Sreenidi Deccan |
| Match 52 | (Slovenia) Luka Majcen | RoundGlass Punjab | Match 53 | (Nigeria) Abiola Dauda | Mohammedan | Match 54 | (India) Aman Gaikwad | Kenkre |
| Match 55 | (India) Bishorjit Singh | TRAU | Match 56 | (India) Rafique Ali Sardar | Rajasthan United | Match 57 | (Afghanistan) Faysal Shayesteh | Sreenidi Deccan |
| Match 58 | (India) Brandon Vanlalremdika | RoundGlass Punjab | Match 59 | (Spain) Sergio Mendigutxia | Gokulam Kerala | Match 60 | (Ghana) Ibrahim Nurudeen | Real Kashmir |
| Match 61 | (Kyrgyzstan) Aidar Mambetaliev | Rajasthan United | Match 62 | (India) Samuel Kynshi | Real Kashmir | Match 63 | (India) Anil Rama Gaonkar | Churchill Brothers |
| Match 64 | (Uganda) Henry Kisekka | Aizawl | Match 65 | (Spain) Juan Mera | RoundGlass Punjab | Match 66 | (India) Manash Protim Gogoi | TRAU |
| Match 67 | (Uganda) Henry Kisekka | Aizawl | Match 68 | (Colombia) David Castañeda | Sreenidi Deccan | Match 69 | (Senegal) Abdoulaye Sané | Churchill Brothers |
| Match 70 | (Jamaica) Jourdain Fletcher | NEROCA | Match 71 | (India) Christy Davis | Mohammedan | Match 72 | (Spain) Omar Ramos | Gokulam Kerala |
| Match 73 | (Jamaica) Jourdain Fletcher | NEROCA | Match 74 | (Slovenia) Luka Majcen | RoundGlass Punjab | Match 75 | (India) Ahmed Faiz Khan | Kenkre |
| Match 76 | (India) Lamgoulen Hangshing | Churchill Brothers | Match 77 | (India) R Lalthanmawia | Aizawl | Match 78 | (India) Brandon Vanlalremdika | RoundGlass Punjab |
| Match 79 | (India) Salam Johnson Singh | TRAU | Match 80 | (India) Rosenberg Gabriel | Sreenidi Deccan | Match 81 | (Spain) Sergio Mendigutxia | Gokulam Kerala |
| Match 82 | (India) Anil Rama Gaonkar | Churchill Brothers | Match 83 (Note: Match was postponed to 21 February 2023.) | (India) Samuel Kynshi | Real Kashmir | Match 84 | (India) Ranjeet Pandre | Kenkre |
| Match 85 | (Tajikistan) Shavkati Khotam | Sudeva Delhi | Match 86 | (India) Sairuat Kima | Mohammedan | Match 87 | (Colombia) David Castañeda | Sreenidi Deccan |
| Match 88 | (Uzbekistan) Mirjalol Kasimov | NEROCA | Match 89 | (India) Asheer Akhtar | Sreenidi Deccan | Match 90 | (Senegal) Abdoulaye Sané | Churchill Brothers |
| Match 91 | (Ghana) Richard Agyemang | Real Kashmir | Match 92 | (Jamaica) Jourdain Fletcher | NEROCA | Match 93 | (Belarus) Ivan Veras | Aizawl |
| Match 94 | (Slovenia) Luka Majcen | RoundGlass Punjab | Match 95 | (Brazil) Fernandinho | TRAU | Match 96 | (India) Sweden Fernandes | NEROCA |
| Match 97 | (Colombia) David Castañeda | Sreenidi Deccan | Match 98 | (India) Kean Lewis | Mohammedan | Match 99 | (Nepal) Kiran Chemjong | RoundGlass Punjab |
| Match 100 | (India) Seilenthang Lotjem | Sudeva Delhi | Match 101 | (Spain) Sergio Mendigutxia | Gokulam Kerala | Match 102 | (India) Salam Johnson Singh | TRAU |
| Match 103 | (India) Samuel Kynshi | Real Kashmir | Match 104 | (India) Tenzin Samdup | Kenkre | Match 105 | (Nigeria) Ogana Louis | Sreenidi Deccan |
| Match 106 | (Afghanistan) Farshad Noor | Gokulam Kerala | Match 107 | (Nepal) Kiran Chemjong | RoundGlass Punjab | Match 108 | (India) R Lalbiakliana | Sudeva Delhi |
| Match 109 | (Uruguay) Martín Cháves | Churchill Brothers | Match 110 | (Uzbekistan) Otabek Zokirov | Rajasthan United | Match 111 | (India) Kean Lewis | Mohammedan |
| Match 112 | (India) Noufal PN | Gokulam Kerala | Match 113 | (Ghana) Richard Agyemang | Real Kashmir | Match 114 | (Spain) Juan Mera | RoundGlass Punjab |
| Match 115 | (Japan) Akito Saito | Aizawl | Match 116 | (India) Melroy Assisi | Rajasthan United | Match 117 | (Argentina) Alexis Gómez | Sudeva Delhi |
| Match 118 | (Spain) Juan Mera | RoundGlass Punjab | Match 119 | (India) Subhasish Roy Chowdhury | Real Kashmir | Match 120 | (India) Salam Johnson Singh | TRAU |
| Match 121 | (India) R Lalthanmawia | Aizawl | Match 122 | (Bhutan) Chencho Gyeltshen | RoundGlass Punjab | Match 123 | (India) Samuel Kynshi | Real Kashmir |
| Match 124 | (India) Sweden Fernandes | NEROCA | Match 125 | (Spain) Sergio Mendigutxia | Gokulam Kerala | Match 126 | (India) Baoringdao Bodo | TRAU |
| Match 127 | (Nigeria) Abiola Dauda | Mohammedan | Match 128 | (India) Kingslee Fernandes | Churchill Brothers | Match 129 | (India) Lovepreet Singh | Kenkre |
| Match 130 | (Ghana) Ernest Boateng | Real Kashmir | Match 131 | (India) Shibinraj Kunniyil | Gokulam Kerala | Match 132 | (Slovenia) Luka Majcen | RoundGlass Punjab |
Source: I-League

=== Annual awards ===
| Award | Winner |
|---|---|
| Hero of the League | (Slovenia) Luka Majcen (RoundGlass Punjab) |
| Golden Boot | (Slovenia) Luka Majcen (RoundGlass Punjab) |
| Golden Glove | (Nepal) Kiran Chemjong (RoundGlass Punjab) |
| Best Midfielder | (Spain) Juan Mera (RoundGlass Punjab) |
| Syed Abdul Rahim Award (Best Coach) | (Greece) Staikos Vergetis (RoundGlass Punjab) |
| Jarnail Singh Award (Best Defender) | (Cameroon) Aminou Bouba (Gokulam Kerala) |
| Emerging Player of the League | (India) Salam Johnson Singh (TRAU) |
| Fair Play Award | TRAU |
| Best Match Organisation | Mohammedan |
| Best Media Operations | Rajasthan United |
Source: I-League

== See also ==
- Indian club qualifiers for 2023–24 AFC competitions
- 2022–23 Indian Super League
- 2022 Durand Cup
- 2023 Indian Super Cup
- 2022–23 I-League 2
