= Ibrahim Sissoko (footballer, born 1991) =

Ivorian footballer

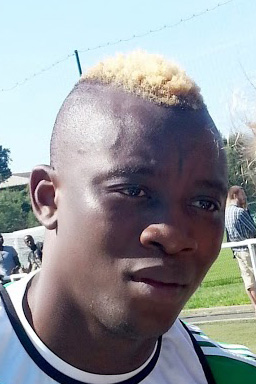
- Sissoko with Saint-Étienne

Personal information
- Date of birth: 29 November 1991 (age 34)
- Place of birth: Abidjan, Ivory Coast
- Height: 1.77 m (5 ft 10 in)
- Position: Winger

Youth career
- –2009: Athletic Adjamé
- 2009–2010: Académica

Senior career*
| Years | Team | Apps | (Gls) |
| 2010–2012 | Académica | 22 | (0) |
| 2012–2014 | VfL Wolfsburg | 2 | (0) |
| 2012–2013 | → Panathinaikos (loan) | 28 | (2) |
| 2013–2014 | → Saint-Étienne (loan) | 4 | (0) |
| 2013–2014 | → Saint-Étienne II (loan) | 3 | (0) |
| 2014 | → Deportivo La Coruña (loan) | 16 | (1) |
| 2014–2015 | Eskişehirspor | 26 | (1) |
| 2015–2016 | Konyaspor | 8 | (1) |
| 2017–2018 | Doxa Katokopias | 19 | (0) |
| 2018-2020 | Eskişehirspor | 30 | (5) |
| 2020–2021 | BB Erzurumspor | 29 | (3) |
| 2021 | Akhisarspor | 8 | (1) |
| 2023–2024 | Sreenidi Deccan | 25 | (e) |

International career
| 2011 | Ivory Coast U20 | 3 | (0) |
- * Club domestic league appearances and goals as of 20:29, 11 April 2022 (UTC)

Ibrahim Sissoko (born 29 November 1991) is an Ivorian professional footballer who plays as a winger. He represented the Ivory Coast U20s in the 2011 Toulon Tournament. He is the brother of former Malian player Mohamed Sissoko.

== Club career ==
=== VfL Wolfsburg ===
Sissoko joined German side VfL Wolfsburg from Académica de Coimbra of the Portuguese Primeira Liga in January 2012 for a transfer fee of €1.5 million, after Wolfsburg activated his release clause.

==== Loan to Panathinaikos ====
Sissoko was not considered a first team regular at Wolfsburg and in July 2012 he was loaned out to the Greek side Panathinaikos for a year in order to "gain some match practice at a top club", as Wolfsburg manager Felix Magath said.

==== Loan to Saint-Étienne ====
Sissoko joined French side Saint-Étienne in July 2013 for a year on loan.

=== Eskişehirspor ===
On 26 August 2014, Sissoko signed a three-year contract with Eskişehirspor.

=== Doxa Katokopias ===
On 7 June 2017, Doxa Katokopias announced the signing of Sissoko.

=== Sreenidi Deccan ===
In August 2023, Sissoko signed with I-League club Sreenidi Deccan.

Sreenidi Deccan parted ways with Sissoko on June 1st, 2024.

== Career statistics ==
As of 5 December 2024

Appearances and goals by club, season and competition
| Club | Season | League (Note: Includes appearances in the Primeira Liga, Bundesliga, Super League Greece, Ligue 1, Championnat de France amateur 2, Segunda División, Süper Lig, Cyta Championship, TFF 1. Lig and I-League) | | Cup (Note: Includes appearances in the Taça de Portugal, Greek Football Cup, Türkiye Kupası and Super Cup (India)) | | Continental (Note: Includes appearances in the UEFA Champions League and UEFA Europa League) | | Others (Note: Includes appearances in the Taça da Liga) | | Total | |
| Club | Season | Apps | Goals | Apps | Goals | Apps | Goals | Apps | Goals | Apps | Goals |
|---|---|---|---|---|---|---|---|---|---|---|---|
| Académica | 2010–11 | 9 | 0 | 2 | 0 | – | – | 1 | 0 | 12 | 0 |
| Académica | 2011–12 | 13 | 0 | 3 | 0 | – | – | 2 | 0 | 18 | 0 |
| Académica | Total | 22 | 0 | 5 | 0 | – | – | 3 | 0 | 30 | 0 |
| VfL Wolfsburg | 2011–12 | 2 | 0 | – | – | – | – | – | – | 2 | 0 |
| Panathinaikos (loan) | 2012–13 | 28 | 2 | 2 | 0 | 9 | 1 | – | – | 39 | 3 |
| Saint-Étienne (loan) | 2013–14 | 4 | 0 | – | – | 1 | 0 | – | – | 5 | 0 |
| Saint-Étienne II (loan) | 2013–14 | 3 | 0 | – | – | – | – | – | – | 3 | 0 |
| Deportivo La Coruña (loan) | 2013–14 | 16 | 1 | – | – | – | – | – | – | 16 | 1 |
| Eskişehirspor | 2014–15 | 15 | 0 | 1 | 0 | – | – | – | – | 16 | 0 |
| Konyaspor | 2015-16 | 8 | 1 | 1 | 0 | – | – | – | – | 9 | 1 |
| Doxa Katokopias FC | 2017-18 | 19 | 0 | – | – | – | – | – | – | 19 | 0 |
| Eskişehirspor | 2018-19 | 14 | 4 | – | – | – | – | – | – | 14 | 4 |
| Eskişehirspor | 2019-20 | 16 | 1 | – | – | – | – | – | – | 16 | 1 |
| Eskişehirspor | Total | 30 | 5 | – | – | – | – | – | – | 30 | 5 |
| BB Erzurumspor | 2019-20 | 16 | 2 | 2 | 1 | – | – | – | – | 18 | 3 |
| BB Erzurumspor | 2020-21 | 13 | 1 | 2 | 0 | – | – | – | – | 15 | 1 |
| BB Erzurumspor | Total | 29 | 3 | 4 | 1 | – | – | – | – | 33 | 4 |
| Akhisarspor | 2020-21 | 8 | 1 | – | – | – | – | – | – | 8 | 1 |
| Sreenidi Deccan FC | 2023-24 | 22 | 2 | 3 | 1 | – | – | – | – | 25 | 3 |
| Career total | | 206 | 15 | 11 | 2 | 10 | 1 | – | – | 227 | 18 |

== Honours ==
Académica de Coimbra

- Taça de Portugal: 2011–12
