= Arijit Bagui =

Indian footballer (born 1993)

Personal information
- Full name: Arijit Bagui
- Date of birth: August 29, 1993 (age 33)
- Place of birth: Dankuni, West Bengal, India
- Position: Right back

Team information
- Current team: Sreenidi Deccan
- Number: 24

Senior career*
Years	Team	Apps	(Gls)
2013–2016	Kalighat		
2016–2017	Peerless		
2017–2019	Mohun Bagan	29	(0)
2019–2020	Bhawanipore	4	(0)
2020–2021	Mohammedan	4	(0)
2021–2023	Sreenidi Deccan	27	(0)
2023–2024	Bhawanipore	4	(0)
2024–	Sreenidi Deccan	0	(0)
- * Club domestic league appearances and goals as of 12:43, 9 December 2023 (UTC)

Arijit Bagui (Bengali: অরিজিৎ বাগুই; born 29 August 1993) is an Indian professional footballer who plays as a defender for I-League club Sreenidi Deccan.

== Career ==
Arijit started his football career with Kalighat MS. He played for the club in 2013–14 Calcutta Premier Division. On 9 September 2013, he scored a goal against East Bengal in the 57 minute of their opening encounter of the 2013–14 season.

He played for them in 2014 I-League 2nd Division.

In 2016, he joined Peerless SC and played for them in the 2016 CFL Premier Division. He used to play as a winger, both left and right flank at Kalighat MS and was then converted into a right-back at Peerless.

=== Mohun Bagan ===
In July 2017, Mohun Bagan signed him for the 2017 CFL Premier Division and 2017–18 I-League. He won the Sikkim Governor's Gold Cup in October 2017 with the club.

==== 2017–2018 season ====
Sarthak Golui who was to be the first-choice right-back was loaned out to FC Pune City and suddenly Bagui was competing for a spot in the playing eleven with Gurjinder Kumar at the start of the I-League in November 2017.

It was no surprise that Sanjoy Sen decided to go with the more experienced of the two for the first game of the season. Kumar was at fault for the late equaliser Minerva Punjab scored to draw the match 1-1 and was dropped. In came Arijit Bagui in the lineup for the next game – the Kolkata derby against East Bengal. A 1–0 win followed and Sen seemed to have found his replacement for Pritam Kotal, who left for Delhi Dynamos.

He was stretchered off in the next game itself where he injured his ankle after a tackle by a Churchill Brothers player in an off-the-ball incident. During that three-week layoff, Mohun Bagan experienced one of their most tumultuous periods in recent history. Sen resigned following three draws and after suffering his first league home defeat in three years with the club were languishing in the sixth spot.

The Dankuni resident made his comeback coincidentally on the day Sankarlal Chakraborty took full-time charge - in a 2–0 win over Aizawl FC. After winning 21 points from 11 matches thereafter, Chakraborty kept Bagan in the title race till the last day of the league. They turned around the season to finish third, four points behind champions Minerva Punjab and Bagui played in each of the final eleven games.

==== 2018–19 season ====
He won the 2018–19 Calcutta Premier Division with the club. He made a total of 16 appearances for the club in the 2018–19 I-League.

==== 2019–20 season ====
On 25 May 2019 Mohun Bagan retained him along with seven other players for the 2019–20 season. On 22 July 2019 it was announced that The Best Footballer award for last season was conferred to Arijit Bagui for his excellent performance as a right back.

== Career statistics ==
=== Club ===
As of 9 December 2023

Club	Season	League			Cup		AFC		Total	
Club	Season	Division	Apps	Goals	Apps	Goals	Apps	Goals	Apps	Goals
Mohun Bagan	2017–18	I-League	13	0	3 (Note: Appearance(s) in Super Cup)	0	—		16	0
Mohun Bagan	2018–19	I-League	16	0	0	0	—		16	0
Mohun Bagan	2019–20	I-League	0	0	1 (Note: Appearance(s) in Durand Cup)	0	—		1	0
Mohun Bagan	Total		29	0	4	0	0	0	33	0
Bhawanipore	2020	I-League 2nd Division	4	0	0	0	—		4	0
Mohammedan	2020–21	I-League	4	0	0	0	—		4	0
Sreenidi Deccan	2021–22	I-League	7	0	0	0	—		7	0
Sreenidi Deccan	2022–23	I-League	20	0	4	0	—		24	0
Sreenidi Deccan	Total		27	0	4	0	0	0	31	0
Bhawanipore	2023–24	I-League 3	4	0	0	0	—		4	0
Sreenidi Deccan	2023–24	I-League	0	0	0	0	—		0	0
Career total			68	0	8	0	0	0	76	0

== Honours ==
=== Club ===
Mohun Bagan

- Calcutta Football League: 2018–19
