= William Alves (footballer, born 1991) =

Brazilian footballer

Personal information
- Full name: William Alves de Oliveira
- Date of birth: 7 December 1991 (age 34)
- Place of birth: Juiz de Fora, Brazil
- Height: 1.82 m (6 ft 0 in)
- Position: Forward

Team information
- Current team: Sreenidi Deccan
- Number: 7

Youth career
- 2009: Friburguense
- 2010: Botafogo

Senior career*
Years	Team	Apps	(Gls)
2010–2012	Botafogo	11	(0)
2013	Trenčín	32	(9)
2014–2015	Žilina	70	(17)
2016	Kayserispor	8	(0)
2016–2019	Chaves	84	(20)
2019–2020	Al-Faisaly	30	(3)
2020–2021	Al-Fayha	15	(3)
2021	Chaves	4	(0)
2021–2022	Coritiba	19	(1)
2023	Ferroviário	1	(0)
2023–	Sreenidi Deccan	44	(12)
- * Club domestic league appearances and goals as of 10:31, 5 April 2025 (UTC)

William Alves de Oliveira (born 7 December 1991) is a Brazilian professional footballer who plays as a forward for I-League club Sreenidi Deccan.

== Career ==
=== Botafogo ===
William Alves started off career in known Brazilian club Botafogo. He made his debut for Botafogo in Copa Sudamericana match against Colombian Independiente Santa Fe. In this match William netted the equalizing goal. The match ended in a 1–1 draw.

=== AS Trenčín ===
William Alves came to AS Trenčín in winter 2012–13 and signed a three-and-a-half-year contract. He made his debut for AS Trenčín in a friendly match against Czech SFC Opava on 26 January 2013. On 2 March 2013, he made his competitive debut for Trenčín in the league game against Spartak Myjava, when he came on in 77th minute. In winter 2013–14, he left the club due to a disagreement between AS Trenčín and Botafogo.

=== MŠK Žilina ===
William Alves signed a three-year contract with fellow Corgoň liga club MŠK Žilina in January 2014. On 1 March, he scored a goal on his competitive debut for Žilina in a 2–1 league loss to his former club AS Trenčín. On 6 August 2015, he scored a 120th-minute goal against FC Vorskla that allowed Žilina to reach the play-off rounds of Europa League. Two weeks later, William scored a brace against Athletic Bilbao in the first leg of the Europa League play-off round, which Žilina won 3–2 after having been 2–0 down.

=== Kayserispor ===
In January 2016, William Alves was transferred to Turkish club Kayserispor.
