= Songpu Singsit =

Indian footballer

Personal information
- Date of birth: 2 June 1999 (age 27)
- Place of birth: Kangpokpi Bazar, Manipur
- Height: 1.75 m (5 ft 9 in)
- Position: Winger

Team information
- Current team: Rajasthan United

Youth career
- 2017–2020: Muvanlai Athletics

Senior career*
Years	Team	Apps	(Gls)
2020–2021	NEROCA	14	(3)
2021–2022	East Bengal	2	(0)
2022–2024	Sreenidi Deccan	11	(2)
2024–	Rajasthan United	0	(0)
- * Club domestic league appearances and goals as of 21:33, 23 December 2023 (UTC)

Songpu Singsit (born 2 June 1999) is an Indian professional footballer who plays as a winger for Rajasthan United in the I-League.

== Career ==
Singsit began his professional career with NEROCA in the I-League and made his debut against Aizawl on 30 January 2020. Singsit scored three goals in his debut season in the I-League and was voted as the Fans' Emerging player of the season.

=== East Bengal ===
On 7 September 2021, Songpu Singsit joined Indian Super League club East Bengal on a one-year deal.

== Career statistics ==
=== Club ===
As of 14 January 2024

Club	Season	League			Cup		AFC		Total	
Club	Season	Division	Apps	Goals	Apps	Goals	Apps	Goals	Apps	Goals
NEROCA	2020–21	I-League	14	3	0	0	—		14	3
East Bengal	2021–22	Indian Super League	2	0	0	0	—		2	0
Sreenidi Deccan	2022–23	I-League	9	2	0	0	—		9	2
Sreenidi Deccan	2023–24	I-League	2	0	1 (Note: Appearance(s) in Super Cup)	0	—		3	0
Sreenidi Deccan	Total		11	2	1	0	0	0	12	2
Rajasthan United	2024–25	I-League	0	0	0	0	—		0	0
Career total			27	5	1	0	0	0	28	5
