= Carlos Vaz Pinto =

Portuguese football manager

Personal information
- Full name: Carlos Manuel Vaz Pinto
- Date of birth: 22 August 1974 (age 52)
- Place of birth: Portugal

Team information
- Current team: Inter kashi

Managerial career
- Years: Team
- 2007–2008: Académica (U15)
- 2008–2010: Académica (U19)
- 2010–2012: Sertanense
- 2012–2014: Recreativo da Caála
- 2016-2017: Académica do Lobito
- 2017-2018: Libolo
- 2017–2018: St. George
- 2019–2021: Famalicão (U23)
- 2021-2022: Gor Mahia
- 2022–2024: Sreenidi Deccan
- 2024–2026: Mafra
- 2026–: Inter kashi

Carlos Manuel Vaz Pinto (born 22 August 1974) is a Portuguese football manager who is the currently the head coach of the Indian Super League club Inter Kashi.

== Career ==
Vaz Pinto started his managerial career with Angolan side Recreativo da Caála, helping them reach the 2012 Angola Cup final, their only major final. In 2017, he was appointed manager of St. George in Ethiopia, helping them win the 2017 Ethiopian Super Cup. In 2021, Vaz Pinto was appointed manager of Kenyan club Gor Mahia, helping them win the 2021 FKF President's Cup, but left due to family reasons.

In 2022, he was appointed manager of Sreenidi Deccan in India. After achieving success in 2022–23 league season, he guided the team earning qualification in 2023 Indian Super Cup. In the group stage opener on 8 April, the club drew 1–1 with Bengaluru. His team later achieved a 2–0 victory over Kerala Blasters. But their journey ended after a 1–0 defeat to RoundGlass Punjab in last group stage match.

== Managerial statistics ==
As of 23 October 2024

Managerial record by team and tenure
Team	Nat	From	To	Record					Ref
Team	Nat	From	To	G	W	D	L	Win %	Ref
Sertanense	(Portugal)	1 July 2010	10 October 2011	1	0	0	1	0.00	
Caála	(Angola)	1 July 2012	16 May 2014	0	0	0	0	—	
C.R.D. Libolo	(Angola)	30 December 2016	13 September 2017	10	3	4	3	30.00	
St. George	(Ethiopia)	14 September 2017	27 October 2018	4	1	1	2	25.00	
Gor Mahia	(Kenya)	10 January 2021	10 July 2021	2	0	1	1	0.00	
Sreenidi Deccan	(India)	1 July 2022	30 June 2024	53	30	10	13	56.60	
Mafra	(Portugal)	1 July 2024	24 October 2024	10	2	3	5	20.00	
Total				80	36	19	25	45.00	—
