= Deccan Arena =

Association football stadium in Hyderabad

- Interactive map of Deccan Arena
- Location: Hyderabad, Telangana, India
- Coordinates: 17.3308°N 78.3355°E
- Owner: Sreenidi Deccan
- Operator: Sreenidi Deccan
- Capacity: 1,500
- Surface: Artificial turf

Tenant
- Sreenidi Deccan FC

Deccan Arena is a football stadium located in Hyderabad, Telangana. The stadium is home to the Indian Football League club Sreenidi Deccan.

On 22 October 2022, Sreenidi Deccan played their first match in the stadium where they managed to win the game by 1–0 against TRAU.

== See also ==
- List of football stadiums in India
