= Stanislas Dua Ankira =

Congolese footballer (born 1994)

Dua Stanislas Ankira
Personal information
- Full name: Dua Stanislas Ankira Ntsonakoulou
- Date of birth: 4 December 1994 (age 31)
- Place of birth: Brazzaville, Congo
- Height: 1.83 m (6 ft 0 in)
- Position: Defensive midfielder

Senior career*
Years	Team	Apps	(Gls)
2013–2015	Diables Noirs		
2015–2018	AC Léopards		
2018–2020	CARA Brazzaville		
2020–2021	Difaâ El Jadida	19	(0)
2023	Sreenidi Deccan	8	(0)

International career^{‡}
2014–2017	Congo	9	(0)
- * Club domestic league appearances and goals as of 19:33, 12 March 2023 (UTC) ‡ National team caps and goals as of 19 August 2017

Dua Stanislas Ankira Ntsonakoulou (born 4 December 1994) is a Congolese professional footballer who plays as a defensive midfielder. He represented Congo at international level.

== Club career ==
On 5 January 2023, Dua Ankira moved to India and signed with I-League side Sreenidi Deccan on a season-long deal. He was part of the team that moved to the main round of 2023 Indian Super Cup. They later drew 1–1 with Super League club Bengaluru and defeated Kerala Blasters by 2–0.

== International career ==
In January 2014, coach Claude Leroy, invited him to be a part of the Congo squad for the 2014 African Nations Championship. The team was eliminated in the group stages after losing to Ghana, drawing with Libya and defeating Ethiopia.
