= Lalromawia =

Indian footballer

Personal information
- Date of birth: 15 June 1998 (age 28)
- Place of birth: Aizawl, Mizoram, India
- Height: 1.65 m (5 ft 5 in)
- Position: Winger

Team information
- Current team: Sreenidi Deccan
- Number: 21

Youth career
- Chanmari West

Senior career*
Years	Team	Apps	(Gls)
2018–2019	Chhinga Veng	15	(4)
2019–2021	Gokulam Kerala	20	(1)
2021–	Sreenidi Deccan	75	(13)
- * Club domestic league appearances and goals as of 21:33, 25 March 2026 (UTC)

Lalromawia (born 15 June 1998) is an Indian professional footballer who plays as a forward for Indian Football League club Sreenidi Deccan.

== Career ==
Hailing from a small village named Samlukhai in Mizoram, Lalromawia comes from a very humble background. His father is a farmer by profession. He has two other siblings who help their father in farming. Lalromawia made his professional debut in the 2017–18 Mizoram Premier League for Chanmari West FC. His club finished seventh among eight clubs that season. Lalromawia had netted twice in that year.

In the 2017–18 Santosh Trophy, Lalromawia scored 4 goals for Mizoram football team and was one of the best player of the tournament. Lalromawia played for Chhinga Veng F.C. in 2018–19 season. He scored 4 goals from 15 appearances and had few assists to his name in the 2018–19 I-League 2nd Division. Chhinga Veng were the runner-ups of I-League 2nd Division and Mizoram Premier League (MPL).

In the 2019–20 season, he signed for Gokulam Kerala F.C. He made his professional debut for the Gokulam Kerala against Aizawl F.C. on 30 November 2019, He came on in as substitute in the 75th minute as Gokulam Kerala won 2–1.

== Career statistics ==
=== Club ===
As of 12 March 2023

Club	Season	League			Cup		AFC		Total	
Club	Season	Division	Apps	Goals	Apps	Goals	Apps	Goals	Apps	Goals
Chhinga Veng	2018–19	I-League 2nd Division	15	4	0	0	–		15	4
Gokulam Kerala	2019–20	I-League	11	0	2 (Note: Appearance(s) in Durand Cup)	0	–		13	0
Gokulam Kerala	2020–21	I-League	9	1	0	0	–		9	1
Sreenidi Deccan	2021–22	I-League	12	4	0	0	–		12	4
Sreenidi Deccan	2022–23	I-League	14	1	0	0	–		14	1
Career total			61	10	2	0	0	0	63	10

== Honours ==
=== Club ===
Gokulam Kerala

- Durand Cup : 2019
- I-League

(gold) Champions (1): 2020–21
