= Sreenidi Deccan FC =

Indian association football club based in Hyderabad

Sreenidi Deccan
- Full name: Sreenidi Deccan Football Club
- Nickname: The Deccan Warriors
- Short name: SDFC
- Founded: 1 January 2015; 11 years ago (as Sreenidhi FC)
- Ground: Deccan Arena
- Capacity: 1,500
- Owner: Sreenidhi Group
- Head coach: Antonio Rueda
- League: Indian Football League
- 2025–26: Indian Football League, 3rd of 10
- Website: sreenidideccanfc.com
Home colours	Away colours	Third colours

Sreenidi Deccan Football Club is an Indian professional football club based in Hyderabad, Telangana. It was established on 1 January 2015 as a football academy in Hyderabad, and later was launched from Visakhapatnam, Andhra Pradesh in 2021. The club is currently competing in the Indian Football League, the second tier of the Indian football league system.

On 5 June 2020, All India Football Federation (AIFF) issued an invitation to accept bids for new clubs to join the I-League and on 12 August, Sreenidi Deccan FC was granted playing rights directly in 2021–22 I-League.

== History ==
=== Formation and journey ===
Sreenidi football academy was founded in January 2015 in Aziznagar. It received the first accreditation from the AIFF in June 2019 and in its initial years the club played in the football leagues for the age groups of U13, U15 & U18. On 5 June 2020, the AIFF issued an invitation to accept bids for new clubs to join the league, and on 12 August Sreenidi Deccan were granted playing rights directly in 2021–22 I-League. Sreenidi Deccan Football Club was formally launched on 7 July 2021 in Visakhapatnam by state sports minister Muttamsetti Srinivasa Rao. In 2021, they participated in the IFA Shield and reached the final, losing to Real Kashmir by 2–1 and finished as runners-up.

The club began its league campaign on 27 December against NEROCA with a 3–2 defeat. In the next game, they defeated TRAU by 3–1 with a brace from Colombian striker David Castañeda, and later lost 3–1 to Mohammedan. After finishing fourth in group stage with six wins in twelve matches, they moved to the championship stage. At the end, the club finished their maiden league campaign in third place with 32 points in 18 matches, and won the last match against Churchill Brothers on 14 May. Later in November, the club participated in Baji Rout Cup in Odisha and reached semi-finals.

In August 2022, Portuguese manager Carlos Vaz Pinto was appointed head coach. The club retained their key players including Colombian striker David Castañeda Muñoz. In 2022–23 I-League season, Sreenidi Deccan achieved second position. After winning qualifying matches, they entered into the 2023 Indian Super Cup, and began their journey with a 1–1 draw with Bengaluru. The club later thrashed Kerala Blasters by 2–0. In the last group stage match against RoundGlass Punjab, Sreenidi lost 1–0 and failed to progress to the semi-finals.

On 29 October 2023, Sreenidi Deccan entered into a strategic partnership with Portuguese giant S.L. Benfica; primary focuses brought on strength and conditioning, nutrition and psychology, alongside youth developments in coming years. On that day, the club began their 2023–24 league season, defeating NEROCA 4–0. They ended their league campaign as runners-up, narrowly missing the opportunity to secure promotion to the Indian Super League. The 2024–25 league season was disastrous for the club, in which they finished in ninth place securing 28 points.

== Stadium ==
Sreenidi Deccan uses Deccan Arena as their home ground, which is located in Sreenidi Football Villa, Aziznagar, Hyderabad, and was inaugurated in November 2022.

The club when entered into I-League, proposed to use the DYSSR Stadium in Visakhapatnam for home matches, a multi-purpose stadium having capacity of 27,500. Due to COVID-19 pandemic in India, all league games were played in few centralized venues in West Bengal, and the club never used DYSSR Stadium.

== Crest, colours & kits ==
The primary club colours are orange and green. The primary colours, along with the secondary white colour can be seen on the crest as well as the jerseys. Club's kits were launched by the Visakhapatnam Port Trust chairman K Ramamohana Rao.

=== Kit manufacturers and shirt sponsors ===
Period	Kit manufacturer	Shirt sponsor	Back sponsor	Chest sponsor
2021–2022	Nivia	Sreenidhi Group	Sreenidhi Sports Academy	-
2022-2023	Nivia	Sreenidhi Group	Sreenidhi University	Sreenidhi Sports Academy
2023–2024	Vallion Sports	Sreenidhi Group	Sreenidhi University	Sreenidhi Sports Academy
2024–	Hummel	Sreenidhi Group & Apollo Hospitals	Sreenidhi University	Sreenidhi Sports Academy & Apollo Hospitals

== Players ==
=== First-team squad ===
As of September 2026

Note: Flags indicate national team as defined under FIFA eligibility rules; some limited exceptions apply. Players may hold more than one non-FIFA nationality.

No.	Pos.	Nation	Player
1	GK	IND	Kamaljit Singh
5	DF	IND	Arijit Bagui
6	MF	SEN	Pape Gassama
11	FW	COL	David Castañeda (captain)
15	DF	IND	Asraf Ali Mondal
16	MF	IND	Ajay Chhetri
17	FW	IND	Rosenberg Gabriel
18	DF	TOG	Hadi Idrissou
21	FW	IND	Lalromawia
23	DF	IND	Deepak DP
24	FW	IND	Lalchungnunga Chhangte
25	MF	IND	Emboklang Nongkhlaw
27	DF	IND	Abhishek Ambekar
30	MF	IND	Brandon Vanlalremdika

No.	Pos.	Nation	Player
33	DF	IND	Jagdeep Singh
41	GK	IND	Aryan Niraj Lamba
42	MF	IND	R Lawmnasangzuala
44	GK	IND	Adhil Faizal
55	DF	IND	Gurmukh Singh
—	FW	IND	Lalbiakdika Vanlalvunga (ON loan from NorthEast United)
—	FW	IND	Jerry Mawihmingthanga
—	FW	IND	Rochharzela
—	DF	IND	Pritam Kotal
—	MF	POR	Adriano Castanheira
—	MF	BRA	Vitinho

== Personnel ==
=== Current technical staff ===
As of February 2025

Role	Name	Refs.
Head coach	(Spain) Antonio Rueda	
Goalkeeping coach	(Portugal) Rafael Gracio	
Conditioning coach	(Mexico) Jorge Ovando Toledo	
Team manager	(India) Subhabrata Dey	
Performance analyst	(India) Alemso Tawsik	
Physiotherapist	(India) Prabhakaran Nataraj	
Reserve team coach	(India) Subam Rabha	

=== Management ===
Position	Name	Refs.
Chairman	(India) K. T. Mahhe	
Executive director	(India) Abhijit Rao Katikaneni	
Technical director	(Portugal) Fabio Nunes Ferreira	

== Records and statistics ==
=== Season by season ===
As of 5 December 2024

Season	League									Finals	Super Cup	Other competitions	Top scorer(s)	
Season	Division	Pld	W	D	L	GF	GA	Pts	Pos	Finals	Super Cup	Durand Cup	Player(s)	Goals
2021–22	I-League	18	9	5	4	27	19	32	3rd	—	—	—	(Colombia) David Castañeda	10
2022–23	I-League	22	13	3	6	44	29	42	2nd	—	GS	—	(Colombia) David Castañeda	17
2023-24	I-League	24	14	6	4	54	26	48	2nd	—	GS	—	(Colombia) David Castañeda (Brazil) William	11

=== Managers and statistics ===
As of 27 September 2024

Only competitive matches are taken into account.

Name	Nationality	From	To	P	W	D	L	GF	GA	Win%	Ref.
Fernando Varela	Spain	9 June 2021	31 May 2022	18	9	5	4	27	19	50.00	
Carlos Vaz Pinto	Portugal	3 August 2022	3 August 2024	26	15	4	7	51	33	57.69	
Domingo Oramas	Spain	3 August 2024	26 September 2024	0	0	0	0	0	0	—	
Rui Amorim	Portugal	26 September 2024	till date	0	0	0	0	0	0	—	

== Notable players ==
The following foreign players of Sreenidi Deccan have been capped at senior/youth international level. Years in brackets indicate their spells at the club.

- (Ghana) Mohamed Awal (2021–2023)
- (Afghanistan) Faysal Shayesteh (2022–)
- (Republic of the Congo) Stanislas Dua Ankira (2023)
- (Ivory Coast) Ibrahim Sissoko (2023–2024)
- (Panama) Ángel Orelien (2024–)
- (Netherlands) (Curaçao) Roly Bonevacia (2024–)

== Affiliated clubs ==
The following club is affiliated with Sreenidi Deccan FC:

- (Portugal) S.L. Benfica (2023–present)

== Honours ==
League

- I-League
  - Runners-up (2): 2022–23, 2023–24
  - Third place (1): 2021–22

Cup

- IFA Shield (Note: Fourth oldest football tournament, organized by the IFA (W.B.), and played between the local clubs of West Bengal and other invited ones.)
  - Runners-up (1): 2021
- All India Sambalpur Gold Cup
  - Champions (1): 2025

== Other department ==
=== Sreenidi Deccan youth and academy ===
Sreenidi Deccan have their youth men's football section that participates in various nationwide tournaments. Club's leading football academy is based in Hyderabad. Their U17 team took part in the inaugural 2022–23 U-17 Youth Cup in January 2023. Reserve team of the club also took part in prestigious Stafford Challenge Cup in Bangalore. Club's U21 team participated in the "south zone" qualifiers of 2023 Reliance Foundation Development League. In December 2023, club's academy gained an 'elite category' accreditation by the All India Football Federation.

Club's academy and international football school are based in Deccan Arena in Hyderabad, and grassroots development programme is headed by Portuguese manager Fabio Ferreira.

Honours

- TFA C-Division Championship
  - Champions (1): 2022
- Apollo Tyres Hotfut Youth League (U-14)
  - Champions (1): 2022

== See also ==
- List of football clubs in India
