= 2020–21 Churchill Brothers FC season =

Indian football club season

Churchill Brothers
2020–21 season
- owner: Valanka Alemao
- Head coach: Fernando Santiago Varela
- I-League: 2nd
- Top goalscorer: League: Luka Majcen (11 goals); All: Luka Majcen (11 goals)
- Average home league attendance: Closed Door
Home colours	Away colours

The 2020–21 season was the 33rd season of Churchill Brothers S.C. in existence and Twelfth season in the I-League.

== Team ==
=== First team squad ===
As of 16 January 2021

Note: Flags indicate national team as defined under FIFA eligibility rules; some limited exceptions apply. Players may hold more than one non-FIFA nationality.

No.	Pos.	Nation	Player
1	GK	IND	Shilton Paul
2	DF	LBN	Hamza Kheir
3	DF	IND	Mamit Vanlalduatsanga
4	DF	IND	Suresh Meitei
5	DF	IND	Vikas Saini
6	MF	IND	Quan Gomes
7	MF	IND	Clencio Pinto
8	MF	IND	Kingsley Fernandes
9	FW	SLO	Luka Majcen
10	MF	HON	Clayvin Zuniga
11	FW	IND	Vinil Poojary
13	MF	CIV	Bazie Armand (Captain)
14	MF	IND	Israil Gurung
15	FW	IND	H. A. Mohammedali
17	MF	IND	Shubert Pereira

No.	Pos.	Nation	Player
18	MF	IND	Bryce Miranda
19	FW	IND	Lamgoulen Hangshing
20	MF	IND	Lalengzama Vangchhia
21	DF	IND	Kamran Farooque
22	DF	IND	Wendell Savio Coelho
23	DF	IND	Keenan Almeida
25	FW	IND	Ginminthang Hangsing
33	MF	IND	Richard Costa
36	MF	IND	Fredsan Marshall
37	DF	IND	Jovel Martins
40	GK	IND	Nora Fernandes
42	GK	IND	Shibinraj Kunniyil
—	DF	IND	Samuel Shadap
—	MF	IND	Sourav Das
—	MF	IND	Joseph Clemente

== Technical staff ==
Position	Name
Head coach	(Spain) Fernando Santiago Varela
Assistant coach	(India) Mario Soares
Assistant coach	(India) Mateus Costa

== Competitions ==
Win Draw Loss

Competition	First match	Last match	Starting round	Record							
Competition	First match	Last match	Starting round	Pld	W	D	L	GF	GA	GD	Win %
I-League	10 January 2021	27 March 2021	Matchday 1	15	8	5	2	22	17	+5	53.33
Super Cup	2021	2021	Cancelled	0	0	0	0	0	0	+0	—
Total				15	8	5	2	22	17	+5	53.33

Last updated: 6 April 2021.
Source: Competitions

=== I-League ===
==== League table ====
Pos	Team	Pld	W	D	L	GF	GA	GD	Pts	Qualification or relegation
1	Churchill Brothers	10	6	4	0	15	6	+9	22	Promote to Championship Stage (Group A)
2	Punjab	10	5	3	2	12	7	+5	18	Promote to Championship Stage (Group A)
3	Real Kashmir	10	4	5	1	18	9	+9	17	Promote to Championship Stage (Group A)
4	Gokulam Kerala	10	5	1	4	20	14	+6	16	Promote to Championship Stage (Group A)
5	TRAU	10	4	4	2	17	13	+4	16	Promote to Championship Stage (Group A)

Source: I-League
Rules for classification: 1) points; 2) head-to-head points; 3) head-to-head goal difference; 4) goal difference; 5) number of goals scored; 6) drawing of lots

==== League Results by round ====
Round	1	2	3	4	5	6	7	8	9	10
Result	W	D	W	W	D	D	D	W	W	W
League Position	1	1	1	1	1	1	1	3	1	1

Updated to match(es) played on 02 March 2021. Source: Matchday
W = Win; D = Draw; L = Loss

=== League Matchdays ===
10 January 2021 1	Indian Arrows	2–5	Churchill Brothers	Kolkata
17:00 IST	Thlacheu 9'; Gurkirat Singh 22' (pen.)	Report	Luka Majcen 2', 75'; Clayvin Zuniga 35', 59', 69'	Stadium: Kalyani Stadium; Attendance: 0 Man of the Match: Clayvin Zuniga (Churchill Brothers)

14 January 2021 2	Mohammedan SC	0–0	Churchill Brothers	Kolkata
17:00 IST		Report		Stadium: Kalyani Stadium; Attendance: 0 Man of the Match: Bryce Miranda (Churchill Brothers)

19 January 2021 3	Punjab FC	0–1	Churchill Brothers	Kolkata
14:00 IST		Report	Clayvin Zuniga 85'	Stadium: Salt Lake Stadium; Attendance: 0 Man of the Match: Hamza Kheir (Churchill Brothers)

25 January 2021 4	Churchill Brothers	2–0	Sudeva Delhi FC	Kolkata
14:00 IST		Report	Luka Majcen 19'; Bryce Miranda 36'	Stadium: Mohun Bagan Ground; Attendance: 0 Man of the Match: Luka Majcen (Churchill Brothers)

29 January 2021 5	Churchill Brothers	1–1	TRAU FC	Kolkata
19:00 IST	Bidyashagar Singh 23'	Report	Clayvin Zuniga 19'	Stadium: Kalyani Stadium; Attendance: 0 Man of the Match: Bidyashagar Singh (Trau)

3 February 2021 6	Churchill Brothers	0–0	Aizawl F.C.	Kolkata
19:00 IST		Report		Stadium: Kalyani Stadium; Attendance: 0 Man of the Match: Lalmuansanga (Aizawl)

8 February 2021 7	Churchill Brothers	0–0	Real Kashmir	Kolkata
19:00 IST		Report		Stadium: Salt Lake Stadium; Attendance: 0 Man of the Match: Shilton Paul (Churchill Brothers)

18 February 2021 8	Chennai City	1–2	Churchill Brothers	Kolkata
19:00 IST	Elvedin Škrijelj 64'	Report	Luka Majcen 49', 90+4'	Stadium: Kalyani Stadium; Attendance: 0 Man of the Match: Luka Majcen (Churchill Brothers)

24 February 2021 9	Churchill Brothers	0–0	NEROCA	Kolkata
14:00 IST	Clayvin Zuniga 17'	Report		Stadium: Kishore Bharati Krirangan; Attendance: 0 Man of the Match: Clayvin Zuniga (Churchill Brothers)

1 March 2021 10	Churchill Brothers	3–2	Gokulam Kerala	Kolkata
19:00 IST	Luka Majcen 26', 87'; Kingsley Fernandes 53'	Report	Vincy Barretto (red card) 30'; Philip Adjah 80'; Jithin M S 90+2'	Stadium: Kishore Bharati Krirangan; Attendance: 0 Man of the Match: Luka Majcen (Churchill Brothers)

=== Championship Stage (Group A) ===
Pos	Team	Pld	W	D	L	GF	GA	GD	Pts	Qualification
1	Gokulam Kerala (C)	15	9	2	4	31	17	+14	29	Champions and Qualification for 2022 AFC Cup group stage
2	Churchill Brothers	15	8	5	2	22	17	+5	29	
3	TRAU	15	7	5	3	27	19	+8	26	
4	Punjab	15	6	4	5	18	15	+3	22	
5	Real Kashmir	15	5	6	4	23	18	+5	21	
6	Mohammedan	15	5	5	5	18	20	−2	20	

Updated to match(es) played on 27 March 2021. Source: I-League
Rules for classification: 1) points; 2) head-to-head points; 3) head-to-head goal difference; 4) goal difference; 5) number of goals scored; 6) drawing of lots
(C) Champions

5 March 2021 1	Real Kashmir	1–3	Churchill Brothers	kolkata
14:00 ist	Lukman Adefemi 68'	Report	Luka Majcen 45+1'; Fredsan Marshall 90+4'	Stadium: Salt Lake Stadium; Attendance: 0 Man of the Match: Suresh Meitei (Churchill Brothers)

10 March 2021 2	Churchill Brothers	0–3	Gokulam Kerala	kolkata
19:00 ist		Report	Mamit Vanlalduatsanga 45' (o.g.); Denny Antwi 56', 62'	Stadium: Kalyani Stadium; Attendance: 0 Man of the Match: Denny Antwi (Gokulam Kerala)

15 March 2021 3	Churchill Brothers	1–4	Mohammedan SC	kolkata
19:00 ist	Luka Majcen 21'	Report	Hira Mondal 15'; Vanlalbiaa Chhangte 63'; Pedro Manzi 86', 90+3'	Stadium: Kalyani Stadium; Attendance: 0 Man of the Match: Pedro Manzi (MDSC)

21 March 2021 4	TRAU FC	1–1	Churchill Brothers	kolkata
14:00 ist	K Phalguni Singh 43'	Report	Luka Majcen 28'	Stadium: Kishore Bharati Krirangan; Attendance: 0 Man of the Match: K Phalguni Singh (TRAU)

27 March 2021 5	Churchill Brothers	3–2	Punjab FC	kolkata
17:00 ist	Luka Majcen 8'; Clayvin Zuniga 25', 45+3'	Report	Joseba Beitia 65'; Baba Diawara 69'	Stadium: Salt Lake Stadium] Attendance: 0 Man of the Match: Clayvin Zuniga (Churchill Brothers)
