= 2021–22 Churchill Brothers FC season =

Indian football club season

Churchill Brothers
2021–22 season
- CEO: Valanka Alemao
- Head coach: Antonio Rueda
- I-League: 4th
- Top goalscorer: Kenneth Ikechukwu (10)
Home colours	Away colours

The 2021–22 season was the 34th season of Churchill Brothers in existence and thirteenth in the I-League. A new coach for the team, Antonio Rueda, was appointed on 19 February 2022.

== Transfers ==
In

Date	Pos.	Name	From	Fee	Ref.
29 June 2021	MF	(India) Varun Thokchom	(India) NEROCA	None	
26 July 2021	FW	(Guinea) Sekou Sylla	(Vietnam) Haiphong	None	
20 August 2021	DF	(Lebanon) Shadi Skaf	(Lebanon) Bourj	None	
21 August 2021	FW	(India) Afdal Varikkodan	(India)	None	
21 August 2021	FW	(India) Kapil Hoble	(India) FC Goa	None	
15 September 2021	MF	(Brazil) Guilherme Escuro	(Brazil) Retrô	None	
27 September 2021	FW	(India) Faheem Ali	(India) Kerala United FC	None	
28 September 2021	FW	(India) Aaron Barretto	(India) Salgaocar	None	
11 October 2021	FW	(Nigeria) Kenneth Ikechukwu	(Bangladesh) Saif SC	None	
29 January 2022	FW	(Tajikistan) Komron Tursunov	(India) Rajasthan United	None	

Out

Exit date	Pos.	Name	To	Fee	Ref.
16 June 2021	FW	(Honduras) Clayvin Zuniga	(El Salvador) FAS	None	
16 June 2021	FW	(Slovenia) Luka Majcen	(India) Bengaluru United	None	
16 June 2021	MF	(Ivory Coast) Bazie Armand	(Libya) Abu Salem	None	
16 June 2021	DF	(Lebanon) Hamza Kheir	(Lebanon) Ahed	None	
4 August 2021	DF	(India) Suresh Meitei	(India) Army Red	None	
4 July 2021	GK	(India) Shibinraj Kunniyil	(India) Sreenidi Deccan	None	
4 August 2021	MF	(India) Fredsan Marshall	(India) Sreenidi Deccan	None	
4 August 2021	MF	(India) Israil Gurung		None	
12 January 2022	DF	(Lebanon) Shadi Skaf	(Lebanon) Nejmeh	None	

== I-League ==
Date	Opponents	H / A	Result F–A	Scorers
26 December 2021	Gokulam Kerala	A	0–1	
4 March 2022	RoundGlass Punjab	A	2–2	Sylla 16', Ikechukwu 44'
8 March 2022	Sudeva Delhi	H	0–1	
12 March 2022	TRAU	A	0–2	
16 March 2022	Mohammedan	A	2–1	Ikechukwu 2', 62'
21 March 2022	Rajasthan United	A	0–2	
24 March 2022	Aizawl	H	2–1	Ikechukwu 44', Tursunov 45+3'
28 Match 2022	Sreenidi Deccan	A	1–1	Tursunov 62'
1 April 2022	NEROCA	A	4–2	Saurav Mandal 9', Tursunov 28', Ikechukwu 57' (pen.), Krizo 89'
6 April 2022	Real Kashmir	A	1–0	Fernandes 90'
10 April 2022	Kenkre	A	2–1	Tursunov 75', Ikechukwu 81'
18 April 2022	Indian Arrows	A	2–1	Tursunov 47', Momo Cisse 90+4'
26 April 2022	Rajasthan United	H	2–1	Tursunov 23', Akhand 45+2' (o.g.)
30 April 2022	Gokulam Kerala	H	1–1	Ikechukwu 15'
3 May 2022	RoundGlass Punjab	H	2–1	Miranda 25', Krizo 85'
6 May 2022	Mohammedan	A	0–2	
9 May 2022	NEROCA	A	3–1	Cisse 36', Ikechukwu 40', 76'
14 May 2022	Sreenidi Deccan	H	0–1	

== Current squad ==
=== First team squad ===
Note: Flags indicate national team as defined under FIFA eligibility rules; some limited exceptions apply. Players may hold more than one non-FIFA nationality.

No.	Pos.	Nation	Player
1	GK	IND	Shilton Paul (captain)
3	DF	IND	Mamit Vanlalduatsanga
4	DF	IND	Suresh Meitei
5	DF	IND	Vikas Singh Saini
6	MF	IND	Quan Gomes
7	MF	BRA	Guilherme Escuro
8	MF	IND	Kingsley Fernandes
10	FW	NGR	Kenneth Ikechukwu
11	FW	IND	Vinil Poojary
14	FW	IND	Kapil Hoble
15	FW	GUI	Sekou Sylla
17	MF	IND	Shubert Pereira
18	MF	IND	Bryce Miranda
19	FW	IND	Lamgoulen Hangshing

No.	Pos.	Nation	Player
22	DF	IND	Wendell Savio Coelho
23	DF	SEN	Momo Cisse
26	GK	IND	Debnath Mondal
27	FW	IND	Saurav Mandal
28	FW	IND	Aaron Barretto
29	MF	IND	Joseph Clemente
30	DF	IND	Asif Ali Molla
32	FW	IND	Afdal Varikkodan
33	MF	IND	Richard Costa
37	DF	IND	Jovel Martins
40	GK	IND	Nora Fernandes
47	FW	CIV	Gnohere Krizo
77	FW	TJK	Komron Tursunov
—	FW	IND	Faheem Ali

== Technical staff ==
Position	Name
Head coach	(Spain) Antonio Rueda
Assistant coach	(India) Mario Soares
Assistant coach	(India) Mateus Costa

== Squad statistics ==
Churchill Brothers used a total of 26 players during the 2021–22 season and there were seven different goalscorers. Lamgoulen Hangshing and Richard Costa played in all 18 matches with former starting in all of them, the latter in 14. Kenneth Ikechukwu was the highest scorer with ten goals.

Key

No. = Squad number

Pos. = Playing position

Apps = Appearances

GK = Goalkeeper

DF = Defender

MF = Midfielder

FW = Forward

= Yellow cards

= Red cards

Numbers in parentheses denote appearances as substitute. Players with name struck through and marked † left the club during the playing season.

No.	Pos.	Name				
No.	Pos.	Name	Apps	Goals	Yellow card	Red card
1	GK	(India) Shilton Paul	14	0	3	0
1	DF	(Lebanon) ~~Shadi Skaf~~ †	1	0	0	0
3	DF	(India) Mamit Vanlalduatsanga	0	0	0	0
4	DF	(India) Suresh Meitei	17	0	1	0
5	DF	(India) Vikas Singh Saini	4 (6)	0	1	0
6	MF	(India) Quan Gomes	8 (4)	0	2	0
7	MF	(Brazil) Guilherme Escuro	2	0	1	0
8	MF	(India) Kingsley Fernandes	17	1	4	0
10	FW	(Nigeria) Kenneth Ikechukwu	18	10	1	0
11	FW	(India) Vinil Poojary	1 (8)	0	1	0
14	MF	(India) Kapil Hoble	6 (2)	0	1	0
15	FW	(Guinea) Sekou Sylla	5 (3)	0	0	0
17	MF	(India) Shubert Pereira	2 (5)	0	0	0
18	MF	(India) Bryce Miranda	11 (6)	1	0	0
19	DF	(India) Lamgoulen Hangshing	18	0	2	0
20	DF	(India) Meldon D'Silva	3 (3)	0	1	0
22	DF	(India) Wendell Savio Coelho	0 (2)	0	1	0
23	DF	(Senegal) Momo Cisse	15	2	3	0
26	GK	(India) Debnath Mondal	1	0	0	0
27	FW	(India) Saurav Mandal	9 (5)	1	2	0
28	FW	(India) Aaron Barretto	0 (3)	0	0	0
29	MF	(India) Joseph Clemente	8 (1)	0	1	0
30	DF	(India) Asif Ali Molla	1 (1)	0	1	0
32	FW	(India) Afdal Varikkodan	0 (4)	0	1	0
33	MF	(India) Richard Costa	14 (4)	0	1	0
40	GK	(India) Nora Fernandes	3	0	0	0
47	FW	(Ivory Coast) Gnohere Krizo	4 (5)	2	4	0
77	FW	(Tajikistan) Komron Tursunov	16	6	3	0
—	GK	(India) Pratheesh Dinkan	0	0	0	0
