= 2023–24 Churchill Brothers FC season =

Indian football club season

Churchill Brothers
2023–24 season
- CEO: Valanka Alemao
- Head coach: Edgardo Malvestiti (until January 2024); Francesc Bonet (from January)
- Stadium: Tilak Maidan
- I-League: 7th
- Top goalscorer: League: Ogana Louis (7); All: Ogana Louis (7)
- Highest home attendance: 2,314 (v. Inter Kashi; 17 November 2023)
- Lowest home attendance: 200 (v. Shillong Lajong; 4 March 2024)
- Average home league attendance: 1,156
- Biggest win: 7–0 v. Rajasthan United
- Biggest defeat: 4–0 v. Aizawl
Home colours	Away colours

The 2023–24 season was the 36th season of Churchill Brothers in existence and fifteenth in the I-League. A new coach for the team, Edgardo Malvestiti, was appointed on 29 July 2023. The club has mutually parted ways with the head coach from Argentina after finding themselves in the bottom half of the I-League midway into the season. Francesc Bonet replaced him in January 2024.

Churchill Brothers played their opening game of the season on 31 October 2023 in a goalless draw against Namdhari at home. Their first win came in the next game, away against Real Kashmir on 8 November. They played their final match of the season on 10 April 2024, in a 7–0 win at home against Rajasthan United. They finished with 33 points, and seventh on the I-League table at the end of the season. After a poor first half, Churchill Brothers won six of their last nine matches.

== Personnel ==
=== Current technical staff ===
Position	Name
Head coach	(Spain) Francesc Bonet
Assistant coach	(India) Mario Soares
Fitness and conditioning coach	(Brazil) Djair Miranda Garcia
Goalkeeping coach	(India) Nikidesh Kalari Vattath
Head physiotherapist	(India) Anandu S Kumar

== Current squad ==
=== First-team squad ===
As of 3 September 2024

Note: Flags indicate national team as defined under FIFA eligibility rules; some limited exceptions apply. Players may hold more than one non-FIFA nationality.

No.	Pos.	Nation	Player
1	GK	IND	Subhasish Roy Chowdhury
2	DF	IND	Nishchal Chandan
5	DF	IND	Ponif Vaz
7	FW	IND	Stendly Fernandes
8	MF	IND	Rahul Raju
10	MF	URU	Martín Cháves
11	FW	IND	Faisal Ali
13	MF	IND	Lalawmpuia Sailo
15	DF	IND	Lalbiakhlua Ralte
17	DF	IND	Lalremruata
18	FW	IND	Trijoy Dias
19	DF	IND	Lamgoulen Hangshing (vice-captain)
20	FW	IND	Silvana R Lalruatkima (on loan from Chhinga Veng FC)
24	GK	IND	Bilal Khan
26	FW	IND	Lunminlen Haokip
27	DF	IND	Sebastian Thangmuansang

No.	Pos.	Nation	Player
32	MF	IND	Pushkar Sanjay Prabhu
33	MF	IND	Richard Costa (captain)
34	DF	CIV	Aubin Kouakou
40	MF	GHA	Kofi Essien
44	MF	IND	Jobern Cardozo
49	DF	IND	Lesly Rebello
57	FW	IND	Anil Rama Gaonkar
70	FW	SEN	Abdou Karim Samb
88	FW	NGA	Chika Ajulu
99	FW	NGA	Ogana Louis
—	DF	IND	Ajith Kumar
—	MF	IND	Gaurav K
—	GK	IND	Subhajit Bhattacharjee

== Transfers ==
=== In ===
Date	Position	Nationality	Player	From	Fee	Ref.
30 July 2023	GK	(India)	Subhasish Roy Chowdhury	(India) Real Kashmir	Free Transfer	
5 August 2023	GK	(India)	Bilal Khan	(India) Gokulam Kerala	Free Transfer	
11 August 2023	MF	(India)	Gourav K	(India) Kerala Blasters B	Free Transfer	
23 August 2023	CB	(India)	Nishchal Chandan	(India) Sudeva Delhi	Free Transfer	
3 September 2023	DF	(India)	Lalbiakhlua Ralte	(India) Chhinga Veng FC	Undisclosed Fee	
5 September 2023	DF	(Argentina)	Emiliano Callegari Torre	(Malta) Floriana	Free Transfer	
9 September 2023	FW	(India)	Stendly Fernandes	(India) Sporting Clube de Goa	Free Transfer	
5 October 2023	FW	(Argentina)	Ricardo Dichiara	(Argentina) Club Atlético Germinal	Free Transfer	
8 October 2023	FW	(India)	Faisal Ali	(India) Bengaluru	Free Transfer	
11 October 2023	MF	(India)	Rahul Raju	(India) Gokulam Kerala	Free Transfer	
16 October 2023	CB	(Iran)	Meysam Shahmakvand	(Bangladesh) Mohammedan SC	Free Transfer	
16 October 2023	RB	(India)	Sebastian Thangmuansang	(India) Odisha	Free Transfer	
27 October 2023	FW	(India)	Lunminlen Haokip	(India) NEROCA	Free Transfer	
28 October 2023	CB	(India)	Lesly Rebello	(India) Goa	Free Transfer	
3 November 2023	FW	(Nigeria)	Chikaorah Obiajulu	(Nigeria)	Free Transfer	
13 November 2023	FW	(Nigeria)	Ogana Louis	(India) Sreenidi Deccan	Free Transfer	
02 February 2024	FW	(Senegal)	Abdou Karim Samb	(India) Shillong Lajong	Free Transfer	
03 February 2024	RB	(India)	Ajith Kumar	(India) Chennaiyin	Free Transfer	
03 February 2024	DF	(Ivory Coast)	Aubin Kouakou	(Libya) Al-Nasr Benghazi	Free Transfer	
07 February 2024	MF	(Ghana)	Kofi Essien	(Ghana) Berekum Chelsea	Free Transfer	

=== Loans in ===
Date	Pos	Nationality	Player	Loaned from	Until	Ref
5 September 2023	FW	(India)	Silvana R Lalruatkima	(India) Chhinga Veng FC	31 May 2024	

=== Out ===
Date	Position	Nationality	Player	To	Fee	Ref.
1 April 2023	FW	(Uganda)	Emmanuel Yaghr	(Uzbekistan) Dinamo Samarqand	Free Transfer	
1 June 2023	DF	(India)	Akash Mukherjee	(India) Bhawanipore	Free Transfer	
1 July 2023	MF	(Afghanistan)	Sharif Mukhammad	—	Released	
1 July 2023	DF	(Senegal)	Momo Cissé	—	Released	
1 July 2023	FW	(Senegal)	Abdoulaye Sané	—	Released (Note: Joined Nîmes Olympique after release)	
7 July 2023	DF	(India)	Raju Gaikwad	(India) Delhi	Free Transfer	
15 July 2023	FW	(Liberia)	Ansumana Kromah	(India) Bodoland	Free Transfer	
20 July 2023	MF	(India)	Kingslee Fernandes	(India) Punjab	Free Transfer	
20 July 2023	FW	(India)	Afdal Varikkodan	—	Released	
22 July 2023	MF	(India)	Quan Gomes	—	Released	
22 July 2023	DF	(India)	Meldon D'Silva	—	Released	
22 July 2023	MF	(India)	Wendell Savio Coelho	—	Released	
25 July 2023	FW	(India)	Alocious Muthayyan	(India) United SC	Free Transfer	
29 July 2023	GK	(India)	Albino Gomes	(India) Sreenidi Deccan	Free Transfer	
30 August 2023	GK	(India)	Nora Fernandes	(India) Aizawl	Free Transfer	
30 August 2023	DF	(India)	Nongmeikapam Sanathoi Meitei		Free Agent	
30 August 2023	DF	(India)	George D'Souza		Free Agent	
30 August 2023	DF	(India)	Joseph Clemente		Free Agent	
30 August 2023	MF	(India)	Kapil Hoble		Free Agent	
30 August 2023	DF	(India)	Gautam Inacio Dias		Free Agent	
30 August 2023	FW	(India)	Lalkhawpuimawia		Free Agent	
30 August 2023	FW	(India)	Aaron Bareto		Free Agent	
30 August 2023	DF	(India)	Alent Colaco		Free Agent	
30 August 2023	DF	(India)	Vanlalduatsanga		Free Agent	
30 August 2023	MF	(India)	Shubert Pereira		Free Agent	
3 January 2024	FW	(Argentina)	Ricardo Dichiara	(Malta) Żabbar St. Patrick	Free Agent	
3 January 2024	DF	(Argentina)	Emiliano Callegari Torre		Free Agent	
3 January 2024	DF	(Iran)	Meysam Shahmakvand		Free Agent	
3 January 2024	FW	(India)	Chaitan Komarpant	(India) Geno FC	Free Agent	

== Competitions ==
=== Overview ===
Competition	First match	Last match	Final position	Record							
Competition	First match	Last match	Final position	Pld	W	D	L	GF	GA	GD	Win %
I League	31 October 2023	10 April 2024	7th	24	9	6	9	40	31	+9	37.50
Total				24	9	6	9	40	31	+9	37.50

Source: Competitions

=== I-League ===
==== League table ====
Pos	Team	Pld	W	D	L	GF	GA	GD	Pts
5	Real Kashmir	24	11	7	6	36	19	+17	40
6	Delhi	24	11	2	11	44	40	+4	35
7	Churchill Brothers	24	9	6	9	40	31	+9	33
8	Shillong Lajong	24	8	7	9	36	37	−1	31
9	Namdhari	24	7	6	11	29	40	−11	27

Source: I-League
Rules for classification: 1) Points; 2) Head-to-head points; 3) Head-to-head goal difference; 4) Total goal difference; 5) Total number of goals scored; 6) drawing of lots
(Note: Head-to-head record is used only after all the matches between the teams in question have been played).

==== Matches ====
Note: I-League announced the fixtures for the 2023–24 season on 6 October 2023.

31 October 2023 1	Namdhari	0–0	Churchill Brothers	Bhaini Sahib
14:00 IST		Report		Stadium: Namdhari Stadium; Attendance: 561; Referee: Dipu Roy; Man of the Match: Martín Cháves (Churchill Brothers)

8 November 2023 3	Real Kashmir	1–3	Churchill Brothers	Srinagar
14:00 IST	Ateeb Ahmed Dar 45'	Report	Carlos Lomba 26' (o.g.); Ricardo Dichiara 60', 62'	Stadium: TRC Turf Ground; Attendance: 4,728; Referee: Surojit Das; Man of the Match: Ricardo Dichiara (Churchill Brothers)

13 November 2023 4	Rajasthan United	2–0	Churchill Brothers	Hyderabad
19:00 IST	Lalchungnunga Chhangte 5'; Richard Gadze 38'	Report		Stadium: Deccan Arena; Attendance: 150; Referee: Ashish Tiwari; Man of the Match: Lalchungnunga Chhangte (Rajasthan United)

17 November 2023 5	Churchill Brothers	1–2	Inter Kashi	Vasco
19:00 IST	Ricardo Dichiara 38'	Report	Jackichand Singh 52'; Gyamar Nikum 87'	Stadium: Tilak Maidan; Attendance: 2,314; Referee: Lakshay; Man of the Match: Gyamar Nikum (Inter Kashi)

22 November 2023 6	Churchill Brothers	4–0	TRAU	Vasco
19:00 IST	Ricardo Dichiara 18'; Richard Costa 33'; Ogana Louis 70' (pen.); Emiliano Callegari 84'	Report		Stadium: Tilak Maidan; Attendance: 1,895; Referee: K. Lyngdoh Nongum; Man of the Match: Ricardo Dichiara (Churchill Brothers)

26 November 2023 7	Gokulam Kerala	1–1	Churchill Brothers	Kozhikode
19:00 IST	Sánchez 73' (pen.)	Report	Costa 38'	Stadium: EMS Stadium; Attendance: 13,425; Referee: Suresh Devaraj; Man of the Match: Emiliano Callegari (Churchill Brothers)

1 December 2023 8	Delhi	2–1	Churchill Brothers	Bhaini Sahib
14:00 IST	Sérgio Barboza 47'; Ponif Vaz 87' (o.g.)	Report	Martín Cháves 24'	Stadium: Namdhari Stadium; Attendance: 1,058; Referee: Jehrul Islam; Man of the Match: Pape Gassama (Delhi)

6 December 2023 9	Shillong Lajong	2–0	Churchill Brothers	Shillong
19:00 IST	Laiwang Bohham 45+1'; Renan Paulino 50' (pen.)	Report		Stadium: SSA Stadium; Attendance: 6,115; Referee: Anand Rana; Man of the Match: Renan Paulino (Shillong Lajong)

9 December 2023 10	Churchill Brothers	4–1	NEROCA	Vasco
19:00 IST	Faisal Ali 9', 15'; Fernandes 32'; Ricardo Dichiara 90+4'	Report	Ansumana Kromah 47'	Stadium: Tilak Maidan; Attendance: 2,000; Referee: Jatinder Singh; Man of the Match: Faisal Ali (Churchill Brothers)

17 December 2023 11	Churchill Brothers	0–0	Mohammedan	Vasco
19:00 IST		Report		Stadium: Tilak Maidan; Attendance: 1,683; Referee: Akashkumar Mehta; Man of the Match: Padam Chettri (Mohammedan)

4 February 2024 12	Churchill Brothers	1–2	Sreenidi Deccan	Vasco
16.30 IST	Abdou Karim Samb 88'	Report	David Castañeda 11'; Eli Sabiá 90+4'	Stadium: Tilak Maidan; Attendance: 500; Referee: Williams Joy Koshy; Man of the Match: Eli Sabiá (Sreenidi Deccan)

10 February 2024 13	Churchill Brothers	1–1	Namdhari	Vasco
19:00 IST	Martín Cháves 75'	Report	Akashdeep Singh 57'	Stadium: Tilak Maidan; Attendance: 1,633; Referee: K. Ramdasan; Man of the Match: Martín Cháves (Churchill Brothers)

14 February 2024 14	Inter Kashi	1–1	Churchill Brothers	Kalyani
19:00 IST	Muhammad Ajsal 56'	Report	Emmanuel Essien 52'	Stadium: Kalyani Stadium; Attendance: 259; Referee: K. Lyngdoh Nongum; Man of the Match: Muhammad Ajsal (Inter Kashi)

17 February 2024 15	Churchill Brothers	0–2	Real Kashmir	Vasco
19:00 IST			Gnohere Krizo 66'; Kamo Bayi 90+9'	Stadium: Tilak Maidan; Attendance: 825; Referee: Mithun Kumar Kundu; Man of the Match: Gnohere Krizo (Real Kashmir)

24 February 2024 16	Churchill Brothers	1–2	Gokulam Kerala	Vasco
19:00 IST	Ogana Louis 49'	Report	Álex Sánchez 9'; Abhijith Kurungodan 19'	Stadium: Tilak Maidan; Attendance: 1,025; Referee: Tanmoy Dhar; Man of the Match: Abhijith Kurungodan (Gokulam Kerala)

27 February 2024 17	Churchill Brothers	2–0	Delhi	Vasco
19:00 IST	Ogana Louis 12', 20' (pen.)			Stadium: Tilak Maidan; Attendance: 921; Referee: Arvind Sekhar; Man of the Match: Ogana Louis (Churchill Brothers)

4 March 2024 18	Churchill Brothers	2–1	Shillong Lajong	Vasco
19:00 IST	Fernandes 15'; Cháves 80'	Report	Phrangki Buam 42'	Stadium: Tilak Maidan; Attendance: 200; Referee: Williams Joy Koshy

8 March 2024 19	NEROCA	2–3	Churchill Brothers	Shillong
16.30 IST	Ansumana Kromah 8'; Aniket Panchal 45+3'	Report	Abdou Karim Samb 22', 75', 86'	Stadium: SSA Stadium; Attendance: 50; Referee: Mithun Kumar Kundu; Man of the Match: Abdou Karim Samb (Churchill Brothers)

12 March 2024 20	Mohammedan	3–2	Churchill Brothers	Kolkata
19:00 IST	Hernández 28', 33'; Fanai 75'	Report	Fernandes 10'; Cháves 51' (pen.)	Stadium: Naihati Stadium; Referee: Williams Joy Koshy; Man of the Match: Eddie Hernández (Mohammedan)

24 March 2024 21	Sreenidi Deccan	2–2	Churchill Brothers	Hyderabad
19:00 IST	Alves 4'; Lalromawia 39'	Report	Fernandes 83'; Semkholun 89'	Stadium: Deccan Arena; Attendance: 250; Referee: Aditya Purkayastha; Man of the Match: Stendly Fernandes (Churchill Brothers)

28 March 2023 2	Aizawl	4–0	Churchill Brothers	Aizawl
20:00 IST	Lalbiaknia 29', 88'; Lalthankhuma 73', 86'	Report		Stadium: Rajiv Gandhi Stadium; Attendance: 300; Referee: Jehrul Islam; Man of the Match: Lalrinzuala Lalbiaknia (Aizawl)

1 April 2024 22	TRAU	0–2	Churchill Brothers	Kalyani
19:00 IST		Report	Fernandes 1'; Sharma 45+2' (o.g.)	Stadium: Kalyani Stadium; Attendance: 500; Referee: Tanmoy Dhar; Man of the Match: Martín Cháves (Churchill Brothers)

5 April 2024 23	Churchill Brothers	2–0	Aizawl	Vasco
19:00 IST	Louis 7'; Lalmuanawma 90' (o.g.)	Report		Stadium: Tilak Maidan; Attendance: 275; Referee: Mrutyunjay L. Amatya; Man of the Match: Ogana Louis (Churchill Brothers)

10 April 2024 24	Churchill Brothers	7–0	Rajasthan United	Vasco
19:00 IST	Ogana Louis 17', 46'; Costa 26'; Semkholun 50'; Cháves 73'; Dias 88'; Samb 90+4'	Report		Stadium: Tilak Maidan; Attendance: 550; Referee: I. Jamal Mohamed; Man of the Match: Ogana Louis (Churchill Brothers)

== Statistics ==
=== Goalscorers ===
Rank	No.	Pos.	Nat.	Name	I League	Total
1	88	FW	(Nigeria)	Ogana Louis	7	7
2	7	FW	(India)	Stendly Fernandes	5	5
2	9	FW	(Argentina)	Ricardo Dichiara	5	5
2	10	MF	(Uruguay)	Martín Cháves	5	5
2	70	FW	(Senegal)	Abdou Karim Samb	5	5
6	33	MF	(India)	Richard Costa	3	3
7	11	FW	(India)	Faisal Ali	2	2
7	20	MF	(India)	Lamgoulan Semkholun	2	2
9	18	FW	(India)	Trijoy Dias	1	1
9	28	DF	(Argentina)	Emiliano Callegari	1	1
9	40	MF	(Ghana)	Emmanuel Essien	1	1
Own Goals					4	4
Total					41	41
