= 2022–23 Churchill Brothers FC season =

Indian football club season

Churchill Brothers
2022–23 season
- CEO: Valanka Alemao
- Head coach: Antonio Rueda
Home colours	Away colours

The 2022–23 season was the 35th season of Churchill Brothers in existence and Fourteenth in the I-League. A new coach for the team, Antonio Rueda, was appointed on 19 February 2022.

== Transfers ==
In

Date	Pos.	Name	From	Fee	Ref.
4 August 2022	FW	(India) Chaitan Komarpant	(India) Salgaocar	None	
11 August 2022	FW	(Senegal) Abdoulaye Sané	(Saudi Arabia) Al-Taawoun	None	
13 August 2022	MF	(Spain) Tana	(Maldives) Maziya	None	
31 August 2022	FW	(Iran) Milad Pakparvar	(Iran) Shams Azar	None	
14 August 2022	DF	(India) George D'Souza	(India) Odisha	None	
14 August 2022	FW	(Spain) Manu Cordero	(Spain) A. Dos Hermanas	None	
14 August 2022	DF	(Senegal) Momo Cissé		None	
14 August 2022	FW	(India) Lalkhawpuimawia	(India) NorthEast United	None	
10 October 2022	DF	(India) Raju Gaikwad	(India) East Bengal	None	
10 October 2022	FW	(Ivory Coast) Kamo Bayi	(India) Eastern Railway	None	
30 November 2022	MF	(Afghanistan) Sharif Mukhammad	(India) Gokulam Kerala	None	
3 January 2023	FW	(Uganda) Emmanuel Yaghr		None	

Out

Exit date	Pos.	Name	To	Fee	Ref.
15 June 2022	LW	(India) Bryce Miranda	(India) Kerala Blasters	Undisclosed Fee	
16 June 2022	GK	(India) Shilton Paul		None	
16 June 2022	AM	(Tajikistan) Komron Tursunov	(India) TRAU	None	
28 June 2022	LM	(India) Saurav Mandal	(India) Kerala Blasters	Undisclosed Fee	
1 July 2022	DF	(India) Suresh Meitei	(India) Army Red	None	
1 July 2022	DF	(India) Vikas Singh Saini	(India) Gokulam Kerala	None	
1 July 2022	MF	(Brazil) Guilherme Escuro	(Brazil) Juazeirense-BA	None	
27 July 2022	FW	(Nigeria) Kenneth Ikechukwu	(Saudi Arabia) Al-Nahda	None	
2 August 2022	AM	(India) Vinil Poojary	(India) Jamshedpur B	None	
30 November 2022	FW	(Iran) Milad Pakparvar		released	
3 January 2023	FW	(Ivory Coast) Kamo Bayi	(India) NEROCA	None	
15 January 2023	MF	(Spain) Tana		None	
15 January 2023	FW	(Spain) Manu Cordero		None	

== Pre-season ==
16 September 2022 Friendly
08.00 IST
Churchill Brothers FC Goa
- Milad Pakparvar

          * Mapuia 

* Aaron Bareto
3-0

SESA FA

Fatorda

22 September 2022 Friendly	Churchill Brothers FC Goa	1-0	Dempo	Navelim
08.00 IST	Joseph Clemente			Stadium: Rosary Ground

2 October 2022 Friendly	Churchill Brothers FC Goa	2-1	Rajasthan United	Navelim
08.00 IST	Momo Cisse; mapuia		Martin Chaves	Stadium: Rosary Ground

4 November 2022 Baji Rout Cup	Churchill Brothers FC Goa	1–1 (5–3 p)	Gokulam Kerala	Angul, Odisha
09.00 IST	Sané 90+2'	Report	A. Somlaga 90+4'	Stadium: Kadam Padia Stadium
	Penalties
	M. Cissé (penalty scored); Vaz (penalty scored); Costa (penalty scored); Tana (penalty scored); Sané (penalty scored)		Bouba (penalty scored); Noor (penalty scored); J. Nellar (penalty scored); Jasim (penalty missed)

6 November 2022 Baji Rout Cup	Churchill Brothers FC Goa	5–1	Mumbai Kenkre	Angul, Odisha
09.00 IST	Sané, Tana; Wendell; Kingslee Fernandes		Goal	Stadium: Kadam Padia Stadium

8 November 2022 Baji Rout Cup	Churchill Brothers FC Goa	2–2 (2–4 p)	Rajasthan United	Angul, Odisha
09.00 IST	Goal		*	Stadium: Kadam Padia Stadium

== Current squad ==
=== First-team squad ===
As of 1 November 2022

Note: Flags indicate national team as defined under FIFA eligibility rules; some limited exceptions apply. Players may hold more than one non-FIFA nationality.

No.	Pos.	Nation	Player
1	GK	IND	Nora Fernandes
3	DF	IND	George D'Souza
4	DF	IND	Joseph Clemente
5	DF	IND	Ponif Vaz
6	MF	IND	Quan Gomes
7	MF	IND	Wendell Savio Coelho
8	MF	IND	Kingslee Fernandes
9	FW	UGA	Emmanuel Yaghr
11	MF	IND	Shubert Pereira
12	MF	IND	Jobern Cardozo
15	MF	IND	Kapil Hoble
16	MF	IND	Jobern Cardozo
17	DF	IND	Meldon D'Silva
18	DF	IND	Gautam Inacio Dias
19	DF	IND	Lamgoulen Hangshing

No.	Pos.	Nation	Player
21	MF	AFG	Sharif Mukhammad
23	DF	SEN	Momo Cissé (Captain)
25	FW	IND	Chaitan Komarpant
26	FW	IND	Lalkhawpuimawia
27	FW	SEN	Abdoulaye Sané
28	FW	IND	Aaron Bareto
32	FW	IND	Afdal Varikkodan
33	MF	IND	Richard Costa
37	DF	IND	Vanlalduatsanga
44	MF	IND	Lalawmpuia Sailo
47	DF	IND	Raju Gaikwad
72	GK	IND	Albino Gomes
90	GK	IND	Subhajit Bhattacharjee
—	MF	IND	Pushkar Sanjay Prabhu

== Technical staff ==
Position	Name
Head coach	(India) Mateus Costa
Assistant coach	(India) Mario Soares

== Competitions ==
=== I-League ===
Pos	Team	Pld	W	D	L	GF	GA	GD	Pts
4	TRAU	22	11	2	9	34	34	0	35
5	Real Kashmir	22	9	7	6	27	25	+2	34
6	Churchill Brothers	22	9	6	7	34	24	+10	33
7	Aizawl	22	6	8	8	27	29	−2	26 (Note: Head-to-head points: Aizawl 4, Mohammedan 1.)
8	Mohammedan	22	7	5	10	34	35	−1	26

Source: I-League
Rules for classification: 1) points; 2) head-to-head points; 3) head-to-head goal difference; 4) goal difference; 5) number of goals scored; 6) drawing of lots

==== Matches ====
Date	Opponents	H / A	Result F–A	Scorers
15 November 2022	Rajasthan United	H	1–2	Sané 45+1'
20 November 2022	Sreenidi Deccan	H	2–3	Costa 69', Lalkhawpuimawia 75'
20 November 2022	Kenkre	A	1–1	Lalkhawpuimawia 84'
28 November 2022	Real Kashmir	A	0–1	
2 December 2022	Aizawl	H	1–1	
6 December 2022	Mohammedan	H	2–1	Raju Gaikwad 60', Tana 84'
10 December 2022	Sudeva Delhi	A	2–0	Abdoulaye Sané 54', Lamgoulen Hangshing 76'
16 December 2022	RoundGlass Punjab	H	0–0	
20 December 2022	TRAU	H	6–1	Sané 3', 33', Tana 35', Gaonkar 45+3', (OG) 89', Bayi 90+4'
8 January 2023	Gokulam Kerala	A	0–1	
12 January 2023	NEROCA	H	0–0	
17 January 2023	Rajasthan United	A	0–5	Yaghr 2, 54', Sané 29',90', Gaonkar 61'
24 January 2023	Real Kashmir	H	0–0	
30 January 2023	Sudeva Delhi	H	1–0	Gaonkar 83'
4 February 2023	Sreenidi Deccan	A	3–0	
7 February 2023	Mohammedan	A	1–2	Mukhammad 42', Sané 90+4'
10 February 2023	TRAU	A	3–2	(OG) 38', Hoble 66'
19 February 2023	Gokulam Kerala	H	0–1	
20 February 2023	Kenkre	H	3–2	Momo Cisse 7', Cháves 61', Yaghr 74'
1 March 2023	RoundGlass Punjab	A	3–1	Cháves 84'
4 March 2023	Aizawl	A	1–1	Goenkar 19'
11 March 2023	NEROCA	H	1–0	Momo Cisse 23'

=== Super Cup ===
Win Draw Loss

==== Qualifiers ====
6 April 2023 Q-4	Real Kashmir	0–6	Churchill Brothers	Manjeri, Kerala
20.30 IST		Report	Cháves 6'; Kromah 36', 45+1', 59', 61'; Jakhonov 75'	Stadium: Payyanad Stadium; Attendance: 1,708; Referee: Pranjal Banerjee; Man of the Match: Ansumana Kromah (Churchill Brothers)

==== Group Stage ====
Pos	Team	Pld	W	D	L	GF	GA	GD	Pts	Qualification	NEU	MCI	CHE	CHB
1	NorthEast United	3	2	0	1	10	8	+2	6 (Note: Head-to-head points: NorthEast United 3, Mumbai City 0.)	Advance to knockout stage	—	2–1	—	6–3
2	Mumbai City	3	2	0	1	4	3	+1	6		—	—	1–0	2–1
3	Chennaiyin	3	1	1	1	4	3	+1	4		4–2	—	—	—
4	Churchill Brothers	3	0	1	2	4	8	−4	1		—	—	0–0	—

Source: AIFF
Rules for classification: 1) points; 2) head-to-head points; 3) head-to-head goal difference; 4) goal difference; 5) number of goals scored; 6) drawing of lots

===== Matches =====
11 April 2023 1	Mumbai City	2–1	Churchill Brothers	Manjeri
17.00 IST	Mehtab 27'; Chhangte 90+3' (pen.)	Report	Kromah 9'; A. Gaonkar (yellow card) 26'; Hangshing (yellow card) 84'	Stadium: Payyanad Stadium; Attendance: 553; Referee: Senthil Nathan S Man of the Match: Rowllin Borges (Mumbai City)

15 April 2023 2	Churchill Brothers	0–0	Chennaiyin	Manjeri
17.00 IST	Costa (yellow card) 66' (yellow-red card) 85'; Hangshing (yellow card) 90+4'	Report	Das (yellow card) 29'; Vanspaul (yellow card) 71'	Stadium: Payyanad Stadium; Attendance: 2,225; Referee: Aditya Purkayastha; Man of the Match: Joseph Clemente (Churchill Brothers)

19 April 2023 3	NorthEast United	6–3	Churchill Brothers	Kozhikode
20:30 IST	Jordán 27', 43', 51', 70'; A. Kholmurodov (yellow card) 59'; Nigam 78'; Jithin 90+1'	Report	Fernandes 55'; Cháves 60' (yellow card) 71'; Irshad 83' (o.g.); D'Souza (yellow card) 86'	Stadium: EMS Stadium; Attendance: 828; Referee: Rahul Kumar Gupta; Man of the Match: Wilmar Jordán (NorthEast United)
