= Ahan Prakash =

Indian footballer (born 2004)

- Ahan with Mumbai City FC in 2026

Personal information
- Date of birth: 20 August 2004 (age 22)
- Place of birth: Bihar, India
- Position: Goalkeeper

Team information
- Current team: Mumbai City
- Number: 32

Youth career
- 2015–2020: Bengaluru

Senior career*
Years	Team	Apps	(Gls)
2020–2022	Indian Arrows	10	(0)
2023–	Mumbai City II	12	(0)
2023–	Mumbai City	0	(0)
- * Club domestic league appearances and goals as of 15:45, 24 June 2023 (UTC)

Ahan Prakash (born 20 August 2004) is an Indian footballer who plays as a goalkeeper for Indian Super League club Mumbai City.

== Early life ==
Born to a marketing couple and raised in a family with no significant sporting background, Ahan used to play cricket before being reportedly "forced" by his friends to give football a try.

In 2015, Ahan was selected by the Bengaluru Football Club for their Soccer School, playing both in the club's inter-school tournament and in the U-13 Youth League. In 2017 and 2018, he also represented Karnataka's State Team at the Sub-Junior National football tournament, captaining his side in the second edition.

== Club career ==
Following some promising performances at a youth level, Ahan joined developmental team Indian Arrows in 2020.

On 10 January 2021, he made his Ileague debut, against Churchill Brothers, in a 5–2 loss. He went on to collect seven more appearances in the I-League as his club finished second to last in the table, maturing significantly as a goalkeeper and leaving his mark in the league's history book.

On 14 February 2021, he became the youngest recipient of the Hero of the Match, in the history of I-League, earning a clean sheet in a 1–0 win against Mohammedan. Later, he became the youngest captain in the history of I-League, leading his team to a 3–0 victory against NEROCA, on 6 March 2021.

On 6 January 2023, Ahan signed for Mumbai City FC on a contract valid until May 2026.

== International career ==
After joining the national trial camp in Bhubaneswar in 2018, Ahan was selected on his second attempt, as he joined the Under-16 and Under-17 national football teams (under Coach Shuvendu Panda) for several different exposure tours, including the Future Champions Tournament in Johannesburg and a Tri-Nation Series in Dubai. During April and May 2019, he also represented India's Under-15 Team in the Torneo delle Nazioni in Italy.

== Career statistics ==
=== Club ===
As of 4 March 2022

Club	Season	League			Cup		AFC		Total	
Club	Season	Division	Apps	Goals	Apps	Goals	Apps	Goals	Apps	Goals
Indian Arrows	2020–21	I-League	8	0	0	0	–		8	0
Indian Arrows	2021–22	I-League	2	0	0	0	–		2	0
Indian Arrows	Indian Arrows total		10	0	0	0	0	0	10	0
Mumbai City	2022–23	Indian Super League	0	0	0	0	–		0	0
Career total			10	0	0	0	0	0	10	0
