= Mamit =

Mamit may refer to:

- Mamit Innuat, an indigenous people of Canada
- Mamit district, a district of Mizoram, India
  - Mamit, India, a town in the district
  - Mamit Assembly constituency, an assembly constituency in Mizoram
- Mamit Vanlalduatsanga, Indian professional footballer
