= Cajetan Fernandes =

Indian footballer

Personal information
- Date of birth: 28 February 1989 (age 37)
- Place of birth: Nuvem, Goa, India
- Height: 1.73 m (5 ft 8 in)
- Position: Midfielder

Team information
- Current team: Sporting Goa
- Number: 21

Senior career*
Years	Team	Apps	(Gls)
2011–2013	Salgaocar	5	(2)
2013–present	Sporting Goa	36	(2)
- * Club domestic league appearances and goals as of 30 May 2015

Cajetan Fernandes (born 28 February 1989) is an Indian footballer who plays for Sporting Clube de Goa as a midfielder in I-League.

== Career ==
=== Early career ===
Fernandes first hit the headlines when he scored India's solitary goal in a 1–6 loss to Portugal at the 2009 Lusophony Games.

Fernandes attended Mãe de Pobres High School in Nuvem and started his youth career with Fransa Pax before moving onto Salgaocar at the age of 17.

=== Salgaocar ===
Cajetan won the I-league title with Salgaocar in 2010-11 and was instrumental in Karim Bencherifa's young Indian midfield. His most memorable moment came after scoring & winning the Man of the Match award as Salgaocar came from 2 goals down to beat East Bengal on their way to winning the I-league title. Cajetan also scored an 88th-minute goal for Salgaocar in Delhi as they beat Indian Arrows 3–1 away from home.

=== Sporting Goa ===
Fernandes made his debut for Sporting Goa in the I-League on 21 September 2013 against Mumbai F.C. at the Balewadi Sports Complex; as Sporting Goa drew the match 1–1.

== Career statistics ==
=== Club ===
As of 30 May 2014

Club	Season	League			Cup			AFC			Total		
Club	Season	Apps	Goals	Assists	Apps	Goals	Assists	Apps	Goals	Assists	Apps	Goals	Assists
Salgaocar	2012–13	2	0	0	0	0	0	-	-	-	2	0	0
Sporting Goa	2013–14	19	2	0	0	0	0	-	-	-	19	2	0
Sporting Goa	2014–15	15	0	0	0	0	0	-	-	-	15	0	0
Career total		36	2	0	0	0	0	0	0	0	36	2	0

== Honours ==
=== Club ===
Salgaocar SC

- I-League (1): 2010–11
- Federation Cup (1) : 2011–12

Sporting Club de Goa

- Federation Cup (runners-up) : 2013–14
