= Nora Fernandes =

Indian footballer (born 1998)

Personal information
- Date of birth: 18 June 1998 (age 28)
- Place of birth: Goa, India
- Height: 1.84 m (6 ft 0 in)
- Position: Goalkeeper

Team information
- Current team: SC Delhi

Youth career
- 2017–2019: Salgaocar

Senior career*
Years	Team	Apps	(Gls)
2019–2020	Salgaocar	10	(0)
2020–2023	Churchill Brothers	13	(0)
2023–2024	Aizawl	17	(0)
2024–2026	Kerala Blasters	3	(0)
2026–	SC Delhi	3	(0)
- * Club domestic league appearances and goals as of 28 October 2026

Nora Fernandes (born 18 June 1998) is an Indian professional footballer who plays as a goalkeeper for Indian Super League club SC Delhi.

== Career ==
=== Salgaocar ===
Fernandes began his professional career with Salgaocar. He played for them in the U-18 I-League and the Goa Professional League. On 11 November 2017, Nora made his debut for Salgaocar in a 2017–18 Goa Professional League game against FC Bardez which ended in a 2–1 loss.

=== Churchill Brothers ===
Fernandes moved to Churchill Brothers in 2020 and got his first game in the 2021–22 season of the I-League. He made his debut in a 2–1 defeat of Kenkre on 10 April 2022 at the Naihati Stadium.

=== Kerala Blasters FC ===
On 7 May, following his tenure at Aizawl FC, Fernandes signed for the Indian Super League club Kerala Blasters FC on a three-year contract until 2027. He made his debut on 10 August in the 2024 Durand Cup match against CISF Protectors, where he came in as a substitute for Som Kumar in the second-half, as the Blasters won the match 7–0 at full-time, keeping a clean-sheet on his debut.

== Career statistics ==
As of 12 August 2024

Appearances and goals by club, season and competition
Club	Season	League			Super Cup		AFC		Other		Total	
Club	Season	Division	Apps	Goals	Apps	Goals	Apps	Goals	Apps	Goals	Apps	Goals
Salgaocar	2017—18	Goa Professional League	2	0	—		—		—		2	0
Salgaocar	2018—19	Goa Professional League	3	0	—		—		—			0
Salgaocar	2019—20	Goa Professional League	4	0	—		—		1 (Note: Appearance in Goa Police Cup)	0		0
Salgaocar	Total											
Churchill Brothers	2020–21	I-League	0	0	0	0	—		0	0	0	0
Churchill Brothers	2021–22	I-League	3	0	0	0	—		4 (Note: Appearances in Goa Professional League)	0	6	0
Churchill Brothers	2022–23	I-League	5	0	4	0	—		1	0	9	0
Churchill Brothers	Total		8	0	4	0	0	0	0	0	12	0
Aizawl	2023–24	I-League	17	0	0	0	—		—		17	0
Kerala Blasters	2024–25	Indian Super League	0	0	0	0	—		1	0	1	0
Career total			25	0	4	0	0	0	1	0	30	0
