= Stendly Fernandes =

Indian footballer

Personal information
- Full name: Stendly Teotonio Fernandes
- Date of birth: 22 April 2000 (age 26)
- Place of birth: Goa, India
- Position: Midfielder

Team information
- Current team: Churchill Brothers
- Number: 7

Youth career
- 2007–2012: Sirlim Sports Club
- 2012–2018: Sporting Goa

Senior career*
Years	Team	Apps	(Gls)
2018–2023	Sporting Goa		
2021	→ Bengaluru United (loan)		(0)
2023–	Churchill Brothers	41	(9)
- * Club domestic league appearances and goals as of 21:56, 6 April 2025 (UTC)

Stendly Teotonio Fernandes (born 22 April 2000) is an Indian professional footballer who plays as a midfielder for Indian Super League club Churchill Brothers. In the Santosh Trophy, he plays for his home state, Goa.

== Career ==
Fernandes played for Sirlim Sports Club in Goa as a seven-year-old. In 2012, he was drafted into Sporting Goa's youth development program. In 2018, he was part of their youth team in All India Football Federation's U-18 Youth League, in the Goa Zone. Fernandes was a student at the Rosary Higher Secondary School, Navelim, during this time. In January that year, he earned the Reliance Foundation Youth Sports scholarship, the only Goan among 19 others. Fernandes played as an attacking midfielder for his team. A 2018 report stated: "There are times when he moves way forward and times when he falls back. When he is up, he is quick to take shots at goals and has shown his penchant to shoot from out of the box often."

=== Sporting Goa ===
Starting 2018, Fernandes played for Sporting Goa Reserves competing in the Goa Football League. In 2019, he captained Sporting Goa's under-20 side to the final of the Goa Football Association's (GFA) U-20 Taca Goa tournament, where they lost to Goan FC. After a loan stint with Bengaluru United in 2021 to compete in the I-League qualifiers, he returned to SC Goa the same year.

=== Churchill Brothers ===
In September 2023, Fernandes' signing was announced by Churchill Brothers, that competed in the I-League. Playing in its 2023–24 season, he scored his first goal for the club in a 4–1 win at home against NEROCA on 10 December. On 4 March 2024, he scored the opening goal against Shillong Lajong in a 2–1 victory.

== Career statistics ==
As of 16 April 2024

Appearances and goals by club, season and competition
Club	Season	League			Cup (Note: Includes Durand Cup and Super Cup)		Other		Total	
Club	Season	Division	Apps	Goals	Apps	Goals	Apps	Goals	Apps	Goals
Sporting Goa	2018–19	Goa Football League	—	—	—	—	—	—	—	—
Sporting Goa	2019–20	Goa Football League	—	—	—	—	—	—	—	—
Bengaluru United (loan)	2021	I-League 2	—	—	—	—	—	—	—	—
Churchill Brothers	2023–24	I-League	22	5	0	0	—	—	22	5
Career total			22	5	0	0	—	—	22	5
