= Richard Costa =

Indian footballer

Personal information
- Date of birth: 5 January 1992 (age 34)
- Place of birth: Navelim, Goa, India
- Position: Midfielder

Team information
- Current team: Churchill Brothers
- Number: 33

Youth career
- Churchill Brothers

Senior career*
| Years | Team | Apps | (Gls) |
| 2012–2017 | Churchill Brothers | 20 | (0) |
| 2017–2018 | East Bengal | 0 | (0) |
| 2018– | Churchill Brothers | 81 | (4) |

International career
| 2014 | India U20 | 4 | (0) |
- * Club domestic league appearances and goals as of 20:20, 10 April 2025 (UTC)

Richard Costa (born 5 January 1992) is an Indian footballer who plays as a midfielder for Indian Super League club Churchill Brothers. He is currently the captain of the team.

== Early life ==
Costa was born in Navelim, a town in the Indian State of Goa. He began playing football at an early age and played for a local club, Juniors Salunkas, as a child. He idolized Goan footballer and midfielder Climax Lawrence, and began playing in that position. Costa was included in the under-20 side of Churchill Brothers after he impressed the owners of the team who saw him play at a local match.

== Career ==
=== Churchill Brothers ===
Costa, after going through his youth career at Churchill Brothers, made his debut for the senior squad in the I-League on 11 October 2012 against ONGC at the Fatorda Stadium, coming on as a 68th-minute substitute for Bikramjit Singh in a match that his team won 5–0.

=== East Bengal ===
In May 2017, East Bengal announced the signing of Richard Costa and Surabuddin Mullick from Churchill Brothers. On 12 January 2018, East Bengal released Gabriel Fernandes and Richard Costa from their squad.

=== Churchill Brothers ===
Costa returned to his previous club Churchill Brothers after he got released from East Bengal. He scored his first goal in the 2023–24 season, on 22 November 2023, a headed goal in the 4–0 against TRAU FC. He also had one assist in the game. He scored again four days later, against Gokulam Kerala, that ended in a 1–1 draw.

== Career statistics ==
=== Club ===
As of 13 March 2024

| Club | Season | League | | | Cup | | AFC | | Total | |
| Club | Season | Division | Apps | Goals | Apps | Goals | Apps | Goals | Apps | Goals |
|---|---|---|---|---|---|---|---|---|---|---|
| Churchill Brothers | 2012–13 | I-League | 1 | 0 | 0 | 0 | 1 (Note: Appearance(s) in AFC Cup) | 0 | 2 | 0 |
| Churchill Brothers | 2013–14 | I-League | 3 | 0 | 0 | 0 | 4 | 0 | 7 | 0 |
| Churchill Brothers | 2016–17 | I-League | 16 | 0 | 3 (Note: Appearance(s) in Federation Cup) | 0 | – | | 19 | 0 |
| Churchill Brothers | Total | | 20 | 0 | 3 | 0 | 5 | 0 | 28 | 0 |
| East Bengal | 2017–18 | I-League | 0 | 0 | 0 | 0 | – | | 0 | 0 |
| Churchill Brothers | 2017–18 | I-League | 8 | 0 | 2 (Note: Appearance(s) in Super Cup) | 0 | – | | 10 | 0 |
| Churchill Brothers | 2018–19 | I-League | 16 | 0 | 0 | 0 | – | | 16 | 0 |
| Churchill Brothers | 2019–20 | I-League | 4 | 0 | 0 | 0 | – | | 4 | 0 |
| Churchill Brothers | 2020–21 | I-League | 6 | 0 | 0 | 0 | – | | 6 | 0 |
| Churchill Brothers | 2021–22 | I-League | 18 | 0 | 0 | 0 | – | | 18 | 0 |
| Churchill Brothers | 2022–23 | I-League | 10 | 1 | 4 | 0 | – | | 14 | 1 |
| Churchill Brothers | 2023–24 | I-League | 17 | 2 | 0 | 0 | – | | 17 | 2 |
| Churchill Brothers | Total | | 79 | 3 | 6 | 0 | 0 | 0 | 85 | 3 |
| Career total | | | 99 | 3 | 9 | 0 | 5 | 0 | 113 | 3 |

== Honours ==
India U20 (Goa India)

- Lusofonia Games Gold medal: 2014
