= Brian Mascarenhas =

Indian footballer (born 1992)

Personal information
- Date of birth: 4 January 1992 (age 34)
- Place of birth: Nuvem, Goa, India
- Height: 1.76 m (5 ft 9 in)
- Position: Left winger

Team information
- Current team: Real Kashmir

Youth career
- 2010–2011: Churchill Brothers

Senior career*
Years	Team	Apps	(Gls)
2011–2012	Dempo	1	(0)
2012–2018	Salgaocar	37	(2)
2018–	Real Kashmir	0	(0)
- * Club domestic league appearances and goals as of 31 July 2018

Brian Mascarenhas (born 4 January 1992) is an Indian footballer who plays as a left winger for Real Kashmir in the I-League.

== Career ==
=== Dempo ===
After spending one season with Churchill Brothers youth team Brian signed with fellow Goan club Dempo S.C. in the I-League and started for the Reserves initially and scored a stunning goal for Dempo Reserves against Calangute from 40 yards out in the Goa Professional League. He then made his Dempo senior debut against his old club Churchill Brothers on 4 December 2011.

=== Salgaocar ===
He left Dempo on 2 June for Salgaocar.

== Career statistics ==
=== Club ===
As of 5 March 2016

Club	Season	League			Cup			AFC			Total		
Club	Season	Apps	Goals	Assists	Apps	Goals	Assists	Apps	Goals	Assists	Apps	Goals	Assists
Dempo	2011–12	1	0	0	0	0	0	0	0	0	1	0	0
Salgaocar	2012–13	9	0	0	0	0	0	-	-	-	9	0	0
Salgaocar	2013–14	11	0	0	0	0	0	-	-	-	11	0	0
Salgaocar	2014–15	11	1	0	0	0	0	-	-	-	11	1	0
Salgaocar	2015–16	6	1	0	0	0	0	-	-	-	6	1	0
Career total		38	2	0	0	0	0	0	0	0	38	2	0

== Honour ==
India U20 (Goa India)

- Lusofonia Games Gold medal: 2014
