= Future Champions Tournament =

- Founded: 2009
- Region: Worldwide
- Current champions: Atlético Madrid
- Website: future-champions.net
- 2017 Future Champions Tournament

The Future Champions Tournament is an international youth association football tournament which was first contested in 2009 in the Gauteng region of South Africa. The 3rd and the 5th edition took place in Belo Horizonte, Brazil.

== List of champions ==
Below is the list of champions:

Edition	Season	Place	Champion	Score	Runner-up
I	2009	(South Africa) Gauteng	(Argentina) Boca Juniors	2-0	(Tunisia) Espérance de Tunis
II	2010	(South Africa) Gauteng	(China) Shandong Luneng	0-0 (4-3)	(France) Paris SG
III	2010	(Brazil) Belo Horizonte	(Brazil) Atlético Mineiro	0-0 (5-3)	(Brazil) Cruzeiro
IV	2011	(South Africa) Gauteng	(Brazil) Atlético Mineiro	3-0	(Russia) Rubin Kazan
V	2011	(Brazil) Belo Horizonte	(Brazil) Atlético Mineiro	3-3 (6-5)	(Brazil) Cruzeiro
VI	2012	(South Africa) Gauteng	(Brazil) Atlético Mineiro	2-1	(Uruguay) Nacional
VII	2013	(South Africa) Gauteng	(Mexico) Club Tijuana	1-1 (4-3)	(England) Everton
VIII	2014	(South Africa) Johannesburg	(Brazil) Atlético Mineiro	0-0 (7-6)	(Mexico) Club Tijuana
IX	2015	(South Africa) Gauteng	(Italy) Torino FC	5-4	(South Africa) Supersport United FC
X	2016	(South Africa) Gauteng	(Spain) Atlético Madrid	2-1	(South Africa) Bidvest Wits
