= Denny Antwi =

Ghanaian footballer (born 1993)

Personal information
- Full name: Dennis Agyare Antwi
- Date of birth: 12 January 1993 (age 33)
- Place of birth: Accra, Ghana
- Height: 1.83 m (6 ft 0 in)
- Position: Forward

Team information
- Current team: Gokulam Kerala

Youth career
- 2009–2010: Accra Academy

Senior career*
Years	Team	Apps	(Gls)
2009–2011	Hearts of Oak		
2011–2013	Kelantan FA	13	(2)
2013	→ Perlis FA (loan)	5	(2)
2013	Inter Allies	12	(3)
2014–2015	FC Rosengård 1917	4	(0)
2015–2016	Jerv	26	(9)
2016–2018	Start	29	(6)
2018	→ Åsane (loan)	24	(6)
2019	Trelleborg	20	(3)
2020–2021	Gokulam Kerala	15	(11)
2021–2022	Al-Taawon	8	(2)
2022–2023	Al-Naft	0	(0)
2023	Al-Safa	4	(0)
2023–24	Al-Talaba	3	(0)
2024	Al-Najaf SC	6	(0)
2024-2026	Al-Hudood	29	(7)
2026-	Gokulam Kerala	0	(0)
- * Club domestic league appearances and goals

Dennis Agyare "Denny" Antwi (born 12 January 1993) is a Ghanaian professional footballer who plays as a forward for Gokulam Kerala.

== Club career ==
Antwi started his career with Accra Academy in 2009.

=== Kelantan FA ===
Antwi signed with Malaysian Super League giant Kelantan FA for two years contract for 2012 Malaysia Super League seasons. He makes great appearances with Kelantan in the Super League. He also was the 5th Ghanaian footballer ever to play for Kelantan FA after Edward Aboagye, Enock Bentil, Ishaq Debrah and Emmanuel Okine. The team had their first major success in the 2012 season, when they have won treble which is Malaysia Super League championship, Malaysia FA Cup and Malaysia Cup. Domestically, TRW have won the Malaysia Super League Championship on 2 occasions, most recently in the 2012 season, 2 Malaysia Cup titles, 2 Malaysia FA Cup titles, 1 Charity Shield and 1 Malaysia Premier League title.2012 was their debut playing in the AFC Cup. They played well in the group stage to gain first place. However, the team lost in the quarter final to Erbil SC.

=== Loan to Perlis FA ===
After a season played for Kelantan, Antwi was loan to Malaysian Premier League based club, Perlis FA caused of his young age. However, he was terminated his contract with Kelantan and back to Ghana.

=== Inter Allies ===
Antwi joins newly promoted club, International Allies F.C. which competing in the Ghana Premier League.

=== FC Rosengård 1917 ===
He signed in January 2014 with Swedish Division 2 Östra Götaland side FC Rosengård 1917.

=== Jerv ===
In August 2015, Antwi signed a 1.5 year contract with Norwegian OBOS-ligaen side FK Jerv. In his first season, he played 11 times and scored four goals in OBOS-ligaen. He also scored one goal and played in all four play-off matches for promotion to top flight Tippeligaen, just to see his team lose the final match of the play-off against local rivals IK Start 3–1 after a 1–1 draw at home.

After netting five goals in 15 league appearances for Jerv in the 2016 season, Antwi signed for IK Start at the end of July 2016 in a controversial transfer. Initially he signed a pre-contract, which would bring him to Start on a free transfer on 1 December 2016. Then the player himself publicly announced that he wanted to move to neighbouring club Start immediately, and the clubs agreed upon a compensation fee expected to be around 500 000 Norwegian kroner (around €55 000 at the time).

Antwi played a total of 32 official games and scored 10 goals for Jerv.

=== Start ===
After signing with Start at the end of July 2016, Antwi made his Tippeligaen debut against Sarpsborg 08 as a 67th-minute substitute. Start went on to lose Antwi's debut game 1–0, which meant they extended the number of games without winning in Tippeligaen to 33, in the number 33's 33rd game in Norwegian football. Antwi scored only one goal, a tap-in in an away fixture against Lillestrøm SK, in 11 appearances in his debut sesong in Tippeligaen. His debut goal will be remembered for Antwi being attacked by a Lillestrøm fan after celebrating in front of the home supporters, Kanarifansen.

Antwi was loaned out to Åsane Fotball in February 2018, and returned to Start at the end of 2018.

=== Trelleborg ===
After being released from IK Start, Antwi signed for Superettan club Trelleborgs FF on 23 March 2019. He left the club at the end of the years.

=== Al-Safa ===
On 25 July 2023, Antwi joined Saudi First Division club Al-Safa.

=== Al-Talaba ===
On 14 September 2023, Antwi joined Al-Talaba.

== International career ==
Antwi once attended a national training camp with the Ghana national under-23 football team for the 2011 CAF U-23 Championship qualification. However, he was never chosen for the final squad.

== Career statistics ==
As of 27 March 2021

Club	Season	League			League Cup		Domestic Cup		Continental		Total	
Club	Season	Division	Apps	Goals	Apps	Goals	Apps	Goals	Apps	Goals	Apps	Goal
Gokulam Kerala	2020–21	I-League	15	11	—	—	2 (Note: Appearances in IFA Shield)	4	0	0	17	15
Career total			15	11	0	0	2	4	0	0	17	15

== Honours ==
Gokulam Kerala

- I-League: 2020–21

Individual

- I-League Team of the season: 2020–21
