= Emmanuel Essien (footballer) =

Ghanaian footballer

Personal information
- Full name: Emmanuel Kofi Essien
- Date of birth: 2 July 2001 (age 25)
- Place of birth: Accra, Ghana
- Height: 1.72 m (5 ft 8 in)
- Position: Central midfielder

Senior career*
Years	Team	Apps	(Gls)
2019–2020	Skënderbeu	8	(0)
2020–2021	CF Sant Rafel	8	(0)
- * Club domestic league appearances and goals as of 19:02, 19 June 2022 (UTC)

Emmanuel Kofi Essien (born 2 July 2001) is a Ghanaian professional footballer who play as a central midfielder who is currently a free agent. He has previously played for Skenderbeu and Sant Rafel.
