= 2020–21 I-League =

14th season of the I-League

Hero I-League
- Season: 2020–21
- Dates: 9 January – 27 March 2021
- Champions: Gokulam Kerala; 1st I-League title 1st Indian title
- AFC Cup: Gokulam Kerala
- Matches: 80
- Goals: 216 (2.7 per match)
- Top goalscorer: Bidyashagar Singh (12 goals)
- Best goalkeeper: Kiran Chemjong (105 mins per goal)
- Highest scoring: Indian Arrows 2–5 Churchill Brothers (10 January 2021); Gokulam Kerala 4–3 Punjab (14 January 2021); Real Kashmir 4–3 NEROCA (13 February 2021)
- Longest winning run: TRAU (5 games)
- Longest unbeaten run: Churchill Brothers (11 games)
- Longest winless run: Indian Arrows (7 games)
- Longest losing run: NEROCA (6 games)

The 2020–21 I-League (known as the Hero I-League for sponsorship reasons) was the 14th season of the I-League, one of the top tier Indian professional football leagues, since its establishment in 2007. The tournament was hosted in bio-secure bubble across four venues in Kolkata due to the COVID-19 pandemic situation in India.

Mohun Bagan was declared the champion of the 2019–20 season after the cancellation of matches due to the COVID-19 pandemic, since the second placed team could not catch up even if all 20 games were completed. However, following Mohun Bagan's merger with Indian Super League (ISL) club ATK, the club began competing in the ISL from the 2020–21 ISL season.

Throughout the First Phase, Churchill Brothers kept its dominance with an unbeaten run of 11 games, while in the Second Phase, Gokulam Kerala, Churchill Brothers and TRAU traded the lead several times throughout the Championship Stage. Entering the final matchday, Gokulam Kerala were ahead on goal difference. However, with the Gokulam and TRAU facing off, either team could claim the title with a win. A draw in the Gokulam Kerala–TRAU match and a win were needed for Churchill Brothers to be crowned champions. The game ended in a 4–1 win for Gokulam, giving the Malabarians their first I-league title and qualification for the AFC Cup. NEROCA finished bottom of the Relegation Stage and were to relegated, but were reinstated by AIFF after the viewing the situation of the COVID-19 pandemic.

== Changes from last season ==
=== Changes in rules and regulations ===
- AIFF has implemented the '3+1' foreigners rule from this season. Under this rule, each club will be allowed to field a maximum of four foreign players and one of those four foreign players must be from an AFC affiliated country.
- Due to the COVID-19 pandemic, this season's league format was shortened. All teams faced each other once during the first leg of the league, then were divided into two different groups. According to the points table from the first leg, the top six teams would face each other once again in the Championship stage, where the team with most points (cumulative points collected from all fifteen matches) will be declared the winner of the league and qualify for the 2022 AFC Cup group stage. The other five teams played against each other in a Relegation stage where the team with the lowest points (cumulative points collected from all fourteen matches) would be relegated to the 2nd Division League.

=== Number of clubs ===
All India Football Federation (AIFF) issued an invitation to accept bids for new clubs from non I-League cities, like Delhi, Gangtok, Ranchi, Jaipur, Jodhpur, Mangalore, Bhopal, Lucknow, Kanpur, Ahmedabad and Calicut among many others, to join the league from 2020 onward. The invitation mentioned that the entity which won the bid would be granted the right to own and operate a new football club. On 12 August, AIFF announced that Sudeva of Delhi would join the league from this season and Sreenidi Deccan, which is based in Hyderabad, would be playing from Visakhapatnam from the following season.

East Bengal and Mohun Bagan moved to the Indian Super League, when East Bengal joined the league as an expansion team, while Mohun Bagan and ATK, the champions of 2019–20 ISL season, merged to play as ATK Mohun Bagan in the ISL.

==== Promoted clubs ====
Promoted from the 2020 I-League qualifiers

- Mohammedan

==== Relegated clubs ====
Relegated from the 2019–20 I-League

- None

== Teams ==
Locations of the I-League clubs

Locations of the stadiums for I-league

=== Stadiums and locations ===
Due to the COVID-19 pandemic, all the matches would be played in a single venue. AIFF declared Kolkata as the venue on 14 August. Matches were played in Vivekananda Yuba Bharati Krirangan, Kishore Bharati Krirangan and Mohun Bagan Ground in Kolkata, and Kalyani Stadium in Kalyani.

Stadium	Capacity	Location
Vivekananda Yuba Bharati Krirangan	85,000	Salt Lake, Kolkata
Kishore Bharati Krirangan	12,000	Jadavpore, Kolkata
Mohun Bagan Ground	20,000	Maidan, Kolkata
Kalyani Municipal Stadium	20,000	Kalyani, Nadia

Team	Location
Aizawl	Aizawl, Mizoram
Chennai City	Coimbatore, Tamil Nadu
Churchill Brothers	Margao, Goa
Gokulam Kerala	Calicut, Kerala
Indian Arrows	Mumbai, Maharashtra
Mohammedan	Kolkata, West Bengal
NEROCA	Imphal, Manipur
Real Kashmir	Srinagar, Jammu and Kashmir
TRAU	Imphal, Manipur
Sudeva Delhi	New Delhi, Delhi
RoundGlass Punjab	Ludhiana, Punjab

=== Personnel and sponsorship ===
Team	Head coach	Captain	Kit Manufacturer	Shirt Sponsor
Aizawl	(India) Yan Law	(Liberia) Alfred Jaryan	Vamos	NECS Limited
Chennai City	(Singapore) Satyasagara	(India) Charles Anandraj	Nivia Sports	TVS Group
Churchill Brothers	(Spain) Fernando Santiago Varela	(Ivory Coast) Bazie Armand	Nivia Sports	Churchill
Gokulam Kerala	(Italy) Vincenzo Alberto Annese	(Ghana) Mohamed Awal	SEGA	Sree Gokulam Group
Indian Arrows	(India) Shanmugam Venkatesh	(India) Lalchhanhima Sailo	SIX5SIX	Hero MotoCorp
Mohammedan	(India) Sankarlal Chakraborty	(Nigeria) Kingsley Obumneme	Trak Only	BunkerHill Sports
NEROCA	(India) Gift Raikhan	(India) Bishorjit Loitongbam	Ambition Sportswear	Grow Manipur Team
Punjab	(Republic of Ireland) Curtis Fleming	(India) Bikramjit Singh	T10 Sports	RoundGlass Sports
Real Kashmir	(Scotland) David Robertson	(Scotland) Mason Robertson	Adidas	Hotel CH2
Sudeva Delhi	(Bhutan) Chencho Dorji	(India) Ajay Singh	Puma	Liquid Life
TRAU	(India) Nandakumar Singh	(India) Phalguni Konsam	Romi Bag	HVS Foundation

=== Managerial changes ===
Team	Outgoing manager	Manner of departure	Date of vacancy	Ref.	Position in table	Incoming manager	Date of appointment	Ref.
Gokulam Kerala	(Spain) Fernando Santiago Varela	End of contract	17 August 2020		Pre-season	(Italy) Vincenzo Alberto Annese	19 August 2020	
Churchill Brothers	(India) Mateus Costa	End of interim period	23 September 2020		Pre-season	(Spain) Fernando Santiago Varela	23 September 2020	
Chennai City	(Singapore) Akbar Nawas	Mutual consent	26 October 2020		Pre-season	(Singapore) Satyasagara	10 December 2020	
Aizawl	(India) Stanley Rozario	Mutual consent	18 January 2021		10th	(India) Yan Law	19 January 2021	
Mohammedan	(Spain) José Hevia	Mutual consent	19 February 2021		7th	(India) Sankarlal Chakraborty	19 February 2021	

== Foreign players ==
Minimum of three and maximum of four foreign players including one player from AFC—affiliated country per team. Indian Arrows cannot sign any foreign players as they are a part of AIFF's developmental program. The newly joined team, Sudeva Delhi fielded an all-Indian squad for its debut I-League season.

Team	Player 1	Player 2	Player 3	AFC Player	Former Player(s)
Aizawl	(Liberia) Alfred Jaryan	-	-	(Nepal) Abhishek Rijal	(Nigeria) Princewill Emeka (Uganda) Richard Kasagga
Chennai City	(Serbia) Vladimir Molerović	(Serbia) Demir Avdić	(Serbia) Elvedin Škrijelj	(Singapore) Iqbal Hussain	
Churchill Brothers	(Honduras) Clayvin Zuniga	(Ivory Coast) Bazie Armand	(Slovenia) Luka Majcen	(Lebanon) Hamza Kheir	
Gokulam Kerala	(Ghana) Philip Adjah	(Ghana) Denny Antwi	(Ghana) Mohamed Awal	(Afghanistan) Sharif Mukhammad	
Mohammedan	(Nigeria) Kingsley Obumneme	(Nigeria) John Chidi	(Spain) Pedro Manzi	(Bangladesh) Jamal Bhuyan	(Ghana) Mohammed Fatau (Nigeria) Raphael Onwrebe
NEROCA	(Liberia) Varney Kallon	(Trinidad and Tobago) Nathaniel García	(Trinidad and Tobago) Judah García	(Nepal) Prakash Budhathoki	
Punjab	(Bhutan) Chencho Gyeltshen	(Senegal) Baba Diawara	(Spain) Joseba Beitia	(Nepal) Kiran Chemjong	(Brazil) Danilo Quipapá
Real Kashmir	(Cameroon) Aser Pierrick Dipanda	(Nigeria) Lukman Adefemi	(Scotland) Mason Robertson	(Afghanistan) Zohib Islam Amiri	
TRAU	(Brazil) Helder Lobato	(Nigeria) Joseph Olaleye	(Brazil) Bruno Rodrigues	(Tajikistan) Komron Tursunov	

== First phase ==
=== Standings ===
Pos	Team	Pld	W	D	L	GF	GA	GD	Pts	Qualification or relegation
1	Churchill Brothers	10	6	4	0	15	6	+9	22	Promote to Championship Stage (Group A)
2	Punjab	10	5	3	2	12	7	+5	18	Promote to Championship Stage (Group A)
3	Real Kashmir	10	4	5	1	18	9	+9	17	Promote to Championship Stage (Group A)
4	Gokulam Kerala	10	5	1	4	20	14	+6	16	Promote to Championship Stage (Group A)
5	TRAU	10	4	4	2	17	13	+4	16	Promote to Championship Stage (Group A)
6	Mohammedan	10	4	4	2	9	8	+1	16	Promote to Championship Stage (Group A)
7	Aizawl	10	4	3	3	13	8	+5	15	Demote to Relegation Stage (Group B)
8	Sudeva Delhi	10	2	3	5	11	11	0	9	Demote to Relegation Stage (Group B)
9	Chennai City	10	3	0	7	7	19	−12	9	Demote to Relegation Stage (Group B)
10	NEROCA	10	2	2	6	13	15	−2	8	Demote to Relegation Stage (Group B)
11	Indian Arrows	10	1	1	8	6	31	−25	4	Demote to Relegation Stage (Group B)

Source: I-League
Rules for classification: 1) points; 2) head-to-head points; 3) head-to-head goal difference; 4) goal difference; 5) number of goals scored; 6) drawing of lots

=== Fixtures and results ===
All matches were played at neutral venues. The "home" and "away" are designated for administrative purposes.

Home \ Away	CHB	PUN	REK	GOK	TRAU	MDS	AIZ	SDA	CNC	NER	IDA
Churchill Brothers	—	—	0–0	—	1–1	—	0–0	2–0	—	1–0	—
Punjab	0–1	—	—	—	—	0–0	1–0	0–0	2–0	—	—
Real Kashmir	—	1–1	—	—	1–1	—	—	1–1	—	4–3	6–0
Gokulam Kerala	2–3	4–3	0–0	—	—	—	—	—	1–2	—	4–0
TRAU	—	0–2	—	1–3	—	2–2	1–0	—	2–0	—	—
Mohammedan	0–0	—	2–0	2–1	—	—	—	—	2–1	0–0	—
Aizawl	—	—	1–3	2–0	—	3–0	—	1–1	—	—	1–1
Sudeva Delhi	—	—	—	0–1	2–3	0–1	—	—	—	0–2	3–0
Chennai City	1–2	—	0–2	—	—	—	0–3	0–4	—	—	1–0
NEROCA	—	0–1	—	1–4	1–1	—	1–2	—	1–2	—	—
Indian Arrows	2–5	1–2	—	—	1–5	1–0	—	—	—	0–4	—

Source: I-League
Legend: Blue = home team win; Yellow = draw; Red = away team win.

=== Positions by matchday ===
The table lists the positions of teams after each round mentioned in official fixtures.

Matchday	1	2	3	4	5	6	7	8	9	10	11
Aizawl	9	10	6	7	3	4	8	8	5	7	7
Chennai City	2	7	9	10	7	6	9	9	9	9	9
Churchill Brothers	1	1	1	1	1	1	1	3	1	1	1
Gokulam Kerala	8	5	10	3	4	6	9	4	4	3	4
Indian Arrows	11	11	11	11	11	11	11	11	11	11	11
Mohammedan	3	3	3	4	6	7	4	5	7	6	6
NEROCA	7	9	4	6	10	10	10	10	10	10	10
Punjab	4	6	8	9	9	5	2	1	2	4	2
Real Kashmir	5	2	2	5	5	2	3	2	3	2	3
Sudeva Delhi	10	4	5	8	8	3	7	7	8	8	8
TRAU	6	8	7	2	2	8	5	6	6	5	5

Promotion to Championship stage (Group A)
Demotion to Relegation stage (Group B)

Source: I-League

=== Results by games ===
Match	1	2	3	4	5	6	7	8	9	10
Aizawl	L	W	D	W	D	L	D	W	L	W
Chennai City	W	L	L	W	L	W	L	L	L	L
Churchill Brothers	W	D	W	W	D	D	D	W	W	W
Gokulam Kerala	L	W	L	W	D	L	W	W	W	L
Indian Arrows	L	L	L	D	L	L	L	W	L	L
Mohammedan	W	D	D	D	D	W	L	L	W	W
NEROCA	D	W	L	L	D	L	L	W	L	L
Punjab	W	L	L	D	D	W	W	W	D	W
Real Kashmir	D	W	D	D	W	D	W	D	W	L
Sudeva Delhi	L	W	D	L	D	W	D	L	L	L
TRAU	D	D	D	W	D	L	W	L	W	W

Source: I-League
W = Win; D = Draw; L = Loss

== Second phase ==
=== Championship stage (Group A) ===
Pos	Team	Pld	W	D	L	GF	GA	GD	Pts	Qualification
1	Gokulam Kerala	15	9	2	4	31	17	+14	29	Champions and Qualification for 2022 AFC Cup group stage
2	Churchill Brothers	15	8	5	2	22	17	+5	29	
3	TRAU	15	7	5	3	27	19	+8	26	
4	Punjab	15	6	4	5	18	15	+3	22	
5	Real Kashmir	15	5	6	4	23	18	+5	21	
6	Mohammedan	15	5	5	5	18	20	−2	20	

Source: I-League
Rules for classification: 1) points; 2) head-to-head points; 3) head-to-head goal difference; 4) goal difference; 5) number of goals scored; 6) drawing of lots

==== Fixtures and results ====
All matches were played at neutral venues. The "home" and "away" are designated for administrative purposes.

Home \ Away	CHB	GOK	MDS	PUN	REK	TRAU
Churchill Brothers	—	0–3	1–4	3–2	—	—
Gokulam Kerala	—	—	—	—	1–1	4–1
Mohammedan	—	1–2	—	—	—	0–4
Punjab	—	0–1	3–3	—	1–0	—
Real Kashmir	1–2	—	2–1	—	—	1–3
TRAU	1–1	—	—	1–0	—	—

Source: I-League
Legend: Blue = home team win; Yellow = draw; Red = away team win.

==== Positions by matchday ====
The table lists the positions of teams after each round mentioned in official fixtures.

Matchday	1	2	3	4	5
Churchill Brothers	1	1	2	3	2
Gokulam Kerala	3	2	3	1	1
Mohammedan	6	6	4	5	6
Punjab	4	4	5	4	4
Real Kashmir	5	5	6	6	5
TRAU	2	3	1	2	3

Source: I-League

==== Results by games ====
Match	1	2	3	4	5
Churchill Brothers	W	L	L	D	W
Gokulam Kerala	W	W	D	W	W
Mohammedan	L	D	W	L	L
Punjab	L	D	L	W	L
Real Kashmir	L	L	D	L	W
TRAU	W	W	W	D	L

Source: I-League
W = Win; D = Draw; L = Loss

=== Relegation stage (Group B) ===
Pos	Team	Pld	W	D	L	GF	GA	GD	Pts
1	Aizawl	14	7	3	4	21	12	+9	24
2	Sudeva Delhi (Note: Sudeva Delhi were exempted from relegation for this season, as they had achieved a direct entry into the league.)	14	5	3	6	16	14	+2	18
3	Chennai City	14	5	0	9	16	25	−9	15
4	Indian Arrows (Note: Indian Arrows were exempted from relegation, as they are an AIFF developmental team.)	14	3	1	10	11	38	−27	10
5	NEROCA (Note: NEROCA were relegated, but were reinstated by AIFF after the viewing the situation of the COVID-19 pandemic.)	14	2	2	10	14	22	−8	8

Source: I-League
Rules for classification: 1) points; 2) head-to-head points; 3) head-to-head goal difference; 4) goal difference; 5) number of goals scored; 6) drawing of lots

==== Fixtures and results ====
All matches were played at neutral venues. The "home" and "away" are designated for administrative purposes.

Home \ Away	AIZ	NER	SDA	CNC	IDA
Aizawl	—	—	2–1	—	1–2
NEROCA	0–1	—	—	1–2	—
Sudeva Delhi	—	1–0	—	—	1–0
Chennai City	1–3	—	1–2	—	—
Indian Arrows	—	3–0	—	0–5	—

Source: I-League
Legend: Blue = home team win; Yellow = draw; Red = away team win.

==== Positions by matchday ====
The table lists the positions of teams after each round mentioned in official fixtures.

Matchday	1	2	3	4	5
Aizawl	1	1	1	1	1
Chennai City	3	3	3	3	3
Indian Arrows	5	5	4	4	4
NEROCA	4	4	5	5	5
Sudeva Delhi	2	2	2	2	2

Source: I-League

=== Results by games ===
Match	1	2	3	4
Aizawl	W	L	W	W
Chennai City	L	W	L	W
Indian Arrows	W	L	W	L
NEROCA	L	L	L	L
Sudeva Delhi	W	W	W	L

Source: I-League
W = Win; D = Draw; L = Loss

== Final standings ==
Pos	Team	Pld	W	D	L	GF	GA	GD	Pts
1	Gokulam Kerala (C)	15	9	2	4	31	17	+14	29
2	Churchill Brothers	15	8	5	2	22	17	+5	29
3	TRAU	15	7	5	3	27	19	+8	26
4	Punjab	15	6	4	5	18	15	+3	22
5	Real Kashmir	15	5	6	4	23	17	+6	21
6	Mohammedan	15	5	5	5	18	20	−2	20
7	Aizawl	14	7	3	4	20	12	+8	24
8	Sudeva Delhi	14	5	3	6	16	14	+2	18
9	Chennai City	14	5	0	9	16	25	−9	15
10	Indian Arrows	14	3	1	10	11	38	−27	10
11	NEROCA	14	2	2	10	14	22	−8	8

Source: I-League
Rules for classification: 1) points; 2) head-to-head points; 3) head-to-head goal difference; 4) goal difference; 5) number of goals scored; 6) drawing of lots
(C) Champions

== Season statistics ==
=== Scoring ===
As of 27 March 2021

==== Top scorers ====
The table includes only the top 10 goalscorers of this season.

Rank	Player	Club	Goals
1	(India) Bidyashagar Singh	TRAU	12
2	(Slovenia) Luka Majcen	Churchill Brothers	11
2	(Ghana) Denny Antwi	Gokulam Kerala	11
4	(Honduras) Clayvin Zuniga	Churchill Brothers	8
5	(Bhutan) Chencho Gyeltshen	Punjab	7
6	(Tajikistan) Komron Tursunov	TRAU	6
6	(Scotland) Mason Robertson	Real Kashmir	6
6	(Spain) Pedro Manzi	Mohammedan	6
6	(Nigeria) Lukman Adefemi	Real Kashmir	6
10	(Ghana) Philip Adjah	Gokulam Kerala	5
Source: I-League

==== Top Indian scorers ====
The table includes only the list of top Indian goalscorers with more than 2 goals in this season.

Rank	Player	Club	Goals
1	Bidyasagar Singh	TRAU	12
2	MC Malsawmzuala	Aizawl	3
2	Lalremsanga Fanai	Aizawl	3
2	William Pauliankhum	Sudeva Delhi	3
2	Harsh Patre	Indian Arrows	3
2	Vineeth Velmurugan	Chennai City	3
2	Konsam Phalguni Singh	TRAU	3
2	Brandon Vanlalremdika	Aizawl	3
2	Kean Lewis	Sudeva Delhi	3
2	Danish Farooq Bhat	Real Kashmir	3
2	Emil Benny	Gokulam Kerala	3
2	Songpu Singsit	NEROCA	3
Source: I-League

==== Top assists ====
The table includes only the top 10 assist providers of the season.

Rank	Player	Club	Assists
1	(Ghana) Denny Antwi	Gokulam Kerala	7
2	(Tajikistan) Komron Tursunov	TRAU	6
3	(India) Sena Ralte	Real Kashmir	5
4	(Nigeria) Joseph Olaleye	TRAU	4
4	(India) Tirthankar Sarkar	Mohammedan	4
4	(India) Deepak Devrani	Gokulam Kerala	4
7	(India) Songpu Singsit	NEROCA	3
7	(Slovenia) Luka Majcen	Churchill Brothers	3
7	(Trinidad and Tobago) Nathaniel García	NEROCA	3
7	(India) Bryce Miranda	Churchill Brothers	3
Source: Global Sports Archive

==== Hat-tricks ====
Player	Club	Against	Goals	Date
(India) Bidyashagar Singh	TRAU	Mohammedan	3	5 March 2021
(India) Bidyashagar Singh	TRAU	Real Kashmir	3	10 March 2021
(Honduras) Clayvin Zuniga	Churchill Brothers	Indian Arrows	3	10 January 2021
(Nigeria) Lukman Adefemi	Real Kashmir	NEROCA	3	13 February 2021

=== Clean Sheets ===
As of 21 March 2021

The table includes only the list of top goalkeepers with more than 1 cleansheet in this season.

Rank	Player	Club	Clean sheets
1	(Nepal) Kiran Chemjong	Punjab	7
2	(India) Mithun Samanta	Real Kashmir	5
2	(India) Rakshit Dagar	Sudeva Delhi	5
4	(India) Shibinraj Kunniyil	Churchill Brothers	4
4	(India) Ubaid Kadavath	Gokulam Kerala	4
6	(India) Subham Roy	Mohammedan	3
6	(India) Lalmuansanga	Aizawl	3
6	(India) Bishorjit Singh	NEROCA	3
9	(India) Shilton Paul	Churchill Brothers	2
9	(India) Ahan Prakash	Indian Arrows	2
9	(India) Amrit Gope	TRAU	2
9	(India) Zothanmawia	Aizawl	2
Source: I-League

=== Discipline ===
As of 27 March 2021

- Most yellow cards: 5
  - Lalrindika Ralte (Real Kashmir)
  - Sairuat Kima (Sudeva Delhi)
- Most red cards: 2
  - Vincy Barretto (Gokulam Kerala)

== Awards ==
- Match 1 - Match 55 = First Phase
- Match 56 - Match 80 = Second Phase

=== Hero of the Match ===
Match No.	Hero of the Match		Match No.	Hero of the Match		Match No.	Hero of the Match	
Match No.	Player	Club	Match No.	Player	Club	Match No.	Player	Club
Match 1	(India) Faisal Ali	Mohammedan	Match 28	(India) Lalmuansanga	Aizawl	Match 55	(Nepal) Kiran Kumar Limbu	Punjab
Match 2	(India) Pritam Singh	Punjab	Match 29	(Cameroon) Dipanda Dicka	Real Kashmir	Match 56	(India) Suresh Meitei	Churchill Brothers
Match 3	(India) Vijay Nagappan	Chennai City	Match 30	(Bhutan) Chencho Gyeltshen	Punjab	Match 57	(India) Bidyashagar Singh	TRAU
Match 4	(Brazil) Helder Lobato Ribeiro	TRAU	Match 31	(India) Asheer Akhtar	Mohammedan	Match 58	(Ghana) Denny Antwi	Gokulam Kerala
Match 5	(Honduras) Clayvin Zuniga	Churchill Brothers	Match 32	(India) Shilton Paul	Churchill Brothers	Match 59	(India) Sairuat Kima	Sudeva Delhi
Match 6	(Ghana) Denny Antwi	Gokulam Kerala	Match 33	(India) Shankar Sampingiraj	Chennai City	Match 60	(India) Halen Nongtdu	Indian Arrows
Match 7	(India) Kean Lewis	Sudeva Delhi	Match 34	(Senegal) Baba Diawara	Punjab	Match 61	(Bhutan) Chencho Gyeltshen	Punjab
Match 8	(India) Bryce Miranda	Churchill Brothers	Match 35	(India) Amrit Gope	TRAU	Match 62	(India) Bidyashagar Singh	TRAU
Match 9	(Cameroon) Dipanda Dicka	Real Kashmir	Match 36	(India) Emil Benny	Gokulam Kerala	Match 63	(Ghana) Denny Antwi	Gokulam Kerala
Match 10	(India) Yumkhaibam Singh	NEROCA	Match 37	(Nepal) Kiran Kumar Limbu	Punjab	Match 64	(India) Lalliansanga	Aizawl
Match 11	(Lebanon) Hamza Kheir	Churchill Brothers	Match 38	(Nigeria) Lukman Adefemi	Real Kashmir	Match 65	(India) Jockson Dhas	Chennai City
Match 12	(Tajikistan) Komron Tursunov	TRAU	Match 39	(India) Ahan Prakash	Indian Arrows	Match 66	(India) Naocha Singh	Gokulam Kerala
Match 13	(India) Shaiborlang Kharpan	Sudeva Delhi	Match 40	(India) Rakshit Dagar	Sudeva Delhi	Match 67	(Tajikistan) Komron Tursunov	TRAU
Match 14	(India) MC Malsawmzuala	Aizawl	Match 41	(India) R Malsawmtluanga	Aizawl	Match 68	(Spain) Pedro Manzi	Mohammedan
Match 15	(Trinidad and Tobago) Judah García	NEROCA	Match 42	(Cameroon) Dipanda Dicka	Real Kashmir	Match 69	(India) Parthib Gogoi	Indian Arrows
Match 16	(India) Bidyashagar Singh	TRAU	Match 43	(Slovenia) Luka Majcen	Churchill Brothers	Match 70	(India) Gursimrat Singh Gill	Sudeva Delhi
Match 17	(India) Sajad Hussain Parray	Indian Arrows	Match 44	(India) Bishorjit Singh	NEROCA	Match 71	(India) Shubho Paul	Sudeva Delhi
Match 18	(India) Ruivah Hormipam	Punjab	Match 45	(India) Vincy Barretto	Gokulam Kerala	Match 72	(India) Brandon Vanlalremdika	Aizawl
Match 19	(Slovenia) Luka Majcen	Churchill Brothers	Match 46	(Scotland) Mason Robertson	Real Kashmir	Match 73	(India) Konsam Phalguni Singh	TRAU
Match 20	(Ghana) Philip Adjah	Gokulam Kerala	Match 47	(India) Vincy Barretto	Gokulam Kerala	Match 74	(Ghana) Denny Antwi	Gokulam Kerala
Match 21	(Nepal) Kiran Chemjong	Punjab	Match 48	(India) Suraj Rawat	Mohammedan	Match 75	(Bhutan) Chencho Gyeltshen	Punjab
Match 22	(Serbia) Elvedin Škrijelj	Chennai City	Match 49	(Honduras) Clayvin Zuniga	Churchill Brothers	Match 76	(Serbia) Vladimir Molerović	Chennai City
Match 23	(India) Bidyashagar Singh	TRAU	Match 50	(Tajikistan) Komron Tursunov	TRAU	Match 77	(India) Rohmingthanga Bawlte	Aizawl
Match 24	(India) PC Laldinpuia	Aizawl	Match 51	(Spain) Pedro Manzi	Mohammedan	Match 78	(India) Dharmaraj Ravanan	Real Kashmir
Match 25	(India) Emil Benny	Gokulam Kerala	Match 52	(India) Konsam Phalguni Singh	TRAU	Match 79	(India) Emil Benny	Gokulam Kerala
Match 26	(India) Ngangbam Naocha	Sudeva Delhi	Match 53	(India) Lalmuansanga	Aizawl	Match 80	(Honduras) Clayvin Zuniga	Churchill Brothers
Match 27	(India) Subham Roy	Mohammedan	Match 54	(Slovenia) Luka Majcen	Churchill Brothers	Source: The AIFF		

== Season awards ==
Award	Winner	Club
Hero of the League	(India) Bidyashagar Singh	TRAU
Golden Boot	(India) Bidyashagar Singh	TRAU
Golden Glove	(Nepal) Kiran Chemjong	Punjab
Jarnail Singh Award (Best Defender)	(Lebanon) Hamza Kheir	Churchill Brothers
Best Midfielder	(India) Konsam Phalguni Singh	TRAU
Syed Abdul Rahim Award (Best Coach)	(India) Leimapokpam Nandakumar Singh	TRAU
Emerging Player of the League	(India) Emil Benny	Gokulam Kerala

== Team of the season ==

I-League team of 2020–21

Source: arunfoot.com

== See also ==
- 2020–21 Indian Super League
