= Vladimir Molerović =

Serbian footballer

Personal information
- Full name: Vladimir Molerović
- Date of birth: 14 April 1992 (age 34)
- Place of birth: Loznica, Serbia, Yugoslavia
- Height: 1.87 m (6 ft 2 in)
- Position: Defensive midfielder

Team information
- Current team: Vidojevica Lešnica

Senior career*
Years	Team	Apps	(Gls)
2010–2012	Drina Zvornik	1	(0)
2014–2015	Dunav Stari Banovci		
2015–2017	Šumadija Aranđelovac		
2017–2019	Drina Zvornik		
2019	Sloboda Uzice	1	(0)
2019–2020	Podrinje Janja		
2020	Mačva Bogatić		
2021	Chennai City	13	(0)
2021	Mačva Bogatić		
2022	Rađevac		
2022–2023	Paskovac		
2024-	Vidojevica Lešnica		
- * Club domestic league appearances and goals as of 19:44, 25 March 2021 (UTC)

Vladimir Molerović (Serbian: Владимир Молеровић; born 14 April 1992) is a Serbian professional footballer who plays as a defensive midfielder.

== Career ==
On 4 December 2020, Molerović joined I-League side Chennai City. He made his debut on 9 January 2021, in a 2–1 win over Gokulam Kerala.
