= 2010 Future Champions Tournament =

Youth football tournament

The 2010 Future Champions Tournament is an elite under seventeen age-group football competition for leading Club teams from around the world, held in the Brazilian city of Belo Horizonte.

The competition in 2010 featured twelve teams from South America, Central America, North America, Africa, and Europe and took place between December 13 – 19.

== Participants ==
- (Mexico) Club América
- (Brazil) Clube Atlético Mineiro
- (Spain) FC Barcelona
- (Brazil) CR Vasco da Gama
- (Brazil) Cruzeiro EC
- (Brazil) SC Corinthians
- (Uruguay) CA Peñarol
- (United States) D.C. United
- (England) Everton F.C.
- (France) Paris Saint-Germain
- C.F. Universidad de Chile
- (South Africa) Mamelodi Sundowns

== Venues ==
The two venues chosen for the tournament were:

| Uni-BH | Baleião |
|---|---|
| 19.972885°S 43.962768°W | 19.928567°S 43.902955°W |

== Group stage ==
=== Group A ===
13/12/2010

| Atlético Mineiro (Brazil) | 1–0 | Mamelodi Sundowns (South Africa) |
|---|---|---|
| Vinicius |

14/12/2010

| Atlético Mineiro (Brazil) | 1–0 | Universidad de Chile |

15/12/2010

| Universidad de Chile | 1–1 | Mamelodi Sundowns (South Africa) |

=== Group B ===
13/12/2010

| Cruzeiro (Brazil) | 1–0 | Barcelona (Spain) |

14/12/2010

| Peñarol (Uruguay) | 0–2 | Barcelona (Spain) |
|---|---|---|
| | | Dongou; Dongou |

15/12/2010

| Cruzeiro (Brazil) | 3–1 | Peñarol (Uruguay) |

=== Group C ===
13/12/2010

| Corinthians (Brazil) | 0–2 | Everton (England) |
|---|---|---|
| | | Forrester; Hope |

14/12/2010

| Corinthians (Brazil) | 1–1 | America (Mexico) |

15/12/2010

| America (Mexico) | 0–4 | Everton (England) |
|---|---|---|
| | | Hammar; Forrester; Forrester; Thomas |

=== Group D ===
13/12/2010

| Vasco da Gama (Brazil) | 2–0 | PSG (France) |

14/12/2010

| D.C. United (United States) | 1–4 | PSG (France) |

15/12/2010

| Vasco da Gama (Brazil) | 4–0 | D.C. United (United States) |

== Other games ==
13/12/2010

| Universidad de Chile | 0–1 | Peñarol (Uruguay) |

13/12/2010

| America (Mexico) | 2–2 | D.C. United (United States) |
|---|---|---|
| | | Dainkeh; Foss |

14/12/2010

| Mamelodi Sundowns (South Africa) | 0–0 | Cruzeiro (Brazil) |

14/12/2010

| Everton (England) | 1–3 | Vasco da Gama (Brazil) |
|---|---|---|
| Hope |

15/12/2010

| Atlético Mineiro (Brazil) | 2–1 | Barcelona (Spain) |
|---|---|---|
| | | Babunski |

15/12/2010

| Corinthians (Brazil) | 2–0 | PSG (France) |

== Knockout stage ==
=== Playoffs ===
18/12/2010
11th place playoff

| Peñarol (Uruguay) | 2–3 | America (Mexico) |

18/12/2010
9th place playoff

| Universidad de Chile | 2–1 | D.C. United (United States) |

18/12/2010
7th place playoff

| Barcelona (Spain) | 0–4 | Corinthians (Brazil) |

18/12/2010
5th place playoff

| Mamelodi Sundowns (South Africa) | 2–1 | PSG (France) |

18/12/2010
3rd place playoff

| Vasco da Gama (Brazil) | 1–1 (penalty shootout: 5–4) | Everton (England) |

=== Semi-finals ===
17/12/2010

| Atlético Mineiro (Brazil) | 1–0 | (England) Everton |

17/12/2010

| Cruzeiro (Brazil) | 2–0 | (Brazil) Vasco daa Gama |

=== Final ===
18/12/2010

| Cruzeiro (Brazil) | 0–0 (penalty shootout: 3–5) | Atlético Mineiro (Brazil) |
