= 2019–20 Goa Professional League =

Goa Professional League
- Season: 2019–20
- Champions: Sporting Clube de Goa and Churchill Brothers; 5th GPL title each 5th and 8th Goan title
- Relegated: None
- Matches played: 106
- Goals scored: 350 (3.3 per match)
- Top goalscorer: Marcus Masceranhas (14 Goals)

The 2019–20 Goa Professional League is the 22nd season of the Goa Professional League, the top football league in the Indian state of Goa, since its establishment 1996. The league season began on 1 October 2019. SESA Football Academy was promoted to the premier division and they replaced FC Bardez, who were relegated at the end of the previous campaign. The league matches were played at the Duler Stadium and Navelim Football Ground.

Sporting Clube de Goa and Churchill Brothers were declared joint winners of GPL as the 13 remaining games could not be played due to the COVID-19 pandemic and the remaining teams wouldn't have topped the league even if they had played.

== Teams ==
Team	City/Town
Calangute Association	Calangute
Churchill Brothers	Salcete
Corps of Signal	Navelim
Dempo	Panaji
FC Goa Reserves	Panaji
Guardian Angel F.C.	Curchorem
Panjim Footballers	Panaji
Salgaocar	Vasco da Gama
SESA Football Academy	Sirsaim
Sporting Clube de Goa	Panaji
Vasco	Vasco da Gama
Velsao Sports & Cultural Club	Velsao

=== Managers and foreign players ===
Team	Manager	Player 1	Player 2	Player 3	Player 4	Player 5	Player 6
Calangute Association	(India) Charles Dias						
Corps of Signal	(India) Eban Mesquita						
Churchill Brothers	(Ghana) Edward Ansah	(Trinidad and Tobago) Willis Plaza	(Trinidad and Tobago) Radanfah Abu Bakr	(Spain) Joaquín García	(Ghana) Kalif Alhassan		
Dempo	(India) Samir Naik						
FC Goa	(Spain) Sergio Lobera						
Guardian Angel	(India) Shekar Kerkar	(Ghana) Musha Bambatelli	(Ghana) Mohammed Yakubu				
Panjim Footballers	(India) Shekar Kerkar						
Salgaocar	(India) Levino Pereira						
Sporting Clube de Goa	(India) Francisco Vaz	(Nigeria) Philip Odogwu					
Sesa Football Academy	(Spain) Eduard Batlle Basart						
Vasco	(India) Micky Fernandes	(Nigeria) Olumide Adewale Olowolagba	(Ivory Coast) Bema Coulibaly				
Velsao Sports & Cultural Club	(India) Ajay Acharya	(Ivory Coast) Usman Karamoko	(Nigeria) Smart Smith Ebho				

== Standings ==
Pos	Team	Pld	W	D	L	GF	GA	GD	Pts	Qualification or relegation
1	Sporting Goa	20	13	5	2	43	10	+33	44	Champions
2	Dempo	21	11	8	2	45	21	+24	41	
3	Churchill Brothers	17	11	4	2	46	14	+32	37	Champions
4	Salgaocar	21	9	8	4	36	20	+16	35	
5	FC Goa Reserves	18	9	4	5	36	20	+16	31	
6	Panjim Footballers	22	8	3	11	30	41	−11	27	
7	Guardian Angel	22	8	3	11	27	49	−22	27	
8	Calangute Association	19	5	5	9	15	27	−12	20	
9	Vasco	22	5	5	12	22	41	−19	20	
10	Corps of Signal	19	5	2	12	16	37	−21	17	
11	SESA Football Academy	17	3	6	8	15	23	−8	15	
12	Velsao Sports & Cultural Club	20	4	3	13	19	47	−28	15	

Rules for classification: 1) points; 2) goal difference; 3) number of goals scored

== Matches ==
=== Round 1 ===
1 October 2019	Calangute Association	2-2	Vasco	Mapusa
				Stadium: Duler Stadium

2 October 2019	Dempo	2-0	SESA Football Academy	Mapusa
	Nickson Castanha 63'; Joaquim A branches 84'	Report		Stadium: Duler Stadium

3 October 2019	Sporting Clube de Goa	2-0	Velsao SCC	Mapusa
	Philip Odogwu 61'; Gautam Dias 90'	Report		Stadium: Duler Stadium

4 October 2019	FC Goa	Cancelled	Panjim Footballers	Mapusa
				Stadium: Duler Stadium

5 October 2019	Salgaocar F.C.	2-0	Corps of Signals	Mapusa
				Stadium: Duler Stadium

7 October 2019	Guardian Angel SC	0-5	Churchill Brothers	Benaulim
				Stadium: Navelim Stadium

=== Round 2 ===
7 October 2019	Panjim Footballers	0-3	Calangute Association	Mapusa
		Report	Malik Mulla 37'; Domnic Fernandes 40'; Daryl Costa 69'	Stadium: Duler Stadium

8 October 2019	Sporting Clube de Goa	2-0	Dempo S.C.	Mapusa
				Stadium: Duler Stadium

9 October 2019	FC Goa	3-0	Corps of Signals	Mapusa
		Report		Stadium: Duler Stadium

10 October 2019	Sesa Football Academy	2-1	Salgaocar F.C.	Mapusa
	Kunal Salgaonkar 89'; Olvin Cardozo 90'	Report	Devendra Murgaonkar 86'	Stadium: Duler Stadium

11 October 2019	Vasco S.C.	1-2	Guardian Angel SC	Mapusa
				Stadium: Duler Stadium

12 October 2019	Churchill Brothers	3-0	Velsao SCC	Mapusa
	Willis Plaza 61'; Jovel Martins 66'; Shurbert Pereira 83'	Report		Stadium: Duler Stadium

=== Round 3 ===
13 October 2019	Salgaocar F.C.	0-0	Sporting Clube de Goa	Mapusa
		Report		Stadium: Duler Stadium

14 October 2019	Calangute Association	1-0	Corps of Signals	Mapusa
	Daryl Costa 45'	Report		Stadium: Duler Stadium

15 October 2019	Dempo S.C.	6-0	Velsao SCC	Mapusa
		Report		Stadium: Duler Stadium

16 October 2019	Guardian Angel SC	1-0	Panjim Footballers	Benaulim
	Aslon Oliveira 73'	Report		Stadium: Navelim Stadium

17 October 2019	Vasco S.C.	0-1	Churchill Brothers	Mapusa
		Report	Clencio Pinto 71'	Stadium: Duler Stadium

18 October 2019	FC Goa	1-1	SESA Football Academy	Mapusa
	Hayden Fernandes 50'	Report	Richard Cardoz 67'	Stadium: Duler Stadium

=== Round 4 ===
19 October 2019	Corps of Signals	0-0	Guardian Angel SC	Mapusa
		Report		Stadium: Duler Stadium

20 October 2019	Panjim Footballers	0-5	Churchill Brothers	Mapusa
		Report		Stadium: Duler Stadium

21 October 2019	Vasco	4-3	Velsao SCC	Mapusa
		Report		Stadium: Duler Stadium

22 October 2019	Sesa Football Academy	0-0	Calangute Association	Mapusa
		Report		Stadium: Duler Stadium

24 October 2019	Dempo	3-2	Salgaocar	Mapusa
		Report		Stadium: Duler Stadium

=== Round 5 ===
27 October 2019	Guardian Angel	1-1	SESA Football Academy	Mapusa
		Report		Stadium: Duler Stadium

28 October 2019	Sporting Clube de Goa	0-0	Calangute Association	Mapusa
		Report		Stadium: Duler Stadium

29 October 2019	FC Goa	0-1	Dempo	Mapusa
		Report		Stadium: Duler Stadium

30 October 2019	Salgaocar	2-0	Dempo	Verna
		Report		Stadium: Nagoa Ground

31 October 2019	Vasco	0-3	Panjim Footballers	Mapusa
		Report		Stadium: Duler Stadium

=== Round 6 ===
1 November 2019	Dempo	4-0	Calangute Association	Mapusa
		Report		Stadium: Duler Stadium

2 November 2019	Sporting Clube de Goa	2-0	Guardian Angel	Mapusa
		Report		Stadium: Duler Stadium

3 November 2019	SESA Football Academy	0-0	Churchill Brothers	Mapusa
		Report		Stadium: Duler Stadium

4 November 2019	Corps of Signals	3-2	Vasco	Mapusa
		Report		Stadium: Duler Stadium

5 November 2019	Panjim Footballers	3-2	Velsao SCC	Mapusa
		Report		Stadium: Duler Stadium

6 November 2019	Salgaocar	1-1	FC Goa	Verna
		Report		Stadium: Nagoa Ground

=== Round 7 ===
7 November 2019	Churchill Brothers	2-3	Sporting Clube de Goa	Verna
		Report		Stadium: Nagoa Ground

7 November 2019	Vasco	0-0	SESA Football Academy	Mapusa
		Report		Stadium: Duler Stadium

8 November 2019	Panjim Footballers	0-1	Corps of Signals	Mapusa
		Report		Stadium: Duler Stadium

10 November 2019	FC Goa	0-1	Velsao SCC	Mapusa
		Report		Stadium: Duler Stadium

11 November 2019	Calangute Association	2-1	Salgaocar	Mapusa
		Report		Stadium: Duler Stadium

12 November 2019	Guardian Angel	4-0	Dempo	Navelim
		Report		Stadium: Rosary Ground

=== Round 8 ===
12 November 2019	Sporting Clube de Goa	3-0	Panjim Footballers	Mapusa
		Report		Stadium: Duler Stadium

== Top scorers ==
Rank	Player	Club	Goals
1	(India) Marcus Masceranhas	Sporting Goa	14
2	(Trinidad and Tobago) Willis Plaza	Churchill Brothers	11
	(India) Clencio Pinto	Churchill Brothers	11
4	(India) Aaren D'Silva	FC Goa	10
	(India) Suraj Hadonkar	Dempo	10
	(Nigeria) Chukwuemeka Philip Odogwu	Sporting Goa	10
