= Fernando Santiago Varela =

Spanish football manager

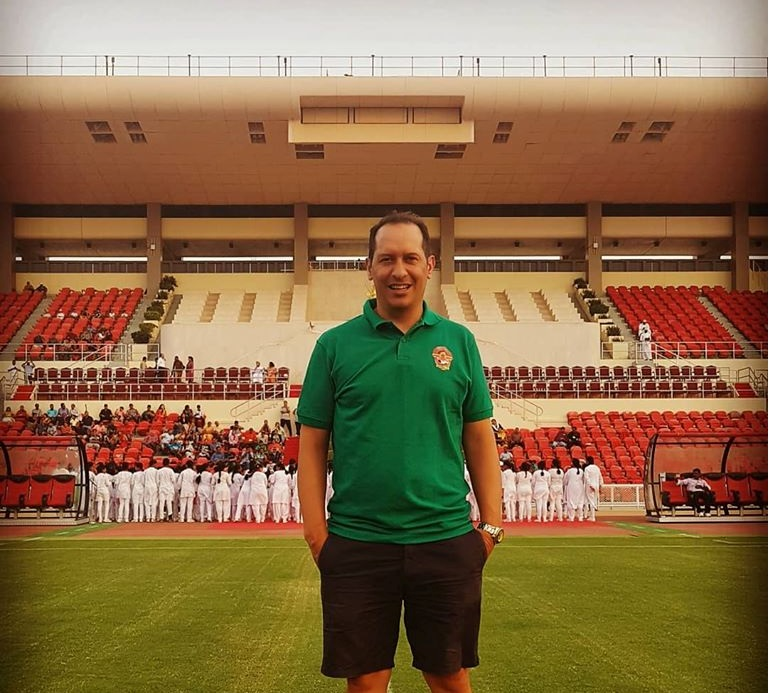
- Varela at the Sultan Qaboos Sports Complex

Personal information
- Full name: Fernando Andrés Santiago Varela
- Date of birth: 4 June 1973 (age 53)
- Place of birth: Mar del Plata, Argentina
- Position: Defender

Managerial career
- Years: Team
- 2011–2012: Tecnofútbol (Youth)
- 2012–2017: Tecnofútbol
- 2017–2018: Gokulam Kerala
- 2019–2020: Gokulam Kerala
- 2020–2021: Churchill Brothers
- 2021–2022: Sreenidi Deccan
- 2022–2023: Churchill Brothers
- 2023–2024: Bengaluru United
- 2024–2025: Abu Muslim
- 2025–2026: SC de Goa
- 2026–: Dhaka Mohammedan

Fernando Andrés Santiago Varela (born 4 June 1973) is an Argentine-born Spanish football coach.

== Coaching career ==
Fernando Varela is a UEFA Pro Licence holder. before joining Gokulam. He is the author of the book Futbol Inteligente. In 2018 he was appointed as the head coach of Indian club Gokulam Kerala and won the Kerala Premier League, as well as Durand Cup season later. On 16 June 2020, he left Gokulam due to salary issues and the I-League performance.

=== Churchill Brothers ===
After his successful spell with Gokulam Kerala, he moved to another I-League side Churchill Brothers in September 2020. Under his guidance, Churchill emerged as the runners-up of the 2020–21 I-League with 29 points. Although Churchill winning against Punjab, Gokulam Kerala were crowned champions courtesy of a better head-to-head record.

=== Sreenidi Deccan ===
In 20 April 2021, Varela was appointed as the head coach of Sreenidi Deccan, one of the new I-League entrants.

=== Bengaluru United ===
On 13 March 2023, it was officially announced that he was appointed as the head coach of Bengaluru United.

=== Sporting CG ===
On October 17, 2025, it was officially announced by Indian club Sporting CG that they had hired Varela as head coach.

== Statistics ==
As of January 2025

Team	From	To	Record				
Team	From	To	G	W	D	L	Win %
Gokulam Kerala	1 June 2019	16 June 2020	20	11	4	5	55.00
Churchill Brothers	23 September 2020	27 March 2021	15	8	5	2	53.33
Sreenidi Deccan	20 April 2021	13 June 2022	18	9	5	4	50.00
Churchill Brothers	December 2022	February 2023	6	2	3	1	33.33
Bengaluru United	February 2023	August 2023	19	12	3	4	63.16
Total			71	37	19	15	52.11

== Honours ==
Gokulam Kerala

- Kerala Premier League: 2017–18
- Durand Cup: 2019

Churchill Brothers

- I-League runners-up: 2020–21

FC Bengaluru United

- Stafford Challenge Cup: 2023
