= Demir Avdić =

Serbian footballer

Personal information
- Full name: Demir Avdić
- Date of birth: 10 October 1990 (age 36)
- Place of birth: Novi Pazar, Serbia, Yugoslavia
- Height: 1.88 m (6 ft 2 in)
- Position: Forward

Youth career
- –2009: Novi Pazar

Senior career*
Years	Team	Apps	(Gls)
2010–2012	Josanica		
2012–2013	Pobeda Belosevac		
2013–2014	Josanica		
2014	Sinđelić Niš		
2014–2015	Ibar Rožaje		
2015	Sloga Sjenica		
2015	Götene IF	10	(6)
2015–2016	Mqabba		
2016	Zlatibor Čajetina		
2016–2017	Trepça '89		
2017	Götene IF	12	(6)
2018	Drina Zvornik		
2018	Wien Floridsdorf	15	(5)
2019	Mauerwerk	7	(2)
2019–2020	Sloga Sjenica		
2020	ASK Ybbs	0	(0)
2020	Mačva 1929		
2020–2021	Chennai City	11	(2)
2022	SC Unterpullendorf	15	(5)
2022	FavAC Wien	14	(5)
2023–	BANE 1931		
- * Club domestic league appearances and goals

Demir Avdić (Serbian: Демир Авдић; born 10 October 1990) is a Serbian professional footballer who plays as a forward.

== Career ==
Avdić had two different spells at Swedish side Götene IF. In January 2016 he joined Maltese second-tier side Mqabba. He then had a stint at Bosnian outfit Drina Zvornik, whom he left after a dispute over money.

On 4 December 2020, Avdić joined I-League side Chennai City. He made his debut on 9 January 2021, in a 2–1 win over Gokulam Kerala.
