= Clayvin Zúñiga =

Honduran footballer (born 1991)

Personal information
- Full name: Clayvin Julián Zúñiga Berná
- Date of birth: 29 March 1991 (age 35)
- Place of birth: Puerto Cortés, Honduras
- Height: 1.78 m (5 ft 10 in)
- Position: Forward

Team information
- Current team: Marathón
- Number: 9

Senior career*
Years	Team	Apps	(Gls)
2011–2012	Real España	12	(0)
2012–2014	Deportes Savio	51	(4)
2014–2015	Real Sociedad	12	(1)
2016–2020	Municipal Limeño	111	(40)
2021	Churchill Brothers	14	(8)
2021–2022	FAS	35	(6)
2022–2025	Marathón	100	(30)
2025	Municipal Limeño	18	(3)

International career^{‡}
2022–	Honduras	1	(0)
- * Club domestic league appearances and goals as of 10 November 2023 ‡ National team caps and goals as of 21 August 2023

Clayvin Julián Zúñiga Bernárdez (born 29 March 1991) is a Honduran professional footballer who plays as a forward for Liga Nacional club Marathón.

== Club career ==
=== RCD España ===
Zuniga began his professional career in the Liga Nacional de Honduras side Real C.D. España, where he played from 2011 to 2012, making 12 league appearances. With España, he won the 2011–12 Honduran Liga Nacional.

=== Deportes Savio ===
He later joined another Honduran club, Deportes Savio F.C. in 2012, making 51 league appearances and scoring 4 goals before moving to C.D. Real Sociedad in 2014.

=== Municipal Limeño ===
His most notable stint in club football was for El Salvador-based side Municipal Limeño, where he played 102 matches, scoring 37 goals. He won the Segunda División de El Salvador in 2016 with the club.

=== Churchill Brothers ===
On 20 September 2020, he signed for Indian I-League side Churchill Brothers SC.

"It was a difficult decision. I played for four years in El Salvador and three years in Honduras. After this, I wanted a change in my life. This opportunity came, so I spoke to my family that I want to go (to India). They said 'if you want, okay, go after this,' I took the decision to come here. After spending four years in El Salvador I wanted to see football in a different country and different continent and that's why I took this decision."

— — Clayvin Zuniga, on his move to India and joining Churchill Brothers SC.

He made his debut on 10 January 2021 against Indian Arrows in a 5–2 win. He scored the hat-trick in that debut match.

With Churchill, he scored a total of eight goals in 14 league matches, as the club finished as runners-up of the 2020–21 I-League, finishing behind Gokulam Kerala.

=== C.D. FAS ===
In June 2021, Zuniga moved to El Salvador and signed with the Primera División de Fútbol de El Salvador side C.D. FAS.

== International career ==
Zúñiga was called up for the Honduras national under-20 football team in 2010. He has also represented the Honduras national under-23 football team.

He represented Honduras at the 2011 CONCACAF U-20 Championship, where he appeared in 3 matches as Honduras reached the Quarter Finals before losing to Panama U20.

Zúñiga made his debut for the Honduras national football team on 27 September 2022 in a friendly game against Guatemala.

== Honours ==
Real C.D. España

- Honduran Liga Nacional (Regular Season): 2011–12

Municipal Limeño

- Primera División de Fútbol de El Salvador (Apertura & Clausura): 2015–16

Churchill Brothers

- I-League: runner-up 2020–21
