= Elvedin Škrijelj =

Serbian footballer

Personal information
- Date of birth: 19 February 1990 (age 36)
- Place of birth: Novi Pazar, SFR Yugoslavia
- Height: 1.91 m (6 ft 3 in)
- Position: Centre-back

Youth career
- Novi Pazar

Senior career*
Years	Team	Apps	(Gls)
2010–2012	Novi Pazar	69	(2)
2012	Mladost Lučani	7	(0)
2013	BASK	10	(0)
2013–2014	Novi Pazar	0	(0)
2013–2014	→ Jošanica (loan)	20	(2)
2014	Ibar Rožaje		
2015	Jošanica	11	(3)
2015	Råslätts	3	(0)
2016	Sloga Sjenica		
2017	Jošanica	12	(0)
2017	Novi Pazar 1928		
2018–2020	Tutin		
2020–2021	Chennai City	11	(3)
- * Club domestic league appearances and goals as of 18:44, 25 March 2021 (UTC)

Elvedin Škrijelj (Serbian Cyrillic: Елведин Шкријељ; Albanian: Elvedin Shkreli; born 19 February 1990) is a Serbian professional footballer who plays as a centre-back, most recently for Chennai City in the I-League.
