= Hamza Kheir =

Lebanese footballer (born 1993)

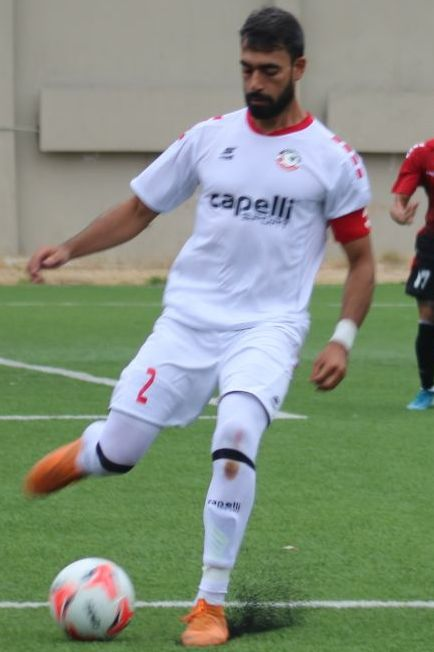
- Kheir with Salam Zgharta in 2020

Personal information
- Full name: Hamza Radwan Kheir
- Date of birth: 28 June 1993 (age 33)
- Place of birth: Miniyeh, Lebanon
- Height: 1.84 m (6 ft 0 in)
- Position: Centre-back

Youth career
- 2007–2012: Shabab Tripoli

Senior career*
Years	Team	Apps	(Gls)
2012–2014	Shabab Tripoli		
2014–2020	Salam Zgharta	79	(2)
2020–2021	Churchill Brothers	12	(0)
2021–2023	Ahed	3	(0)
2021–2022	→ Sreenidi Deccan (loan)	13	(0)
2022–2023	→ Shabab Sahel (loan)	20	(0)
2023–2024	Safa	8	(0)
Total		135	(2)
- * Club domestic league appearances and goals

Hamza Radwan Kheir (Arabic: حمزة رضوان خير; born 28 June 1993) is a Lebanese former professional footballer who played as a defender.

== Career ==
=== Salam Zgharta ===
Kheir began his Lebanese Premier League career at Salam Zgharta in 2014, becoming the team's captain and playing 79 league games in six years.

=== Churchill Brothers ===
On 15 November 2020, Kheir joined I-League club Churchill Brothers on a one-year contract. He made his debut on 10 January 2021, in a 5–2 away win over Indian Arrows. On 19 January, Kheir assisted the lone goal of the game, helping his side win 1–0 away from home to Punjab; he was named man of the match.

Kheir played 12 league games, helping his side finish runners-up in the league; he was nominated Best Defender of the 2020–21 season.

=== Ahed ===
Kheir returned to Lebanon on 13 June 2021, signing for Ahed in the Lebanese Premier League.

==== Loan to Sreenidi Deccan ====
On 31 December 2021, Kheir moved back to India ahead of the 2021–22 I-League, signing for Sreenidi Deccan, one of the new I-League entrants. He made his debut for the club, on 3 March 2022, against TRAU in a 3–1 win. Having played 13 games, Kheir helped his side finish their maiden league campaign in third place.

==== Loan to Shabab Sahel ====
In August 2022, Kheir joined Shabab Sahel on a one-year loan from Ahed. He played 20 league games.

=== Safa ===
On 25 July 2023, the transfer market deadline day, Kheir signed for Safa on a three-year contract.

== Honours ==
Churchill Brothers

- I-League runner-up: 2020–21

Ahed

- Lebanese Premier League: 2021–22
- Lebanese Federation Cup: 2023
- Lebanese Elite Cup: 2022; runner-up: 2021

Individual

- I-League Best Defender: 2020–21
