= Clencio Pinto =

Indian footballer

Personal information
- Date of birth: 8 February 1994 (age 32)
- Place of birth: Goa, India
- Position: Midfielder

Team information
- Current team: Churchill Brothers FC Goa
- Number: 7

Youth career
- 2011–2014: Dempo

Senior career*
Years	Team	Apps	(Gls)
2011–2014	Dempo	0	(0)
2011–2012	→ Margao (loan)		
2012–2013	→ Wilfred Leisure (loan)		
2015	Cavelossim		
2016–2017	Salgaocar	1	(0)
2018–	Churchill Brothers FC Goa	11	(0)
- * Club domestic league appearances and goals as of 18 February 2020

Clencio Pinto is an Indian professional footballer who plays as a midfielder for Churchill Brothers in the I-League.

== Career ==
Born in Goa, Pinto was part of the Dempo youth system, playing with their under-19s from 2011 to 2014. While with Dempo, Pinto joined both Margao and Wilfred Leisure on loan in the Goa Professional League to gain senior experience, before appearing for Dempo in the same league during the 2013–14 season. In 2015, after leaving Dempo, Pinto played in the Goa Professional League with Cavelossim.

On 23 April 2016, during the last game of the I-League season, Pinto made his professional debut for Salgaocar against Sporting Goa. He started the match and played the whole first half as Salgaocar lost 3–0.

== Career statistics ==
As of 7 May 2016

Club	Season	League			League Cup		Domestic Cup		Continental		Total	
Club	Season	Division	Apps	Goals	Apps	Goals	Apps	Goals	Apps	Goals	Apps	Goals
Salgaocar	2015–16	I-League	1	0	—	—	—	—	—	—	1	0
Career total			1	0	0	0	0	0	0	0	1	0
