= Quan Gomes =

Indian footballer (born 1996)

Personal information
- Date of birth: 5 January 1996 (age 30)
- Place of birth: Majorda, Goa, India
- Height: 1.77 m (5 ft 9 1/2 in)
- Position: Central midfielder

Youth career
- Fransa-Pax FC
- Betalbatim SC
- Salgaocar
- Dempo
- Sporting Goa

Senior career*
Years	Team	Apps	(Gls)
2019–2023	Churchill Brothers	43	(0)
- * Club domestic league appearances and goals as of 23:21, 22 February 2023 (UTC)

Quan Gomes (born 5 January 1996) is an Indian professional footballer who plays as a central midfielder.

== Career ==
Quan has represented Fransa-Pax FC U-14 and Betalbatim sporting club U-14, before joining Salgaocar F.C. U-16 where he got an opportunity to play in Thailand after winning the India leg of the Manchester United Premier Cup Under-15 competition. He also played for Guardian Angel SC, Curchorem in the GFA First Division League. Quan had previously for Dempo S.C. U-18 and also in the Goa Professional League for Vasco S.C.

He made his professional debut for the Churchill Brothers against Punjab F.C. on 1 December 2019, He was brought in the 90th minutes as Churchill Brothers won 3–0.

== Career statistics ==
=== Club ===
As of 22 February 2023

Club	Season	League			Cup		AFC		Total	
Club	Season	Division	Apps	Goals	Apps	Goals	Apps	Goals	Apps	Goals
Churchill Brothers	2019–20	I-League	13	0	0	0	–		13	0
Churchill Brothers	2020–21	I-League	10	0	0	0	–		10	0
Churchill Brothers	2021–22	I-League	12	0	0	0	–		12	0
Churchill Brothers	2022–23	I-League	8	0	0	0	–		8	0
Churchill Brothers	Total		43	0	0	0	0	0	43	0
Career total			43	0	0	0	0	0	43	0
