= Bryce Miranda =

Indian footballer (born 1999)

Personal information
- Full name: Bryce Brian Miranda
- Date of birth: 23 September 1999 (age 27)
- Place of birth: Mumbai, India
- Height: 1.75 m (5 ft 9 in)
- Position: Winger

Team information
- Current team: Chennaiyin

Youth career
- Mumbai

Senior career*
Years	Team	Apps	(Gls)
2017–2018	Union Bank	11	(2)
2018–2019	Goa B	1	(0)
2019–2020	Income Tax	15	(3)
2020–2022	Churchill Brothers	32	(2)
2022–2025	Kerala Blasters	12	(0)
2024	→ Punjab (loan)	2	(0)
2025	→ Inter Kashi (loan)	13	(1)
2025–2026	Diamond Harbour	5	(0)
2026–	Chennaiyin	3	(0)

International career^{‡}
2021–2023	India U23	5	(0)
- * Club domestic league appearances and goals as of 26 October 2026 ‡ National team caps and goals as of 28 September 2023

Bryce Brian Miranda (born 23 September 1999) is an Indian professional footballer who plays as a winger for Chennaiyin.

== Club career ==
=== Youth and early career ===
Born in Mumbai, Bryce started his schooling at Don Bosco School where he also played for the school team. He represented all age group teams of Mumbai FC up to U-18 level. Later he played for Union Bank FC in different tournaments. In 2018, Bryce was signed by FC Goa and was put into their developmental side. A year later, he joined Income Tax FC where he had a breakout season, scoring three goals and providing 10 assists in the 2019–2020 Mumbai Elite division.

=== Churchill Brothers ===
On 22 November 2020, Bryce signed for the I-League side Churchill Brothers. On 10 January 2021, Bryce made his professional debut for Churchill Brothers in the I-league match against Indian Arrows. He started in every match during the season, bagging a goal and three assists. During the 2021–22 I-League, Bryce made 16 appearances and made one assist for the club.

=== Kerala Blasters ===
On 15 June 2022, Indian Super League club Kerala Blasters FC announced the signing of Bryce from Churchill Brothers FC for an undisclosed transfer fee. He signed a multi-year deal, which would keep him with the club until 2026. Bryce made his debut for the Blasters on 28 October 2022 in a 2–0 loss against Mumbai City FC by coming as a substitute for Adrian Luna in the 92nd minute. On 26 December 2022, he made his first assist in Indian Super League, where he provided assist to Sandeep Singh's goal in the 86th minute, after coming as a substitute in the 83rd minute helping the Blasters in a 1–0 win against Odisha FC. On 29 January 2023, Bryce made his first start for the Blasters in the season against NorthEast United FC and provided an assist for the Dimitrios Diamantakos' goal in the 42nd minute, helping in a 2–0 win.

=== Punjab FC ===
On January 31, 2024, Miranda joined Punjab on loan for the remainder of the season.

=== Inter Kashi ===
On January 16, 2024, Miranda joined Kashi on loan for the remainder of the season.

== International career ==
Miranda was called up for the India's U-23 camp for the 2022 AFC U-23 Asian Cup qualifiers, which was held at UAE in October 2021. He made his debut on 30 October 2021 against Kyrgyzstan, coming in as a substitute for Vikram Pratap Singh.

== Career statistics ==
=== Club ===
As of 27 April 2025

Club	Season	League			Cup		AFC		Total	
Club	Season	Division	Apps	Goals	Apps	Goals	Apps	Goals	Apps	Goals
Goa B	2018–19	I-League 2nd Division	1	0	0	0	–		1	0
Churchill Brothers	2020–21	I-League	15	1	0	0	–		15	1
Churchill Brothers	2021–22	I-League	17	1	0	0	–		17	1
Churchill Brothers	Total		32	2	0	0	0	0	32	2
Kerala Blasters	2022–23	Indian Super League	12	0	2 (Note: Appearance(s) in Super Cup)	0	–		14	0
Kerala Blasters	2023–24	Indian Super League	0	0	4 (Note: Appearance(s) in Durand Cup)	0	–		4	0
Kerala Blasters	2024–25	Indian Super League	0	0	2	0	–		2	0
Kerala Blasters	Total		12	0	8	0	0	0	20	0
Punjab (loan)	2023–24	Indian Super League	2	0	0	0	–		2	0
Inter Kashi (loan)	2024–25	I-League	13	1	2	0	–		15	1
Career total			60	3	10	0	0	0	70	3
