= Lamgoulen Hangshing =

Indian footballer

Personal information
- Full name: Lamgoulen Gou Hangshing
- Date of birth: 5 October 1997 (age 29)
- Place of birth: Manipur, India
- Height: 1.68 m (5 ft 6 in)
- Position: Right-back

Team information
- Current team: SC Delhi
- Number: 13

Senior career*
Years	Team	Apps	(Gls)
2017–2018	Bengaluru B	9	(3)
2018–2025	Churchill Brothers	100	(5)
2025–	SC Delhi	0	(0)
- * Club domestic league appearances and goals as of 10 December 2022

Lamgoulen Gou Hangshing (born 5 October 1997) is an Indian professional footballer who plays as a defender for Indian Super League club SC Delhi.

== Career ==
Hangshing made his professional debut for the Churchill Brothers against Punjab F.C. on 28 October 2018, He played till 52nd minute as Churchill Brothers drew 0–0.

== Career statistics ==
=== Club ===
As of 10 December 2022

Club	Season	League			Cup		Other		AFC		Total	
Club	Season	Division	Apps	Goals	Apps	Goals	Apps	Goals	Apps	Goals	Apps	Goals
Bengaluru B	2017–18	I-League 2nd Division	9	3	0	0	—		—		9	3
Churchill Brothers	2018–19	I-League	9	0	0	0	—		—		9	0
Churchill Brothers	2019–20	I-League	7	0	0	0	—		—		7	0
Churchill Brothers	2020–21	I-League	3	0	0	0	—		—		3	0
Churchill Brothers	2021–22	I-League	18	0	0	0	—		—		18	0
Churchill Brothers	2022–23	I-League	7	1	0	0	3 (Note: Appearance(s) in Baji Rout Cup)	0	—		10	1
Churchill Brothers	Churchill Brothers total		44	1	0	0	3	0	0	0	47	1
Career total			53	4	0	0	3	0	0	0	56	4
