= Kapil Hoble =

Indian footballer (born 1998)

Personal information
- Date of birth: 19 May 1998 (age 28)
- Place of birth: Goa, India
- Position: Midfielder

Team information
- Current team: Churchill Brothers
- Number: 14

Youth career
- 2014–2017: Dempo U18

Senior career*
Years	Team	Apps	(Gls)
2018–2021	FC Goa	11	(2)
2021–	Churchill Brothers	8	(0)
- * Club domestic league appearances and goals

Kapil Hoble (born 19 May 1998) is an Indian professional footballer who plays as a midfielder for Churchill Brothers.

== Career ==
Hoble played for the under-18 team of Dempo in the 2014–15 edition of the Youth League. A midfielder, he was also employed as a forward the following season. He was later drafted to the senior side and played in the 2015–16 edition of the I-League 2nd Division. He represented home state Goa in the 2017–18 edition of Santosh Trophy.

Hoble moved to FC Goa in 2018 and represented their Reserves side in the I-League 2nd Division and Goa Professional League for a couple of seasons.

=== Churchill Brothers ===
Hoble was signed by Churchill Brothers ahead of the 2021–22 season of the I-League.

== Career statistics ==
As of 11 May 2022

Appearances and goals by club, season and competition
Club	Season	League			Federation Cup		Durand Cup		AFC		Total	
Club	Season	Division	Apps	Goals	Apps	Goals	Apps	Goals	Apps	Goals	Apps	Goals
Churchill Brothers	2021–22	I-League	8	0	0	0	0	0	—	—	8	0
Career total			8	0	0	0	0	0	0	0	8	0
