= Joseph Clemente =

Indian footballer

Personal information
- Date of birth: 11 August 1987 (age 39)
- Place of birth: Goa, India
- Positions: Centre-back; left back

Team information
- Current team: Churchill Brothers
- Number: 4

Youth career
- Rossman Cruz Nagoa
- Margao SC

Senior career*
Years	Team	Apps	(Gls)
2012–2020	Sporting Goa	26	(0)
2017–2018	→ Chennai City (loan)	10	(0)
2021	→ Churchill Brothers (loan)	4	(0)
2021–	Churchill Brothers	17	(0)
- * Club domestic league appearances and goals as of 22:54, 16 December 2022 (UTC)

Joseph Clemente (born 11 August 1987) is an Indian footballer who plays as a defender for Churchill Brothers in the I-League.

== Career ==
=== Sporting Goa ===
Joseph Clemente made his debut for Sporting Goa in the I-League on 9 November 2012 against Mumbai at the Balewadi Sports Complex in a match they lost 3–2 and Joseph Clemente was in starting 11.

== Career statistics ==
=== Club ===
As of 4 March 2022

Club	Season	League			Cup		AFC		Total	
Club	Season	Division	Apps	Goals	Apps	Goals	Apps	Goals	Apps	Goals
Sporting Goa	2012–13	I-League	3	0	0	0	—		3	0
Sporting Goa	2014–15	I-League	12	0	0	0	—		12	0
Sporting Goa	2015–16	I-League	11	0	0	0	—		11	0
Chennai City (loan)	2016–17	I-League	10	0	0	0	—		10	0
Churchill Brothers (loan)	2020–21	I-League	4	0	0	0	—		4	0
Churchill Brothers	2021–22	I-League	2	0	0	0	—		2	0
Career total			42	0	0	0	0	0	42	0
