= Shubert Pereira =

Indian footballer

Personal information
- Full name: Shubert Joanus Pereira
- Date of birth: 7 November 1998 (age 28)
- Place of birth: Goa, India
- Position: Midfielder

Team information
- Current team: Churchill Brothers
- Number: 17

Youth career
- Dempo U18
- Sporting Goa

Senior career*
Years	Team	Apps	(Gls)
2017–2018	Gokulam Kerala	0	(0)
2018–2019	Vasco	0	(0)
2019–	Churchill Brothers	4	(0)
- * Club domestic league appearances and goals as of 21:22, 16 March 2022 (UTC)

Shubert Pereira (born 7 November 1998) is an Indian professional footballer who plays as a midfielder for Churchill Brothers in the I-League.

== Career ==
Shubert Pereira made his professional debut for Churchill Brothers on 10 January 2021 against Indian Arrows as a substitute.

== Career statistics ==
As of 10 January 2021

Appearances and goals by club, season and competition
Club	Season	League			Federation Cup		Durand Cup		AFC		Total	
Club	Season	Division	Apps	Goals	Apps	Goals	Apps	Goals	Apps	Goals	Apps	Goals
Churchill Brothers	2020–21	I-League	1	0	0	0	0	0	—	—	1	0
Career total			1	0	0	0	0	0	0	0	1	0
