= Mateus Costa =

Indian football manager

Personal information
- Full name: Mateus Cupertino Costa
- Date of birth: 1 January 1970 (age 56)
- Place of birth: Goa, India

Team information
- Current team: Pax of Nagoa (head coach)

Managerial career
- Years: Team
- 2012-2015: Dempo
- 2015–2020: Sporting Goa
- 2020-2023: Churchill Brothers
- 2023–Present: Pax of Nagoa

Mateus Cupertino Costa (born 1 January 1970) is the current manager of Goa Professional League club Pax of Nagoa.

== Coaching career ==
On 10 January 2015, it was revealed that Costa had been coaching Sporting Clube de Goa in the Federation Cup after the dismissal Óscar Bruzón. Costa led Sporting Goa to the semi-finals of the Federation Cup where they lost 3–0 to eventual champions, Bengaluru FC.

In 2020, he appointed as new head coach of Churchill Brothers, after the sacked Portuguese manager Bernardo Tavares. After appointing head coach of Churchill in second term in February 2023, he guided the team in 2023 Indian Super Cup.

== Managerial statistics ==
As of 28 February 2015

Team	From	To	Record				
Team	From	To	G	W	D	L	Win %
Sporting Goa	Unknown	Present	12	2	3	7	16.67
Total			12	2	3	7	16.67
