= Mamit Vanlalduatsanga =

Indian footballer

Personal information
- Full name: Mamit Vanlalduatsanga
- Date of birth: 15 December 1996 (age 29)
- Place of birth: Mamit, India
- Height: 1.65 m (5 ft 5 in)
- Position: Left back

Team information
- Current team: Bengaluru United
- Number: 37

Senior career*
| Years | Team | Apps | (Gls) |
| 2018–2019 | Aizawl | 15 | (0) |
| 2019–2023 | Churchill Brothers | | |
| 2023– | Bengaluru United | | |

International career
| 2011–2012 | India U17 | | |
- * Club domestic league appearances and goals

Mamit Vanlalduatsanga (born 15 December 1996) is an Indian professional footballer who plays as a defender.

== Career ==
Mamit made his professional debut for the Aizawl against Shillong Lajong on 28 October 2018. He started and played full match as Aizawl lost 2–1.

== Career statistics ==
As of 15 December 2019

| Club | Season | League | | | Cup | | Continental | | Total | |
| Club | Season | Division | Apps | Goals | Apps | Goals | Apps | Goals | Apps | Goals |
|---|---|---|---|---|---|---|---|---|---|---|
| Aizawl F.C. | 2018–19 | I-League | 15 | 0 | 0 | 0 | — | — | 15 | 0 |
| Churchill Brothers | 2019–20 | I-League | 0 | 0 | 0 | 0 | — | — | 0 | 0 |
| Career total | | | 15 | 0 | 0 | 0 | 0 | 0 | 15 | 0 |
