= List of 2021–22 I-League season roster changes =

2021–22 I-League transfers
- Season: 2021–22 I-League

The following is a list of transfers and squad changes for the 2021–22 I-League. The list includes both pre-season and mid-season transfers.

== Gokulam Kerala FC ==
=== Transfers in ===
| Entry date | Position | No. | Player | Previous club | Fee | Ref. |
|---|---|---|---|---|---|---|
| 21 May 2021 | DF | - | Muhammed Rafi | (India) Bengaluru FC Reserves | None | |
| 7 June 2021 | DF | - | Muhammed Uvais | (India) KSEB Football Team | None | |
| 25 June 2021 | MF | - | Khundongbam Krishnanda | (India) TRAU FC | None | |
| 2 July 2021 | DF | 27 | Takhellambam Deepak | (India) NEROCA | None | |
| 9 July 2021 | GK | 01 | Rakshit Dagar | (India) Sudeva Delhi | None | |
| 16 July 2021 | DF | - | Shoaib Akhtar | (India) NEROCA | None | |
| 23 July 2021 | MF | - | Akbar Khan | (India) NEROCA | None | |
| 13 August 2021 | FW | 22 | Beneston Barretto | (India) Guardian Angel SC | None | |
| 23 August 2021 | DF | 5 | Pawan Kumar | (India) Real Kashmir | None | |
| 25 August 2021 | MF | 6 | Charles Anandraj | (India) Chennai City | None | |
| 26 August 2021 | DF | 15 | (Cameroon) Aminou Bouba | (Cameroon) Eding Sport FC | None | |
| 30 August 2021 | MF | 9 | Sourav K | | None | |
| 31 August 2021 | FW | 19 | (Ghana) Rahim Osumanu | (Ethiopia) Jimma Aba Jifar | None | |
| 3 September 2021 | FW | 13 | (Nigeria) Chisom Chikatara | (Iraq) Naft Maysan | None | |
| 3 November 2021 | DF | - | (India) Shahajaz Thekkan | (India) Kerala blasters Reserves | None | |
| 25 December 2021 | MF | 6 | (India) Sinivasan Pandiyan | (India) Chennaiyin | None | |
| 1 February 2022 | FW | 99 | (Slovenia) Luka Majcen | (India) Bengaluru United | None | |
| 20 February 2022 | FW | - | (Jamaica) Jourdaine Fletcher | (Jamaica) Mount Pleasant | None | |
| 24 March 2022 | MF | - | (Sri Lanka) Ahmed Waseem Razeek | (Sri Lanka) Up Country Lions | None | |

=== Transfers out ===
| Exit date | Position | No. | Player | To club | Fee | Ref. |
|---|---|---|---|---|---|---|
| 14 May 2021 | FW | | (India) Malemngamba Meitei | (India) FC Bengaluru United | None | |
| 14 May 2021 | DF | 27 | (India) Sebastian Thangmuansang | (India) Odisha | None | |
| 18 June 2021 | GK | 01 | (India) Ubaid CK | (India) Sreenidhi FC | None | |
| 30 June 2021 | MF | 13 | (India) Mayakkannan | (India) Sreenidhi FC | None | |
| 1 July 2021 | FW | 27 | (India) Lalromawia | (India) Sreenidhi FC | None | |
| 7 July 2021 | DF | 26 | (India) Deepak Devrani | (India) Chennaiyin | None | |
| 8 July 2021 | MF | 47 | (India) Vincy Barretto | (India) Kerala blasters | Undisclosed fee | |
| 21 July 2021 | MF | 22 | (India) Shibil Muhammed | (India) Sreenidhi FC | None | |
| 23 July 2021 | DF | - | (India) Roshan Singh | (India) TRAU FC | None | |
| 31 July 2021 | DF | 24 | (India) Jestin George | (India) Northeast United FC | None | |
| 20 August 2021 | MF | - | (India) Antony Beautin | (India) Kerala United FC | None | |
| 22 August 2021 | DF | 49 | (Ghana) Mohamed Awal | (India) Sreenidhi FC | None | |
| 22 August 2021 | DF | - | (India) Muhammad Asif | (India) Bhawanipore | None | |
| 22 August 2021 | DF | 15 | (India) Mohamed Salah | (India) Sreenidhi FC | None | |
| 28 August 2021 | DF | 02 | (India) Naocha Singh | (India) Mumbai City | None | |
| 31 August 2021 | FW | 50 | (Ghana) Philip Adjah | (Bangladesh) Rahmatganj MFS | None | |
| 31 August 2021 | FW | 16 | (India) Salman K | (India) Kerala United FC | None | |
| 31 August 2021 | FW | 33 | (Ghana) Denny Antwi | (United Arab Emirates) Al-Taawon | None | |
| 31 August 2021 | DF | 05 | (India) Rowilson Rodrigues | | None | |
| 31 August 2021 | DF | 06 | (India) Ashok Singh | | None | |
| 31 August 2021 | DF | - | (India) Muhammed Rafi | (India) Hyderabad FC | None | |
| 1 September 2021 | MF | - | (India) Akbar Khan | (India) Sudeva Delhi | None | |
| 3 September 2021 | FW | - | (India) Lalliansanga | (India) Aizawl | None | |
| 21 September 2021 | FW | 47 | (India) Rahul KP | (India) Sreenidhi FC | None | |
| 21 September 2021 | GK | - | (India) Shayan Roy | (India) Madan Maharaj FC | None | |
| 1 December 2021 | MF | - | (India) Khundongbam Krishnanda | (India) TRAU FC | None | |
| 1 December 2021 | DF | 02 | (India) Ajin Tom | (India) Muthoot FA | None | |
| 1 March 2022 | Fw | 13 | (Nigeria) Chisom Chikatara | (Nigeria) Abia Warriors FC | None | |

== Churchill Brothers ==
In

| Date | Pos. | Name | From | Fee | Ref. |
|---|---|---|---|---|---|
| 29 June 2021 | MF | (India) Varun Thokchom | (India) NEROCA | None | |
| 26 July 2021 | FW | (Guinea) Sekou Sylla | (Vietnam) Haiphong | None | |
| 20 August 2021 | DF | (Lebanon) Shadi Skaf | (Lebanon) Bourj | None | |
| 21 August 2021 | FW | (India) Afdal Varikkodan | (India) | None | |
| 21 August 2021 | FW | (India) Kapil Hoble | (India) FC Goa | None | |
| 15 September 2021 | MF | (Brazil) Guilherme Escuro | (Brazil) Retrô | None | |
| 27 September 2021 | FW | (India) Faheem Ali | (India) Kerala United FC | None | |
| 28 September 2021 | FW | (India) Aaron Barretto | (India) Salgaocar | None | |
| 11 October 2021 | FW | (Nigeria) Kenneth Ikechukwu | (Bangladesh) Saif SC | None | |
| 29 January 2022 | FW | (Tajikistan) Komron Tursunov | (India) Rajasthan United | None | |

Out

| Exit date | Pos. | Name | To | Fee | Ref. |
|---|---|---|---|---|---|
| 16 June 2021 | FW | (Honduras) Clayvin Zuniga | (El Salvador) FAS | None | |
| 16 June 2021 | FW | (Slovenia) Luka Majcen | (India) Bengaluru United | None | |
| 16 June 2021 | MF | (Ivory Coast) Bazie Armand | (Libya) Abu Salem | None | |
| 16 June 2021 | DF | (Lebanon) Hamza Kheir | (Lebanon) Ahed | None | |
| 4 August 2021 | DF | (India) Suresh Meitei | (India) Army Red | None | |
| 4 July 2021 | GK | (India) Shibinraj Kunniyil | (India) Sreenidi Deccan | None | |
| 4 August 2021 | MF | (India) Fredsan Marshall | (India) Sreenidi Deccan | None | |
| 4 August 2021 | MF | (India) Israil Gurung | | None | |
| 12 January 2022 | DF | (Lebanon) Shadi Skaf | (Lebanon) Nejmeh | None | |

== Sudeva Delhi ==
=== Transfers In ===
| Date | Player | Position | No. | Last Club | Fee | Ref. |
|---|---|---|---|---|---|---|
| 1 August 2021 | (India) Shaiborlang Kharpan | FW | 12 | (India) Kerala Blasters | Free transfer | |
| 1 September 2021 | (India) Akbar Khan | MF | | (India) Gokulam Kerala FC | Free transfer | |

=== Transfers Out ===
| Exit Date | Player | Position | No. | To | Fee | Ref. |
|---|---|---|---|---|---|---|
| 30 March 2021 | (India) Naorem Mahesh Singh | FW | 33 | (India) Kerala Blasters FC | Loan Return | |
| 30 March 2021 | (India) Ajay Singh | FW | 10 | (India) NEROCA | Free transfer | |
| 30 March 2021 | (India) Johny K.v.I Muanpuia | MF | | | Released | |
| 30 March 2021 | (India) Suji Kumar M | MF | | | Released | |
| 30 March 2021 | (India) Amandeep | MF | | | Released | |
| 30 March 2021 | (India) R. Lallawmawma | MF | | | Released | |
| 30 March 2021 | (India) Waris Rashid | MF | | | Released | |
| 30 March 2021 | (India) Gopi Kannan | MF | | | Released | |
| 30 March 2021 | (India) H Lalhmingchhuanga | MF | | | Released | |
| 30 March 2021 | (India) Eddie Fung | MF | | | Released | |
| 30 March 2021 | (India) Wallace J Martins | DF | | | Released | |
| 30 March 2021 | (India) Sanjib Das | MF | | | Released | |
| 30 March 2021 | (India) Anirban Yadav | GK | | | Released | |
| 30 May 2021 | (India) Ayush Chhikara | FW | 33 | (India) Mumbai City FC | Loan Return | |
| 1 July 2021 | (India) Kamal Choudhary | DF | 14 | (India) Rajasthan United FC | Free transfer | |
| 3 July 2021 | (India) Lalramhmunmawia | DF | 39 | (India) Mohammedan | Free transfer | |
| 9 July 2021 | (India) Rakshit Dagar | GK | 40 | (India) Gokulam Kerala FC | Free transfer | |
| 2 August 2021 | (India) Kean Lewis | MF | 8 | (India) Punjab FC | Free transfer | |
| 30 August 2021 | (India) Lovepreet Singh | GK | 1 | (India) Delhi | Free transfer | |
| 1 September 2021 | (India) Prashant Narayan Choudhary | DF | 20 | (India) Rajasthan United FC | Free transfer | |

== Round Glass Punjab ==
=== In ===
| No. | Position | Player | Previous club | Transfer fee | Date | Ref |
|---|---|---|---|---|---|---|
| | DM | (India) Shankar Sampingiraj | (India) Chennai City | Free agent | 31 July 2021 | |
| | MF | (India) Kean Lewis | (India) Sudeva FC | Free agent | 2 August 2021 | |
| | FW | (India) Robin Singh | (India) Hyderabad FC | Free agent | 9 August 2021 | |
| | DF | (India) Rino Anto | (India) East Bengal | Free agent | 10 August 2021 | |
| | DF | (India) Gurtej Singh | (India) East Bengal | Free agent | 11 August 2021 | |
| | MF | (India) Ashish Pradhan | (India) Southern Samity | Free agent | 18 August 2021 | |
| | DF | (India) Keegan Pereira | (India) East Bengal | Free agent | 24 August 2021 | |
| | FW | (India) C. K. Vineeth | (India) East Bengal | Free agent | 25 August 2021 | |
| | GK | (India) Lalthuammawia Ralte | (India) Bengaluru FC | Free agent | 28 August 2021 | |
| | DF | (England) John Johnson | (India) ATK Mohun Bagan | Free agent | 1 September 2021 | |
| | FW | (England) Kurtis Guthrie | (England) Port Vale | Free agent | 2 September 2021 | |
| | FW | (Australia) Travis Major | (Australia) Blacktown City | Free agent | 3 September 2021 | |
| | DF | (India) Lalchhuanmawia | (India) Chennaiyin FC | Free agent | 15 September 2021 | |
| | DF | (England) Josef Yarney | (England) Weymouth | Free agent | 5 November 2021 | |

=== Out ===
| No. | Position | Player | Outgoing club | Ref |
|---|---|---|---|---|
| 05 | DF | (India) Anwar Ali | (India) Delhi FC | |
| 04 | DF | (India) Ruivah Hormipam | (India) Kerala Blasters FC | |
| 03 | MF | (India) Samad Ali Mallick | (India) Sreenidi Deccan | |
| 03 | GK | (India) Devansh Dabas | (India) Lonestar Kashmir | |
| 15 | MF | (India) Sanju Pradhan | (India) Bengaluru United | |
| 7 | FW | (Bhutan) Chencho Gyeltshen | (India) Kerala Blasters | |
| 10 | FW | (Senegal) Baba Diawara | | |
| 1 | GK | (Nepal) Kiran Chemjong | (Nepal) Dhangadhi FC | |
| 8 | MF | (India) Souvik Das | (India) Sudeva Delhi | |
| 19 | DF | (India) Mohammed Irshad | (India) NorthEast United | |
| | FW | (India) Jiten Murmu | (India) Madan Maharaj | |
| | FW | (India) Abhinas Ruidas | (India) Madan Maharaj | |

== Real Kashmir ==
=== Transfers in ===
| Date from | Position | Nationality | Name | From | Fee | Ref. |
|---|---|---|---|---|---|---|
| 31 August 2021 | MF | (India) | Bhupender Singh | (India) Jamshedpur | Loan | |
| 31 August 2021 | GK | (India) | Niraj Kumar | (India) Jamshedpur | Loan | |
| 2 October 2021 | DF | (India) | Thoi Singh | (India) Chennaiyin | None | |
| 2 October 2021 | MF | (India) | Surchandra Singh | (India) East Bengal | None | |
| 19 October 2021 | DF | (Spain) | Fran Gonzalez | (India) Bengaluru | None | |
| 21 October 2021 | MF | (India) | Mir Zahid | Academy | None | |
| 22 October 2021 | FW | (India) | Malemngamba Meitei | (India) FC Bengaluru United | None | |
| 24 October 2021 | DF | (India) | Aaqib Amin | | None | |
| 26 October 2021 | FW | (Brazil) | Tiago Adan | (Brazil) Retrô | None | |
| 27 October 2021 | MF | (India) | Prakash Sarkar | (India) East Bengal | None | |
| 28 October 2021 | FW | (India) | Thomyo Shimray | | None | |
| 28 October 2021 | DF | (India) | Lalchhawnkima | | None | |
| 29 October 2021 | MF | (India) | Pratesh Shirodkar | (India) Dempo | None | |
| 31 October 2021 | MF | (India) | Saikat Sarkar | (India) Rainbow A.C | None | |
| 1 November 2021 | GK | (India) | Bilal Khan | (India) Kerala Blasters FC | None | |
| 5 November 2021 | CB | (India) | Koushik Sarkar | (India) Peerless FC | None | |
| 1 November 2021 | GK | (India) | Subham Roy | (India) Bhawanipore FC | None | |
| 10 November 2021 | CB | (India) | Ponif Vaz | (India) Northeast United FC | None | |
| 10 November 2021 | DF | (India) | Rishik Shetty | | None | |
| 11 November 2021 | FW | (India) | Bawlte Rohmingthanga | (India) Aizawl F.C. | None | |
| 15 November 2021 | MF | (India) | Ragav Gupta | (India) Lonestar Kashmir | None | |
| 25 December 2021 | DF | (South Korea) | Park Jong-oh | (Thailand) Trat | None | |
| 1 March 2022 | FW | (Ivory Coast) | Bernard Yao Kouassi | | None | |

=== Transfers out ===
| Date from | Position | Nationality | Name | To | Fee | Ref. |
|---|---|---|---|---|---|---|
| 1 July 2021 | DF | (Afghanistan) | Zohib Islam Amiri | (Canada) A.S. Blainville | Released | |
| 11 July 2021 | GK | (India) | Mithun Samanta | (India) Mohammedan | Released | |
| 25 July 2021 | MF | (India) | Danish Farooq Bhat | (India) Bengaluru | Released | |
| 18 August 2021 | DF | (India) | Bijay Chetri | (India) Sreenidhi FC | Released | |
| 23 August 2021 | DF | (India) | Pawan Kumar | (India) Gokulam Kerala | Released | |
| 1 September 2021 | FW | (Cameroon) | Aser Pierrick Dipanda | (India) Delhi | Released | |
| 2 September 2021 | DF | (India) | Dharmaraj Ravanan | (India) Bengaluru United | Released | |
| 2 September 2021 | DF | (India) | Arun Nagial | (India) Kerala United FC | Released | |
| 26 October 2021 | FW | (Nigeria) | Lukman Adefemi | | Released | |
| 26 October 2021 | DF | (India) | Arjun Naghial | | Released | |
| 26 October 2021 | GK | (India) | Anuj Kumar | (India) Hyderabad FC | Loan Return | |
| 26 October 2021 | MF | (India) | Shahnawaz Bashir | (India) Hyderiya Sports | Released | |
| 26 October 2021 | FW | (India) | Rohit Jhamat | | Released | |
| 26 October 2021 | FW | (India) | Ifham Tariq Mir | (India) Hyderiya Sports | Released | |

== NEROCA ==
=== Transfers in ===
| Date | Position | Nationality | Name | From | Fee | Ref. |
|---|---|---|---|---|---|---|
| 16 June 2021 | DF | (India) | Jonathan Cardozo | (India) FC Goa Reserves | None | |
| 22 June 2021 | MF | (India) | Vicky Meitei | (India) TRAU | None | |
| 23 June 2021 | DF | (India) | Mohammad Abdul salam | (India) TRAU | None | |
| 23 June 2021 | GK | (India) | Prateek Kumar Singh | (India) Chennai City | None | |
| 23 June 2021 | MF | (India) | Pukhrambam Manisana | (India) Jamshedpur FC | None | |
| 7 August 2021 | MF | (India) | Hrishikesh Namboothiri | Delhi Trials | None | |
| 7 August 2021 | DF | (India) | Madan Saiprasad Ghogale | Delhi Trials | None | |
| 7 August 2021 | DF | (India) | Ayush Kumar Singh | Delhi Trials | None | |
| 8 August 2021 | MF | (Spain) | Juan Mera | (Spain) Lealtad | None | |
| 15 August 2021 | FW | (Lebanon) | Mohamad Kdouh | (Lebanon) Racing Beirut | None | |
| 24 August 2021 | FW | (India) | Nikhil Sharan | Chennai Trials | None | |
| 25 August 2021 | DF | (India) | Inban Udhyanidhi | Chennai Trials | None | |
| 26 August 2021 | DF | (India) | Lallenmang Sitihou | (India) Sagolband United | None | |
| 26 August 2021 | DF | (Brazil) | Danilo Quipapá | (India) Punjab | None | |
| 27 August 2021 | DF | (India) | Gerrald Barretto | Chennai Trials | None | |
| 29 August 2021 | FW | (Spain) | Sergio Mendigutxia | (Spain) Marino de Luanco | None | |
| 31 August 2021 | GK | (India) | Shubham Dhas | (India) Goa | None | |

=== Loans in ===
| Date from | Position | Nationality | Name | From | Date until | Ref. |
|---|---|---|---|---|---|---|
| 28 June 2021 | FW | (India) | Sweden Fernandes | (India) Hyderabad FC | None | |

=== Transfers out ===
| Date | Position | Nationality | Name | To | Fee | Ref. |
|---|---|---|---|---|---|---|
| 3 July 2021 | DF | (India) | Takhellambam Deepak | (India) Gokulam Kerala | None | |
| 5 July 2021 | FW | (India) | Khanngnam Horam | (India) TRAU | None | |
| 16 July 2021 | DF | (India) | Shoaib Akhtar | (India) Gokulam Kerala | None | |
| 23 July 2021 | DF | (India) | Akbar Khan | (India) Gokulam Kerala | None | |
| 23 July 2021 | DF | (Liberia) | Varney Kallon | (India) Calcutta Customs | None | |
| 23 July 2021 | MF | (Trinidad and Tobago) | Nathaniel García | | None | |
| 23 July 2021 | FW | (Trinidad and Tobago) | Judah García | (Greece) AEK Athens B | None | |
| 23 July 2021 | MF | (Nepal) | Prakash Budhathoki | (Nepal) Friends Club | | |
| 1 September 2021 | GK | (India) | Loitongbam Bishorjit Singh | (India) Kenkre FC | None | |
| 7 September 2021 | MF | (India) | Songpu Singsit | (India) East Bengal | None | |

== TRAU ==
=== Transfers in ===
| Date from | Position | Nationality | Name | From | Fee | Ref. |
|---|---|---|---|---|---|---|
| 27 June 2021 | MF | (India) | Bikash singh sagolshem | (India) East Bengal (R) | None | |
| 2 July 2021 | FW | (India) | Joysana Nongthombam | (India) Chennaiyin FC B | None | |
| 5 July 2021 | FW | (India) | Khanngnam Horam | (India) NEROCA FC | None | |
| 9 July 2021 | FW | (India) | Buanthanglun Samte | (India) ATK Reserves | None | |
| 10 July 2021 | FW | (India) | Timothy Haokip | (India) ATK Reserves | None | |
| 23 July 2021 | DF | (India) | Roshan Singh | (India) Gokulam Kerala FC | None | |
| 3 August 2021 | DF | (India) | Mohamemed Sarif Khan | (India) Chennaiyin FC B | None | |
| 23 August 2021 | DF | (India) | Clinton Khuman | (India) East Bengal (R) | None | |
| 29 August 2021 | DF | (India) | Manash Protim Gogoi | (India) Jamshedpur FC | None | |
| 29 August 2021 | FW | (Uzbekistan) | Akobir Turaev | (Tajikistan) Eskhata Khujand | None | |
| 23 September 2021 | GK | (India) | Manas Dubey | (India) Hyderabad FC | Loan | |

=== Transfers out ===
| Date from | Position | Nationality | Name | To | Fee | Ref. |
|---|---|---|---|---|---|---|
| 22 June 2021 | MF | (India) | Vicky Meitei | NEROCA FC | Released | |
| 23 June 2021 | DF | (India) | Mohammad Abdul Salam | NEROCA FC | None | |
| 27 June 2021 | MF | (India) | Khundongbam Krishnanda | Gokulam Kerala | None | |
| 29 June 2021 | DF | (India) | Soraisham Dinesh Singh | Sreenidhi FC | None | |
| 30 June 2021 | MF | (India) | Chanso Horam | Mumbai City | Loan Spell Ends | |
| 28 July 2021 | FW | (India) | Bidyashagar Singh | Bengaluru FC | None | |
| 3 August 2021 | MF | (Tajikistan) | Komron Tursunov | (Tajikistan) FK Khujand | None | |
| 29 August 2021 | MF | (India) | Shahbaaz Khan | Sreenidhi FC | None | |
| 6 September 2021 | FW | (India) | Mayosing Khongreiwa | Sreenidhi FC | None | |
| 8 September 2021 | MF | (India) | Phalguni Konsam | Sreenidhi FC | None | |

== Aizawl ==
=== In ===
| No. | Position | Player | Previous club | Date | Ref |
|---|---|---|---|---|---|
| 23 | MF | (Argentina) Matías Verón | (Spain) Guadix CF | 3 September 2021 | |
| 9 | FW | (India) Lalliansanga | (India) Gokulam Kerala FC | 3 September 2021 | |
| | FW | (India) R.Lalthanmawia | | 6 September 2021 | |

=== Loans in ===
| Date from | Position | Nationality | Name | From | Date until | Ref. |
|---|---|---|---|---|---|---|
| 21 August 2021 | GK | (India) | Anuj Kumar | (India) Hyderabad FC | 31 May 2022 | |

=== Out ===
| No. | Position | Player | To | Date | Ref |
|---|---|---|---|---|---|
| 21 | GK | Zothanmawia | Mohammedan | 26 July 2021 | |
| | FW | Mc Malsawmzuala | (India) Sreenidi Deccan | 31 July 2021 | |
| | DF | Lalchungnunga | (India) Sreenidi Deccan | 10 August 2021 | |
| 4 | DF | PC Laldinpuia | (India) Jamshedpur FC | 25 August 2021 | |
| 6 | DF | Vanlalzuidika Chhakchhuak | Sudeva Delhi | 1 September 2021 | |
| | DF | Lalmawizuala | Delhi FC | 1 September 2021 | |
| 22 | FW | David Lalthansanga | Forward FC | 1 September 2021 | |
| 15 | FW | Bawlte Rohmingthanga | Real Kashmir | 11 November 2021 | |

=== Loans Out ===
| Date from | Position | Nationality | Name | to | Date until | Ref. |
|---|---|---|---|---|---|---|
| 21 August 2021 | MF | (Liberia) | Alfred Jaryan | (India) Aryan | | |

== Sreenidi Deccan ==
=== Transfers in ===
| Entry date | Position | Player | Previous club | Fee | Ref. |
|---|---|---|---|---|---|
| 18 June 2021 | GK | Ubaid CK | (India) Gokulam Kerala FC | None | |
| 25 June 2021 | DF | Dinesh Singh | (India) TRAU | None | |
| 30 June 2021 | MF | Mayakkannan | (India) Gokulam Kerala FC | None | |
| 4 July 2021 | GK | Shibinraj Kunniyil | (India) Churchill Brothers | None | |
| 10 July 2021 | FW | Lalromawia | (India) Gokulam Kerala FC | None | |
| 10 July 2021 | FW | Lalromawia | (India) Gokulam Kerala FC | None | |
| 15 July 2021 | DF | Samad Ali Mallick | (India) Punjab FC | None | |
| 21 July 2021 | MF | Shibil Muhammed | (India) Gokulam Kerala FC | None | |
| 27 July 2021 | MF | Suraj Rawat | (India) Mohammedan S.C. | None | |
| 31 July 2021 | FW | Mc Malsawmzuala | (India) Aizawl F.C. | None | |
| 4 August 2021 | MF | Fredsan Marshall | (India) Churchill Brothers | None | |
| 7 August 2021 | DF | Shahbaaz Khan | (India) TRAU | None | |
| 10 August 2021 | DF | Lalchungnunga | (India) Aizawl F.C. | None | |
| 13 August 2021 | MF | Vanlalbiaa Chhangte | (India) Mohammedan S.C. | None | |
| 18 August 2021 | DF | Bijay Chetri | (India) Real Kashmir | None | |
| 22 August 2021 | FW | Girik Khosla | (India) East Bengal | None | |
| 26 August 2021 | DF | Arijit Bagui | (India) Mohammedan S.C. | None | |
| 30 August 2021 | MF | Sriram Boopathi | (India) Chennai City | None | |
| 3 September 2021 | FW | Mayosing Khongreiwoshi | (India) TRAU | None | |
| 9 September 2021 | MF | Phalguni Singh | (India) TRAU | None | |
| 15 September 2021 | CF | Vineeth Kumar | (India) Chennai City | None | |
| 20 September 2021 | CF | (Colombia) David Castañeda | (Iraq) Zakho | None | |
| 28 September 2021 | DF | (Ghana) Mohamed Awal | (India) Gokulam Kerala FC | None | |
| 13 October 2021 | FW | Sunil Bathala | Academy | None | |
| 14 October 2021 | FW | KP Rahul | (India) Gokulam Kerala FC | None | |
| 19 October 2021 | MF | Uma Sankar | (India) Chennai City | None | |
| 22 October 2021 | FW | Rosenberg Gabriel | | None | |
