= 2021–22 Sreenidi Deccan FC season =

2021–22 season of Sreenidi Deccan FC

Sreenidi Deccan
2021–22 season
- Owner: Sreenidhi Group
- Head coach: Fernando Santiago Varela
- I-League: 3rd
- AIFF Super Cup: Cancelled
- IFA Shield: Runners-up
- Top goalscorer: League: David Castañeda (10 goals); All: David Castañeda (13 goals)
Home colours

The 2021–22 season is Sreenidi Deccan Football Club's first season. They participated in the I-League, the first level of Indian football. The Super Cup, the Indian domestic cup, was not held due to the COVID-19 pandemic.

On 5 June 2020, All India Football Federation issued an invitation to accept bids for new clubs to join the I-League from 2020 onwards; on 12 August, Sreenidi Deccan were granted playing rights directly in the 2021–22 season.

== Squad ==
As of 19 October 2021

Note: Flags indicate national team as defined under FIFA eligibility rules; some limited exceptions apply. Players may hold more than one non-FIFA nationality.

No.	Pos.	Nation	Player
1	GK	IND	Ubaid CK
2	DF	IND	Shahbaaz Khan
4	DF	IND	Lalchungnunga
5	DF	IND	Dinesh Singh
6	MF	IND	Phalguni Singh
7	FW	IND	Vanlalbiaa Chhangte
8	MF	IND	Uma Sankar
9	MF	IND	Fredsan Marshall
10	FW	IND	Girik Khosla
11	FW	COL	David Castañeda
13	MF	IND	Mayakkannan
16	FW	IND	Vineeth Kumar
17	FW	IND	Rosenberg Gabriel
21	FW	IND	Lalromawia
22	DF	IND	Sriram Boopathi

No.	Pos.	Nation	Player
27	FW	IND	Mayosing Khongreiwoshi
29	FW	IND	Mc Malsawmzuala
32	DF	IND	Mohamed Salah
36	MF	IND	Suraj Rawat
38	DF	IND	Samad Ali Mallick
42	GK	IND	Shibinraj Kunniyil
49	DF	GHA	Mohamed Awal
—	MF	IND	Shibil Muhammed
—	DF	IND	Bijay Chetri
—	DF	IND	Arijit Bagui
—	FW	IND	Sunil Bathala
—	FW	IND	KP Rahul

== Transfers and loans ==
=== Transfers in ===
Entry date	Position	Player	Previous club	Fee	Ref.
18 June 2021	GK	Ubaid CK	(India) Gokulam Kerala FC	None	
25 June 2021	DF	Dinesh Singh	(India) TRAU	None	
30 June 2021	MF	Mayakkannan	(India) Gokulam Kerala FC	None	
4 July 2021	GK	Shibinraj Kunniyil	(India) Churchill Brothers	None	
10 July 2021	FW	Lalromawia	(India) Gokulam Kerala FC	None	
10 July 2021	FW	Lalromawia	(India) Gokulam Kerala FC	None	
15 July 2021	DF	Samad Ali Mallick	(India) Punjab FC	None	
21 July 2021	MF	Shibil Muhammed	(India) Gokulam Kerala FC	None	
27 July 2021	MF	Suraj Rawat	(India) Mohammedan S.C.	None	
31 July 2021	FW	Mc Malsawmzuala	(India) Aizawl F.C.	None	
4 August 2021	MF	Fredsan Marshall	(India) Churchill Brothers	None	
7 August 2021	DF	Shahbaaz Khan	(India) TRAU	None	
10 August 2021	DF	Lalchungnunga	(India) Aizawl F.C.	None	
13 August 2021	MF	Vanlalbiaa Chhangte	(India) Mohammedan S.C.	None	
18 August 2021	DF	Bijay Chetri	(India) Real Kashmir	None	
22 August 2021	FW	Girik Khosla	(India) East Bengal	None	
26 August 2021	DF	Arijit Bagui	(India) Mohammedan S.C.	None	
30 August 2021	MF	Sriram Boopathi	(India) Chennai City	None	
3 September 2021	FW	Mayosing Khongreiwoshi	(India) TRAU	None	
9 September 2021	MF	Phalguni Singh	(India) TRAU	None	
15 September 2021	CF	Vineeth Kumar	(India) Chennai City	None	
20 September 2021	CF	(Colombia) David Castañeda	(Iraq) Zakho	None	
28 September 2021	DF	(Ghana) Mohamed Awal	(India) Gokulam Kerala FC	None	
13 October 2021	FW	Sunil Bathala	Academy	None	
14 October 2021	FW	KP Rahul	(India) Gokulam Kerala FC	None	
19 October 2021	MF	Uma Sankar	(India) Chennai City	None	
22 October 2021	FW	Rosenberg Gabriel		None	

== Technical staff ==
As of 23 April 2021

Role	Name
Head coach	(Spain) Fernando Santiago Varela
Assistant coach	(India) Birendra Thapa
Conditioning coach	(Mexico) Jorge Ovando Toledo
Goalkeeping coach	TBA
Performance Analyst	(India) Saiguhan E.

Last updated: 23 December 2020

== Pre-season ==
22 August 2021 Friendly	Sreenidhi Deccan	2–1	Hyderabad XI	Hyderabad
16.00 IST

== I-League ==
=== Phase 1 ===
Pos	Team	Pld	W	D	L	GF	GA	GD	Pts	Qualification
2	Mohammedan	12	8	2	2	23	12	+11	26	Championship stage
3	RoundGlass Punjab	12	7	2	3	25	17	+8	23	Championship stage
4	Sreenidi Deccan	12	6	3	3	18	14	+4	21	Championship stage
5	Churchill Brothers	12	6	2	4	16	15	+1	20	Championship stage
6	NEROCA	12	4	6	2	17	16	+1	18	Championship stage

Source: Hero I-League
Rules for classification: 1) points; 2) head-to-head points; 3) head-to-head goal difference; 4) goal difference; 5) number of goals scored; 6) drawing of lots

=== Phase 2 ===
Pos	Team	Pld	W	D	L	GF	GA	GD	Pts	Qualification
1	Gokulam Kerala	18	13	4	1	44	15	+29	43	Champions and qualification for the play–offs for 2023–24 AFC Cup group stage spot
2	Mohammedan	18	11	4	3	34	18	+16	37	
3	Sreenidi Deccan	18	9	5	4	27	19	+8	32	
4	Churchill Brothers	18	9	3	6	24	22	+2	30	
5	RoundGlass Punjab	18	8	4	6	33	29	+4	28	

Source: Hero I-League
Rules for classification: 1) points; 2) head-to-head points; 3) head-to-head goal difference; 4) goal difference; 5) number of goals scored; 6) drawing of lots

=== Final standings ===
Pos	Team	Pld	W	D	L	GF	GA	GD	Pts
1	Gokulam Kerala (C)	18	13	4	1	44	15	+29	43
2	Mohammedan	18	11	4	3	34	18	+16	37
3	Sreenidi Deccan	18	9	5	4	27	19	+8	32
4	Churchill Brothers	18	9	3	6	24	22	+2	30
5	RoundGlass Punjab	18	8	4	6	33	29	+4	28

Source: Hero I-League
Rules for classification: 1) points; 2) head-to-head points; 3) head-to-head goal difference; 4) goal difference; 5) number of goals scored; 6) drawing of lots
(C) Champions
