= 2020–21 Gokulam Kerala FC season =

Indian football club season

Gokulam Kerala
2020–21 season
- Chairman: Gokulam Gopalan
- Head Coach: Vincenzo Alberto Annese
- Stadium: EMS Stadium
- I-League: 2020–21 I-League
- IFA Shield: quarter finals
- Top goalscorer: League: Denny Antwi (11 goals); All: Denny Antwi (18 goals)
Home colours	Away colours

The 2020-21 season was Gokulam Kerala's fourth season since its establishment in 2017 and their fourth season in the I-League.In addition to the I league Gokulam Kerala also participated in the Durand Cup and IFA Shield

== Squad information ==
=== First-team squad ===
Squad no.	Name	Nationality	Position(s)	Age	Previous club	Since
Goalkeepers
1	Ubaid CK	(India)	GK	30	(India) East Bengal	2019
30	Vicky Bhaskaran	(India)	GK	30	Academy	2019
31	Ajmal PA	(India)	GK	24	Academy	2018
	Shayan Roy	(India)	GK	28	(India) TRAU	2020
Defenders
2	Naocha Singh	(India)	LB	20	(India) NEROCA	2019
3	Jasim	(India)	LB	20	Academy	2020
4	Rowilson Rodrigues	(India)	CB	33	(India) Churchill Brothers	2020
5	Sharif Mukhammad	(Afghanistan)	CB	30	(Maldives) Maziya	2020
6	Ashok Singh	(India)	CB	27	(India) NEROCA	2019
14	Zodingliana Ralte	(India)	LB	25	(India) NEROCA	2020
15	Mohamed Salah	(India)	LB	25	(India) SAT Tirur	2019
24	Jestin George	(India)	CB	22	Academy	2018
26	Deepak Devrani	(India)	CB	28	(India) TRAU	2020
27	Sebastian Thangmuansang	(India)	RB	22	(India) NEROCA	2019
49	Mohamed Awal	(Ghana)	CB	32	(Ethiopia) Wolkite City	2020
	Muhammad Asif	(India)	CB	23	(Nepal) Chyasal Youth Club	2020
	Chingkham Roshan Singh	(India)	CB	25	(India) NEROCA	2020
MidFielders
12	Muhammed Rashid	(India)	CM	26	Academy	2017
13	Mayakkannan	(India)	CM	26	Academy	2019
16	Salman K	(India)	RW	24	Academy	2017
17	Thahir Zaman	(India)	CM/AM	22	Academy	2020
18	Jithin M S	(India)	CM/AM	22	(India) Kerala blasters	2019
22	Shibil Muhammed	(India)	CM/AM	22	Academy	2019
47	Vincy Barreto	(India)	CM/AM	22	(India) FC GOA Reserves	2020
	Mahip Adhikari	(India)	CM/AM	22	Garhwal	2020
Forwards
10	Ngangom Ronald Singh	(India)	RW/ST	23	(India) NEROCA	2020
11	Emil Benny	(India)	RW	21	Academy	2020
20	Philip Adjah	(Ghana)	FW	24	(India) Mohammedan	2020
28	Lalromawia	(India)	RW	22	(India) Chhinga Veng F.C.	2019
33	Denny Antwi	(Ghana)	FW	27	(Sweden) Trelleborg	2020
	Malemngamba Meitei	(India)	RW		(India) NEROCA	2019
	Faslu Rahman	(India)	RW	25	(India) SAT Tirur	2020

=== Other contracts ===
Note: Flags indicate national team as defined under FIFA eligibility rules; some limited exceptions apply. Players may hold more than one non-FIFA nationality.

No.	Pos.	Nation	Player
6	MF	IND	Shameel
7	MF	IND	Sanathoi Singh
9	FW	IND	Shihad Nelliparamban
19	MF	IND	Ganesan
-	DF	IND	Safwan
-	DF	IND	Febin
-	MF	IND	Alphin
-	MF	IND	Mahin
-	FW	IND	Safeer
2	MF	IND	Pritam Singh

== Transfers and loans ==
=== Transfers in ===
Entry date	Position	No.	Player	Previous club	Fee	Ref.
18 July 2020	FW	10	Ngangom Ronald Singh	(India) NEROCA	None	
25 July 2020	DF		Muhammed Asif	(Nepal) Chyasal Youth Club	None	
2 August 2020	FW		Faslu Rahman	(India) Sports Academy Tirur	none	
9 August 2020	DM		Rishad PP	(India) Sports Academy Tirur	None	
14 August 2020	GK		Shayan Roy	(India) TRAU	none	
28 August 2020	DF		Chingkham Roshan Singh	(India) NEROCA	None	
5 September 2020	DF	14	Zodingliana Ralte	(India) NEROCA	None	
19 September 2020	DF	26	Deepak Devrani	(India) TRAU	None	
25 September 2020	DF	4	Rowilson Rodrigues	(India) Churchill Brothers	None	
25 October 2020	DF		(India) Ajin Tom	(India) Indian Arrows	None	
30 October 2020	FW	33	(Ghana) Denny Antwi	(Sweden) Trelleborg	None	
6 November 2020	MF		(India) Mahip Adhikari	(India) Garhwal	None	
13 November 2020	DF	5	(Afghanistan) Sharif Mukhammad	(Maldives) Maziya	None	
20 November 2020	DF	49	(Ghana) Mohamed Awal	(Ethiopia) Wolkite City	None	
25 November 2020	FW	20	(Mali) Saliou Guindo	(Turkey) Ankara Keçiörengücü	None	
4 December 2020	MF	35	(India) Vincy Barreto	(India)	None	
5 December 2020	DF	3	(India) Jasim	Academy	None	
5 December 2020	MF	28	(India) Thahir Zaman	Academy	None	
5 December 2020	MF	11	(India) Emil Benny	Academy	None	
2 January 2021	FW	50	(Ghana) Philip Adjah	(India) Mohammedan	None	
8 January 2021	DF	04	(India) Alex Saji	Academy	None	

=== Transfers out ===
Exit date	Position	No.	Player	To club	Fee	Ref.
5 June 2020	DF	06	(India) Wungngayam Muirang	(India) Bengaluru FC	None	
17 June 2020	DF	06	(India) Mohammed Irshad	(India) East Bengal FC	None	
22 June 2020	DF	04	(Afghanistan) Zohib Islam Amiri	(India) Real Kashmir		
28 June 2020	DF	06	(India) Dharmaraj Ravanan	(India) Real Kashmir		
14 September 2020	MF	23	(India) Nicholas Fernandes	(India) Bengaluru United		
15 September 2020	CF	31	(Uganda) Henry Kisekka	(Uganda) URA Kampala		
30 September 2020	MF	08	(Trinidad and Tobago) Nathaniel García	(India) NEROCA		
23 November 2020	DF	05	(Trinidad and Tobago) Andre Ettienne			
23 November 2020	FW	10	(Trinidad and Tobago) Marcus Joseph			
23 November 2020	FW	11	(Rwanda) Atuheire Kipson			
2 December 2020	FW	06	(India) Rajesh S	(India) Chennai City FC		
2 January 2021	FW	20	(Mali) Saliou Guindo			

== Pre-season ==
	Gokulam Kerala	4-1	Indian Arrows	Kolkata
19.00 IST				Stadium: Kalyani Stadium, Kalyani

	Gokulam Kerala	5-0	TRIJIT DAS FA	Kolkata
19.00 IST				Stadium: Kalyani Stadium, Kalyani

	Gokulam Kerala	1-0	Real Kashmir	Kolkata
19.00 IST				Stadium: Kalyani Stadium, Kalyani

	Gokulam Kerala	1-0	TRIJIT DAS FA	Kolkata
19.00 IST				Stadium: Kalyani Stadium, Kalyani

== Competitions ==
Win Draw Loss Cancelled

=== Overview ===
Competition	First match	Last match	Starting round	Final position	Record							
Competition	First match	Last match	Starting round	Final position	Pld	W	D	L	GF	GA	GD	Win %
I League	9 January 2021	27 March 2021	Matchday 1	Champions	15	9	2	4	31	17	+14	60.00
2020 IFA Shield	6 December 2020	14 December 2020	Group Stage	Quarter finals	3	1	0	2	7	4	+3	33.33
Super Cup	TBD	TBD		-	0	0	0	0	0	0	+0	—
Total					18	10	2	6	38	21	+17	55.56

Last updated: 13 February 2021.
Source: Competitions

== I-league ==
=== League table ===
Pos	Team	Pld	W	D	L	GF	GA	GD	Pts	Qualification or relegation
2	Punjab	10	5	3	2	12	7	+5	18	Promote to Championship Stage (Group A)
3	Real Kashmir	10	4	5	1	18	9	+9	17	Promote to Championship Stage (Group A)
4	Gokulam Kerala	10	5	1	4	20	14	+6	16	Promote to Championship Stage (Group A)
5	TRAU	10	4	4	2	17	13	+4	16	Promote to Championship Stage (Group A)
6	Mohammedan	10	4	4	2	9	8	+1	16	Promote to Championship Stage (Group A)

Source: I-League
Rules for classification: 1) points; 2) head-to-head points; 3) head-to-head goal difference; 4) goal difference; 5) number of goals scored; 6) drawing of lots
- Due to COVID-19 pandemic, this season's league format was shortened. All teams will face each other once in the first leg of the league, then they will be divided into two different groups. According to points table from first leg, top six teams will face each other once again in the Championship stage, where the team with maximum points (cumulative points collected from all fifteen matches) will be declared the winner of the league and qualify for the 2022 AFC Cup group stage. Whereas the other five teams will play against each other in a Relegation stage where the team with the lowest points (cumulative points collected from all fourteen matches) will be relegated to the 2nd Division League.

=== Results by round ===
Round	1	2	3	4	5	6	7	8	9	10	11
Result	L	W	L	W	D	-	L	W	W	W	L
Position	8	5	10	3	4	6	9	5	4	3	4

W = Win; D = Draw; L = Loss

=== Matches ===
Win Draw Loss

09.01.2021 1	Gokulam Kerala	1-2	Chennai City	Kolkata
19.00 IST				Stadium: Kalyani Stadium, Kalyani

14.01.2020 2	Gokulam Kerala	4-3	Punjab	Kolkata
14.00 IST				Stadium: Salt Lake Stadium

20.01.2021 3	Aizawl	2-0	Gokulam Kerala	Kolkata
16.00 IST

25.01.2021 4	NEROCA	1-4	Gokulam Kerala	Kolkata
19.00 IST				Stadium: Kalyani Stadium, Kalyani

30.01.2021 5	Gokulam Kerala	0-0	Real Kashmir	Kolkata
19.00 IST				Stadium: Kalyani Stadium, Kalyani

08.02.2021 6	Mohammedan	2-1	Gokulam Kerala	Kolkata
16.45 IST				Stadium: Kalyani Stadium, Kalyani

13.02.2021 7	TRAU	1-3	Gokulam Kerala	Kolkata
14.00 IST				Stadium: Salt Lake Stadium

19.02.2021 8	Gokulam Kerala	4-0	Indian Arrows	Kolkata
19.00 IST				Stadium: Kalyani Stadium, Kalyani

23.02.2021 9	Sudeva Delhi FC	0-1	Gokulam Kerala	Kolkata
16.00 IST				Stadium: Kalyani Stadium, Kalyani

01.03.2021 10	Gokulam Kerala	2-3	Churchill Brothers	Kolkata
14.00				Stadium: Kalyani Stadium, Kalyani

=== Championship Stage (Group A) ===
Pos	Team	Pld	W	D	L	GF	GA	GD	Pts	Qualification
1	Gokulam Kerala (C)	15	9	2	4	31	17	+14	29	Champions and Qualification for 2022 AFC Cup group stage
2	Churchill Brothers	15	8	5	2	22	17	+5	29	
3	TRAU	15	7	5	3	27	19	+8	26	
4	Punjab	15	6	4	5	18	15	+3	22	
5	Real Kashmir	15	5	6	4	23	18	+5	21	
6	Mohammedan	15	5	5	5	18	20	−2	20	

Updated to match(es) played on 27 March 2021. Source: I-League
Rules for classification: 1) points; 2) head-to-head points; 3) head-to-head goal difference; 4) goal difference; 5) number of goals scored; 6) drawing of lots
(C) Champions

=== Results by round ===
Round	1	2	3	4	5
Result	W	W	D	W	W
Position	2	2	2	1	1

W = Win; D = Draw; L = Loss

=== Matches ===
Win Draw Loss

05.03.2020 1	Punjab	0-1	Gokulam Kerala	Kolkata
19.00 IST				Stadium: Kalyani Stadium

10.03.2021 2	Churchill Brothers	0-3	Gokulam Kerala	Kolkata
14.00				Stadium: Kalyani Stadium, Kalyani

15.03.2021 3	Gokulam Kerala	1-1	Real Kashmir	Kolkata
14.00 IST				Stadium: Salt Lake Stadium

21.03.2021 4	Mohammedan	1-2	Gokulam Kerala	Kolkata
19.00 IST				Stadium: Kalyani Stadium, Kalyani

24.03.21 5	Gokulam Kerala	4-1	TRAU	Kolkata
IST

== IFA Shield ==
=== Group D ===
Pos	Team	Pld	W	D	L	GF	GA	GD	Pts	
1	United	2	2	0	0	3	1	+2	6	Advance to the quarterfinals
2	Gokulam Kerala	2	1	0	1	7	3	+4	3	Advance to the quarterfinals
3	BSS	2	0	0	2	3	9	−6	0	

Source: ifawb.org

6 December 2020	Gokulam Kerala	0-1	United SC	Howrah
15:00		Report		Stadium: Howrah Stadium,

12 December 2020	Gokulam Kerala	7–2	BSS	Sailen Manna Stadium, Howrah
13:30 IST	Dennis Antwi 8' 12'; 19' 47'; Shibil Muhammed 66'; Jithin M S 72'; Saliou Guindo 85'	Report	Pritam Roy 67'; Asif Ali Moula 74'	Attendance: 0

==== Quarter-finals ====
14 December 2020	Mohammedan	1-0	Gokulam Kerala	Kalyani
13:00				Stadium: Kalyani Stadium

== Current technical staff ==
Position	Name
Head Coach	(Italy) Vincenzo Alberto Annese
Fitness and conditioning Coach	(Brazil) Djair Miranda Garcia
Technical Director	(India) Bino George
Goalkeeping Coach	(India) Mihir Sawant
Academy Manager	(Gibraltar) Joel Richard Williams

== Statistics ==
As of 19 February 2021.

=== Squad appearances ===
No.	Pos.	Nat.	Name	I-League		2020 IFA Shield		Super Cup		Total	
No.	Pos.	Nat.	Name	Apps	Starts	Apps	Starts	Apps	Starts	Apps	Starts
01	GK	(India)	Ubaid CK	14	14	3	3	0	0	17	17
02	LB	(India)	Naocha Singh	15	15	3	3	0	0	18	18
03	CB	(India)	Mohammed Jassim	2	0	-	-	0	0	2	0
04	CB	(India)	Alex Saji	5	3	-	-	0	0	5	3
10	FW	(India)	Ngangom Ronald Singh	12	4	3	3	0	0	15	7
11	FW	(India)	Emil Benny	13	12	-	-	0	0	13	12
12	MF	(India)	Muhammed Rashid	8	3	3	3	0	0	11	6
13	MF	(India)	Mayakkannan	14	14	3	3	0	0	17	17
14	FW	(India)	Zodingliana Ralte	6	1	0	0	0	0	6	1
16	FW	(India)	Salman K	1	0	1	1	0	0	2	1
17	MF	(India)	Thahir Zaman	8	1	1	0	0	0	9	1
18	FW	(India)	Jithin M S	6	0	2	1	0	0	8	1
20	FW	(Mali)	Saliou Guindo	0	0	3	1	0	0	3	1
21	DF	(Afghanistan)	Sharif Mukhammad	14	14	-	-	0	0	14	14
22	MF	(India)	Shibil Muhammed	2	1	3	3	0	0	5	4
24	DF	(India)	Jestin George	3	3	3	3	0	0	6	6
26	DF	(India)	Deepak Devrani	14	14	1	0	0	0	15	14
27	DF	(India)	Sebastian Thangmuansang	11	10	3	3	0	0	14	13
28	RB	(India)	Lalromawia	8	4	0	0	0	0	8	4
31	GK	(India)	Ajmal P. A.	1	1	1	0	0	0	2	1
33	FW	(Ghana)	Denny Antwi	15	15	2	2	0	0	18	18
47	MF	(India)	Vincy Barretto	13	7	-	-	0	0	13	7
49	DF	(Ghana)	Mohamed Awal	14	14	3	3	0	0	17	17
50	FW	(Ghana)	Philip Adjah	15	15	-	-	0	0	15	15

=== Goal Scorers ===
Rank	No.	Pos.	Nat.	Name	I League	IFA Shield	Indian Super Cup	Total
1	33	FW	(Ghana)	Denny Antwi	11	4	0	15
2	50	FW	(Ghana)	Philip Adjah	5	0	0	5
3	21	MF	(Afghanistan)	Sharif Mukhammad	4	0	0	4
4	11	FW	(India)	Emil Benny	3	0	0	3
5	18	FW	(India)	Jithin M S	1	1	0	2
6	10	FW	(India)	Ngangom Ronald Singh	1	0	0	1
6	12	MF	(India)	Muhammed Rashid	1	0	0	1
6	14	FW	(India)	Zodingliana Ralte	1	0	0	1
6	20	FW	(Mali)	Saliou Guindo	0	1	0	1
6	22	MF	(India)	Shibil Muhammed	0	1	0	1
6	24	DF	(India)	Jestin George	1	0	0	1
6	27	FW	(India)	Lalromawia	1	0	0	1
Own Goals					2	0	0	2
Total					31	7	0	38

=== Clean sheets ===
No.	Nation	Name	I-League	Super Cup	Total
1	(India)	Ubaid CK	5	0	5
TOTAL			5	0	5
