= 2019–20 Gokulam Kerala FC season =

Indian football club season

Gokulam Kerala
2019–20 season
- Chairman: Gokulam Gopalan
- Head Coach: Santiago Valera
- Stadium: EMS Stadium
- I-League: 2nd
- Durand Cup: Champions
- Top goalscorer: League: Marcus Joseph (7 goals); All: Marcus Joseph (19)
Home colours	Away colours

The 2019–20 season was Gokulam Kerala's third season since its establishment in 2017 and their third season in the I-League. Gokulam Kerala was also involved in the Durand Cup, Sheikh Kamal Cup.

== Squad information ==
=== First-team squad ===
As of 28 November 2019

Note: Flags indicate national team as defined under FIFA eligibility rules; some limited exceptions apply. Players may hold more than one non-FIFA nationality.

No.	Pos.	Nation	Player
1	GK	IND	Ubaid CK
2	DF	IND	Naocha singh
3	DF	IND	Ashok Singh
4	DF	AFG	Zohib Islam Amiri
5	DF	TRI	Andre Ettienne
6	DF	IND	Mohammed Irshad (vice-captain)
8	MF	TRI	Nathaniel García
10	FW	TRI	Marcus Joseph (captain)
11	FW	RWA	Atuheire Kipson
12	MF	IND	Muhammed Rashid
13	DF	IND	Dharmaraj Ravanan
14	FW	IND	Malemngamba Meitei
15	DF	IND	Mohamed Salah

No.	Pos.	Nation	Player
16	FW	IND	Salman K
18	DF	IND	Wungngayam Muirang
21	GK	IND	Vicky
22	MF	IND	Shibil Muhammed
23	MF	IND	Nicholas Fernandes
24	DF	IND	Jestin George
25	DF	IND	Mayakannan
27	DF	IND	Sebastian Thangmuansang
29	FW	IND	Lalromawia
30	FW	IND	Rajesh S
31	FW	UGA	Henry Kisekka
32	FW	IND	Jithin MS
33	GK	IND	Ajmal PA
40	FW	IND	Rahul KP

=== other contracts ===
Note: Flags indicate national team as defined under FIFA eligibility rules; some limited exceptions apply. Players may hold more than one non-FIFA nationality.

No.	Pos.	Nation	Player
6	MF	IND	Shameel
7	MF	IND	Sanathoi singh
9	FW	IND	Shihad Nelliparamban
11	MF	IND	Thahir Zaman
19	MF	IND	Ganesan
27	DF	IND	Jasim
28	FW	GHA	Charles Teiko Folley
-	DF	IND	Safwan
-	DF	IND	Febin
-	MF	IND	Alphin
-	MF	IND	Mahin
-	FW	IND	Safeer

No.	Pos.	Nation	Player
2	MF	IND	Pritam Singh
—	MF	IND	Emil Benny

== Transfers and loans ==
=== Transfers in ===
Entry date	Position	No.	Player	From club	Fee	Ref.
27 June 2019	MF	14	(India) Malemngamba Meitei	(India) NEROCA FC	none	
29 June 2019	MF	30	(India) Lalromawia	(India) Chhinga Veng FC	none	
3 July 2019	GK	—	(India) Lalit Thapa	(India) NEROCA FC	none	
5 July 2019	DF	03	(India) Ashok Singh	(India) NEROCA FC	none	
10 July 2019	LB	15	(India) Mohamed Salah	(India) Sports Academy Tirur	none	
11 July 2019	DF	—	(India) Alex Saji	(India) Kerala Blasters FC Reserves	none	
20 July 2019	MF	11	(Brazil) Bruno Pelissari	(Brazil) Votuporanguense	none	
21 July 2019	FW	31	(Uganda) Henry Kisekka	(India) Mohun Bagan	none	
31 July 2019	DF	19	(India) Sebastian Thangmuansang	(India) NEROCA FC	none	
1 August 2019	GK	01	(India) Ubaid CK	(India) East Bengal	none	
6 August 2019	MF	-	(India) Myron Mendes	(India) Bengaluru FC	none	
6 August 2019	DF	02	(India) Naocha singh	(India) NEROCA FC	none	
6 August 2019	DF	-	(India) Sanju G	Academy	none	
6 August 2019	MF	23	(India) Shibil Muhammed	Academy	none	
6 August 2019	FW	07	(India) Rahul KP	Academy	none	
6 August 2019	GK	44	(India) Vigneswaran Bhaskaran	Academy	none	
6 August 2019	GK	33	(India) Satyajit Bordoloi	Academy	none	
20 August 2019	MF	—	(India) Lalmuanzova	(India) Chhinga Veng FC	none	
20 August 2019	FW	—	(India) Lalliansanga	(India) Chhinga Veng FC	none	
18 September 2019	DF	08	(India) Dharmaraj Ravanan	(India) Real Kashmir	none	
1 October 2019	MF	22	(Trinidad and Tobago) Nathaniel García	(Trinidad and Tobago) Point Fortin	none	
2 November 2019	DF	18	(Afghanistan) Zohib Islam Amiri	(Maldives) New Radiant S.C.	none	
16 November 2019	FW		(India) Jithin MS	(India) Kerala Blasters	none	
10 February 2020	FW		(Rwanda) Atuheire Kipson	(Cambodia) Nagaworld FC	none	

=== Transfers out ===
Exit date	Position	No.	Player	To club	Fee	Ref.
1 March 2019	MF	08	(Brazil) Guilherme Batata	(Indonesia) PSS Sleman	None	
3 June 2019	FW	09	(India) Suhair VP	(India) Mohun Bagan	None	
3 July 2019	GK	42	(India) Shibinraj Kunniyil	(India) Kerala Blasters FC	Undisclosed	
3 July 2019	MF	21	(India) Imran Khan	(India) FC Goa	Loan return	
3 July 2019	RB	21	(India) Mehtab Singh	(India) East Bengal	Loan return	
20 July 2019	FW	27	(Nigeria) Ejiogu Emmanual	(India) Aryan	None	
20 July 2019	DF	03	(India) Deepak Kumar		None	
31 July 2019	MF	15	(India) Arjun Jayaraj	(India) Kerala Blasters FC	Undisclosed	
19 August 2019	FW	-	(Ghana) Christian Saba	(India) Mohammedan	None	
3 September 2019	DF	14	(India) Abhishek Das	(India) TRAU	None	
4 September 2019	DF	05	(Ghana) Daniel Addo	(India) BSS Sporting Club	None	
17 September 2019	FW	17	(India) Gani Ahamed Nigam	(India) Hyderabad FC	None	
2 November 2019	MF	11	(Haiti) Fabien Vorbe		None	
27 November 2019	DF		(India) Jishnu Balakrishnan	(India) Chennai City FC	None	
27 November 2019	GK	29	(India) Arnab Das Sharma	(India)	None	
27 November 2019	DF	30	(India) Monotosh Chakladar	(India) Peerless	Loan Return	
27 November 2019	FW	46	(India) Rohit Mirza	(India) Chennai City FC	None	
27 November 2019	MF	11	(Brazil) Bruno Pelissari			

== Pre-season ==
21 September 2019	(India) Gokulam Kerala	0-1	(India) Kerala football team	Kozhikode
16:00			Nasar	Stadium: EMS Corporation Stadium

27 September 2019	(India) Mumbai City	1-1	(India) Gokulam Kerala	Mumbai
18:00	Machado 40'		Joseph 67'	Stadium: Mumbai Football Arena,

1 October 2019	(India) Bengaluru	1-3	(India) Gokulam Kerala	Bellary
09:00	Lewis		Joseph; Kisekka; Rahul KP	Stadium: JSW Township

8 October 2019	(India) Chennaiyin	1-1	(India) Gokulam Kerala	Chennai
	Crivellaro		Ettienne	Stadium: Jawaharlal Nehru Stadium,

12 October 2019	(India) Gokulam Kerala	1-1	(India) Sports Academy Tirur	Malappuram
16:00	Kisekka		Goal	Stadium: Kottappadi Football Stadium,

16 October 2019	(India) Jamshedpur	2-0	(India) Gokulam Kerala	Jamshedpur
07.00	Jairu; Castel			Stadium: JRD Tata Sports Complex

== Competitions ==
Win Draw Loss Cancelled

=== Overview ===
Competition	First match	Last match	Starting round	Final position	Record							
Competition	First match	Last match	Starting round	Final position	Pld	W	D	L	GF	GA	GD	Win %
I League	30 November 2019	TBD	Matchday 1	-	11	5	2	4	14	13	+1	45.45
Durand Cup	8 August 2019	24 August 2019	Group Stage	Champions	5	4	1	0	14	3	+11	80.00
Sheikh Kamal Cup	19 October 2019	28 October 2019	Group Stage	Semi Final	4	2	1	1	7	4	+3	50.00
Super Cup	TBD	TBD		-	0	0	0	0	0	0	+0	—
Total					20	11	4	5	35	20	+15	55.00

Last updated: 12 February 2020.
Source: Competitions

== I-league ==
=== League table ===
Pos	Team	Pld	W	D	L	GF	GA	GD	Pts
3	Punjab	16	5	8	3	23	21	+2	23
4	Real Kashmir	15	6	4	5	16	14	+2	22
5	Gokulam Kerala	15	6	4	5	20	19	+1	22
6	TRAU	17	6	4	7	17	27	−10	22
7	Chennai City	15	5	5	5	20	21	−1	20

Source: I-league, RSSSF
Rules for classification: 1) points; 2) head-to-head points; 3) head-to-head goal difference; 4) goal difference; 5) number of goals scored; 6) drawing of lots

=== Result summary ===
Overall								Home						Away					
Pld	W	D	L	GF	GA	GD	Pts	W	D	L	GF	GA	GD	W	D	L	GF	GA	GD
3	2	0	1	4	3	+1	6	1	0	0	2	1	+1	1	0	1	2	2	0

=== Results by round ===
Round	1	2	3	4	5	6	7	8	9	10	11	12	13	14	15	16	17	18	19	20
Ground	H	A	A	A	H	A	A	A	H	H	H	A	A	H	H	A	H	A	A	H
Result	W	W	✖	L	D	L	W	L	W	D	L	W	L	D	D	W				
Position	2	2	3	5	5	6	4	6	4	4	6	3								

Updated to match(es) played on 2 February 2020. Source:
A = Away; H = Home; W = Win; D = Draw; L = Loss

=== Matches ===
Win Draw Loss

30.11.2019 1	Gokulam Kerala	2–1	NEROCA	Kozhikode
19.00 IST	Henry Kisekka 43'Marcus Joseph 49'		Taryk sampson 88'	Stadium: Kozhikode EMS Stadium; Attendance: 31,184

06.12.2019 2	Indian Arrows	0-1	Gokulam Kerala	Vasco da Gama, Goa
17.00 IST			Henry Kisekka 49'	Stadium: Tilak Maidan Stadium; Attendance: 1,217

TBD	Real Kashmir	postponed	Gokulam Kerala	Srinagar
14.00 IST				Stadium: TRC Turf Ground

16.12.2019 4	Mohun Bagan	2-1	Gokulam Kerala	Kalyani
17.00 IST	Gonzalez 24' ((pen.)), 48'; Mehta (yellow card) 28'; Beitia (yellow card) 73'; Gurjinder (yellow card) 78' (yellow-red card) 90+3'		Naocho (yellow card) 26'; Mayakkannam (yellow card) 63'; Amiri (yellow card) 79'; Joseph 45+3' ((pen.))	Stadium: Kalyani Stadium; Attendance: 14,137

04.01.2020 5	Gokulam Kerala	1–1	Aizawl	Kozhikode
19.00 IST			Collapse bled	Stadium: Kozhikode EMS Stadium; Attendance: 13,351

09.01.2020 6	Gokulam Kerala	2-3	Chennai City	Kozhikode
19.00 IST				Stadium: Kozhikode EMS Stadium; Attendance: 19,000

15.01.2020 7	Quess East Bengal	1-3	Gokulam Kerala	Kalyani
17.00 IST				Stadium: Kalyani Stadium; Attendance: 9,232

18.01.2020 8	Punjab	3–1	Gokulam Kerala	Chandigarh
17.00 IST				Stadium: Tau Devi Lal Stadium

26.01.2020 9	Gokulam Kerala	1–0	Churchill Brothers	Kozhikode
19.00 IST	Marcus Joseph 38'			Stadium: Kozhikode EMS Stadium; Attendance: 21,346

02.02.2020 10	Gokulam Kerala	1–1	TRAU	Kozhikode
19.00 IST				Stadium: Kozhikode EMS Stadium; Attendance: 10,135

08.02.2020 11	Gokulam Kerala	0-1	Real Kashmir	Kozhikode
19.00 IST				Stadium: Kozhikode EMS Stadium; Attendance: 15,184

12.02.2020 12	Chennai City	0-1	Gokulam Kerala	Coimbatore
19.00 IST			Marcus Joseph 79'	Stadium: Jawaharlal Nehru Stadium; Attendance: 4237

21.02.2020 13	NEROCA	3-2	Gokulam Kerala	Imphal
17.00 IST				Stadium: Khuman Lampak Main Stadium

29.02.2020 14	Gokulam Kerala	1-1	Punjab	Kozhikode
19.00 IST				Stadium: Kozhikode EMS Stadium; Man of the Match: D

03.03.2020 15	Gokulam Kerala	1-1	Quess East Bengal	Kozhikode
19.00 IST				Stadium: Kozhikode EMS Stadium

08.03.2020 16	Churchill Brothers	1-2	Gokulam Kerala	Margao
17.00 IST				Stadium: Fatorda Stadium

15.03.2020 17	Gokulam Kerala	–cancelled	Indian Arrows	Kozhikode
19.00 IST				Stadium: Kozhikode EMS Stadium

20.03.2020 18	TRAU	–cancelled	Gokulam Kerala	Imphal
17.00 IST				Stadium: Khuman Lampak Main Stadium

05.04.2020 19	Aizawl	–cancelled	Gokulam Kerala	Aizawl
14.00 IST				Stadium: Rajiv Gandhi Stadium

TBD 20	Gokulam Kerala	–cancelled	Mohun Bagan	Kozhikode
19.00 IST				Stadium: Kozhikode EMS Stadium

=== Attendances ===
Pos	Team	Total	High	Low	Average	Change
1	Gokulam Kerala	110,200	31,183	10,135	18,366	+23.9%

=== Durand Cup ===
==== Group stage ====
Pos	Team	Pld	W	D	L	GF	GA	GD	Pts	Qualification
1	Gokulam Kerala	3	3	0	0	11	1	+10	9	Knockout stage
2	Indian Air Force	3	1	1	1	1	3	−2	4	
3	TRAU	3	0	1	2	1	5	−4	1	
4	Chennaiyin	3	0	2	1	0	4	−4	2	

Updated to match(es) played on 18 August 2019. Source:
Rules for classification: Group stage tiebreakers

8 August 2019	Gokulam Kerala	4–0	Chennaiyin	Howrah
15:00	Marcus Joseph 39', 66', 75'; Henry Kisekka 68'	Report		Stadium: Howrah Stadium,

14 August 2019	Indian Air Force	0–3	Gokulam Kerala	Howrah
15:00			Joseph 43', 87'; Shibil 56'	Stadium: Howrah Stadium,

18 August 2019	TRAU	1-4	Gokulam Kerala	Howrah
15:00	Rger 89'		Marcus Joseph 57', 64', 79'; Andre Ettienne 71'	Stadium: Howrah Stadium,

==== Semi-final ====
21 August 2019	East Bengal	1-1 (2–3 p)	Gokulam Kerala	Kolkata
15.00	Samad Ali Mallick 17'		Marcus Joseph 90+2'	Stadium: Vivekananda Yuba Bharati Krirangan, Attendance: 18,162; Referee: Tejas Narvenkar
	Penalties
	Ralte (penalty missed); Colado (penalty missed); Pascual (penalty scored); Haokip (penalty scored); Naorem (penalty missed)		(penalty scored) Pelissari; (penalty missed) Meitei; (penalty scored) Jestin; (penalty scored) Lalromawia

==== Final ====
24 August 2019	Mohun Bagan	1–2	Gokulam Kerala	Kolkata
17:00	Chamorro 64'		Joseph 45+1' (pen.), 51'	Stadium: Salt Lake Stadium,

=== Sheikh Kamal Cup ===
The tournament is being organised by Chittagong Abahoni, a club based in Chittagong, and the Bangladesh Football Federation. Gokulam are in group 'B' along with the Bangladesh premiere league champions Bashundhara Kings, I League champions Chennai City FC and Malaysian club Terengganu Football Club.

The tournament has started on 19 October. Only the group winners and runners up will proceed to the knockout round.

==== Group stage ====
Pos	Team	Pld	W	D	L	GF	GA	GD	Pts	Qualification
1	(Malaysia) Terengganu F.C.	3	2	1	0	9	5	+4	7	Advance to Semi-Finals
2	(India) Gokulam Kerala F.C.	3	2	1	0	5	1	+4	7	Advance to Semi-Finals
3	(Bangladesh) Bashundhara Kings	3	1	0	2	6	9	−3	3	
4	(India) Chennai City FC	3	0	0	3	5	10	−5	0	

Rules for classification: 1) points; 2) head-to-head points; 3) head-to-head goal difference; 4) goal difference; 5) number of goals scored;

22 October 2019	Bashundhara Kings (Bangladesh)	1-3	(India) Gokulam Kerala F.C.	Chittagong, Bangladesh
19:00	Motin 74'		Henry 25', 46'; García 31'	Stadium: M. A. Aziz Stadium; Referee: Shraban Kurnar Tamang (Nepal)

24 October 2019	Terengganu F.C. (Malaysia)	0-0	(India) Gokulam Kerala F.C.	Chittagong, Bangladesh
19:00				Stadium: M. A. Aziz Stadium; Referee: Murad Alzawahreh (Jordan)

26 October 2019	Gokulam Kerala F.C. (India)	2−0	(India) Chennai City FC	Chittagong, Bangladesh
16:00	Lalromawia 8'; Kisekka 11'	Report		Stadium: M. A. Aziz Stadium; Referee: Jalal Uddin (Bangladesh)

==== Semi-finals ====
28 October 2019	Chittagong Abahani (Bangladesh)	3–2 (a.e.t.)	(India) Gokulam Kerala F.C.	Chittagong, Bangladesh
19:00	Brossou 47', 90'; Chinedu 105'	Report	Kisekka 29'; Joseph 80'	Stadium: M. A. Aziz Stadium; Referee: Murad Alzawahreh (Jordan)

== Current technical staff ==
As of 15 April 2018.

Position	Name
Head Coach	(Spain) Fernando Andres Santiago Valera
Technical Director	(India) Bino George
Goalkeeping Coach	(India) Fysal K Bappu
Fitness and conditioning Coach	(Brazil) Djair Miranda Garcia
Academy Manager	(Gibraltar) Joel Richard Williams

== Statistics ==
As of 02 Februaryt 2020.

=== Squad appearances and goals ===
No.	Pos.	Nat.	Name	2019 Durand Cup		Sheikh Kamal Cup		I-League		Super Cup		Total	
No.	Pos.	Nat.	Name	Apps	Starts	Apps	Starts	Apps	Starts	Apps	Starts	Apps	Starts
01	GK	(India)	Ubaid CK	4	4	4	4	6	6	0	0	14	14
02	LB	(India)	Naocha Singh	5	5	4	4	9	9	0	0	18	18
03	DF	(India)	Ashok Singh	1	1	0	0	0	0	0	0	1	1
04	DF	(Afghanistan)	Zohib Islam Amiri	-	-	-	-	6	5	0	0	6	5
05	DF	(Trinidad and Tobago)	Andre Ettienne	5	5	4	4	8	8	0	0	17	17
06	DF	(India)	Mohammed Irshad	5	5	4	4	8	8	0	0	17	17
08	MF	(Trinidad and Tobago)	Nathaniel García	-	-	3	3	9	8	0	0	12	11
10	FW	(Trinidad and Tobago)	Marcus Joseph	5	5	3	1	9	9	0	0	17	15
12	MF	(India)	Muhammed Rashid	3	3	4	4	4	4	0	0	11	11
13	DF	(India)	Dharmaraj Ravanan	-	-	3	3	0	0	0	0	3	3
14	FW	(India)	Malemngamba Meitei	4	4	0	0	5	2	0	0	9	6
15	DF	(India)	Mohamed Salah	3	1	2	0	1	0	0	0	6	1
16	FW	(India)	Salman K	-	-	1	0	2	2	0	0	3	2
18	DF	(India)	Wungngayam Muirang	-	-	2	0	4	4	0	0	6	4
21	GK	(India)	Vignash Bhaskaran	1	1	0	0	0	0	0	0	1	1
22	MF	(India)	Shibil Muhammed	4	4	-	-	5	1	0	0	9	5
23	MF	(India)	Nicholas Fernandes	-	-	-	-	1	0	0	0	1	0
24	DF	(India)	Jestin George	4	4	1	1	7	6	0	0	12	11
25	MF	(India)	Mayakkannan	1	1	4	4	6	5	0	0	11	10
27	DF	(India)	Sebastian Thangmuansang	4	4	4	4	8	8	0	0	16	16
29	FW	(India)	Lalromawia	3	2	4	3	8	1	0	0	15	6
31	FW	(Uganda)	Henry Kisekka	3	3	4	4	9	9	0	0	18	18
32	FW	(India)	Jithin MS	-	-	-	-	0	0	0	0	0	0
40	FW	(India)	Rahul KP	1	0	1	0	1	0	0	0	3	0
	DF	(India)	Alex Saji	-	-	-	-	0	0	0	0	0	0
	MF	(India)	Bijesh Balan	1	1	0	0	0	0	0	0	1	1
	MF	(India)	Myron Mendes	1	0	0	0	0	0	0	0	1	0
	DF	(India)	Sanju G	1	1	-	-	0	0	0	0	1	1
Players who have made an appearance or had a squad number this season but have left the club
11	MF	(Brazil)	Bruno Pelissari	5	0	-	-	-	-	0	0	5	0

=== Squad statistics ===
I-League	Super Cup	Total

=== Goal Scorers ===
Rank	No.	Pos.	Nat.	Name	Durand Cup	I League	Indian Super Cup	Sheikh Kamal Cup	Total
1	10	FW	(Trinidad and Tobago)	Marcus Joseph	11	6	0	1	18
2	31	FW	(Uganda)	Henry Kisekka	1	5	0	4	10
3	23	MF	(India)	Shibil Muhammed	1	2	0	0	3
3	05	DF	(Trinidad and Tobago)	Andre Ettienne	1	0	0	0	1
3	22	MF	(Trinidad and Tobago)	Nathaniel García	0	0	0	1	1
3	30	MF	(India)	Lalromawia	0	0	0	1	1
Own Goals					0	1	0	0	1
Total					14	14	0	7	35

=== Clean sheets ===
No.	Nation	Name	Durand Cup	Sheikh Kamal Cup	I-League	Super Cup	Total
1	(India)	Ubaid CK	2	2	3	0	7
44	(India)	Vigneswaran Bhaskaran	0	0	0	0	0
TOTAL			2	2	2	0	7

=== Disciplinary record ===
No.	Pos.	Nation	Name	I-League			Super Cup			Total		
No.	Pos.	Nation	Name	Yellow card	Second yellow card	Red card	Yellow card	Second yellow card	Red card	Yellow card	Second yellow card	Red card
5	DF	(Trinidad and Tobago)	Andre Ettienne	1	0	1	0	0	0	1	0	1
2	DF	(India)	Naocha singh	1	0	0	0	0	0	1	0	0
4	DF	(Afghanistan)	Zohib Islam Amiri	2	1	0	0	0	0	2	1	0
6	DF	(India)	Mohammed Irshad	2	1	0	0	0	0	2	1	0
8	MF	(Trinidad and Tobago)	Nathaniel García	2	0	0	0	0	0	2	0	0
10	FW	(Trinidad and Tobago)	Marcus Joseph	1	0	0	0	0	0	1	0	0
12	MF	(India)	Muhammed Rashid	2	0	0	0	0	0	2	0	0
14	FW	(India)	Malemngamba Meitei	1	0	0	0	0	0	1	0	0
21	GK	(India)	Vicky	2	0	0	0	0	0	2	0	0
25	MF	(India)	Mayakannan	2	0	0	0	0	0	2	0	0
	DF	(India)	Wungngayam Muirang	1	0	0	0	0	0	1	0	0
TOTAL				17	2	1	0	0	0	17	2	1

== See also ==
- 2019–20 in Indian football
- 2019–20 I-League
