= 2020–21 Indian Arrows season =

Indian football club season

Indian Arrows
2020–21 season
- Manager: Shanmugam Venkatesh
- Stadium: TBD
- I-League: TBD
- IFA Shield: Group Stage
- Top goalscorer: League: All: Gurkirat Singh (1 goal)
Home colours	Away colours

The 2020–21 season was the Indian Arrows' 7th competitive season in one of the top-flight league of Indian football, I-league. Indian Arrows was formed in 2010 on the behest on then Indian team coach, Bob Houghton, with the main goal of nurturing young talent in India in the hope of qualifying for 2018 FIFA World Cup in Russia. It was disbanded by AIFF in 2013 when their club sponsor, Pailan Group, could not financially support the group. But revived again in 2017–18 season immediately after FIFA U-17 World Cup.

== Technical staff ==
Position	Name
Head Coach	(India) Shanmugam Venkatesh
Team Manager	(India) Velu Dhayalamani
Assistant Coach	(India) Mahesh Gawli
Goalkeeping Coach	(India) Hameed
Team Analyst	(India) Prashanth Murthy
Physiotherapist	(India) Sulthan Basheer

== Squad ==
No.	Name	Nationality	Date of Birth (Age)
Goalkeepers
	Naveen Saini	(India) Punjab	29 August 2003 (age 23)
	Santosh Singh Irengbam	(India) Manipur	30 September 2003 (age 22)
	Syed Zahid Hussain Bukhari	(India) Jammu and Kashmir	16 April 2003 (age 23)
	Ahan Prakash	(India) Karnataka	
Defenders
	Abdul Hanan	(India) Jammu and Kashmir	4 August 2004 (age 22)
	Kushang Subba	(India) Sikkim	8 August 2003 (age 23)
	Sajad Hussain Parray	(India) Jammu and Kashmir	25 April 2003 (age 23)
	Praful Kumar	(India) Karnataka	10 June 2003 (age 23)
	Evan Thapa	(India) Sikkim	30 December 2003 (age 22)
	Tankadhar Bag	(India) Odisha	7 December 2003 (age 22)
	Dipu Halder	(India) West Bengal	9 May 2003 (age 23)
	Brijesh Giri	(India) West Bengal	7 December 2003 (age 22)
	Leewan Castanha	(India) Goa	
	Gurkirat Singh	(India) Chandigarh	16 July 2003 (age 23)
Midfielders
	Pragyan Medhi	(India) Assam	8 January 2004 (age 22)
	Lalchhanhima Chawnghlut	(India) Mizoram	28 February 2003 (age 23)
	Harsh Shailesh Patre	(India) Goa	25 January 2003 (age 23)
	Lalchhanhima Sailo	(India) Mizoram	3 March 2003 (age 23)
	Ricky John Shabong	(India) Meghalaya	29 December 2002 (age 23)
Forwards
	Vanlalruatfela Thlacheu	(India) Mizoram	1 November 2003 (age 22)
	Parthib Sunder Gogoi	(India) Assam	16 July 2003 (age 23)
	Arya Gandharva	(India) Maharashtra	
	Mohamed L. Ahamed	(India)	
	Tapan Haldar	(India) West Bengal	
	Vishva Vijay Shinde	(India) Maharashtra	11 July 2003 (age 23)

Last updated: 19 November 2020

== Competitions ==
=== Overview ===
Competition	First match	Last match	Starting round	Final position	Record							
Competition	First match	Last match	Starting round	Final position	Pld	W	D	L	GF	GA	GD	Win %
I-League	10 January 2021	10 January 2021	11th		1	0	0	1	2	5	−3	0.00
IFA Shield	6 December 2020	9 December 2020	Group Stage	Group Stage	2	0	1	1	1	3	−2	0.00
Total					3	0	1	2	3	8	−5	0.00

Source: Competitions

=== I-League ===
==== League table (Phase-1) ====
Pos	Team	Pld	W	D	L	GF	GA	GD	Pts	Qualification or relegation
7	Aizawl	10	4	3	3	13	8	+5	15	Demote to Relegation Stage (Group B)
8	Sudeva Delhi	10	2	3	5	11	11	0	9	Demote to Relegation Stage (Group B)
9	Chennai City	10	3	0	7	7	19	−12	9	Demote to Relegation Stage (Group B)
10	NEROCA	10	2	2	6	13	15	−2	8	Demote to Relegation Stage (Group B)
11	Indian Arrows	10	1	1	8	6	31	−25	4	Demote to Relegation Stage (Group B)

Source: I-League
Rules for classification: 1) points; 2) head-to-head points; 3) head-to-head goal difference; 4) goal difference; 5) number of goals scored; 6) drawing of lots

==== Relegation stage (Group B) ====
Pos	Team	Pld	W	D	L	GF	GA	GD	Pts
1	Aizawl	14	7	3	4	21	12	+9	24
2	Sudeva Delhi	14	5	3	6	16	14	+2	18
3	Chennai City	14	5	0	9	16	25	−9	15
4	Indian Arrows	14	3	1	10	11	38	−27	10
5	NEROCA	14	2	2	10	14	22	−8	8

Updated to match(es) played on 25 March 2021. Source: I-League
Rules for classification: 1) points; 2) head-to-head points; 3) head-to-head goal difference; 4) goal difference; 5) number of goals scored; 6) drawing of lots

==== Results by matchday ====
Matchday	1	2	3	4	5
Ground	H	A	H	A	A
Result	L	L	L	D	L
Position	11	11	11	11	11

Updated to match(es) played on 6 December 2020. Source:
A = Away; H = Home; W = Win; D = Draw; L = Loss

==== IFA Shield ====
Group C

Pos	Team	Pld	W	D	L	GF	GA	GD	Pts	
1	George Telegraph	2	2	0	0	4	1	+3	6	Advance to the quarterfinals
2	Southern Samity	2	0	1	1	2	3	−1	1	Advance to the quarterfinals
3	Indian Arrows	2	0	1	1	1	3	−2	1	

Source: ifawb.org

== Results & Schedule ==
Win Draw Loss

=== IFA Shield ===
6 December 2020 IFA Shield Group Stage	Indian Arrows	1–1	Southern Samity	Kolkata
	Gurkirat Singh	Report	Sujit Saren	Stadium: Mohun Bagan Ground

9 December 2020 IFA Shield Group Stage	Indian Arrows	0–2	George Telegraph	Howrah
				Stadium: Sailen Manna Stadium

=== I-League ===
10 January 2021 1.1	Indian Arrows	2–5	Churchill Brothers	Kalyani
	Thlacheu 9' Gurkirat Singh 22' (pen.)	Report	Luka Majcen 2', 75' Clayvin Zuniga 35', 59', 69'	Stadium: Kalyani Stadium

14 January 2021 1.2	Sudeva Delhi	3–0	Indian Arrows	Kalyani
	Lewis 40'; M. Singh 49'; Kharpan 66'			Stadium: Kalyani Stadium

20 January 2021 1.3	Indian Arrows	0–4	NEROCA	Kalyani
			García 27', 65'; Kallon 30'; Lhungdim 72'	Stadium: Kalyani Stadium

24 January 2021 1.4	Aizawl	1–1	Indian Arrows	Kalyani
	Kasagga 12'		Parray 90+3'	Stadium: Kalyani Stadium

29 January 2021 1.5	Chennai City	1–0	Indian Arrows	Kalyani
	Škrijelj 63'			Stadium: Kalyani Stadium

4 February 2021 1.6	Real Kashmir	6–0	Indian Arrows	Kalyani
	Dipanda 42', 73'; Adefemi 51'; Amiri 61'; Lyngdoh 80'; Farooq 86'			Stadium: Kalyani Stadium

9 February 2021 1.7	Indian Arrows	1–2	Punjab	Kalyani
	Fernandes 85'		Diawara 35', 56'	Stadium: Kalyani Stadium

14 February 2021 1.8	Indian Arrows	1–0	Mohammedan	Kolkata
	G. Singh 26'			Stadium: Salt Lake Stadium

19 February 2021 1.9	Gokulam Kerala	4–0	Indian Arrows	Kalyani
	Benny 49'; Antwi 51' (pen.); Lalromawia 78'; Ronald 90+5'			Stadium: Kalyani Stadium

20 February 2021 1.10	Indian Arrows	1–5	TRAU	Kalyani
	Patre 42'		B. Singh 14', 50'; Khongreiwoshi 16'; Tursunov 74'; Horam 84'	Stadium: Kalyani Stadium

==== Phase-2 ====
6 March 2021 2.1	Indian Arrows	3–0	NEROCA	Kalyani
	Patre 17', 90+6'; Thlacheu 51'			Stadium: Kalyani Stadium

11 March 2021 2.2	Indian Arrows	0–5	Chennai City	Kalyani
			Rajesh 36'; Velmurugan 49', 90+1'; Dhas 59'; Hussain 85'	Stadium: Kalyani Stadium

16 March 2021 2.3	Aizawl	1–2	Indian Arrows	Kolkata
	Malsawmtluanga 22'		Gogoi 11'; Sailo 36'	Stadium: Kishore Bharati Krirangan

20 March 2021 2.4	Sudeva	1–0	Indian Arrows	Kolkata
	Paul 40'			Stadium: Salt Lake Stadium

== Statistics ==
=== Goal Scorers ===
Goal Scorers for Indian Arrows in 2020–21 season
Rank	No.	Pos.	Name	Goals
1		DF	Gurkirat Singh	2
2		FW	Vanlalruatfela Thlacheu	1
			Own goals	0
Total				3
