= TFO (disambiguation) =

TFO (Télévision française de l'Ontario) is a French-language public television channel in Ontario, Canada.

TFO may also refer to:

- Tandem Free Operation, in mobile telephony
- TCP Fast Open, in computer networking
- Tefaro language, by ISO 639-3 language code
- The Florida Orchestra, an American orchestra based in the Tampa Bay area
- Turun filharmoninen orkesteri, a Finnish orchestra
