= Macarton Nickson =

Indian footballer

Personal information
- Full name: Macarton Louis Nickson
- Date of birth: 19 March 2004 (age 22)
- Place of birth: Karnataka, India
- Position: Defensive midfielder

Team information
- Current team: NorthEast United
- Number: 15

Youth career
- 2012: Root FC (Bengaluru)
- 2013–2021: Bengaluru FC
- 2023–2024: NorthEast United

Senior career*
Years	Team	Apps	(Gls)
2021–2022	Indian Arrows	3	(0)
2022–2023	Bengaluru United	9	(0)
2023–	NorthEast United	37	(2)

International career^{‡}
2025–	India U23	5	(0)
2025–	India	6	(0)
- * Club domestic league appearances and goals as of 17:38, 23 March 2025 (UTC) ‡ National team caps and goals as of 22:00, 3 October 2026 (UTC)

Macarton Louis Nickson (born 19 March 2004) is an Indian professional footballer who plays as a defensive midfielder for the Indian Super League club NorthEast United.

== Club career ==
Nickson started playing football at the age of six with Root FC, based in Bengaluru. He then joined Bengaluru FC’s youth academy where he played for eight years. At the age of seventeen, he was called up in the squad of Indian Arrows for the 2020–21 I-League, then top-flight league of Indian football. He played few matches for the Arrows before moving to Bengaluru United for the 2022–23 I-League 2, then third division of Indian football.

=== NorthEast United ===
For the 2023–24 season he joined Indian Super League club NorthEast United FC as a defensive midfielder. He won the 2024 Durand Cup with NorthEast United.

== International career ==
On 22 March 2025, the then India national team head coach Manolo Márquez announced Nickson's inclusion in the squad for the third round of AFC Asian Cup qualification matches.

== Career statistics ==
=== Club ===
As of match played on 30 March 2025

Appearances and goals by club, season and competition
Club	Season	League			Super Cup		Durand Cup		Continental		Total	
Club	Season	Division	Apps	Goals	Apps	Goals	Apps	Goals	Apps	Goals	Apps	Goal
Indian Arrows	2021–22	I-League	3	0	0	0	0	0	0	0	3	0
Bengaluru United	2022–23	I-League 2	9	0	0	0	0	0	0	0	9	0
NorthEast United	2023–24	Indian Super League	14	0	3	0	0	0	0	0	17	0
NorthEast United	2024–25	Indian Super League	21	2	0	0	3	0	0	0	24	2
Career total			47	2	3	0	3	0	0	0	53	2

=== International ===
As of 3 October 2026

National team	Year	Apps	Goals
India	2025	2	0
India	2026	4	0
Total		6	0

== Personal life ==
Nickson was born on 19 March 2004, in Karnataka, India. He is the son of Louis Nickson, a former India international football player. Nickson did his schooling from Bengaluru-based St. Joseph's Indian Primary School.

== Honours ==
NorthEast United

- Durand Cup: 2024, 2025

India

- SAFF Championship: 2026
