= TRAU =

Audio format converter

A Transcoder and Rate Adaptation Unit (TRAU) performs transcoding for speech channels and RA (Rate Adaptation) for data channels in the GSM network. TRAU is the data rate conversion unit. The PSTN/ISDN switch is a switch for 64 kbit/s voice. Later technology permitted decreasing the bit rate (in the GSM radio interface, it is 16 kbit/s for full rate and 8 kbit/s for half rate). Since MSC is basically a PSTN/ISDN switch, its bit rate is 64 kbit/s. That is why a rate conversion is required between the BSC and MSC.

Transcoding is the compression of speech data from 64 kbit/s to 13, 12.2, or 6.5 kbit/s in the case of FR, EFR, or HR (respectively) speech coding. Rate adaptation without transcoding allows Tandem Free Operation (TFO), allowing the original encoded speech data to be carried in a 64 kbit/s channel. TFO offers benefits because transcoding can degrade speech quality and requires computational resources.

TRAU was also the term used for the frame format used in transport of the compressed bits from these speech coders.

== Brief explanation ==
For an MS-to-MS call, the transmission path covers the radio access network (RAN) as well as the core network (CN). Since the transmission modes and coding standards are different for RAN and CN, speech data is converted/transcoded at the transition points from RAN to CN. This conversion is performed in the TRAU network element that connects RAN and CN.

16 kbit/s for FR (Full Rate), Redundancy (Channel Coding)= 9.8 kbit/s
=> Gross data rate after adding redundancy = 22.8 kbit/s
=> 12.2 kbit/s for EFR (Enhanced Full rate) => Gross data rate after adding redundancy = 11.4 kbit/s.

== See also ==
- GSM Full Rate
- GSM Half Rate
- GSM Enhanced Full Rate
- GSM Adaptive Multi-Rate
