= Zodingliana Ralte =

Indian footballer

Personal information
- Full name: Zodingliana Adinga Ralte
- Date of birth: 5 May 1995 (age 31)
- Place of birth: Mizoram, India
- Height: 1.74 m (5 ft 8 1/2 in)
- Positions: Left back; winger

Team information
- Current team: Mohammedan
- Number: 14

Youth career
- Mizoram
- 2010–2013: Shillong Lajong

Senior career*
| Years | Team | Apps | (Gls) |
| 2013–2018 | Shillong Lajong | 30 | (2) |
| 2014 | → NorthEast United (loan) | 10 | (0) |
| 2015 | → Delhi Dynamos (loan) | 12 | (0) |
| 2016 | → Pune City (loan) | 1 | (0) |
| 2018–2019 | Goa B | 2 | (0) |
| 2019–2020 | NEROCA | 11 | (0) |
| 2020–2022 | Gokulam Kerala | 18 | (1) |
| 2022–2023 | Aizawl | 19 | (0) |
| 2023– | Mohammedan | 0 | (0) |

International career
| 2008 | India U14 | | |
| 2010 | India U16 | | |
| 2013 | India U19 | | |
- * Club domestic league appearances and goals as of 21:22, 14 May 2022 (UTC)

Zodingliana Adinga Ralte (born 5 May 1995) is an Indian professional footballer who plays as a defender or winger for I-League club Mohammedan.

== Career ==
=== Early career ===
Born in Mizoram, Tochhawng started playing football from the age of seven in his village. He was eventually selected to join the Mizoram U14 team for a football festival in Goa. From there, Tochhawng was selected for various national team events before joining Shillong Lajong.

=== Shillong Lajong ===
On 23 October 2013, Tochhawng made his professional debut for Shillong Lajong in an I-League match against Mumbai. He came on as a 90th-minute substitute for Cornell Glenn and he earned a yellow-card as Shillong Lajong won 3–2. During 2015-16 Shillong Lajong pre season, Zodingliana picked up injury and due to this he missed one months of I-League. He returned on 13 February 2016 and played first game for Lajong in 2015–16 I-League season against Aizawl FC which ended in a goal-less draw.

==== NorthEast United (loan) ====
Over the summer of 2014, it was announced that Tochhawng, along with 83 other Indian players, had signed for an Indian Super League team with Tochhawng joining Shillong Lajong affiliated NorthEast United on loan. He made his debut for NorthEast United on 13 October 2014 against Kerala Blasters. He started the match and played the full-match as NorthEast United won 1–0.

==== Delhi Dynamos (loan) ====
On 10 July 2015, ISL club Delhi Dynamos has signed Tochhawng in Domestic ISL draft for 2015. He made 12 appearances for Delhi Dynamos in whole season as a left back player.

==== Pune City (loan) ====
On 25 May 2016, ISL club FC Pune City has signed Tochhawng on loan from Shillong Lajong for the third edition of Hero ISL. On 12 October 2016, he made his debut for FC Pune City against his former club NorthEast United FC.

==== FC Goa Reserves ====
On 1 July 2018, He has signed for FC Goa Reserves in the I-League 2nd Division . On 21 January 2019, he made his debut for FC Goa Reserves against Hindustan F.C.

=== NEROCA ===
On 9 September 2019 he signed for NEROCA

== Career statistics ==
=== Club ===
As of 13 April 2023

| Club | Season | League | | | Cup | | AFC | | Total | |
| Club | Season | Division | Apps | Goals | Apps | Goals | Apps | Goals | Apps | Goals |
|---|---|---|---|---|---|---|---|---|---|---|
| Shillong Lajong | 2013–14 | I-League | 2 | 0 | 0 | 0 | — | | 2 | 0 |
| Shillong Lajong | 2014–15 | I-League | 16 | 2 | 0 | 0 | — | | 16 | 2 |
| Shillong Lajong | 2015–16 | I-League | 10 | 0 | 0 | 0 | — | | 10 | 0 |
| Shillong Lajong | 2016–17 | I-League | 2 | 0 | 0 | 0 | — | | 1 | 0 |
| Shillong Lajong | Shillong Lajong total | | 30 | 2 | 0 | 0 | 0 | 0 | 30 | 2 |
| NorthEast United (loan) | 2014 | Indian Super League | 10 | 0 | 0 | 0 | — | | 10 | 0 |
| Delhi Dynamos (loan) | 2015 | Indian Super League | 12 | 0 | 0 | 0 | — | | 12 | 0 |
| Pune City (loan) | 2016 | Indian Super League | 1 | 0 | 0 | 0 | — | | 1 | 0 |
| Goa B | 2018–19 | I-League 2nd Division | 4 | 0 | 0 | 0 | — | | 4 | 0 |
| NEROCA | 2019–20 | I-League | 11 | 0 | 0 | 0 | — | | 11 | 0 |
| Gokulam Kerala | 2020–21 | I-League | 7 | 1 | 0 | 0 | — | | 7 | 1 |
| Gokulam Kerala | 2021–22 | I-League | 11 | 0 | 9 (Note: Appearance(s) in Durand Cup) (Note: Appearance(s) in IFA Shield) | 0 | 1 (Note: Appearance(s) in AFC Cup) | 0 | 21 | 0 |
| Gokulam Kerala | Gokulam Kerala total | | 18 | 1 | 9 | 0 | 1 | 0 | 28 | 1 |
| Aizawl | 2022–23 | I-League | 19 | 0 | 1 (Note: Appearance(s) in Super Cup) | 0 | — | | 20 | 0 |
| Mohammedan | 2023–24 | I-League | 0 | 0 | 0 | 0 | — | | 0 | 0 |
| Career total | | | 105 | 3 | 10 | 0 | 1 | 0 | 116 | 3 |

== Honours ==
Gokulam Kerala

- I-League: 2020–21, 2021–22
