= Mason Robertson =

Scottish footballer (born 1994)

Personal information
- Date of birth: 23 July 1994 (age 32)
- Place of birth: Glasgow, Scotland
- Position: Striker

College career
Years	Team	Apps	(Gls)
2013–2016	Washington Huskies	52	(14)

Senior career*
Years	Team	Apps	(Gls)
2017	Stenhousemuir	12	(2)
2017–2018	Peterhead	27	(4)
2018–2022	Real Kashmir	58	(25)
- * Club domestic league appearances and goals

Mason Robertson (born 23 July 1994) is a Scottish professional footballer who plays as a striker.

== Earlier career ==
Robertson started playing football during his college days and between 2013 and 2016, he played for the Washington Huskies men's soccer team and appeared in a total of 52 games, scoring 14 goals with 117 shots.

== Club career ==
=== Stenhousemuir ===
In 2017, Robertson began his professional football career at Scottish League Two side Stenhousemuir. The youngster's talent impressed Peterhead's manager Jim McInally as he snapped him up in the summer of the same year. He appeared in 12 league matches for the club, scoring 2 goals.

Then 23-year-old Robertson had trials with Championship sides like Dundee United and Queen of the South before joining Stenhousemuir. His stint at Stenhousemuir earned him a trial opportunity at Kilmarnock FC. With the trial at Rugby Park the youngster started settling into senior football and eventually joined Peterhead FC.

=== Peterhead ===
After his spell with Stenhousemuir, he moved to Peterhead FC in the Scottish League One. During the 2017–2018 season, he scored 4 goals in 27 league matches.

He impressed with his performances at Peterhead and after plying his trade for 37 games, he had a new contract from his manager and the Toons were expecting him to remain with the club. But he moved to India to play for newly promoted to I-League club Real Kashmir, managed by David Robertson.

=== Real Kashmir ===
In July 2018, Robertson was signed by his father David Robertson for Real Kashmir in the I-League. Robertson made his professional debut in India, playing for Real Kashmir in the I-League against Minerva Punjab FC, winning 1–0.

He appeared with the Snow Leopards in 17 games of their debut season and scored 4 goals. Real Kashmir achieved the third place in the 2018–19 I-League. Later he scored 6 goals in the 2019–20 season and 9 goals in the 2020–21 season.

Under the stewardship of his father, David, the 25-year-old centre-back oversaw two fruitful, encouraging seasons; the club finished third in 2018–19 after being promoted to the first tier of competition, and when the COVID-19 crisis halted the 2019-20 I-League season in March, it was positioned fourth, with a realistic possibility of finishing second.

With Real Kashmir, he won the prestigious 2020 IFA Shield defeating George Telegraph in Kolkata. Since 2019 under his captaincy, Real Kashmir competed in various domestic competitions including the I-League, Hero Super Cup and Kashmir Invitational Cup.

== Career statistics ==
=== Club ===
As of 4 May 2022

Appearances and goals by club, season and competition
Club	Season	League			Cup		Continental		Other		Total	
Club	Season	Division	Apps	Goals	Apps	Goals	Apps	Goals	Apps	Goals	Apps	Goals
Stenhousemuir	2016–17	League One	12	2	0	0	–		–		12	2
Peterhead	2017–18	League Two	27	4	8 (Note: Appearance(s) in Scottish League Cup) (Note: Appearance(s) in Scottish Challenge Cup) (Note: Appearance(s) in Scottish Cup)	1	–		2 (Note: Appearance(s) in League One play-offs)	2	37	7
Real Kashmir	2018–19	I-League	17	4	1 (Note: Appearance(s) in Super Cup)	1	–		–		18	5
Real Kashmir	2019–20	I-League	14	6	0	0	–		–		14	6
Real Kashmir	2020–21	I-League	13	6	0	0	–		–		13	6
Real Kashmir	2021–22	I-League	14	9	0	0	–		–		14	9
Career total			97	31	9	2	0	0	2	2	108	35

== Personal life ==
Robertson was born in Glasgow, Scotland and is the son of David Robertson, and Kym. His father David is the former Aberdeen, Rangers, Leeds United and Montrose defender, and former Real Kashmir manager. Robertson has completed his higher education at the University of Washington before turning into a professional footballer.

According to Robertson, who is happy with his career and life in Kashmir; "Growing up as a striker and a winger, I loved to score. It wasn't much of a change. I had been playing as a centre back for the last three years. So I'm used to switching positions and my main goal is to help the team as much as I can."

== Honours ==
Real Kashmir

- Kashmir Invitational Cup: 2018
- IFA Shield: 2020, 2021

Individual

- IFA Shield — Chuni Goswami Memorial Award for Man of the tournament: 2020
