= Mohamed Awal =

Ghanaian footballer

Personal information
- Full name: Mohamed Awal
- Date of birth: 1 May 1988 (age 38)
- Place of birth: Accra, Ghana
- Height: 1.90 m (6 ft 3 in)
- Position: Centre-back

Youth career
- Feyenoord Academy Ghana

Senior career*
| Years | Team | Apps | (Gls) |
| 2008–2010 | Feyenoord Academy Ghana | | |
| 2010 | ASEC Mimosas (loan) | 5 | (0) |
| 2011–2012 | Asante Kotoko | | |
| 2012–2015 | Maritzburg United | 57 | (1) |
| 2015 | Al-Shabab | 9 | (0) |
| 2015–2016 | Raja Casablanca | 23 | (1) |
| 2016–2017 | Arsenal Tula | 0 | (0) |
| 2017 | Asante Kotoko | 16 | (0) |
| 2018 | Al-Fahaheel | ? | (?) |
| 2018–2019 | Al-Ansar | 9 | (0) |
| 2019–2020 | Wolkite City | 26 | (11) |
| 2020–2021 | Gokulam Kerala | 14 | (0) |
| 2021–2023 | Sreenidi Deccan | 39 | (1) |

International career^{‡}
| 2013–2017 | Ghana | 7 | (1) |
- * Club domestic league appearances and goals as of 17:33, 5 March 2023 (UTC) ‡ National team caps and goals as of 12 August 2017

Mohamed Awal (born 1 May 1988) is a Ghanaian professional footballer who last played as a defender.

== Club career ==
Awal began his career with the Feyenoord Academy. On 10 July 2010, he joined ASEC Mimosas on loan. After his return in November 2010 to Feyenoord Academy, he was sold to Asante Kotoko. In August 2012, Awal joined South African Premier Soccer League club Maritzburg United.

On 8 August 2016, He signed a one-year contract with Arsenal Tula, with the option of a second, with Arsenal Tula. His previous club, Raja Casablanca, did not send the transfer documents in time for Awal to be registered for Arsenal Tula with the Russian Football Premier League by the 31 August deadline, and it has been reported on 7 September 2016 that Arsenal is planning on cancelling his contract.

At the end of November 2019, Awal joined Wolkite City F.C. in Ethiopia.

=== Gokulam Kerala ===
On 20 November 2020, it was announced that I-League club Gokulam Kerala have completed the signing of Awal. He was appointed captain of the team for the 2020–21 season.

On 6 December 2020, he made his debut for the club in the 2020 IFA Shield against United SC, which ended in a surprising 1–0 defeat. He made his I-League debut, on 9 January 2021 against Chennai City, which ended in a 2–1 defeat.

He was instrumental for the team throughout the season as he led Gokulam Kerala to their first-ever I-League trophy. After finishing fourth in group stage with six wins in twelve matches, they moved to the championship stage. They finished their maiden league campaign in third place with 32 points in 18 matches, and won the last match against Churchill Brothers on 14 May.

=== Sreenidi Deccan ===
On 24 September 2021, Awal moved to one of the new I-League entrants, Sreenidi Deccan.

On 15 December 2021, he made his debut for the club, against Real Kashmir in the 2021 IFA Shield final, which ended in a 2–1 defeat. He made his I-League debut for the club, on 27 December 2021 against NEROCA, in their 3–2 defeat.

== Career statistics ==
=== Club ===
As of 12 April 2023

| Club | Season | League | | | Cup | | Continental | | Total | |
| Club | Season | Division | Apps | Goals | Apps | Goals | Apps | Goals | Apps | Goal |
|---|---|---|---|---|---|---|---|---|---|---|
| ASEC Mimosas | 2010 | Ivorian Ligue 1 | 5 | 0 | 0 | 0 | – | | 5 | 0 |
| Maritzburg United | 2012–13 | South African Premier Division | 24 | 0 | 4 (Note: Appearance(s) in Telkom Knockout) (Note: Appearance(s) in Nedbank Cup) | 0 | – | | 28 | 0 |
| Maritzburg United | 2013–14 | South African Premier Division | 22 | 0 | 5 | 0 | – | | 27 | 0 |
| Maritzburg United | 2014–15 | South African Premier Division | 11 | 1 | 1 | 0 | – | | 12 | 1 |
| Maritzburg United | Total | | 57 | 1 | 10 | 0 | 0 | 0 | 67 | 1 |
| Al-Shabab | 2014–15 | Saudi Professional League | 9 | 0 | 2 (Note: Appearance(s) in King Cup) | 0 | 6 (Note: Appearance(s) in AFC Champions League) | 0 | 17 | 0 |
| Raja Casablanca | 2015–16 | Botola | 23 | 1 | 0 | 0 | – | | 23 | 1 |
| Asante Kotoko | 2017 | Ghana Premier League | 16 | 0 | 0 | 0 | – | | 16 | 0 |
| Gokulam Kerala | 2020–21 | I-League | 14 | 0 | 3 (Note: Appearance(s) in IFA Shield) | 0 | – | | 17 | 0 |
| Sreenidi Deccan | 2021–22 | I-League | 18 | 0 | 0 | 0 | – | | 18 | 0 |
| Sreenidi Deccan | 2022–23 | I-League | 21 | 1 | 2 (Note: Appearance(s) in Super Cup) | 0 | – | | 23 | 1 |
| Sreenidi Deccan | Total | | 39 | 1 | 2 | 0 | 0 | 0 | 41 | 1 |
| Career total | | | 163 | 3 | 17 | 0 | 6 | 0 | 186 | 3 |

== International career ==
On 31 December 2010, he was called for the Senior Ghana national football team for a CAF Tournament. He played in the 2014 World cup qualifiers alongside the African Cup of Nations.

=== International ===
As of matches played till 12 August 2017

| National team | Year | Apps | Goals |
|---|---|---|---|
| Ghana | 2013 | 2 | 0 |
| Ghana | 2014 | 2 | 0 |
| Ghana | 2015 | 1 | 0 |
| Ghana | 2017 | 2 | 1 |
| Total | | 7 | 1 |

=== International goals ===
Scores and results list Ghana's goal tally first.

| No | Date | Venue | Cap | Opponent | Score | Result | Competition | Ref. |
|---|---|---|---|---|---|---|---|---|
| 1. | 25 May 2017 | Accra Sports Stadium, Accra, Ghana | 6 | Benin | 1–1 | 1–1 | Friendly | |

== Honours ==
Gokulam Kerala

- I-League: 2020–21

Sreenidi Deccan

- IFA Shield runner-up: 2021

Ghana

- Africa Cup of Nations runner-up: 2015
