= Sriram Boopathi =

Indian footballer

Personal information
- Full name: Sriram Boopathi
- Date of birth: 17 January 1994 (age 32)
- Place of birth: Salem, Tamil Nadu, India
- Height: 1.68 m (5 ft 6 in)
- Position: Central midfielder

Youth career
- –2018: Chennai Customs RC

Senior career*
Years	Team	Apps	(Gls)
2018–2021	Chennai City	34	(1)
2021–2023	Sreenidi Deccan	21	(0)
- * Club domestic league appearances and goals as of 18:53, 29 January 2023 (UTC)

Sriram Boopathi (born 17 January 1994) is an Indian professional footballer who plays as a central midfielder.

== Career ==
He made his professional debut for the Chennai City F.C. against Shillong Lajong on 29 December 2018, He started and played full match as Chennai City won 6–1.

== Career statistics ==
As of 26 December 2019

Club	Season	League			Cup		Continental		Total	
Club	Season	Division	Apps	Goals	Apps	Goals	Apps	Goals	Apps	Goals
Chennai City F.C.	2018–19	I-League	6	0	0	0	–	–	6	0
Chennai City F.C.	2019–20	I-League	5	0	0	0	—	—	5	0
Career total			11	0	0	0	0	0	11	0
