= Suraj Rawat =

Indian footballer (born 1999)

Personal information
- Date of birth: 15 March 1999 (age 27)
- Place of birth: Sikkim, India
- Position: Midfielder

Team information
- Current team: FC Bengaluru United
- Number: 36

Youth career
- Royal Wahingdoh

Senior career*
Years	Team	Apps	(Gls)
2018–2019	Kerala Blasters B	12	(5)
2018–2020	Kerala Blasters	2	(0)
2019–2020	Indian Arrows	4	(0)
2020–2021	Mohammedan	15	(1)
2021–2023	Sreenidi Deccan	9	(0)
2023–	Bengaluru United		
- * Club domestic league appearances and goals as of 12:43, 14 May 2022 (UTC)

Suraj Rawat (born 15 March 1999), is an Indian professional footballer who plays as a midfielder for Bengaluru United in the I-League 2.

== Career ==
In December 2017, Rawat signed for the Kerala Blasters of the Indian Super League. During the 2017–18 season, Rawat played for the Kerala Blasters Reserves in the I-League 2nd Division. The next season, Rawat was selected for the Kerala Blasters senior squad.

On 7 December 2018, Rawat made his professional debut in a league match against Pune City. He came on as a 89th–minute substitute for Halicharan Narzary as Kerala Blasters lost 0–1.

== Career statistics ==
=== Club ===
As of 14 May 2022

Club	Season	League			Cup		AFC		Total	
Club	Season	Division	Apps	Goals	Apps	Goals	Apps	Goals	Apps	Goals
Kerala Blasters B	2017–18	I-League 2nd Division	9	5	0	0	—		9	5
Kerala Blasters B	2018–19	I-League 2nd Division	3	0	0	0	—		3	0
Kerala Blasters	2018–19	Indian Super League	2	0	0	0	—		2	0
Indian Arrows	2019–20	I-League	4	0	0	0	—		4	0
Mohammedan	2020	I-League 2nd Division	4	0	0	0	—		4	0
Mohammedan	2020–21	I-League	11	1	0	0	—		11	1
Sreenidi Deccan	2021–22	I-League	9	0	0	0	—		9	0
Career total			42	6	0	0	0	0	42	6
