= Fredsan Marshall =

Indian footballer

Personal information
- Full name: Fredsan Marshall
- Date of birth: 26 December 1994 (age 31)
- Place of birth: Goa, India
- Positions: Midfielder; winger

Team information
- Current team: Ambelim Sports Club
- Number: 9

Youth career
- Brazil Football Academy
- Dempo

Senior career*
Years	Team	Apps	(Gls)
- Vasco
2018–2021	Churchill Brothers	18	(1)
2021–2022	Sreenidi Deccan	10	(1)
2022–2023	Gokulam Kerala Reserves		
2023	ARA FC		
2023–2024	Aizawl FC	4	(0)
2024–	Ambelim Sports Club		

International career
2025–	India (futsal)		
- * Club domestic league appearances and goals

Fredsan Marshall (born 26 December 1994) is an Indian professional footballer who plays as a midfielder or winger. He is also a member of the India national futsal team.

== Club career ==
Born in Goa, Marshall began his career as part of the Brazil Football Academy, before joining Dempo under-20 side. He then played for local side Vasco, before joining Goa side for Premier Futsal in 2016.

=== Churchill Brothers ===
For the 2018–19 season, Marshall joined the I-League club Churchill Brothers. He made his debut for the club on 28 October against Punjab FC.

Marshall scored his first goal for Churchill Brothers on 5 March 2021 against Real Kashmir. His second half stoppage goal was decisive in a 2–1 victory.

== Career statistics ==
=== Club ===
As of 10 May 2022

Club	Season	League			Cup		AFC		Total	
Club	Season	Division	Apps	Goals	Apps	Goals	Apps	Goals	Apps	Goals
Churchill Brothers	2018–19	I-League	6	0	0	0	—		6	0
Churchill Brothers	2019–20	I-League	0	0	0	0	—		0	0
Churchill Brothers	2020–21	I-League	12	1	0	0	—		12	1
Sreenidi Deccan	2021–22	I-League	10	1	0	0	—		10	1
Career total			28	2	0	0	0	0	28	2
