= 2020 IFA Shield =

২০২০ আইএফএ শিল্ড

Tournament details
- Country: India
- Dates: 6–19 December
- Teams: 12

Final positions
- Champions: Real Kashmir (1st title)
- Runners-up: George Telegraph

Tournament statistics
- Matches played: 22
- Goals scored: 54 (2.45 per match)
- Top goal scorer: Lukman Adefemi (5 goals)

The 2020 IFA Shield is the 123rd edition of the IFA Shield. It will have four I-League teams and eight Calcutta Premier Division teams. No overseas teams were invited due to the ongoing COVID-19 pandemic. Real Kashmir beat George Telegraph in the final to win their first IFA Shield title.

== Teams ==
Group	Team	Location
A	Kalighat MS	Kolkata, West Bengal
A	Kidderpore	Kolkata, West Bengal
A	Mohammedan	Kolkata, West Bengal
B	Aryan	Kolkata, West Bengal
B	Peerless	Kolkata, West Bengal
B	Real Kashmir	Srinagar, Jammu and Kashmir
C	George Telegraph	Kolkata, West Bengal
C	Indian Arrows	Mumbai, Maharashtra
C	Southern Samity	Kolkata, West Bengal
D	BSS	Kolkata, West Bengal
D	Gokulam Kerala	Calicut, Kerala
D	United	Kolkata, West Bengal

== Venue ==
All the matches were held at Salt Lake Stadium, East Bengal Ground, Mohun Bagan Ground, Sailen Manna Stadium, Rabindra Sarobar Stadium and Kalyani Stadium.

== Group stage ==
=== Group A ===
Pos	Team	Pld	W	D	L	GF	GA	GD	Pts	
1	Mohammedan	2	2	0	0	5	0	+5	6	Advance to the quarterfinals
2	Kalighat MS	2	1	0	1	4	2	+2	3	Advance to the quarterfinals
3	Kidderpore	2	0	0	2	1	8	−7	0	

Source: ifawb.org

6 December 2020
13:30 IST

Mohammedan	4–0	Kidderpore
Nigam 1', 86'; Mondal 28'; Adjah 46'	Report

Salt Lake Stadium, Kolkata
9 December 2020
13:30 IST

Kalighat MS	4–1	Kidderpore
Paswan 12'; Supriyo Ghosh 51'; Tuhin Sikdar 74'; Gourab Mondol 90'	Report	Saikat Sikdar 27'

Rabindra Sarobar Stadium, Kolkata
12 December 2020
13:30 IST

Mohammedan	1–0	Kalighat MS
Firoz Ali 50'	Report

Kalyani Stadium, Kalyani

=== Group B ===
Pos	Team	Pld	W	D	L	GF	GA	GD	Pts	
1	Real Kashmir	2	2	0	0	5	1	+4	6	Advance to the quarterfinals
2	Peerless	2	0	1	1	2	3	−1	1	Advance to the quarterfinals
3	Aryan	2	0	1	1	1	4	−3	1	

Source: ifawb.org

6 December 2020
13:30 IST

Real Kashmir	2–1	Peerless
Lyngdoh 25'; Danish Farooq 32'	Report	Rai 20'

East Bengal Ground, Kolkata
9 December 2020
13:30 IST

Real Kashmir	3–0	Aryan
Robertson 72'; Danish Farooq 84'; Adefemi 90+4'	Report

Kalyani Stadium, Kalyani
12 December 2020
13:30 IST

Aryan	1–1	Peerless
Sumit Ghosh 90+5'	Report	Rai 90+2'

Mohun Bagan Ground, Kolkata

=== Group C ===
Pos	Team	Pld	W	D	L	GF	GA	GD	Pts	
1	George Telegraph	2	2	0	0	4	1	+3	6	Advance to the quarterfinals
2	Southern Samity	2	0	1	1	2	3	−1	1	Advance to the quarterfinals
3	Indian Arrows	2	0	1	1	1	3	−2	1	

Source: ifawb.org

6 December 2020
13:30 IST

Indian Arrows	1–1	Southern Samity
Gurkirat 79'	Report	Sujit Saren 28'

Mohun Bagan Ground, Kolkata
9 December 2020
13:30 IST

Indian Arrows	0–2	George Telegraph
	Report	Stanley Eze 13'; Goutam Das 80'

Sailen Manna Stadium, Howrah
12 December 2020
13:30 IST

George Telegraph	2–1	Southern Samity
Krishanu Naskar 60'; Tanmoy Ghosh 63'	Report	Yao Rudy Abbidde 83'

East Bengal Ground, Kolkata

=== Group D ===
Pos	Team	Pld	W	D	L	GF	GA	GD	Pts	
1	United	2	2	0	0	3	1	+2	6	Advance to the quarterfinals
2	Gokulam Kerala	2	1	0	1	7	3	+4	3	Advance to the quarterfinals
3	BSS	2	0	0	2	3	9	−6	0	

Source: ifawb.org

6 December 2020
13:30 IST

Gokulam Kerala	0–1	United
	Report	Middleton 90+1'

Kalyani Stadium, Kalyani
9 December 2020
13:30 IST

BSS	1–2	United
Ashique Ali 49'	Report	Sourav Das 20'; Jagannath Oraw 31' (pen.)

Mohun Bagan Ground, Kolkata
12 December 2020
13:30 IST

Gokulam Kerala	7–2	BSS
Antwi 8' (pen.), 11', 21', 47'; Shibil 70'; Jithin 75'; Saliou 83'	Report	Pritam Roy 67'; Asif Ali Molla 74'

Sailen Manna Stadium, Howrah

== Knockout stage ==
=== Bracket ===
Quarterfinals
Mohammedan	1
Gokulam Kerala	0
Real Kashmir	1
Southern Samity	0
George Telegraph	1
Peerless	0
United (p)	0 (4)
Kalighat MS	0 (3)

Semifinals
Mohammedan	0
Real Kashmir	4
George Telegraph	2
United	1

Finals
Real Kashmir	2
George Telegraph	1

=== Quarter-finals ===
14 December 2020
13:00 IST

Mohammedan	1–0	Gokulam Kerala
Sarkar 7' (pen.)	Report

Kalyani Stadium, Kalyani
14 December 2020
13:00 IST

Real Kashmir	1–0	Southern Samity
Danish Farooq 22'	Report

East Bengal Ground, Kolkata
14 December 2020
13:00 IST

George Telegraph	1–0	Peerless
Tanmoy Ghosh 46'	Report

Mohun Bagan Ground, Kolkata
14 December 2020
13:00 IST

United	0–0 (a.e.t.)	Kalighat MS
	Report
Penalties
	4–3

Sailen Manna Stadium, Howrah

=== Semi-finals ===
16 December 2020
13:00 IST

Mohammedan	0–4	Real Kashmir
	Report	Adefemi 59', 66', 88'; Robertson 90+3'

Salt Lake Stadium, Kolkata
16 December 2020
13:00 IST

George Telegraph	2–1	United
Saddam Hossain 78'; Stanley Eze 82'	Report	Basudeb Mondal 36'

Kalyani Stadium, Kalyani

=== Final ===
19 December 2020
13:00 IST

George Telegraph	1–2	Real Kashmir
Goutam Das 48'	Report	Adefemi 36' (pen.); Robertson 59'

Salt Lake Stadium, Kolkata
Referee: Pranjal Banerjee

== Statistics ==
=== Top goal scorers ===
Rank	Nat.	Player	Club	Goals
1	(Nigeria)	Lukman Adefemi	Real Kashmir	5
2	(Ghana)	Denny Antwi	Gokulam Kerala	4
3	(India)	Danish Farooq	Real Kashmir	3
3	(Scotland)	Mason Robertson	Real Kashmir	3
5	(India)	Gani Nigam	Mohammedan	2
5	(India)	Uttam Rai	Peerless	2
5	(India)	Tanmoy Ghosh	George Telegraph	2
5	(Nigeria)	Stanley Eze	George Telegraph	2
5	(India)	Goutam Das	George Telegraph	2
