= Lukman Adefemi =

Nigerian footballer (born 1994)

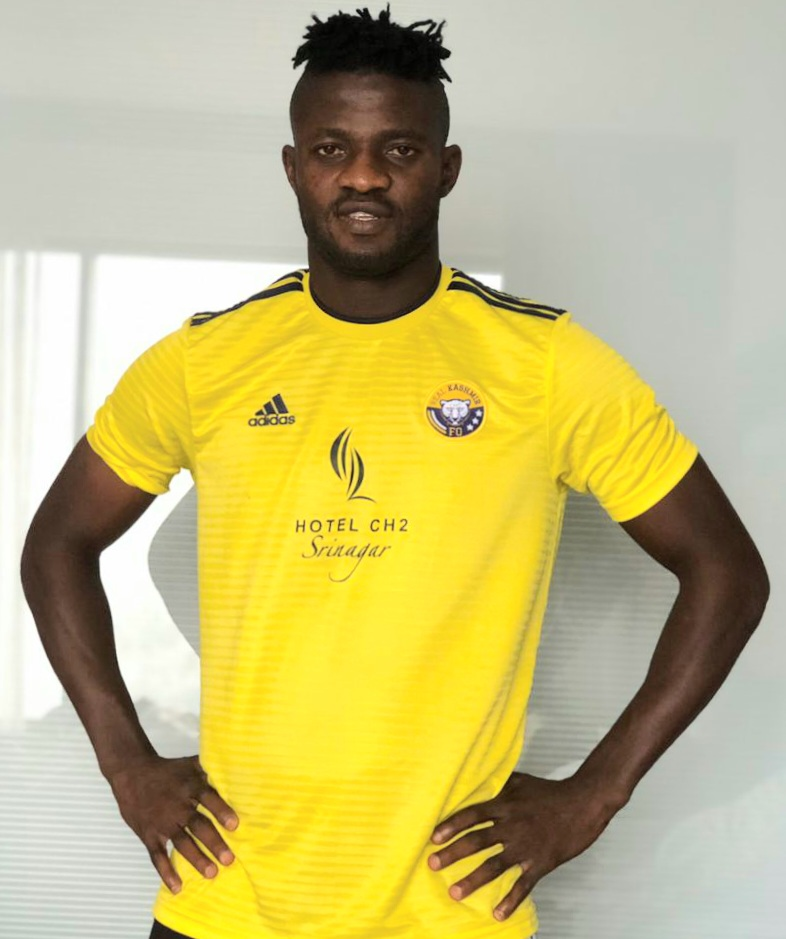
- Adefemi with Real Kashmir in 2021

Personal information
- Full name: Lukman Adefemi Abegunrin
- Date of birth: 13 March 1994 (age 32)
- Place of birth: Lagos, Nigeria
- Height: 6 ft 2 in (1.88 m)
- Position: Forward

Team information
- Current team: Dempo SC
- Number: 7

Youth career
- 2009–2011: Wusu Football Academy

Senior career*
Years	Team	Apps	(Gls)
2011–2013	Crown FC	25	(14)
2013–2014	FK Javor Ivanjica	9	(3)
2015–2016	CD Maxaquene	40	(25)
2017	FC Chibuto	10	(7)
2017–2018	→ Varzim SC (loan)	8	(2)
2018	Ferroviário	14	(6)
2018–2019	Nampula	16	(8)
2019	Al-Rustaq	28	(17)
2020	Bidiyah SC	10	(4)
2021	Real Kashmir	18	(11)
2021–2022	Free State Stars	15	(7)
2022–2023	AFC Uttara		
2023	Rivers United F.C.	13	(4)
2023–2024	Mesarya SK	33	(11)
2024–2025	Dempo SC	11	(5)
2025	Abu Muslim SC	5	(2)
2025-2026	Hutteen SC	10	
- * Club domestic league appearances and goals

Lukman Adefemi Abegunrin is a Nigerian professional footballer who p

lays as a forward for Hutteen SC in Syrian Premier League.

== Career ==
=== Nigeria ===
Born in Lagos, Nigeria. Lukman emerged through the youth ranks of local academy called Wusu. In 2012, Nigeria Premier league side Crown FC signed Lukman for a season and he made his professional debut at the age of 18 years. He was adjudged best youth player for Crown FC.

=== Serbia ===
FK Javor Ivanjica scouted talent of Lukman and offered him 1 year deal. In 2013-14 Javor Ivanjica relegated to Serbia first league. In 2014, Lukman came back to Africa.

=== Mozambique ===
In 2015, Lukman joined Moçambola giants CD Maxaquene. Lukman finished the season on a high note and become top scorer for Maxaquene. In 2016, Lukman finished runner-up with Maxaquene in Taça de Moçambique. In 2017, Lukman joined FC Chibuto and had another successful season there. He was then getting offers from European clubs and one of them was Varzim.

=== Portugal ===
After his impressive season in Mozambique, Portugal club Varzim signed him on loan where Lukman played for half season and came back to Mozambique and joined Ferroviário.

=== Oman ===
In 2019, Lukman joined Oman Professional League club Al-Rustaq for half season of 2018-19. In January 2020, Lukman joined another Oman based club Al Diriyah for remainder season of 2019-20.

=== India ===
In December 2019, Lukman joined I-League club Real Kashmir FC. In the same month, Real Kashmir won prestigious IFA Shield. He was adjudged man of the tournament and top scorer of IFA Shield 2019-20. On 10 January 2021, Lukman made his debut for Real Kashmir in I-League against Manipur based club TRAU FC, which ended as 1-1 draw.

=== South Africa ===
On 1 October 2021, Lukman signed with second tier of South African football club, Free State Stars.

== Honours ==
Real Kashmir

- IFA Shield: 2020

CD Maxaquene

- Taça de Moçambique: 2016

Individual

- IFA Shield Top Scorer/MVP: 2020
