= Vineeth Kumar Velmurugan =

Indian association football player

Vineeth Velmurugan
Personal information
- Full name: Vineeth Kumar Velmurugan
- Date of birth: 31 December 2000 (age 25)
- Place of birth: Chennai, Tamil Nadu, India
- Height: 1.74 m (5 ft 8 1/2 in)
- Position: Winger

Team information
- Current team: Sreenidi Deccan
- Number: 16

Youth career
- Chennai City

Senior career*
Years	Team	Apps	(Gls)
2019–2021	Chennai City	10	(3)
2021–	Sreenidi Deccan	9	(1)
- * Club domestic league appearances and goals as of 22:21, 2 May 2022 (UTC)

Vineeth Kumar Velmurugan (born 31 December 2000), is an Indian professional footballer who plays as a winger for I-League club Sreenidi Deccan.

== Club career ==
=== Chennai City ===
Born in Chennai, Tamil Nadu, Velmurugan represented his state's youth team before joining the youth side at Chennai City. After performing well for the under-18 side, Kumar was promoted to the first-team for the Durand Cup where he made two appearances.

Velmurugan made his professional debut for Chennai City in the I-League against Sudeva Delhi on 3 February 2021. He came on as an 83rd-minute substitute for the club in their 4–0 defeat. The next game, he scored his first professional goal against NEROCA. His 6th-minute goal was the first in a 2–1 victory. Kumar then scored a brace for Chennai City on 11 March 2021 against Indian Arrows. The two goals were part of a 5–0 victory.

=== Sreenidi Deccan ===
On 15 September 2021, Velmurugan signed for Sreenidi Deccan.

On 27 December 2021, he made his debut for the club against NEROCA, in a 3–2 loss, coming on as an 84th-minute substitute for Lalchungnunga. On 28 March 2022, he scored his first goal for the club, against Churchill Brothers, in a 1–1 stalemate.

== Career statistics ==
=== Club ===
As of 2 May 2022

Club	Season	League			Cup		AFC		Total	
Club	Season	Division	Apps	Goals	Apps	Goals	Apps	Goals	Apps	Goals
Chennai City	2019–18	I-League	0	0	2 (Note: Appearances in the Durand Cup)	0	—		2	0
Chennai City	2020–21	I-League	10	3	0	0	—		10	3
Sreenidi Deccan	2021–22	I-League	9	1	0	0	—		9	1
Career total			19	4	2	0	0	0	21	4
