= Ashok Singh Moirangmayum =

Indian footballer

Ashok Singh
Personal information
- Full name: Ashok Singh Moirangmayum
- Date of birth: 7 April 1993 (age 33)
- Place of birth: Manipur, India
- Height: 1.68 m (5 ft 6 in)
- Position: Defender

Team information
- Current team: Gokulam Kerala
- Number: 3

Senior career*
Years	Team	Apps	(Gls)
2016–2019	NEROCA	41	(1)
2019–	Gokulam Kerala	0	(0)
- * Club domestic league appearances and goals

Ashok Singh Moirangmayum (Meitei: Moirangmayum Ashok Singh, born 7 April 1993) is an Indian professional footballer who plays as a defender from Manipur who currently plays for Gokulam Kerala F.C. in the I-League.

== Career ==
=== Gokulam Kerala fc ===
On 5 July 2019, it was announced that Ashok Singh signed for Gokulam Kerala in the I-League

== Career statistics ==
As of 7 September 2019

Club	Season	League			League Cup		Domestic Cup		Continental		Total	
Club	Season	Division	Apps	Goals	Apps	Goals	Apps	Goals	Apps	Goals	Apps	Goal
NEROCA	2016-17	I-League 2nd Division	15	1	—	—	0	0	0	0	15	1
NEROCA	2017–18	I-League	10	0	2	0	0	0	0	0	12	0
NEROCA	2018–19	I-League	16	0	—	—	0	0	0	0	16	0
NEROCA	Total		41	1	2	0	0	0	0	0	43	01
Gokulam Kerala	2019–20	I-League	0	0	—	—	1	0	0	0	1	0
Gokulam Kerala	Total		0	0	0	0	1	0	0	0	1	0
Career total			41	1	0	0	1	0	0	0	44	1

== Honours ==
Gokulam Kerala

- Durand Cup: 2019
