= Mayakkannan Muthu =

Indian footballer

Personal information
- Full name: Mayakkannan Muthu Irulandi
- Date of birth: 4 June 1997 (age 29)
- Place of birth: Ramanathapuram, Tamil Nadu, India
- Height: 1.70 m (5 ft 7 in)
- Position: Defensive midfielder

Team information
- Current team: NorthEast United

Senior career*
Years	Team	Apps	(Gls)
2019–2021	Gokulam Kerala	23	(0)
2021–2024	Sreenidi Deccan	57	(0)
2024–	NorthEast United	1	(0)
- * Club domestic league appearances and goals as of 17:06, 13 April 2024 (UTC)

Mayakkannan Muthu Irulandi (born 4 June 1997) is an Indian footballer who plays as a defensive midfielder for NorthEast United in the Indian Super League.

== Career ==
=== Gokulam Kerala ===
On 6 August 2019, Mayakannan was promoted from the Gokulam Kerala Reserves to senior team for their Durand Cup squad by head coach Fernando Varela. On 18 August 2019, he made his debut for the club in the competition, against TRAU, in a 4–1 win.

On 6 December 2019, he made his I-League debut for the club against Indian Arrows, in a narrow 1–0 win, coming on for Haroon Amiri in the 72nd minute.

=== Sreenidi Deccan ===
On 30 June 2021, Mayakkannan joined Sreenidi Deccan, reuniting with his former head coach Fernando Varela.

On 27 December 2021, he made his debut for the club against NEROCA, in a 3–2 loss.

== Career statistics ==
=== Club ===
As of 13 April 2024

Club	Season	League			Cup		AFC		Total	
Club	Season	Division	Apps	Goals	Apps	Goals	Apps	Goals	Apps	Goals
Gokulam Kerala	2019–20	I-League	9	0	2 (Note: Appearance(s) in Durand Cup)	0	—		11	0
Gokulam Kerala	2020–21	I-League	14	0	3 (Note: Appearance(s) in IFA Shield)	0	—		17	0
Gokulam Kerala	Total		23	0	5	0	0	0	28	0
Sreenidi Deccan	2021–22	I-League	18	0	0	0	—		18	0
Sreenidi Deccan	2022–23	I-League	18	0	4 (Note: Appearance(s) in Super Cup)	0	—		22	0
Sreenidi Deccan	2023–24	I-League	21	0	1	0	—		22	0
Sreenidi Deccan	Total		57	0	5	0	0	0	62	0
NorthEast United	2024–25	Indian Super League	0	0	0	0	—		0	0
Career total			80	0	10	0	0	0	90	0

== Honours ==
Gokulam Kerala

- Durand Cup: 2019
- Kerala Premier League: 2018
- I-League: 2020–21

NorthEast United

- Durand Cup: 2024, 2025
