= Ubaid Chono Kadavath =

Indian footballer (born 1990)

Personal information
- Full name: Ubaid Chono Kadavath
- Date of birth: 5 February 1990 (age 36)
- Place of birth: Kuthuparamba, Kannur, Kerala, India
- Height: 1.85 m (6 ft 1 in)
- Position: Goalkeeper

Team information
- Current team: Kannur Warriors

Senior career*
Years	Team	Apps	(Gls)
2011−2012	Viva Kerala		
2012−2013	Dempo		
2013−2014	Air India		
2014−2015	ONGC		
2015−2016	Air India		
2016−2017	ONGC		
2017	→ FC Kerala (loan)		
2017−2019	East Bengal	9	(0)
2019–2021	Gokulam Kerala	27	(0)
2021–2025	Sreenidi Deccan	28	(0)
2025–	Kannur Warriors		
- * Club domestic league appearances and goals as of 18:36, 5 April 2025 (UTC)

Ubaid Chono Kadavath (born 5 February 1990) is an Indian professional footballer who plays as a goalkeeper for the Super League Kerala club Kannur Warriors.

== Career ==
Ubaid was part of Maharashtra Santhosh Trophy squad for the year 2015. He represented the state of Maharashtra in the National Games that followed too.

During COVID-19 pandemic, he auctioned his first-ever I-League-winning goalkeeping jersey to donate the sum to Kerala Chief Minister's Distress Relief Fund.

=== ONGC ===
During his tenure at ONGC FC, Ubaid was declared as the Best Goalkeeper for the season 2016–17 in the First Ever MDFA Awards.

=== East Bengal ===
After his solid performance for FC Kerala in the Kerala Premier League and Gadhinglaj All India Football Tournament, Ubaid moved to Kolkata side East Bengal in a loan for the 2nd half of 2017–18 I-League.

On 25 April 2018, it is announced that Ubaid has signed a renewal contract with East Bengal which keeps the shot stopper at the club till 2020.

== Career statistics ==
As of 5 December 2024

Club	Season	League			Domestic Cup		Continental		Other		Total	
Club	Season	Division	Apps	Goals	Apps	Goals	Apps	Goals	Apps	Goals	Apps	Goals
East Bengal (On Loan from FC Kerala)	2017–18	I-League	7	0	4 (Note: Appearance(s) in Super Cup)	0	—		—		11	0
East Bengal (On Loan from FC Kerala)	2018–19	I-League	2	0	—		—		—		2	0
East Bengal (On Loan from FC Kerala)	East Bengal Total		9	0	4	0	—		—		13	0
Gokulam Kerala	2018–19	I-League	0	0	4 (Note: Appearances in Durand Cup)	0	—		—		4	0
Gokulam Kerala	2019–20	I-League	13	0	—		—		—		13	0
Gokulam Kerala	2020–21	I-League	14	0	3 (Note: Appearances in IFA Shield)	0	—		—		17	0
Gokulam Kerala	Gokulam Kerala Total		27	0	7	0	—		—		34	0
Sreenidi Deccan FC	2021–22	I-League	1	0	—		—		—		1	0
Sreenidi Deccan FC	2022–23	I-League	12	0	—		—		—		12	0
Sreenidi Deccan FC	2023-24	I-League	5	0	1	0	—		—		6	0
Sreenidi Deccan FC	Sreenidi Deccan Total		18	0	1	0	—		—		19	0
Career total			54	0	12	0	0	0	0	0	66	0

== Honours ==
=== Club ===
Gokulam Kerala FC

- Durand Cup

(gold) : Champions (1): 2019

- I-League

(gold) Champions (1): 2020–21

Sreenidi Deccan FC

- I-League

(silver) Runners-up (2): 2022-23, 2023-24
(bronze) Third-place (1): 2021-22
