= Shibil Muhammed =

Indian footballer

Personal information
- Full name: Shibil Muhammed
- Date of birth: 23 January 1998 (age 28)
- Place of birth: Karuvarakundu, Kerala, India
- Height: 1.75 m (5 ft 9 in)
- Position: Midfielder

Team information
- Current team: Sreenidi Deccan
- Number: 23

Senior career*
Years	Team	Apps	(Gls)
2019–2021	Gokulam Kerala	12	(3)
2021–2022	Sreenidi Deccan	2	(0)
2022–	Bengaluru United	0	(0)
- * Club domestic league appearances and goals

Shibil Muhammed (born on 23 January 1998) is an Indian footballer from Malappuram, Kerala, who currently plays for Bengaluru United.

== Career ==
=== Gokulam Kerala FC ===
In August 2019, Muhammed was promoted from reserve to Gokulam Kerala FC for their Durand Cup squad by coach Santiago Valera. He made his senior debut in durand cup and scored one goal against Air Force . Shibil made his I league debut in a 2–3 loss against Chennai City as a substitute. Muhammed scored 2 goals in that match.

== Career statistics ==
As of 8 February 2020

Club	Season	League			League Cup		Domestic Cup		Continental		Total	
Club	Season	Division	Apps	Goals	Apps	Goals	Apps	Goals	Apps	Goals	Apps	Goal
Gokulam Kerala	2019–20	I-League	10	3	—	—	4 (Note: Appearances in Durand Cup)	1	4 (Note: Appearances in Sheikh Kamal International Club Cup)	0	18	4
Gokulam Kerala	2020–21	I-League	2	0	—	—	3 (Note: Appearances in IFA Shield)	1	0	0	5	1
Gokulam Kerala	Total		12	3	0	0	7	2	4	0	23	5
Career total			12	3	0	0	7	2	4	0	23	5

== Honours ==
=== Club ===
Gokulam Kerala FC

- Durand Cup: 2019
- I-League

(gold) Champions (1): 2020–21
