= List of 2019–20 Indian Super League season roster changes =

Roster changes occurring before 2019-2020 ISL season

2019–20 Indian Suìper League roster changes
- Season: 2019–20 Indian Super League season

This is a list of all roster changes that occurred prior to the 2019–20 Indian Super League season.

== Player movement and other transactions ==
=== Team changes ===
Date	Name	Previous club	ISL club	Transfer Type
31 March 2019	(India) Sinivasan Pandiyan	(India) Chennai City	(India) Chennaiyin	Loan return
31 May 2019	(India) Boris Singh	(India) Indian Arrows	(India) ATK	Loan Return
31 May 2019	(India) Abhijit Sarkar	(India) Indian Arrows	(India) Chennaiyin	Loan Return
31 May 2019	(India) Deepak Tangri	(India) Indian Arrows	(India) Chennaiyin	Loan Return
31 May 2019	(India) Rahim Ali	(India) Indian Arrows	(India) Chennaiyin	Loan Return
31 May 2019	(India) Aniket Jadhav	(India) Indian Arrows	(India) Jamshedpur	Loan Return
31 May 2019	(India) Rahim Ali	(India) Indian Arrows	(India) Chennaiyin	Loan Return
31 May 2019	(India) Amarjit Singh Kiyam	(India) Indian Arrows	(India) Jamshedpur	Loan Return
31 May 2019	(India) Bilal Khan	(India) Real Kashmir	(India) Kerala Blasters	Free
31 May 2019	(India) Anwar Ali	(India) Indian Arrows	(India) Mumbai City	Loan Return
31 May 2019	(India) Wayne Vaz	(India) Churchill Brothers	(India) Pune City	Loan Return
31 May 2019	(India) Malsawmzuala	(India) Jamshedpur	(India) ATK	Loan Return
31 May 2019	(India) Sheikh Faiaz	(India) Mohun Bagan	(India) ATK	Loan Return
31 May 2019	(India) Imran Khan	(India) Mohun Bagan	(India) ATK	Loan Return
31 May 2019	(India) Siam Hanghal	(India) East Bengal	(India) Odisha	Loan Return
31 May 2019	(India) Sandeep Singh	(India) TRAU	(India) ATK	Loan Return
31 May 2019	(India) Amit Tudu	(India) South United	(India) Odisha	Loan Return
31 May 2019	(India) Lalthuammawia Ralte	(India) Kerala Blasters	(India) Goa	Loan Return
31 May 2019	(India) Naveen Kumar	(India) Goa	(India) Kerala Blasters	Loan Return
31 May 2019	(India) Bikramjit Singh	(India) Mohun Bagan	(India) Mumbai City	Loan Return
31 May 2019	(India) H. Lalmuankima	(India) Gokulam Kerala	(India) ATK	Loan Return
31 May 2019	(India) Sanjay Balmuchu	(India) Mumbai City	(India) Jamshedpur	Loan Return
31 May 2019	(Bhutan) Chencho Gyeltshen	(India) NEROCA	(India) Bengaluru	Loan Return
31 May 2019	(India) Bedashwor Singh	(India) Fateh Hyderabad	(India) Chennaiyin	Loan Return
31 May 2019	(India) Kivi Zhimomi	(India) TRAU	(India) NorthEast United	Loan Return
31 May 2019	(India) Gaurav Bora	(India) Chennai City	(India) Odisha	Loan Return
4 June 2019	(India) Salam Ranjan Singh	(India) East Bengal	(India) ATK	Free
9 June 2019	(India) Jobby Justin	(India) East Bengal	(India) ATK	Free
9 June 2019	(India) Joyner Lourenco	(India) Mumbai City	(India) Jamshedpur	Free
9 June 2019	(India) Keegan Pereira	(India) Northeast United	(India) Jamshedpur	Free
9 June 2019	(India) Niraj Kumar	(India) Ozone FC	(India) Jamshedpur	Free
9 June 2019	(India) Rowllin Borges	(India) Northeast United	(India) Mumbai City	Free
9 June 2019	(India) Lovepreet Singh	(India) Indian Arrows	(India) Kerala Blasters	Free
9 June 2019	(India) Jerry Mawihmingthanga	(India) Jamshedpur	(India) Odisha	Undisclosed
9 June 2019	(India) Sourav Das	(India) Mohun Bagan	(India) Mumbai City	Free
9 June 2019	(India) Michael Soosairaj	(India) Jamshedpur	(India) ATK	116 Th. €
9 June 2019	(India) Zayed Bin Waleed	N/A	(India) Kerala Blasters	Free
9 June 2019	(India) Prabhsukhan Singh Gill	(India) Indian Arrows	(India) Bengaluru	Free
9 June 2019	(India) Suresh Singh Wangjam	(India) Indian Arrows	(India) Bengaluru	Free
9 June 2019	(India) Edwin Sydney Vanspaul	(India) Chennai City	(India) Chennaiyin	Free
9 June 2019	(India) Seiminlen Doungel	(India) Kerala Blasters	(India) Goa	Free
9 June 2019	(Republic of Ireland) Carl McHugh	(Scotland) Motherwell	(India) ATK	Free
9 June 2019	(India) Lalengmawia	(India) Indian Arrows	(India) NorthEast United	Free
9 June 2019	(Nigeria) Bartholomew Ogbeche	(India) NorthEast United	(India) Kerala Blasters	Free
9 June 2019	(India) Michael Regin	(India) Chennai City	(India) ATK	Undisclosed
9 June 2019	(Spain) Piti	(Greece) PAS Lamia	(India) Jamshedpur	Free
9 June 2019	(Spain) Noé Acosta	(Greece) AE Larissa	(India) Jamshedpur	Free
9 June 2019	(India) Wayne Vaz	(India) Pune City	(India) NorthEast United	Undisclosed
10 June 2019	(India) Hmingthanmawia	(India) Aizawl	(India) Mumbai City	Undisclosed
11 June 2019	(Senegal) Diawandou Diagne	(Belgium) Eupen	(India) Odisha	Free
12 June 2019	(Spain) Mario Arqués	(India) Jamshedpur	(India) Kerala Blasters	Free
12 June 2019	(India) Surchandra Singh	(India) Real Kashmir	(India) Mumbai City	Free
12 June 2019	(Spain) Sergio Cidoncha	(India) Jamshedpur	(India) Kerala Blasters	Free
17 June 2019	(Croatia) Mato Grgić	(India) NorthEast United	(India) Mumbai City	Undisclosed
17 June 2019	(India) Eugeneson Lyngdoh	(India) ATK	(India) Bengaluru	Free
18 June 2019	(Fiji) Roy Krishna	(New Zealand) Wellington Phoenix	(India) ATK	Undisclosed
19 June 2019	(India) Sarthak Golui	(India) Pune City	(India) Mumbai City	Free
19 June 2019	(Brazil) Diego Carlos	(India) Pune City	(India) Mumbai City	Undisclosed
20 June 2019	(India) Rahul Kannoly Praveen	(India) Indian Arrows	(India) Kerala Blasters	Free
25 June 2019	(Spain) Xisco	(India) Bengaluru	(India) Odisha	Free
26 June 2019	(Netherlands) Gianni Zuiverloon	(India) Odisha	(India) Kerala Blasters	Free
27 June 2019	(India) Gaurav Bora	(India) Pune City	(India) Odisha	Free
28 June 2019	(Australia) David Williams	(New Zealand) Wellington Phoenix	(India) ATK	Free
3 July 2019	(India) Jitendra Singh	(India) Indian Arrows	(India) Jamshedpur	Free
3 July 2019	(India) Narender Gahlot	(India) Indian Arrows	(India) Jamshedpur	Free
3 July 2019	(India) Shibinraj Kunniyil	(India) Gokulam Kerala	(India) Kerala Blasters	Free
5 July 2019	(India) Issac Vanmalsawma	(India) Chennaiyin	(India) Jamshedpur	Free
5 July 2019	(India) Anas Edathodika	(India) Kerala Blasters	(India) ATK	Free
6 July 2019	(Lithuania) Nerijus Valskis	(Israel) Hapoel Tel Aviv	(India) Chennaiyin	Free
10 July 2019	(India) Bilal Khan	(India) Real Kashmir	(India) Kerala Blasters	Free
10 July 2019	(Spain) Carlos Delgado	(Spain) Castellón	(India) Odisha	Loan
10 July 2019	(India) Alexander Romario Jesuraj	(India) Chennai City	(India) Goa	Undisclosed
17 July 2019	(Senegal) Moustapha Gning	(Spain) Ejea	(India) Kerala Blasters	Free
17 July 2019	(India) Ankit Bhuyan	(India) Delhi Dynamos U18	(India) Odisha	-
17 July 2019	(Spain) Manuel Onwu	(Spain) UCAM Murcia	(India) Bengaluru	Free
19 July 2019	(India) Arshdeep Singh	(India) Minerva Punjab	(India) Odisha	Free
19 July 2019	(Spain) Aitor Monroy	(Spain) Inter de Madrid	(India) Jamshedpur	Free
19 July 2019	(Spain) Javi Hernández	(Poland) Cracovia	(India) ATK	Undisclosed
23 July 2019	(Australia) Dario Vidošić	(Australia) Melbourne City	(India) ATK	Free
24 July 2019	(Spain) Aridane	(Spain) Cultural Leonesa	(India) Odisha	Loan
24 July 2019	(India) Rehenesh TP	(India) NorthEast United	(India) Kerala Blasters	Free
26 July 2019	(Spain) Agus	(Cyprus) Nea Salamis	(India) ATK	Free
26 July 2019	(India) Aibanbha Dohling	(India) Shillong Lajong	(India) Goa	Free
27 July 2019	(India) Manvir Singh	(India) Ozone	(India) Kerala Blasters	Free
31 July 2019	(India) Arjun Jayaraj	(India) Gokulam Kerala	(India) Kerala Blasters	Free
2 August 2019	(India) Nim Dorjee Tamang	(India) Pune City	(India) NorthEast United	Free
4 August 2019	(India) Ranjan Singh	(India) East Bengal	(India) ATK	Free
7 August 2019	(India) Darren Caldeira	(India) Mohun Bagan	(India) Kerala Blasters	Free
8 August 2019	(India) Soram Anganba	(India) Bengaluru	(India) NorthEast	Free
8 August 2019	(India) Subhasish Roy Chowdhury	(India) Jamshedpur	(India) NorthEast	Free
9 August 2019	(Tunisia) Amine Chermiti	(Saudi Arabia) Al-Fayha	(India) Mumbai City	Free
9 August 2019	(Uruguay) Federico Gallego	(Uruguay) Boston River	(India) NorthEast	Undisclosed
13 August 2019	(Romania) Lucian Goian	(India) Mumbai City	(India) Chennaiyin	Free
13 August 2019	(Spain) Sergio Castel	(Spain) Atlético Madrid B	(India) Jamshedpur	Loan
13 August 2019	(India) Milan Singh	(India) Mumbai City	(India) NorthEast United	Free
14 August 2019	(India) Jessel Carneiro	(India) Dempo	(India) Kerala Blasters	Free
17 August 2019	(India) Seityasen Singh	(India) Dempo	(India) Kerala Blasters	Free
19 August 2019	(Afghanistan) Masih Saighani	(Bangladesh) Abahani Dhaka	(India) Chennaiyin	Free
21 August 2019	(Brazil) Jairo Rodrigues	(Indonesia) Persela Lamongan	(India) Kerala Blasters	Free
22 August 2019	(India) Pratik Chaudhari	(India) Jamshedpur	(India) Mumbai City	Free
22 August 2019	(Argentina) Maximiliano Barreiro	(Ecuador) Aucas	(India) NorthEast United	Free
23 August 2019	(India) Mohammed Rafi	(India) Chennaiyin	(India) Kerala Blasters	Free
24 August 2019	(Gabon) Sèrge Kevyn	(Libya) Al-Ittihad	(India) Mumbai City	Free
24 August 2019	(India) Dheeraj Singh	(India) Kerala Blasters	(India) ATK	Free
24 August 2019	(Romania) Dragoș Firțulescu	(Bulgaria) Dunav Ruse	(India) Chennaiyin	Free
24 August 2019	(India) Sehnaj Singh	(India) Mumbai City	(India) ATK	Free
24 August 2019	(Brazil) Raphael Augusto	(India) Chennaiyin	(India) Bengaluru	Free
24 August 2019	(Cameroon) Raphaël Messi Bouli	(Iran) Foolad	(India) Kerala Blasters	Free
26 August 2019	(India) C. K. Vineeth	(India) Chennaiyin	(India) Jamshedpur	Free
27 August 2019	(Malta) André Schembri	(Cyprus) Apollon Limassol	(India) Chennaiyin	Free
27 August 2019	(India) Ashique Kuruniyan	(India) Pune City	(India) Bengaluru	Undisclosed
29 August 2019	(Uruguay) Martín Cháves	(Uruguay) Juventud	(India) NorthEast United	Free
30 August 2019	(India) Lallianzuala Chhangte	(India) Odisha	(India) Chennaiyin	Free
31 August 2019	(India) Sandeep Singh	(India) TRAU	(India) ATK	Loan return
31 August 2019	(India) Vishal Kaith	(India) Pune City	(India) Chennaiyin	Free
1 September 2019	(India) Bidyananda Singh	(India) Bengaluru	(India) Mumbai City	Free
1 September 2019	(India) Laxmikant Kattimani	(India) Goa	(India) Hyderabad	Free
1 September 2019	(India) Nirmal Chettri	(India) Goa	N/A	Free
1 September 2019	(India) Deependra Negi	(India) Kerala Blasters	(India) Hyderabad	Free
1 September 2019	(India) Narayan Chettri	(India) Kerala Blasters B	(India) Kerala Blasters	–
1 September 2019	(India) Basit Ahmed Bhat	(India) Lonestar Kashmir	(India) Kerala Blasters	Free
1 September 2019	(India) Sahil Panwar	(India) Pune City	(India) Hyderabad	Free
1 September 2019	(India) Robin Singh	(India) Pune City	(India) Hyderabad	Free
1 September 2019	(Austria) Marko Stanković	(India) Pune City	(India) Hyderabad	Free
1 September 2019	(India) Keenan Almeida	(India) Pune City	(India) Hyderabad	Free
1 September 2019	(India) Sahil Tavora	(India) Pune City	(India) Hyderabad	Free
1 September 2019	(India) Ghani Nigam	(India) Gokulam Kerala	(India) Hyderabad	Free
1 September 2019	(Brazil) Marcelinho	(India) Pune City	(India) Hyderabad	Free
1 September 2019	(India) Abhash Thapa	(India) Real Kashmir	(India) Hyderabad	Free
1 September 2019	(India) Jakob Vanlalhlimpuia	(India) Pune City	(India) Hyderabad	Free
1 September 2019	(India) Shankar Sampingiraj	(India) Pune City	(India) Hyderabad	Free
1 September 2019	(India) Abhishek Halder	(India) Pune City	(India) Hyderabad	Free
1 September 2019	(India) Tarif Akhand	(India) Chennai City	(India) Hyderabad	Free
1 September 2019	(India) Kamaljit Singh	(India) Pune City	(India) Hyderabad	Free
1 September 2019	(India) Faheem Ali	N/A	(India) Hyderabad	Free
1 September 2019	(India) Anuj Kumar	(India) Pune City	(India) Hyderabad	Free
1 September 2019	(India) Gurtej Singh	(India) Pune City	(India) Hyderabad	Free
1 September 2019	(India) Adil Khan	(India) Pune City	(India) Hyderabad	Free
1 September 2019	(India) Rohit Kumar	(India) Pune City	(India) Hyderabad	Free
1 September 2019	(India) Mohammad Yasir	(India) Pune City	(India) Hyderabad	Free
1 September 2019	(India) Alwyn George	(India) Pune City	(India) Hyderabad	Free
1 September 2019	(India) Nikhil Poojari	(India) Pune City	(India) Hyderabad	Free
1 September 2019	(India) Ashish Rai	(India) Indian Arrows	(India) Hyderabad	Free
2 September 2019	(India) Samuel Lalmuanpuia	(India) Shillong Lajong	(India) Kerala Blasters	Free
3 September 2019	(Brazil) Rafael Crivellaro	(Portugal) Feirense	(India) Chennaiyin	Free
6 September 2019	(Tunisia) Mohamed Larbi	(Tunisia) Tunis	(India) Mumbai City	Free
7 September 2019	(India) Amey Ranawade	(India) Mohun Bagan	(India) Goa	Free
9 September 2019	(India) Laldanmawia Ralte	(India) East Bengal	(India) Hyderabad	Free
15 September 2019	(Netherlands) Kai Heerings	(Netherlands) Fortuna Sittard	(India) NorthEast United	Free
19 September 2019	(Ghana) Asamoah Gyan	(Turkey) Kayserispor	(India) NorthEast United	Free
21 September 2019	(India) Abneet Bharti	(Portugal) Sintrense	(India) Kerala Blasters	Free
23 September 2019	(England) Matt Kilgallon	(Scotland) Hamilton Academical	(India) Hyderabad	Free
23 September 2019	(Brazil) Bobô	(Turkey) Alanyaspor	(India) Hyderabad	Free
30 September 2019	(Jamaica) Giles Barnes	(United States) Colorado Rapids	(India) Hyderabad	Free
1 October 2019	(Spain) Rafa	(Spain) Rayo Majadahonda	(India) Hyderabad	Free
1 October 2019	(Spain) Néstor Gordillo	(India) Chennai City	(India) Hyderabad	Free
1 October 2019	(India) Lara Sharma	(India) ATK B	(India) ATK	-
1 October 2019	(India) Anil Chawan	(India) ATK B	(India) ATK	Free
1 October 2019	(India) Shubham Dhas	(India) Goa B	(India) Goa	-
1 October 2019	(India) Kingsley Fernandes	(India) Goa B	(India) Goa	-e
1 October 2019	(India) Lalawmpuia	(India) Goa B	(India) Goa	-
1 October 2019	(India) Amrit Gope	(India) Jamshedpur B	(India) Jamshedpur	-
1 October 2019	(India) Lalhrezuala Sailo	(India) Odisha FC U18	(India) Odisha	–
1 October 2019	(India) Chhangte Van Lal Remtluanga	(India) Odisha FC U18	(India) Odisha	–
1 October 2019	(India) Pragyan Sundar Gogoi	Kerala Blasters B	(India) Kerala Blasters	–
18 October 2019	(India) Raju Gaikwad	(India) Jamshedpur	(India) Kerala Blasters	Free
31 October 2019	(India) Prosenjit Chakraborty	(India) Mohammedan	(India) Chennaiyin	Loan return
31 October 2019	(India) Shaiborlang Kharpan	(India) Ozone FC	(India) Kerala Blasters	Loan return
1 November 2019	(India) Hendry Antonay	(India) Chennayin	(India) Indian Arrows	Loan
1 November 2019	(India) Shaiborlang Kharpan	(India) Kerala Blasters	N/A	–
6 November 2019	(India) Asif Khan	(India) Mumbai City FC U18	(India) Mumbai City	-
22 November 2019	(North Macedonia) Vlatko Drobarov	(North Macedonia) Belasica	(India) Kerala Blasters	-
16 December 2019	(Spain) Mandi	(New Zealand) Wellington Phoenix	(India) ATK	-
1 January 2020	(Spain) Víctor Mongil	(Georgia (country)) Dinamo Tbilisi	(India) ATK	Free
1 January 2020	(Jamaica) Deshorn Brown	(United States) Oklahoma City	(India) Bengaluru	Free
1 January 2020	(India) Arsh Anwer Shaikh	(India) ATK B	(India) ATK	Free
6 January 2020	(Spain) David Grande	(Spain) Unionistas	(India) Jamshedpur	Undisclosed
6 January 2020	(India) Gourav Mukhi	(India) Jamshedpur B	(India) Jamshedpur	-
6 January 2020	(India) Sandip Mandi	(India) Jamshedpur B	(India) Jamshedpur	-
7 January 2020	(India) Ajay Chhetri	(India) Bengaluru	(India) Hyderabad	loan
14 January 2020	(India) Liston Colaco	(India) Goa	(India) Hyderabad	Free
14 January 2020	(India) Kunzang Bhutia	(India) Churchill Brothers	(India) Hyderabad	Free
14 January 2020	(India) Dimple Bhagat	(India) N/A	(India) Hyderabad	Free
15 January 2020	(Republic of Ireland) Andy Keogh	(Saudi Arabia) Al-Qadsiah	(India) NorthEast United	Free
15 January 2020	(Slovenia) Matej Poplatnik	(Hungary) Kaposvár	(India) Kerala Blasters	End of Loan
22 January 2020	(Sweden) Simon Lundevall	N/A	(India) NorthEast United	Free
28 January 2020	(Spain) Nili	(Greece) Platanias	(India) Bengaluru	Free
28 January 2020	(Spain) Manuel Onwu	(India) Bengaluru	(India) Odisha	Loan
28 January 2020	(India) Souvik Chakrabarti	(India) Mumbai City	(India) Hyderabad	Loan
28 January 2020	(India) Hitesh Sharma	(India) ATK	(India) Hyderabad	Free
1 February 2020	(India) Keenan Almeida	(India) Hyderabad	(India) Mumbai City	Loan
1 February 2020	(India) Dipu Mirdha	N/A	(India) NorthEast United FC	Free
12 February 2020	(Jamaica) Kevaughn Frater	(United States) NM United	(India) Bengaluru	Free

=== Unannounced signings ===
The following players have appeared either in a match or on the bench for an Indian Super League club without being announced as signed.

Name	Previous club	ISL club	Notes

=== Released players ===
This list includes players who were released from their club and who have yet to sign with another Indian Super League club or who have left the league.

Date	Name	Released by	New club (Non-ISL)	Transfer Type
31 March 2019	(Palestine) Carlos Salom	(India) Chennaiyin	(Thailand) Bangkok United	Loan return
1 April 2019	(Australia) Tim Cahill	(India) Jamshedpur	Retired	Free
2 April 2019	(Brazil) Rafael Bastos	(India) Mumbai City	(Brazil) Juventude	Free
29 April 2019	(Slovenia) Rene Mihelič	(India) Odisha	(Indonesia) Persib Bandung	Free
1 June 2019	(England) Matt Mills	(India) Pune City	(England) Forest Green Rovers	Free
1 June 2019	(Netherlands) Gregory Nelson	(India) Chennaiyin	N/A	Free Agent
9 June 2019	(India) Dhanachandra Singh	(India) Jamshedpur	(India) Mohun Bagan	Free
9 June 2019	(India) Ashutosh Mehta	(India) Pune City	(India) Mohun Bagan	Undisclosed
9 June 2019	(India) Boithang Haokip	(India) Bengaluru	(India) East Bengal	Undisclosed
9 June 2019	(India) Debjit Majumder	(India) ATK	(India) Mohun Bagan A.C.	Loan
14 June 2019	(India) Lalthuammawia Ralte	(India) Goa	(India) East Bengal	Loan
19 June 2019	(India) Nongdamba Naorem	(India) Kerala Blasters	(India) Mohun Bagan	Loan
19 June 2019	(India) Sheikh Faiaz	(India) Kerala Blasters	(India) Mohun Bagan	Undisclosed
19 June 2019	(India) Imran Khan	(India) Goa	(India) Mohun Bagan	Loan
25 June 2019	(Brazil) Gerson Vieira	(India) ATK	(Tanzania) Simba	Free
1 July 2019	(Cameroon) Andre Bikey	(India) ATK	N/A	Free agent
1 July 2019	(Nigeria) Kalu Uche	(India) ATK	N/A	Free agent
1 July 2019	(Morocco) Zaid Krouch	(India) Goa	(Morocco) RS Berkane	Free
1 July 2019	(India) Robin Singh	(India) Pune City	(India) TRAU	Undisclosed
1 July 2019	(India) Asheer Akhtar	(India) Bengaluru FC	(India) East Bengal	Free
1 July 2019	(India) Asifullah Khan	(India) Jamshedpur	(India) Real Kashmir	Free
5 July 2019	(Mexico) Ulises Dávila	(India) ATK	(New Zealand) Wellington Phoenix FC	Free
5 July 2019	(India) Nikhil Bernard	(India) Chennaiyin	N/A	Free Agent
5 July 2019	(Australia) Chris Herd	(India) Chennaiyin	N/A	Free Agent
11 July 2019	(India) Alexander Romario Jesuraj	(India) Goa	(India) Mohun Bagan	Free
12 July 2019	(Spain) Jonathan Vila	(India) Pune City	(Spain) Coruxo	Free
16 July 2019	(Uruguay) Matías Mirabaje	(India) Mumbai City	(Uruguay) Racing Club	Free
16 July 2019	(Democratic Republic of the Congo) Arnold Issoko	(India) Mumbai City	(France) Caen	Free
16 July 2019	(Serbia) Marko Klisura	(India) Mumbai City	(North Macedonia) Rabotnicki Skopje	Free
19 July 2019	(India) Abhijit Sarkar	(India) Chennaiyin	(India) East Bengal	Loan
30 July 2019	(Slovenia) Matej Poplatnik	(India) Kerala Blasters	(Hungary) Kaposvár	Loan
30 July 2019	(Spain) Pablo Morgado	(India) Jamshedpur	(Spain) La Nucía	Free
31 July 2019	(Colombia) Janeiler Rivas	(India) NorthEast United	(Argentina) Gimnasia	Free
31 July 2019	(India) Robinson Singh	(India) Bengaluru	(India) TRAU	Free
31 July 2019	(India) Altamash Sayed	(India) Bengaluru	(India) Real Kashmir	Free
2 August 2019	(India) Sanju Pradhan	(India) Odisha	(India) Minerva Punjab	Free
2 August 2019	(Serbia) Nemanja Lakić-Pešić	(India) Kerala Blasters	(Serbia) Voždovac	Free
9 August 2019	(India) Sukhdev Patil	(India) Odisha	(India) Churchill Brothers	Free
13 August 2019	(Brazil) Maílson Alves	(India) Chennaiyin	N/A	Free agent
13 August 2019	(Spain) Manuel Lanzarote	(India) ATK	(Spain) Sabadell	Free
16 August 2019	(Venezuela) Miku	(India) Bengaluru	(Cyprus) Omonia Nicosia	Free
27 August 2019	(France) Cyril Kali	(India) Kerala Blasters	(Greece) Panserraikos	Free
27 August 2019	(Brazil) Éverton Santos	(India) ATK	(Brazil) Figueirense	Free
31 August 2019	(India) Francis Fernandes	(India) Chennaiyin	N/A	Free
1 September 2019	(India) Kivi Zhimomi	(India) NorthEast United	(India) Churchill Brothers	Loan
1 September 2019	(India) Loken Meitei	(India) Kerala Blasters	(India) TRAU	Free
4 September 2019	(India) Shayan Roy	(India) Odisha	(India) TRAU	Free
28 September 2019	(India) Siam Hanghal	(India) Odisha	(India) NEROCA	Free
28 September 2019	(India) Yumnam Raju	(India) Jamshedpur	(India) Punjab	Free
17 November 2019	(India) Jithin MS	(India) Kerala Blasters	(India) Gokulam Kerala	Undisclosed
22 November 2019	(Brazil) Jairo Rodrigues	(India) Kerala Blasters	(India) N/A	-
1 December 2019	(India) Manvir Singh	(India) Kerala Blasters	(India) Indian Arrows	Loan
16 December 2019	(Republic of Ireland) Carl McHugh	(India) ATK	N/A	–
17 December 2019	(Argentina) Maximiliano Barreiro	(India) NorthEast United	N/A	–
30 December 2019	(Greece) Panagiotis Triadis	(India) NorthEast United	N/A	-
1 January 2020	(Spain) Agus	(India) ATK	N/A	-
1 January 2020	(England) John Johnson	(India) ATK	N/A	-
1 January 2020	(India) Lovepreet Singh	(India) Kerala Blasters	(India) Indian Arrows	Loan
1 January 2020	(India) Lara Sharma	(India) ATK	(India) ATK B	–
5 January 2020	(India) Keegan Pereira	(India) Jamshedpur	N/A	Free Agent
5 January 2020	(India) Augustin Fernandes	(India) Jamshedpur	N/A	Free Agent
5 January 2020	(India) Tarif Akhand	(India) Hyderabad	(India) Chennai City	Loan
7 January 2020	(India) Pratesh Shirodkar	(India) Goa	(India) Dempo	Free
7 January 2020	(India) Imran Khan	(India) Goa	(India) NEROCA	Free
8 January 2020	(India) Abhash Thapa	(India) Hyderabad	(India) East Bengal	Loan
9 January 2020	(Ghana) Asamoah Gyan	(India) NorthEast	N/A	–
14 January 2020	(India) Edmund Lalrindika	(India) Bengaluru	(India) East Bengal	Loan
20 January 2020	(India) Gourav Mukhi	(India) Jamshedpur	(India) Jamshedpur B	–
23 January 2020	(Australia) Dario Vidošić	(India) ATK	(India) N/A	–
25 January 2020	(India) Anuj Kumar	(India) Hyderabad	(India) Indian Arrows	Loan
27 January 2020	(Spain) Aridane Santana	(India) Odisha	(Spain) Cultural Leonesa	End of Loan
30 January 2020	(Spain) Carlos Calvo	(India) Jamshedpur	(Malta) Sliema Wanderers	Free
1 February 2020	(India) Robin Singh	(India) Hyderabad	(India) Real Kashmir	Loan
2 February 2020	(India) Avilash Paul	(India) ATK	(India) Mohun Bagan	Loan
12 February 2020	(Brazil) Raphael Augusto	(India) Bengaluru	N/A	Free Agent
