= 2020 I-League qualifiers =

13th season of the I-League 2nd Division

I-League qualifiers
- Season: 2019–20
- Champions: Mohammedan
- Promoted: Mohammedan
- Matches: 54
- Goals: 148 (2.74 per match)
- Highest attendance: 1,209
- Lowest attendance: 23
- Average attendance: 239

The 2020 I-League qualifiers (also known as Hero I-League Qualifiers 2020 for sponsorship reasons) was the 13th season of I-League 2nd Division, the second division of Indian football league, since its establishment in 2008. The league was kicked-off from 25 January 2020.

The season was shortened due to COVID-19 pandemic in India and Mohammedan won the league, being promoted to 2020–21 I-League.

== Teams ==
This season, 17 teams participated, including one reserve side from I-League (Punjab) and eight from Indian Super League (ATK, Jamshedpur, Hyderabad, Bengaluru, Chennaiyin, Mumbai City, Goa and Kerala Blasters). All the teams had been divided into three groups of six teams in A and C, and five teams in group B. The teams which made their debut this season were Bengaluru United, Rajasthan FC, Punjab FC (reserves), Hyderabad FC (reserves) and Mumbai City FC (reserves). Indian Arrows reserves were supposed to debut this season, but later withdrew, since it consists of U-16 and U-18 players, which had their board examinations.

=== Stadiums and locations ===
Locations of the 2019–20 I-League 2nd Division teams
Locations of the stadiums for I-league Qualifiers

Team	City/State	Stadium	Capacity
ARA	Ahmedabad, Gujarat	EKA Arena	22,000
ATK (R)	Barasat, West Bengal	Aditya Academy Ground	10,000
Rajasthan	Jodhpur, Rajasthan	Maharaja Umed Singh Stadium	6,000
Bengaluru (R)	Bengaluru, Karnataka	Bengaluru Football Stadium	8,400
Bengaluru United	Bengaluru, Karnataka	Bengaluru Football Stadium	8,400
Bhawanipore	Kolkata, West Bengal	Kalyani Stadium	20,000
Chennaiyin (R)	Chennai, Tamil Nadu	SSN College Ground	400
Garhwal	New Delhi, Delhi	Ambedkar Stadium	35,000
Goa (R)	Margao, Goa	GMC Stadium	3,200
Hyderabad (R)	Hyderabad, Telangana	Gachibowli Athletic Stadium	30,000
Jamshedpur (R)	Jamshedpur, Jharkhand	JRD Tata Sports Complex	24,500
Kerala	Thrissur, Kerala	Thrissur Municipal Corporation Stadium	15,000
Kerala Blasters (R)	Ernakulam, Kerala	Panampally Ground	300
Lonestar Kashmir	Katra, Jammu and Kashmir	SMVDSB Sports Complex	2,600
Mohammedan	Howrah, West Bengal	Sailen Manna Stadium	15,000
Mumbai City (R)	Mumbai, Maharashtra	Cooperage Ground	5,000
Punjab (R)	Ludhiana, Punjab	Guru Nanak Stadium	15,000

Due to COVID-19 pandemic, all the rescheduled matches after COVID-19 pandemic, will be played in a single venue. AIFF declared Kolkata and Kalyani as the venue on 14 August for the final round after cancelling the remaining matches of the preliminary round. Matches will be played at Kalyani Stadium in Kalyani and at Salt Lake Stadium in Kolkata.

=== Personnel and kits ===
Team	Manager	Kit manufacturer	Shirt sponsor
ARA	(India) Vivek Nagul	SEVEN	Amul
ATK (R)	(India) Deggie Cardozo	Nivia	
Bengaluru (R)	(India) Naushad Moosa	Puma	Kia Motors
Bengaluru United	(India) Richard Hood	MS Sportswear	The Organic World
Bhawanipore	(India) Sankarlal Chakraborty	Cosco	Sangbad Pratidin
Chennaiyin (R)	(India) Santosh Kashyap	Performax	Apollo Tyres
Garhwal	(India) Vikas Rawat	Vector X	ONGC
Goa (R)	(India) Clifford Miranda	T10	Adda52.com
Hyderabad (R)	(India) Anshul Katiyar	Reyaur Sports	Jai Raj Steel
Jamshedpur (R)	(India) Noel Wilson	Nivia	Tata Steel
Kerala	(India) TG Purushothaman	Cosco	Yologans
Kerala Blasters (R)	(India) Renjith Ajithkumar	Reyaur Sports	Muthoot
Lonestar Kashmir	(Japan) Kenichi Yatsuhashi	Kaizen	Rising Kashmir
Mohammedan	(England) Sol Campbell	Kaizen	TRAK Only
Mumbai City (R)	(India) Mohan Das	Squad Gear	SportsAdda
Punjab (R)	(Republic of Ireland) Curtis Fleming	Spartan	Apollo Tyres
Rajasthan	(India) Mangesh Desai	AIO Sports	AU Small Finance Bank

=== Managerial changes ===
Team	Outgoing manager	Manner of departure	Incoming manager	Date of appointment
Mohammedan	(India) Raghunath Nandi	2019	(India) Yan Law	2020
Lonestar Kashmir	(Spain) Miki Lladó	2019	(Japan) Kenichi Yatsuhashi	2020

=== Foreign players ===
Each club, excluding the reserve sides, can register three foreign players in their squad. One of the foreign players has to be from an AFC Member Nation.

Team	Player 1	Player 2	Asian Visa
ARA	(Nigeria) Eze Stanley	(Guinea) Camara Bakia	(Nepal) Rajesh Pariyar
Rajasthan	(Ghana) Collins Patterson		(Indonesia) Muhammad Iqbal
Bengaluru United	(Trinidad and Tobago) Robert Primus	(Ghana) William Opoku	
Bhawanipore	(Ghana) Philip Adjah	(Liberia) Ansumana Kromah	
Garhwal	(Nigeria) Bala Dahir	(Nigeria) Ekomobong Victor Philip	
Kerala	(Ivory Coast) Cyrille Brohiri		
Lonestar Kashmir	(Cameroon) Ellon Maxwell	(Ivory Coast) Bema Coulibaly	
Mohammedan	(Trinidad and Tobago) Willis Plaza	(Nigeria) Eze Kingsley	(Nepal) Abhishek Rijal

== Preliminary round ==
Tiebreakers
The teams are ranked according to points (3 points for a win, 1 point for a draw, 0 points for a loss). If two or more teams are equal on points on completion of the group matches, the following criteria are applied in the order given to determine the rankings:
1. Greater number of points obtained in the matches between the Teams concerned
2. Goal difference resulting from the matches between the Teams concerned
3. Greater number of goals scored in the matches between the Teams concerned
4. Goal difference in all the matches
5. Greater number of goals scored in all the matches
6. Drawing of lots

=== Group A ===
Pos	Team	Pld	W	D	L	GF	GA	GD	Pts	Qualification
1	**Garhwal** (Note: Due to the COVID-19 pandemic in India, a shorter format of the league was announced. Therefore, only the top 6 non-reserve clubs advanced to the Final round.)	7	4	2	1	14	8	+6	14	Advance to Final round
2	ATK (R) (Note: Reserves team are ineligible for advancing to the next round. To qualify for promotion, club must hold a 2nd Division license (marked in bold in the table), finish in the top 4, and either 1st or 2nd among the promotion-eligible clubs.)	8	4	2	2	10	9	+1	14	
3	Jamshedpur (R)	8	2	4	2	7	9	−2	10	
4	Punjab (R)	6	3	0	3	8	5	+3	9	
5	Rajasthan (Note: Withdrew team from the league due to financial and other constraits.)	6	1	2	3	4	7	−3	5	Eliminated
6	Lonestar Kashmir	7	1	2	4	8	13	−5	5	Eliminated

==== Results ====
Home \ Away	ATK	GFC	JFC	LFC	PFC	RFC
ATK (R)	—	1–4	0–0	2–0	2–1	1–1
Garhwal	1–0	—	2–2			1–0
Jamshedpur (R)		1–0	—	1–2	0–3	0–0
Lonestar Kashmir	1–2	3–3	2–2	—	0–1	0–2
Punjab (R)	1–2		0–1		—	2–0
Rajasthan		1–3				—

Legend: Blue = home team win; Yellow = draw; Red = away team win.

==== Fixtures and results ====
25 January 2020 1	**ATK (R)**	**0–0**	**Jamshedpur (R)**	Barasat
2:00				Stadium: Aditya Academy Ground; Attendance: 700; Referee: Ashish Tiwari

27 January 2020 2	**Lonestar Kashmir**	**0–2**	**Rajasthan**	Katra
2:00			5' Arvind Sharma; 41' Ishaan Shahi	Stadium: VDSB Sports Complex; Attendance: 52; Referee: Aditya Purkyastha

31 January 2020 3	**Punjab (R)**	**2–0**	**Rajasthan**	Gurgaon
2:00	Himanshu Jangra 6', 51'			Stadium: Tau Devi Lal Stadium; Attendance: 250; Referee: Lakshay

1 February 2020 4	**Lonestar Kashmir**	**3–3**	**Garhwal**	Katra
2:00	Shakir Sheikh 18', 28'; Maxwell Ellon 84'		3' Abhishek Rawat; 29', 90+4' Ekombong Philip	Stadium: VDSB Sports Complex; Attendance: 65; Referee: Jatinder Singh

5 February 2020 5	**Garhwal**	**1–0**	**ATK (R)**	New Delhi
2:00	Bahir Dala 44'			Stadium: Ambedkar Stadium; Attendance: 350

5 February 2020 6	**Jamshedpur (R)**	**0–0**	**Rajasthan**	Jamshedpur
2:00				Stadium: JRD Tata Sports Complex; Attendance: 40

8 February 2020 7	**Lonestar Kashmir**	**0–1**	**Punjab (R)**	Katra
2:00			57' Lalrinchhana Lallawmpuia	Stadium: VDSB Sports Complex; Attendance: 100

9 February 2020 8	**ATK (R)**	**1–1**	**Rajasthan**	Barasat
2:30	Joseph Vanlalhruaia 11'		84' Martand Raina	Stadium: Aditya Academy Ground; Attendance: 76

9 February 2020 9	**Garhwal**	**2–2**	**Jamshedpur (R)**	New Delhi
3:00	Ekomobomg Philip 20'; Nirmal Bisht 37'		49', 90+6' Billu Teli	Stadium: Ambedkar Stadium; Attendance: 550

13 February 2020 10	**Jamshedpur (R)**	**1–2**	**Lonestar Kashmir**	Jamshedpur
2:30	Billu Teli 45+1'		32' Maxwell Ellon; 37' Shakir Ahmad Shaikh	Stadium: JRD Tata Sports Complex; Attendance: 237

16 February 2020 11	**Garhwal**	**1–0**	**Rajasthan**	Delhi
3:00	Ekomobong Philip 8'			Stadium: Ambedkar Stadium; Attendance: 500

17 February 2020 12	**ATK (R)**	**2–0**	**Lonestar Kashmir**	Barasat
2:00	Yumnam Singh 56'; William Pauliankhum 86'			Stadium: Aditya Academy Ground; Attendance: 50

20 February 2020 13	**ATK (R)**	**2–1**	**Punjab (R)**	Barasat
2:30	William Pauliankhum 14'; Ashish Jha 52'		12' Maheson Tongbram	Stadium: Aditya Academy Ground; Attendance: 250

21 February 2020 14	**Rajasthan**	**1–3**	**Garhwal**	Jodhpur
3:00	Rohit Atkan 11'		20' Nirmal Bisht; 43', 85' Aman Thapa	Stadium: Umaid Singh Stadium; Attendance: 200

23 February 2020 15	**Jamshedpur (R)**	**0–3**	**Punjab (R)**	Jamshedpur
2:30			17' Thockhom Adison Singh; 55' Ashangbam Aphaoba Singh; 63' Saurabh Bhanwala	Stadium: JRD Tata Sports Complex; Attendance: 200

25 February 2020 16	**Lonestar Kashmir**	**1–2**	**Jamshedpur (R)**	Katra
2:00				Stadium: VDSB Sports Complex; Attendance: 52

26 February 2020 17	**Punjab (R)**	**0–1**	**ATK (R)**	Gurgaon
2:00			20' Billu Teli	Stadium: Tau Devi Lal Stadium; Attendance: 110

29 February 2020 18	**Punjab (R)**	**1–2**	**ATK (R)**	Gurgaon
2:00	Aaron Rodrigues 5'		25', 80' William Pauliankhum	Stadium: Tau Devi Lal Stadium; Attendance: 105

1 March 2020 19	**Lonestar Kashmir**	**2–2**	**Jamshedpur (R)**	Srinagar
2:00	Shakir Sheikh 52', 89'		75' Harsha Parui; 90+4' Ritesh Perambara	Stadium: TRC Turf Ground; Attendance: 350

6 March 2020 20	**Jamshedpur (R)**	**1–0**	**Garhwal**	Jamshedpur
2:30	Harsha Parui 50'			Stadium: JRD Tata Sports Complex; Attendance: 60; Referee: Surojit Das

10 March 2020 21	**ATK (R)**	**1–4**	**Garhwal**	Barasat
2:30	William Pauliankhum 16'		Ekomobong Philip 28', 32', 48'; Aman Thapa 85'	Stadium: Aditya Academy Ground; Attendance: 125

=== Group B ===
Pos	Team	Pld	W	D	L	GF	GA	GD	Pts	Qualification
1	**Mohammedan** (Note: Due to the COVID-19 pandemic in India, a shorter format of the league was announced. Therefore, all the non-reserve clubs advanced to the Final Round.)	6	4	0	2	13	6	+7	**12**	Advance to Final round
2	**Bhawanipore**	5	2	2	1	7	7	0	**8**	Advance to Final round
3	Hyderabad (R) (Note: Reserves team are ineligible for advance to the next round To qualify for promotion, a club must hold a 2nd Division license (marked in bold in the table), and finish both in the top 4 of the AIFF, and either 1st or 2nd among the promotion-eligible clubs.)	6	2	2	2	6	6	0	**8**	
4	Chennaiyin (R)	7	2	2	3	8	12	−4	**8**	
5	Bengaluru (R)	6	2	0	4	8	11	−3	**6**	

==== Results ====
Home \ Away	BFC	BHP	CFC	HFC	MDS
Bengaluru (R)	—			2–0	1–3
Bhawanipore	4–2	—	1–0		0–3
Chennaiyin (R)	3–2	1–1	—	1–3	3–1
Hyderabad (R)	0–1	1–1	0–0	—	2–1
Mohammedan	1–0		4–0		—

Legend: Blue = home team win; Yellow = draw; Red = away team win.

==== Fixtures and results ====
25 January 2020 1	**Bhawanipore**	**0–3**	**Mohammedan**	Kolkata
2:00			2' Sanjib Ghosh; 26' John Chidi; 79' Sattyam Sharma	Stadium: Kalyani Stadium; Attendance: 300

27 January 2020 1	**Chennaiyin (R)**	**3–2**	**Bengaluru (R)**	Chennai
3:00	Balkar Singh 36'; Zonunmawia 61'; Senthamizhi 85'		33' Biswa Darjee; 83' Advait	Stadium: SSN Ground; Attendance: 40

31 January 2020 1	**Chennaiyin (R)**	**1–1**	**Bhawanipore**	Chennai
3:30	Balkar Singh 41'		26' Anup Theres Raj	Stadium: SSN Ground; Attendance: 100

6 February 2020 1	**Chennaiyin (R)**	**1–3**	**Hyderabad (R)**	Chennai
3:30	Sarif Khan 64'		13' Nikhil Prabhu; 53' Ishan Dey; 90+2' Gani Ahmed Nigam	Stadium: SSN Ground; Attendance: 50

11 February 2020 1	**Mohammedan**	**1–0**	**Bengaluru (R)**	Howrah
2:00	Jiten Murmu 48'			Stadium: Howrah Ground; Attendance: 1200

14 February 2020 1	**Bhawanipore**	**4–2**	**Bengaluru (R)**	Howrah
2:30	Pankaj Moula 18', 56'; Anup Theres Raj 58'; Pradeep Mohanraj 83'		27' Bekey Oram; 65' (o.g.) Nitish Hazra	Stadium: Howrah Ground; Attendance: 20

18 February 2020 1	**Hyderabad (R)**	**1–1**	**Bhawanipore**	Hyderabad
3:30	Ghani Ahmmed Nigam 33'		18' Sourav Dasgupta	Stadium: Gachibowli Athletic Stadium; Attendance: 125

20 February 2020 1	**Mohammedan**	**4–0**	**Chennaiyin (R)**	Kalyani
2:30	Sanjib Ghosh 45+1'; John Chidi Uzodinma 59'; Balwinder Singh 67'; Jaskaranpreet Singh 87'			Stadium: Kalyani Stadium; Attendance: 200

23 February 2020 1	**Bhawanipore**	**1–0**	**Bengaluru (R)**	Kalyani
2:30	Pankaj Moula 63'			Stadium: Kalyani Stadium; Attendance: 75

26 February 2020	**Hyderabad (R)**	**2–1**	**Mohammedan**	Hyderabad
3:30	Abhishek Halder 50'; Kynsailang Khongsit 89'		72' Tirthankar Sarkar	Stadium: Gachibowli Athletic Stadium; Attendance: 200

29 February 2020	**Bengaluru (R)**	**2–0**	**Hyderabad (R)**	Bangalore
3:30	Bekey Oram 75'; Biswa Darjee 87'			Stadium: Bangalore Football Stadium; Attendance: 100

2 March 2020	**Chennaiyin (R)**	**3–1**	**Mohammedan**	Chennai
3:30	Balkar Singh 65'; Senthamizhi S 90+3', 90+5'		19' Vanlalbiaa Changte	Stadium: SSN Ground; Attendance: 25

5 March 2020	**Bengaluru (R)**	**1–3**	**Mohammedan**	Bangalore
3:30	Biswa Darjee 74'		John Chidi 40', 75', 88'	Stadium: Bangalore Football Stadium; Attendance: 455

7 March 2020	**Hyderabad (R)**	**0–0**	**Chennaiyin (R)**	Hyderabad
3:30				Stadium: Gachibowli Athletic Stadium; Attendance: 50

=== Group C ===
Pos	Team	Pld	W	D	L	GF	GA	GD	Pts	Qualification
1	**ARA** (Note: Due to the COVID-19 pandemic in India, a shorter format of the league was announced. Therefore, all the non-reserve clubs advanced to the Final Round.)	7	4	2	1	15	6	+9	14	Advance to Final Round
2	**Bengaluru United**	8	4	2	2	12	6	+6	14	Advance to Final Round
3	Kerala (Note: Withdrew team from the league due to financial and other constraints.)	7	2	3	2	9	7	+2	9	Pulled out from league
4	Goa (R) (Note: Reserves team are ineligible for advance to the next round To qualify for promotion, a club must hold a 2nd Division license (marked in bold in the table), and finish both in the top 4 of the AIFF, and either 1st or 2nd among the promotion-eligible clubs.)	6	2	3	1	8	6	+2	9	
5	Kerala Blasters (R)	7	1	2	4	8	14	−6	5	
6	Mumbai City (R)	7	1	2	4	4	17	−13	5	

==== Results ====
Home \ Away	ARA	BUD	FCG	FCK	KBS	MFC
ARA	—	1–0		2–0	2–2	5–0
Bengaluru United	1–0	—	1–1	1–1	1–3	6–0
Goa (R)	2–2	0–1	—	1–0		
Kerala			1–1	—	3–0	
Kerala Blasters (R)			1–3	1–3	—	1–1
Mumbai City (R)	1–3	0–1		1–1	1–0	—

Legend: Blue = home team win; Yellow = draw; Red = away team win.

==== Fixtures and results ====
25 January 2020 1	**Kerala**	**3–0**	**Kerala Blasters (R)**	Trissur
2:00	Sajeesh E 6', 65'; Roshan Gigi 18'			Stadium: Corporation Stadium; Attendance: 700

25 January 2020 1	**ARA**	**5–0**	**Mumbai City (R)**	Ahmedabad
2:00	Syed Shoaib Ahmed 3', 19', 52'; Dieye Hamidou 36'; Parminder Singh 63'			Stadium: The Arena; Attendance: 450

29 January 2020 1	**Goa**	**0–1**	**Bengaluru United**	Nagoa Ground
3:30			78' Amey Bhatkal	Attendance: 250

2 February 2020 1	**ARA**	**2–0**	**Kerala**	Ahmedabad
3:30	Syed Shoaib Ahmed 72'; Dieye Hamidou 32'			Stadium: The Arena; Attendance: 300

2 February 2020 1	**Mumbai (R)**	**0–1**	**Bengaluru United**	Mumbai
7:45			83' Asraf Mondal	Stadium: Cooperage Ground; Attendance: 200

6 February 2020 1	**ARA**	**1–0**	**Bengaluru United**	Ahmedabad
3:30	Dieye Hamidou 1'			Stadium: The Arena; Attendance: 250

6 February 2020 1	**Mumbai (R)**	**1–1**	**F.C. Kerala**	Mumbai
7:30	Melwin Thomas 89' (o.g.)		74' Mousoof Naizan	Stadium: Cooperage Ground; Attendance: 160

8 February 2020 1	**Kerala Blasters (R)**	**1–3**	**Goa (R)**	Kochi
3:30	Ronaldo Oliveira 48'		33', 65' Lalawmpuia; 88' Flan Gomes	Stadium: Panampally Ground; Attendance: 50

12 February 2020 1	**Kerala**	**1–1**	**Goa (R)**	Trissur
3:15	Brohiri Cyrille 25'		7' Lalmangaih Sanga	Stadium: Corporation Stadium; Attendance: 200

13 February 2020 1	**Mumbai (R)**	**1–0**	**Kerala Blasters (R)**	Mumbai
7:30	Shreyas Vatekar 24'			Stadium: Cooperage Stadium; Attendance: 200

17 February 2020 1	**Bengaluru United**	**1–3**	**Kerala Blasters (R)**	Bangalore
3:30	Phrangki Buam 44'		17' Shaiborlang Kharpan; 30', 35' Ronaldo Oliveira	Stadium: Bangalore Football Stadium; Attendance: 250

18 February 2020 1	**Goa**	**2–2**	**ARA**	Bambolim
4:00	Kapil Hoble 48'; Nestor Dias 87'		31' Dieye Hamidou; 88' Parmimder Singh	Stadium: Bambolim Stadium; Attendance: 200

22 February 2020 1	**Bengaluru United**	**1–0**	**ARA**	Bangalore
3:30	Nikhil Vijay Pal 90'			Stadium: Bangalore Football Stadium; Attendance: 200

26 February 2020	**Bengaluru United**	**1–1**	**Kerala**	Bangalore
3:30	Phrangki Buam 78'		71' Nikhil Raj	Stadium: Bangalore Football Stadium; Attendance: 450

26 February 2020	**Goa**	**3–0**	**Mumbai (R)**	Nagoa
4:00	Kapil Hoble 16'; Aaren Dsilva 55'; Sarineo Fernandes 70'			Stadium: Nagoa Ground; Attendance: 500

27 February 2020	**ARA**	**2–2**	**Kerala Blasters (R)**	Ahmedabad
3:30	Dieye Hamidou 22', 68'		7' Shahajas; 62' Ronaldo Oliveira	Stadium: The Arena; Attendance: 150

1 March 2020	**Bengaluru United**	**6–0**	**Mumbai (R)**	Bangalore
3:30	Phrangki Buam 78'			Stadium: Bangalore Football Stadium; Attendance: 450

3 March 2020 1	**Kerala Blasters (R)**	**1–3**	**Kerala**	Kochi
3:30	Samuel Kynshi 73'		30', 45' Brohiri Cyrille; 58' Sreekuttan VS	Stadium: Panampally Ground; Attendance: 250

6 March 2020	**Mumbai (R)**	**1–3**	**ARA**	Mumbai
7:30	Kamran Ateeque Ansari 46'		Syed Shoaib Ahmed 9', 87', 89'	Stadium: Cooperage Ground; Referee: Mrutyunjay Ligaraj Amatya

7 March 2020	**Goa**	**1–0**	**Kerala**	Nagoa
4:00	Flan Gomes 54'			Stadium: Nagoa Ground; Attendance: 200

10 March 2020	**Kerala Blasters (R)**	**1–1**	**Mumbai (R)**	Kochi
3:30	Naorem Mahesh 21'		35' (o.g.) Zahid Mir	Stadium: Panampally Ground; Attendance: 60

== I-League qualifiers ==
Due to the COVID-19 pandemic in India, usual final round format was scrapped off. It was decided that the final round of the league will be rescheduled into a new format and all the non-reserve teams from the preliminary stage will automatically progress to this round. It was officially named as I-League Qualifiers. The teams in this round will play in a round-robin format in two venues, at Salt Lake Stadium in Kolkata and Kalyani Stadium in Kalyani, near Kolkata. The team with highest points would advance to the 2020–21 I-League. Out of the eight non-reserve teams, FC Kerala, Lonestar Kashmir FC and Rajasthan FC pulled out from tournament due to financial and other constraints.

Tiebreakers
The teams are ranked according to points (3 points for a win, 1 point for a draw, 0 points for a loss). If two or more teams are equal on points on completion of the group matches, the following criteria are applied in the order given to determine the rankings:
1. Greater number of points obtained in the matches between the Teams concerned
2. Goal difference resulting from the matches between the Teams concerned
3. Greater number of goals scored in the matches between the Teams concerned
4. Goal difference in all the matches
5. Greater number of goals scored in all the matches
6. Drawing of lots

=== Final round ===
Pos	Team	Pld	W	D	L	GF	GA	GD	Pts	Qualification
1	Mohammedan (C)	4	3	1	0	7	1	+6	10	Champion and Promotion to 2020–21 I-League
2	Bhawanipore	4	3	0	1	6	3	+3	9	
3	Bengaluru United	4	1	2	1	2	3	−1	5	
4	ARA	4	0	2	2	3	8	−5	2	
5	Garhwal	4	0	1	3	3	6	−3	1	

Source: I League
(C) Champions

=== Results ===
Home \ Away	GFC	BHP	MDS	BUD	ARA
Garhwal	—				
Bhawanipore	2–1	—			
Mohammedan	1–0	2–0	—		
Bengaluru United	1–0	0–2	0–0	—	
ARA	1–1	0–2	1–4	1–1	—

Source: I League
Legend: Blue = home team win; Yellow = draw; Red = away team win.

==== Fixtures and results ====
8 October 2020 1	Bhawanipore	2–0	Bengaluru United	Kolkata, West Bengal
12:30	Pankaj Moula 45+4'; Philip Adjah 60'	Report		Stadium: Salt Lake Stadium; Attendance: 0 Referee: Santosh Kumar

8 October 2020 1	Mohammedan	1–0	Garhwal	Kalyani, West Bengal
16:30	Munmun Lugun 90+3'	Report		Stadium: Kalyani Stadium; Attendance: 0 Referee: Ajit Kumar Meitei

11 October 2020 2	Mohammedan	4–1	ARA	Kolkata, West Bengal
12:30	Willis Plaza 13'; Abhishek Rijal 35', 45'; SK Faiaz 88'	Report	Safiul Rahman 53' (o.g.)	Stadium: Salt Lake Stadium; Attendance: 0 Referee: Raktim Saha

11 October 2020 2	Garhwal	0–1	Bengaluru United	Kalyani, West Bengal
16:30		Report	William Opoku 8'	Stadium: Kalyani Stadium; Attendance: 0 Referee: Senthil Nathan Sekaran

14 October 2020 3	Garhwal	1–2	Bhawanipore	Kolkata, West Bengal
12:30	Afdal VK 76'	Report	Philip Adjah 8'; Pankaj Moula 50'	Stadium: Salt Lake Stadium; Attendance: 0 Referee: Raktim Saha

14 October 2020 3	Bengaluru United	1–1	ARA	Kalyani, West Bengal
16:30	Asrar Rehbar 97'	Report	Pratik Swami 36'	Stadium: Kalyani Stadium; Attendance: 0 Referee: Ashwin

16 October 2020 4	ARA	1–1	Garhwal	Kalyani, West Bengal
12:30	Surajit Seal 83'	Report	Neeraj Bhandari 17'	Stadium: Kalyani Stadium; Attendance: 0 Referee: Jehrul Islam

16 October 2020 4	Bhawanipore	0–2	Mohammedan	Kalyani, West Bengal
16:30		Report	Vanlalbiaa Chhangte 27'; Gani Nigam 67'	Stadium: Kalyani Stadium; Attendance: 0 Referee: Ajit Kumar Meitei

19 October 2020 5	Bengaluru United	0–0	Mohammedan	Kolkata, West Bengal
14:00		Report		Stadium: Salt Lake Stadium; Attendance: 0 Referee: Santosh Kumar

19 October 2020 5	ARA	0–2	Bhawanipore	Kalyani, West Bengal
14:00		Report	Jiten Murmu 17'; Supriya Pandit 21'	Stadium: Kalyani Stadium; Attendance: 0 Referee: Ashwin

== Season statistics ==
=== Top scorers ===
As of 11 March 2020

Rank	Player	Club	Goals
1	(India) Syed Shoaib Ahmed	ARA	7
1	(Nigeria) Ekombong Victor Philip	Garhwal	7
3	(Senegal) Dieye Hamidou	ARA	6
4	(India) Shakir Ahmed Sheikh	Lonestar Kashmir	5
4	(Nigeria) John Chidi Uzodinma	Mohammedan	5
4	(India) William Pauliankhum	ATK (R)	5
7	(India) Billu Teli	Jamshedpur (R)	4
7	(India) Ronaldo Oliveira	Kerala Blasters (R)	4

=== Hat-tricks ===
As of 11 March 2020

Player	For	Against	Result	Date	Ref
(India) Syed Shoaib Ahmed	ARA	Mumbai City (R)	5–0	25 January 2020	
(India) Mohammad Asrar Rehbar	Bengaluru United	Mumbai City (R)	6–0	1 March 2020	
(Nigeria) John Chidi Uzodinma	Mohammedan	Bengaluru (R)	3–1	5 March 2020	
(India) Syed Shoaib Ahmed	ARA	Mumbai (R)	3–1	6 March 2020	
(Nigeria) Ekombong Victor Philip	Garhwal	ATK (R)	4–1	10 March 2020	

=== Cleansheets ===
As of 11 March 2020

Rank	Player	Club	Clean sheets
1	(India) Srijith R	Bengaluru United	4
2	(India) Iprotip Das	ARA	3
2	(India) Priyant Singh	Mohammedan	3
4	(India) Nitin Meel	Rajasthan	2
4	(India) Raj Kumar Mahato	Jamshedpur (R)	2
4	(India) Amrit Gope	Jamshedpur (R)	2
4	(India) Ahamed Afsar	Kerala	2
4	(India) Lara Sharma	ATK (R)	2
4	(India) Sayak Barai	Garhwal	2
4	(India) Antonio da Silva	Goa (R)	2

== Average home attendances ==
As of 11 March 2020

Team	GP	Cumulative	High	Low	Mean
F.C. Kerala	2	900	700	200	450
ARA	4	1150	450	150	287
Bhawanipore	3	395	300	20	131
Rajasthan	2	200	200	200	200
Lonestar Kashmir	4	567	350	52	141
Garhwal	3	1400	550	350	466
Mohammedan	2	1400	1200	200	700
Bengaluru United	4	1050	450	150	262
ATK (R)	5	1201	700	50	240
Goa (R)	4	1250	500	200	312
Mumbai City (R)	4	760	200	160	190
Kerala Blasters (R)	3	360	250	50	120
Bengaluru (R)	2	555	455	100	277
Chennaiyin (R)	4	215	100	25	53
Hyderabad (R)	3	375	200	50	125
Punjab (R)	3	465	250	105	155
Jamshedpur (R)	4	697	237	60	174
Total	54	12,940	1200	20	239
