= Yaw Preko =

Ghanaian footballer

Personal information
- Date of birth: 8 September 1974 (age 52)
- Place of birth: Ghana
- Height: 1.80 m (5 ft 11 in)
- Position: Forward

Team information
- Current team: Ghana U20 (Manager)

Youth career
- Kotobabi Powerlines
- 1988–1990: Power
- 1990–1991: Hearts of Oak

Senior career*
Years	Team	Apps	(Gls)
–1990	Power	0	(0)
1991–1992	Hearts of Oak	31	(9)
1992–1997	Anderlecht	92	(27)
1997–1999	Gaziantepspor	58	(16)
1999–2000	Fenerbahçe	22	(7)
2000–2002	Yimpaş Yozgatspor	55	(21)
2002–2004	Gaziantepspor	4	(3)
2004–2005	Halmstad	49	(11)
2005–2007	Al-Ettifaq		(≥4)
2007	Hoang Anh Gia Lai	2	(0)
Total		≥313	(≥98)

International career
1991	Ghana U17	5	(0)
1992	Ghana U23	6	(0)
1992–2001	Ghana	68	(≥7)

Managerial career
- 2012–2013: Ghana U20 (assistant)
- 2015–2016: Hearts of Oak (assistant)
- 2016: Hearts of Oak (caretaker)
- 2016: Ifeanyi Ubah (assistant)
- 2016–2017: Ifeanyi Ubah
- 2018–2019: Ghana U17 (assistant)
- 2019: Kings Palace FC (assistant)
- 2019–: Ghana U20
- * Club domestic league appearances and goals

Medal record

Men's association football

Representing Ghana

Olympic Games
Bronze medal – third place	1992 Barcelona	Team competition

Yaw Preko (born 8 September 1974 in Accra) is a former football striker from Ghana. He is currently the manager of Ghana U20.

== Club career ==
His career started with Kotobabi Powerlines, a small Ghanaian club, and his first European club was R.S.C. Anderlecht where he became Belgian champion three times. He played in Turkey from 1997 to 2004 before joining Halmstads BK in the Allsvenskan. He then left Halmstads BK in 2005 as the club did not renew his contract, he signed for Saudi Arabian team Al-Ettifaq and stayed with them for almost 2 years and then signed for HAGL in the Vietnamese V-League, which he left after one season. A free agent, Preko subsequently announced his interest of returning home to the Ghanaian league.

== International career ==
Preko won the 1991 FIFA U-17 World Championship with Ghana U17, and played with Ghana U23 at the 1992 Summer Olympics; he mentioned in a June 2012 interview that he played youth international football using a false date of birth.

He has played 68 international matches for the Ghana national team, and was a member of the team that won the bronze medal at the 1992 Summer Olympics in Barcelona.

== Coaching career ==
From December 2012 to July 2013, Preko was the assistant manager of Ghana's U20 national team. In October 2015, he became assistant manager under Kenichi Yatsuhashi. On 30 October 2016, he was appointed caretaker manager replacing Sergio Traguil. However, the club decided to appoint a new manager at the end of October 2018 and two weeks later, he was reunited with Kenichi Yatsuhashi at Nigerian club Ifeanyi Ubah still as assistant manager. Yatsuhashi was sacked already sacked on 12 December 2016 and once again, Preko took over as a caretaker manager and later permanent manager. In January 2018, he was appointed assistant manager for Ghana's U17 national team.

In April 2019, he was appointed assistant manager of Ghanaian club Kings Palace FC, again under Kenichi Yatsuhashi. In June 2019, he was appointed manager of Ghana's U20 national team.

== Career statistics ==
=== International ===
Appearances and goals by national team and year (incomplete)
National team	Year	Apps	Goals
Ghana	1991	1	0
Ghana	1993	1	0
Ghana	1994	2	3
Ghana	1995	4	0
Ghana	1996	3	0
Ghana	1997	3	0
Ghana	1998	1	0
Ghana	1999	3	3
Ghana	2000	5	1
Ghana	2001	3	0
Total		26	7

Scores and results list Ghana's goal tally first, score column indicates score after each Preko goal.

List of international goals scored by Yaw Preko
No.	Date	Venue	Opponent	Score	Result	Competition	Ref.
1	16 October 1994	Stade Général Seyni Kountché, Niamey, Niger	Niger	1–0	5–1	1996 African Cup of Nations qualification	
2	16 October 1994	Stade Général Seyni Kountché, Niamey, Niger	Niger	2–1	5–1	1996 African Cup of Nations qualification	
3	16 October 1994	Stade Général Seyni Kountché, Niamey, Niger	Niger	5–1	5–1	1996 African Cup of Nations qualification	
4	28 February 1999	Accra Sports Stadium, Accra, Ghana	Eritrea	2–0	5–0	2000 Africa Cup of Nations qualification	
5	28 February 1999	Accra Sports Stadium, Accra, Ghana	Eritrea	3–0	5–0	2000 Africa Cup of Nations qualification	
6	28 February 1999	Accra Sports Stadium, Accra, Ghana	Eritrea	5–0	5–0	2000 Africa Cup of Nations qualification	
7	9 July 2000	Accra Sports Stadium, Accra, Ghana	Sierra Leone	4–0	5–0	2002 FIFA World Cup qualification	
