= 2020–21 SC East Bengal season =

Indian football club season

East Bengal
2020–21 season
- Owner: Shree Cement East Bengal Foundation
- Head coach: Robbie Fowler
- Stadium: Tilak Maidan Stadium (Note: Due to the COVID-19 pandemic in India, the 2020–21 Indian Super League would be held entirely in Goa, behind closed doors. East Bengal was allotted the Tilak Maidan Stadium as their home ground for the season.)
- Indian Super League: 9th
- Top goalscorer: League: Matti Steinmann (4); All: Matti Steinmann (4)
- Average home league attendance: Closed doors
- Biggest win: East Bengal 3–1 Odisha (3 January 2021)
Home colours	Away colours	Third colours

The 2020–21 season was the 101st season of Sporting Club East Bengal (EB or SCEB). Established in 1920, the club celebrated its centennial on 1 August 2020. Due to the COVID-19 pandemic, the Indian football season started on 1 August 2020 and is scheduled to end on 31 May 2021, with competitive matches occurring between November and March. The club competed in the Indian Super League (ISL) for the first time and finished their first ISL season in ninth place with 17 points.

Before the start of the season, East Bengal was very active in the transfer market. The club precontracted over 20 Indian players with many signing long-term contracts and being assigned to the reserve team. Only a few players were retained from the previous season. Of them, Prakash Sarkar and Boithang Haokip were not registered in the ISL squad. East Bengal and Quess Corp's joint venture was terminated, and the club inked a partnership with Shree Cement as their principal investor in September. Robbie Fowler was appointed as the team's head coach. Forward Bright Enobakhare was signed in the winter transfer window as the seventh foreigner. Another foreign player, Callum Woods, was also signed as a reserve defender.

Due to investor issues and COVID-19, East Bengal could not start its league preparation until October. The club began their campaign with a loss in the Kolkata Derby. East Bengal got their first point against Jamshedpur, after three consecutive defeats. They were undefeated for the next seven matches. They ended their campaign by losing against Odisha FC in an eleven-goal thriller, which was also the league's all-time highest scoring match. East Bengal's top goal scorer was Matti Steinmann with four goals in 17 matches. The club had six ISL Fans' Goal of the Week award from five players with four consecutive wins on week nine, 10, 11 and 12.

== Background ==
East Bengal officially announced that Balwant Singh had signed a two-year contract with the team on 12 April 2020. The next day the club signed former fullback Lalramchullova back from arch-rivals Mohun Bagan for the season as well as the services of Hyderabad defender Gurtej Singh.

On 18 April, the club announced a triple signing for the season: goalkeeper Rafique Ali Sardar from Jamshedpur, and Wahengbam Angousana and Loken Meitei from TRAU. The club announced the signing of three more Indian recruits: winger Bikash Jairu from Jamshedpur and midfielders Cavin Lobo and Sehnaj Singh from Punjab and ATK respectively, each on a two-year contract, on 28 April. After being stranded for more than a months due to lockdown all over India, the foreign contingent of the previous season squad started leaving for their home in the first week of May. The club announced four more signings: goalkeeper Sankar Roy from Mohun Bagan, defenders Mohammed Irshad from Gokulam Kerala, Keegan Pereira from Jamshedpur and Girik Khosla from Punjab on 5 May. The club announced three more signings on 15 May: midfielders Eugeneson Lyngdoh from Bengaluru, Mohammed Rafique from Mumbai City and Milan Singh from NorthEast United for the season. On 18 May, the club announced five more signings for the season: forward C. K. Vineeth from Jamshedpur, right-back Rino Anto from Bengaluru, left-back Pritam Kumar Singh from Kerala Blasters, defenders Anil Chawan from ATK and Vikas Saini from Mohammedan Sporting. Francisco Bruto Da Costa joined East Bengal as the interim assistant manager on 30 July 2020. The COVID-19 pandemic and lockdown led to the postponement of India's football season. It was announced that the season would start on 1 August 2020 and would continue until 31 May 2021.

=== Indian Super League entry ===
The club's previous club investor, Quess Corp, announced in Autumn 2019 that they would leave the joint venture at the end of the season. In January 2020, arch-rivals, Mohun Bagan entered the Indian Super League (ISL), the new top tier of Indian Football, by merging with the defending ISL champions ATK, adding pressure on the club on top of its financial woes. The club began searching for potential investors. Back in 2018, it chose Quess to participate in the ISL, but that did not materialise. There were rumours the club would merge with the Bhubaneshwar-based ISL club, Odisha FC, but the club owner denied them. In March, during the ongoing 2019-20 I-League, the COVID-19 pandemic and lockdown began halting everything. Quess unilaterally activated the force majeure clause and terminated all players' and staff' contracts a month before the official exit on 1 May 2020. This was the first time the clause was activated in Indian football. It was rumoured that American consumer goods company Procter & Gamble would be the principal sponsor of the club and with them, EB would play in the ISL.

After the football season was declared complete, the club signed around 20 players to precontracts for the following season, but all of them were considered void, as the club did not have the sporting rights to compete in any league. In June, AIFF asked about the club's ownership status post-Quess separation for club licensing criteria, or East Bengal might not be able to play in any recognised tournament. The final termination, No Objection Certificate and sporting right transfer was delayed, but on 17 July, the joint venture with Quess East Bengal Pvt. Ltd was officially terminated, and the club got back the sporting rights from the firm . In the meantime, the former owner of Punjab FC, Ranjit Bajaj, expressed interest in buying the 70% outstanding shares. That month, a Singapore-based company, USEL also showed an interest in the club but later backed off because of uncertainty of playing in the ISL. By the end of July, Football Sports Development Limited (FSDL), unofficially stated there would be no expansion in the seventh season during a meeting with the ten ISL clubs. Club officials asked FSDL to consider the club's participation in this season and allow more time for the team to finalise its investors. The players of East Bengal's ASEAN Club Championship-winning team wrote to the club saying its priority should be to support COVID-19-affected people and not playing in the ISL. This led to a controversy in the club. After the club's foundation day, AIFF secretary, Kushal Das aroused speculation over EB joining the ISL saying, "I want to say nothing is impossible. What steps East Bengal should take – I think it is very important that you have to change with time, you have to get professional people. You have to have different departments. You need to have a sponsor servicing department. The fact that Quess and East Bengal had to part ways was not a good thing." On the 1 August, the club's assistant general secretary said on a chat show, "Whenever it is possible, we will play in the ISL. But we cannot say when we can join ISL. It is a legacy club and it has its heritage. But we have to change ourselves a bit and we are trying to reach that point and when that happens we will join ISL. But we cannot say when it will happen.” On 12 August, the expansion of the I-League was announced and AIFF vice-president mentioned 12 teams in the league which included East Bengal. This increased speculation further.

On 2 September 2020, the club and Chief Minister Mamata Banerjee announced at the state secretariat Nabanna that Kolkata-based firm Shree Cement was the club's new investor. The next day, FSDL invited bids for interested clubs from Delhi, Ludhiana, Ahmedabad, Kolkata, Siliguri and Bhopal. On 15 September, the club officially confirmed that they had submitted their bid papers for entry to the 2020–21 Indian Super League. The participation of East Bengal in the ISL was also unofficially confirmed. The club was rebranded as Sporting Club East Bengal. On 27 September, FSDL announced East Bengal's move from the I-League to the Indian Super League for the 2020–21 season.

=== After entering the Indian Super League ===
The club announced former India captain Renedy Singh would be the team's new assistant coach and Liverpool legend Robbie Fowler was signed as the team's new head coach on 9 October. He would be assisted by Anthony Grant, who was alongside him at Brisbane Roar last season. The backroom staff would include former Tottenham Hotspurs' goalkeeper Bobby Mimms as the goalkeeper coach, and former Blackpool manager Terry McPhillips as the set-piece coach. Robbie Fowler would be assisted by Michael Harding, the former physio of Newcastle United. Jack Inman, Former sports scientist from Bury, and Joseph Walmsley, an analyst from Preston North End joined management. The team became the first club in India to appoint a set-piece coach.

East Bengal announced the signing of Australian defender Scott Neville on loan from Brisbane Roar for the season as their first official signing. He was also to be registered as the Asian foreigner for the Indian Super League campaign. SC East Bengal announced the signing of four more foreigners: Aaron Amadi-Holloway from Brisbane Roar, Anthony Pilkington and Danny Fox from Wigan Athletic and Matti Steinmann from Wellington Phoenix. The club announced the signing of the India national football team forward Jeje Lalpekhlua for the season. On 19 October, East Bengal announced the signing of their sixth foreigner, Congolese winger Jacques Maghoma, who had played for EFL Championship side Birmingham City in the previous season. The club announced the signing of former left-back Narayan Das from Odisha.

During an online interaction on the club's social media, coach Robbie Fowler said: "We will look to develop a competitive team and try and develop Indian talent as well. We all hope the league can get better, the ISL and as management, we think we can better." Later, the team management hired sports psychologist Nicola McCalliog to assist the team for the season. McCalliog had previously worked with several English Premier League sides and was also the Head of Player Welfare and Psychology at the Robbie Fowler Academy.

== Transfers ==
=== Incoming ===
No.	Pos.	Name	Signed from	Month	Fee	Ref
34	DF	(India) Novin Gurung	Real Kashmir	April	Free Transfer	
15	FW	(India) Balwant Singh	ATK	April	Free Transfer	
3	DF	(India) Gurtej Singh	Hyderabad	April	Free Transfer	
27	DF	(India) Lalramchullova	Mohun Bagan	April	Free Transfer	
14	MF	(India) Wahengbam Angousana	TRAU	April	Free Transfer	
33	MF	(India) Loken Meitei	TRAU	April	Free Transfer	
13	GK	(India) Rafique Ali Sardar	Jamshedpur	April	Free Transfer	
23	MF	(India) Bikash Jairu	Jamshedpur	April	Free Transfer	
—	MF	(India) Cavin Lobo	Punjab	April	Free Transfer	
26	MF	(India) Sehnaj Singh	ATK	April	Free Transfer	
28	FW	(India) Girik Khosla	Punjab	May	Free Transfer	
66	DF	(India) Mohammed Irshad	Gokulam Kerala	May	Free Transfer	
1	GK	(India) Sankar Roy	Mohun Bagan	May	Free Transfer	
—	DF	(India) Keegan Pereira	Jamshedpur	May	Free Transfer	
35	MF	(India) Milan Singh	NorthEast United	May	Free Transfer	
8	MF	(India) Mohammed Rafique	Mumbai City	May	Free Transfer	
18	MF	(India) Eugeneson Lyngdoh	Bengaluru	May	Free Transfer	
30	FW	(India) C. K. Vineeth	Jamshedpur	May	Free Transfer	
—	DF	(India) Rino Anto	Bengaluru	May	Free Transfer	
5	DF	(India) Anil Chawan	ATK	May	Free Transfer	
44	DF	(India) Pritam Kumar Singh	Kerala Blasters	May	Free Transfer	
—	DF	(India) Vikas Sahni	Mohammedan	May	Free Transfer	
21	DF	(India) Narayan Das	Odisha	October	Free Transfer	
24	GK	(India) Debjit Majumder	ATK	October	Free Transfer	
16	DF	(India) Rana Gharami	Bengaluru United	October	Free Transfer	
17	MF	(India) Yumnam Singh	Bhawanipore	October	Free Transfer	
29	MF	(India) Surchandra Singh	Mumbai City	October	Free Transfer	
12	FW	(India) Jeje Lalpekhlua	Chennaiyin	October	Free Transfer	
20	MF	(Wales) Aaron Amadi-Holloway	Brisbane Roar	October	Free Transfer	
4	DF	(Scotland) Danny Fox	Wigan Athletic	October	Free Transfer	
22	FW	(Republic of Ireland) Anthony Pilkington	Wigan Athletic	October	Free Transfer	
6	MF	(Germany) Matti Steinmann	Wellington Phoenix	October	Free Transfer	
19	MF	(Democratic Republic of the Congo) Jacques Maghoma	Birmingham City	October	Free Transfer	
34	FW	(India) Harmanpreet Singh	Indian Arrows	November	Free Transfer	
44	MF	(India) Haobam Tomba Singh	Classic Football Academy	November	Free Transfer	
45	DF	(England) Calum Woods	FCU Manchester	December	Free Transfer	
10	FW	(Nigeria) Bright Enobakhare	AEK Athens	January	Free Transfer	
55	DF	(India) Ankit Mukherjee	ATK Mohun Bagan	January	Free Transfer	
47	DF	(India) Raju Gaikwad	Kerala Blasters	January	Free Transfer	
40	GK	(India) Suvam Sen	United	January	Free Transfer	
70	CB	(India) Sarthak Golui	Mumbai City	February	Free Transfer	

=== Outgoing ===
No.	Pos.	Name	Signed to	Month	Fee	Ref
1	GK	(India) Lalthuammawia Ralte	Bengaluru	June	End of Loan	
4	DF	(Costa Rica) Jhonny Acosta	Deportivo Saprissa	June	Released	
5	DF	(India) Kamalpreet Singh	Odisha	June	Released	
6	DF	(India) Gurwinder Singh	—	June	Released	
7	MF	(India) Abhijit Sarkar	Chennaiyin	June	End of Loan	
11	MF	(India) Pintu Mahata	Sudeva	June	Released	
15	DF	(India) Abhash Thapa	Hyderabad	June	End of Loan	
16	MF	(France) Kassim Aidara	—	June	Released	
17	MF	(India) Edmund Lalrindika	Bengaluru	June	End of Loan	
18	FW	(Spain) Marcos de la Espada	CE L'Hospitalet	June	Released	
23	MF	(Spain) Juan Mera González	CD Lealtad	June	Released	
24	MF	(Spain) Víctor Pérez Alonso	—	June	Released	
26	FW	(India) Bidyashagar Singh	TRAU	June	Released	
28	DF	(India) Monotosh Chakladar	Pathachakra	June	End of Loan	
29	DF	(India) Mehtab Singh	Mumbai City	June	Released	
40	GK	(India) Rakshit Dagar	Sudeva Delhi	June	Released	
41	DF	(India) Manoj Mohammed	Mohammedan	September	Released	
43	MF	(India) PC Rohlupuia	Mumbai City	September	Released	
14	MF	(India) Naorem Tondomba Singh	Mumbai City	September	Released	
—	DF	(India) Vikas Saini	Churchill Brothers	December	Released	
8	MF	(Spain) Jaime Santos Colado	Palmaflor	January	Released	
20	MF	(India) Lalrindika Ralte	Real Kashmir	January	Released	
25	DF	(India) Samad Ali Mallick	Punjab	January	Released	
37	DF	(India) Abhishek Ambekar	Punjab	January	Released	
66	DF	(India) Mohammed Irshad	Sudeva Delhi	January	Released	

=== Loan in ===
No.	Pos.	Name	Loaned from	Month	End Date	Ref
2	DF	(Australia) Scott Neville	Brisbane Roar	October	End of Season	
31	DF	(India) Rohen Singh	Classic Football Academy	October	End of Season	
56	MF	(India) Ajay Chhetri	Bengaluru	January	End of Season	
91	GK	(India) Subrata Paul	Hyderabad	January	End of Season	
88	MF	(India) Sourav Das	Mumbai City	February	End of Season	

=== Loan out ===
No.	Pos.	Name	Team	Month	End Date	Ref
2	DF	(India) Asheer Akhtar	Mohammedan	September	End of season	
3	DF	(India) Gurtej Singh	Mohammedan	January	End of season	
13	GK	(India) Rafique Ali Sardar	Mohammedan	January	End of season	
30	MF	(India) Brandon Vanlalremdika	Aizawl	January	End of season	
1	GK	(India) Sankar Roy	Hyderabad	January	End of season	

== Team ==
=== First-team squad ===
As of 1 February 2021

East Bengal announced their first-team squad on 20 October which included 22 domestic players. They had also signed six foreign players who were registered for the 2020–21 Indian Super League season. The following list consists of the registered players for the Indian Super League season. Danny Fox was announced as the captain of the side while Anthony Pilkington was announced as his deputy.

No.	Name	Nat.	Position(s)	Date of Birth (Age)
Goalkeepers
24	Debjit Majumder	(India)	GK	6 March 1988 (age 38)
32	Mirshad Michu	(India)	GK	3 February 1994 (age 32)
40	Suvam Sen	(India)	GK	14 November 1989 (age 36)
91	Subrata Paul	(India)	GK	24 November 1986 (age 39)
Defenders
2	Scott Neville	(Australia)	CB/RB	11 January 1989 (age 37)
4	Danny Fox (captain)	(Scotland)	CB	29 May 1986 (age 40)
16	Rana Gharami	(India)	CB	6 October 1990 (age 36)
21	Narayan Das	(India)	LB	25 September 1993 (age 33)
27	Lalramchullova	(India)	LB/RB	14 January 1996 (age 30)
31	Rohen Singh	(India)	CB	3 January 2003 (age 23)
47	Raju Gaikwad	(India)	CB/RB	25 September 1990 (age 36)
55	Ankit Mukherjee	(India)	RB	10 July 1996 (age 30)
70	Sarthak Golui	(India)	CB	3 November 1997 (age 29)
Midfielders
6	Matti Steinmann	(Germany)	CDM	8 January 1995 (age 31)
8	Mohammed Rafique	(India)	CM	26 March 1991 (age 35)
14	Wahengbam Angousana	(India)	CM	2 February 1996 (age 30)
17	Yumnam Singh	(India)	LW	1 February 1999 (age 27)
18	Eugeneson Lyngdoh	(India)	CM	10 September 1986 (age 40)
19	Jacques Maghoma	(Democratic Republic of the Congo)	LW/AM	23 October 1987 (age 39)
20	Aaron Amadi-Holloway	(Wales)	MF	1 February 1993 (age 33)
22	Anthony Pilkington (vice-captain)	(Republic of Ireland)	LW/RW/AM	6 June 1988 (age 38)
23	Bikash Jairu	(India)	LW	10 November 1990 (age 36)
26	Sehnaj Singh	(India)	CDM	29 July 1993 (age 33)
29	Surchandra Singh	(India)	RW	5 January 1994 (age 32)
33	Loken Meitei	(India)	LW	4 May 1997 (age 29)
35	Milan Singh	(India)	CDM	15 May 1992 (age 34)
44	Haobam Tomba Singh	(India)	CM	17 February 2003 (age 23)
56	Ajay Chhetri	(India)	CDM	1 July 1999 (age 27)
88	Sourav Das	(India)	CM	20 June 1996 (age 30)
Forwards
10	Bright Enobakhare	(Nigeria)	FW	8 February 1998 (age 28)
12	Jeje Lalpekhlua	(India)	FW	7 January 1991 (age 35)
15	Balwant Singh	(India)	FW	15 December 1986 (age 39)
28	Girik Khosla	(India)	FW	4 January 1995 (age 31)
30	C. K. Vineeth	(India)	FW	20 May 1988 (age 38)
34	Harmanpreet Singh	(India)	FW	2 September 2001 (age 25)

Source: SC East Bengal Squad

==== Other players under contract ====
Some newly contracted players, and players with existing contracts, were not registered in the first team squad. They are:

Name	Nationality	Position	Date of Birth (Age)
Prakash Sarkar	(India)	MF	15 February 1997 (age 29)
Rino Anto	(India)	DF	3 January 1988 (age 38)
Cavin Lobo	(India)	MF	4 April 1988 (age 38)
Keegan Pereira	(India)	DF	7 November 1987 (age 39)
Boithang Haokip	(India)	MF	9 September 1991 (age 35)
Novin Gurung	(India)	DF	28 April 1999 (age 27)
Pritam Kumar Singh	(India)	DF	10 December 1995 (age 30)
Anil Chawan	(India)	DF	27 April 1999 (age 27)
Calum Woods	(England)	DF	5 February 1987 (age 39)

== Coaching staff ==
As of 19 March 2021

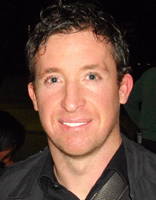
Robbie Fowler, the head coach of East Bengal for this season.

Position	Name
Head coach	(England) Robbie Fowler
Assistant coach	(England) Anthony Grant
Assistant coach	(India) Renedy Singh
Set piece coach	(England) Terry McPhillips
Goalkeeping coach	(England) Bobby Mimms
Physio	(England) Michael Harding
Video analyst	(England) Joseph Walmsley
Sports scientist	(England) Jack Inman
Psychologist	(England) Nicola McCalliog

== Kit ==
East Bengal signed Indian apparel brand TYKA Sports as the new kit sponsors for the 2020–21 season. On 2 November, the club launched all three sets of kits for the 2020–21 season, each one depicting a symbol for the club and Bengal. The home colours are the iconic red and gold and the kit depicts the flames of the Torch or "Mashal", the club's emblem. The away colours are blue and white, depicting the scales of Hilsa or "Ilish", the fish which is associated with the Bangal family. It also shows the rivers and waters that flow between and connect the Eastern and Western parts of Bengal, providing life to the people. The third kit is black with golden stripes, symbolising the Sunderbans and its famous inhabitant, the Royal Bengal Tiger.

Home	Away	Third

== Pre-season ==
East Bengal and coach Robbie Fowler along with his coaching staff arrived at Goa on 16 October for pre-season preparation. Due to the COVID-19 pandemic in India, the team spent 14 days in quarantine in the team's hotel before beginning pre-season training. The first practice session under Fowler began on 30 October 2020, with just four weeks to prepare before the season opener against ATK Mohun Bagan. East Bengal management acquired the Sesa Football Academy ground for the season as their home base for training.

On 10 November, East Bengal faced the Kerala Blasters in their first pre-season practice game and won 3–1 courtesy of a brace from Anthony Pilkington in the first half, which put the Red and Gold brigade 2–0 ahead at half time. In the second half, Gary Hooper pulled one back for the Blasters, but Yumnam Singh scored the third for East Bengal, who won 3–1.

=== Pre-season friendlies ===
Win Draw Loss

10 November 2020 Friendly	East Bengal	3–1	Kerala Blasters	Goa
16:00 IST	Pilkington (pen.); Yumnam	Report	Hooper	Stadium: Peddem Sports Complex

== Competitions ==
=== Overall ===
Competition	First match	Last match	Final Position
Indian Super League	27 November 2020	27 February 2021	9th

=== Overview ===
Competition	Record							
Competition	Pld	W	D	L	GF	GA	GD	Win %
Indian Super League	20	3	8	9	22	33	−11	15.00
Total	20	3	8	9	22	33	−11	15.00

Last updated: 27 February 2021
Source: Competitions

=== Indian Super League ===
==== Summary ====
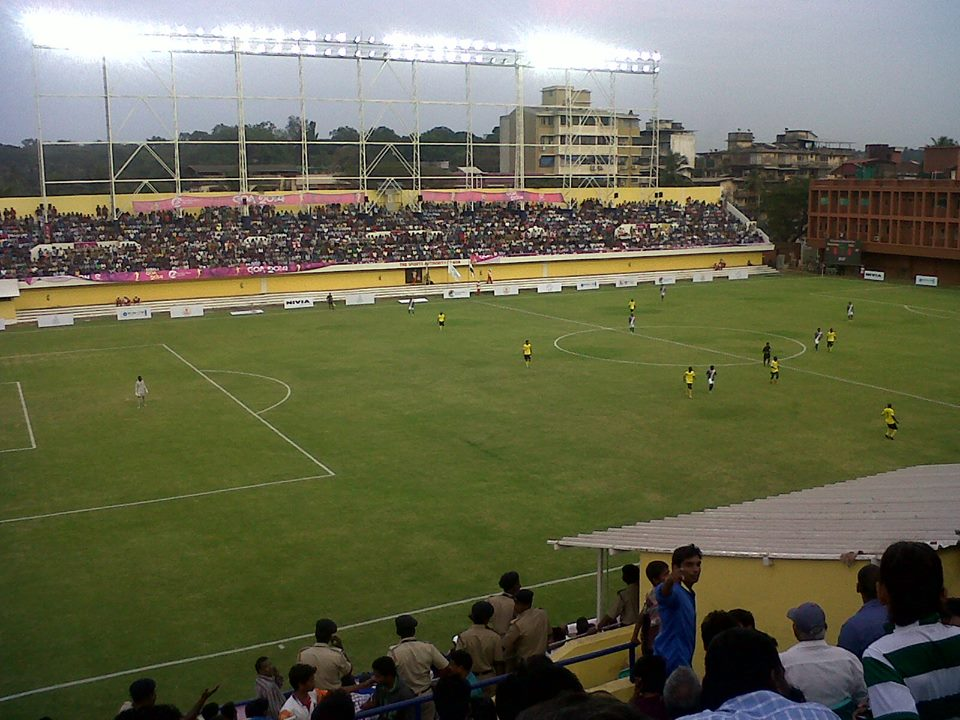
Tilak Maidan Stadium in 2014

East Bengal officially joined the Indian Super League as the 11th team after the FSDL accepted their bid documents. This is the first time the team has played in the ISL. Due to the COVID-19 pandemic, the 2020–21 Indian Super League season was held entirely at Goa under a secured bio-bubble. The club was allotted the Tilak Maidan Stadium as their home ground for the season.

===== November =====
East Bengal made their debut in the Indian Super League on 27 November against their arch-rivals ATK Mohun Bagan at the Tilak Maidan Stadium in Goa. However, the Red and Gold brigade suffered a 0–2 defeat in their opening game courtesy of strikes from Roy Krishna and Manvir Singh for ATK Mohun Bagan.

===== December =====
East Bengal faced Mumbai City in their second game campaign at the GMC Athletic Stadium, Bambolim, on 1 December and were defeated 3–0, with Adam Le Fondre scoring two goals and Hernan Santana scoring the third for the Islanders. East Bengal captain Danny Fox sustained a groin injury in the second minute of the game and had to leave the field. Le Fondre scored the first from a counter-attack in the 20th minute as Hugo Boumous set him up in front of an open net. The second goal came just after the restart from a penalty as Debjit Majumder took down Le Fondre inside the box. The third goal came in the 58th minute from a set-piece movement as Hernan Santana scored unmarked from inside the penalty area.

In the third match, the club faced NorthEast United on 5 December at the Tilak Maidan Stadium and suffered a hat-trick of losses as they went down 2–0. Controversially, the red and gold brigade were denied a penalty early in the first half when Ashutosh Mehta tripped Jacques Maghoma inside the box, with Ashutosh already on a yellow, but referee Santosh Kumar ignored the calls. The opening goal came in the 33rd minute when a cross from the right flank struck Surchandra Singh and went into his net for an own goal. The second goal came in the dying minutes of the game against the run of play from a counter-attack as Rochharzela tapped in from close range to make it 2–0 for the Highlanders—a third consecutive defeat for the East Bengal team, who had yet to score a goal in the campaign.

On 10 December, East Bengal next faced Jamshedpur in their fourth match of the campaign at the Tilak Maidan Stadium. Their first match in the Indian Super League was a hard-fought goalless draw, having played more than 70 minutes with only 10 men. Eugeneson Lyngdoh, who got his first start for East Bengal, was sent off with double bookings in the 25th minute of the game. The 10-man East Bengal team kept a clean sheet at the back, with Mohammed Irshad being awarded Hero of the Match for his excellent defensive display.

East Bengal played Hyderabad FC on 15 December in their fifth game at the Tilak Maidan Stadium and suffered yet another defeat as they went down 3–2. It was Jacques Maghoma who scored the first-ever goal for East Bengal in the Indian Super League in the 26th minute to put them ahead. Hyderabad had a chance to equalise in the dying minutes of the first half as they were awarded a penalty kick, but Debjit Majumder saved Aridane Santana's spot-kick to keep the lead at halftime. Hyderabad rallied back in the second half, however, as Aridane Santana scored two goals within 54 seconds to take the lead in the 56th minute. In the 69th minute, Halicharan Narzary tapped in the third for Hyderabad after Liston Colaco dribbled past the East Bengal defence to square it to him for the finish and take a two-goal lead. Jacques Maghoma did score another with a glancing header off Anthony Pilkington's set-piece in the 81st minute, but it was not enough as East Bengal suffered their fourth loss in five matches.

East Bengal announced their eighth foreign signing for the season. English defender Calum Woods joined the side in Goa. However, he was not registered into the ISL squad immediately but kept as a backup option. The club faced Kerala Blasters next on 20 December at the GMC Stadium, Bambolim, and shared points after Kerala Blasters scored in the dying minutes to make it 1–1. East Bengal took the lead in the 13th minute after Mohammed Rafique's low grounder went inside the net, having been deflected off Kerala Blasters' defender Bakary Kone as an own goal. East Bengal had a few more chances to bury the game but failed to utilise them. Kerala Blasters equalised in the 95th minute of the game, with Jeakson Singh scoring a header from inside the box. The red and gold brigade moved up a place to 10th after earning a single point from the game.

On 26 December, East Bengal faced Chennaiyin at the Tilak Maidan Stadium and came from behind twice to draw 2–2 courtesy of a brace from German midfielder Matti Steinmann. Chennaiyin FC took the lead early in the 13th minute after Lallianzuala Chhangte scored from a fast counter-movement. East Bengal equalised in the second half in the 59th minute as Matti headed in from a corner-kick by Bikash Jairu. Chennaiyin FC once again took the lead just five minutes later in the 64th minute, with Rahim Ali finishing from close range to make it 2–1. However, once again, Matti Steinmann tapped home a rebound from Danny Fox's header from another corner by Bikash Jairu in the 68th minute. East Bengal remained win-less after seven matches in the Indian Super League with just three points.

===== January =====
On 1 January, East Bengal announced the signing of 22-year-old Nigerian U-23 forward Bright Enobakhare, who last played for the Greek side AEK Athens. On 2 January, the team announced the double signing of Indian defenders Ankit Mukherjee from ATK Mohun Bagan and Raju Gaikwad, who played for Kerala Blasters last season. Jaime Santos, the only foreigner from the previous season with long term contract was released and he joined Palmaflor in January. Lalrindika Ralte was not registered for the ISL squad and in joined I-League side, Real Kashmir after being released from the club.

The first game of 2021 was against Odisha, on 3 January at the Tilak Maidan Stadium and grabbed their first win of the campaign with a score of 3–1. Anthony Pilkington opened the scoring for East Bengal in the 12th minute as he headed in from a long throw-in by Raju Gaikwad. Jacques Maghoma doubled the lead in the 39th minute with a left-footed finish as he scored his third goal of the season. In the second half, debutant Bright Enobakhare scored the third in the 88th minute to seal the victory for the red and gold brigade. An own goal by Danny Fox was a consolation for Odisha in the 92nd minute and East Bengal got all three points for the first time in the season.

The team faced Goa at the Fatorda Stadium on 6 January and shared points with a 1–1 draw, even after playing with 10 men for more than 40 minutes in the second half. East Bengal had the better chances in the game, but Danny Fox and Matti Steinmann failed to convert the opportunities. Fox was given a straight red card in the 56th minute for dangerous play, but again it was the red and gold brigade who created more chances. In the 79th minute, Nigerian forward Bright Enobakhare, who had his first start for the team, scored a goal after dribbling past five Goa players to finish the ball and put East Bengal ahead. However, Goa equalised the score a minute later with a Devendra Murgaonkar header. Bright Enobakhare put the ball inside the net once more, but it was ruled off for a foul. East Bengal managed to hold the Goans for the final minutes and shared points. They remain unbeaten in their last four matches with seven points on the table from nine games.

East Bengal played Bengaluru on 9 January at the Fatorda Stadium in their last game of the first leg of the 2020–21 ISL and secured their second win of the campaign by a 1–0 margin. East Bengal had the red card decision on Danny Fox overturned by the disciplinary committee and EB captain started the game. The solitary strike came in the 20th minute as Matti Steinmann flicked in Narayan Das's low cross from close range. East Bengal remained unbeaten in five matches with this win and reached 10 points from as many games played.

On 11 January, East Bengal signed United's goalkeeper Suvam Sen as a replacement for Rafique Ali Sardar, who went on loan to Mohammedan Sporting. The team also announced the signing of the defensive midfielder Ajay Chhetri from Bengaluru on loan for the rest of the season.

The team played Kerala Blasters in the return fixture at the Tilak Maidan Stadium on 15 January and scored a last-minute equaliser to earn a 1–1 draw. Raju Gaikwad was injured during the warm-up and had to be replaced by Rana Gharami. The first half remained goalless, but it was Kerala Blasters who took the lead in the 56th minute as Jordan Murray scored past Debjit following a long ball from goalkeeper Albino Gomes. East Bengal found the equaliser in the dying moments at the 94th minute when Scott Neville headed into the net from Bright Enobakhare's corner kick. East Bengal managed to keep their undefeated run alive and grab a point from the game.

The club played Chennaiyin on 18 January at the GMC Stadium and managed to keep their unbeaten run ongoing with a 0–0 draw even after going down to 10 men in the 30th minute. Ajay Chhetri, who got his first start for the team, was given red card right after the half-hour mark after a double booking. East Bengal still managed to hold on with Hero of the Match Debjit Majumder making some vital saves late in the second half as East Bengal grabbed a point and remained undefeated in seven matches in a row.

Two players from the previous season, Samad Ali Mallick and Abhishek Ambekar and new recruit Mohammed Irshad were de-registered and parted ways from the club. Samad Ali Mallick and Mohammed Irshad joined Punjab; Abhishek Ambekar joined the new I-League entrants, Sudeva Delhi. Brandon Vanlalremdika was loaned out to another I-League club, Aizawl.

The team played table-toppers Mumbai City on 22 January next at the Tilak Maidan Stadium and in a tightly contested game, succumbed to a 0–1 defeat courtesy of a solitary goal from Mumbai defender Mourtada Fall in the 27th minute. The red and gold brigade went all out in the second half as Danny Fox came close to equalising the score but failed. East Bengal's seven-match undefeated streak came to an end with this defeat.

On 26 January, East Bengal announced the signing of veteran goalkeeper Subrata Paul on loan from Hyderabad. The deal was a swap loan deal with Sankar Roy joining Hyderabad until the end of the season on loan.

East Bengal played FC Goa on 29 January at the Fatorda Stadium and managed to secure another 1–1 draw after trailing in the first half. Igor Angulo put Goa ahead in the 39th minute after Anthony Pilkington squandered a spot-kick early in the second minute of the game. Skipper Danny Fox equalised for East Bengal in the 65th minute from a set-piece movement. Goa was down to 10-men in the 66th minute after Edu Bedia was showrn red card for double booking, but East Bengal failed to capitalise on the opportunity and shared the points with yet another draw.

===== February =====
On 1 February, transfer deadline day, East Bengal announced the double signing of defender Sarthak Golui and midfielder Sourav Das from Mumbai City. Next day, East Bengal played Bengaluru at the Tilak Maidan Stadium and suffered a 0–2 defeat. Brazilian forward Cleiton Silva put Bengaluru ahead in the 12th minute with a left-footed finish. The blues doubled their lead in the 45th minute when Parag Shrivas hit the ball onto the sidebar, only to rebound and struck Debjit Majumder's legs to go in for an own goal. Bengaluru could have increased their lead in the second half as Sunil Chhetri hit the crossbar. This was the sixth defeat of the season for East Bengal, as they remained on 13 points from 15 matches.

Coach Robbie Fowler was handed a four-match ban and a fine by the tournament committee for making alleged "insulting remarks" about match officials of the Goa game in a post-match interview.

East Bengal faced Jamshedpur on 7 February at the Fatorda Stadium and won 2–1. Matti Steinmann put East Bengal ahead in the 65th minute with a header off a Narayan Das's corner. Anthony Pilkington doubled the lead in the 68th minute with a shot after Steinmann played him inside the box. Peter Hartley pulled one back for Jamshedpur in the 83rd minute, but the Red and Gold brigade managed to hold on to the lead and grab their third win of the campaign and move to ninth place.

On 12 February, EB faced Hyderabad at the Tilak Maidan Stadium and drew 1–1 to share points. Bright Enobakhare put East Bengal ahead in the 59th minute after being played through by Anthony Pilkington with a headed flick. Aridane Santana equalised for Hyderabad in injury time to deny East Bengal all three points. Bright Enobakhare had a genuine spor-kick turned down after being taken down by Laxmikant Kattimani inside the box. With eight draws and three wins, The team remained in ninth place with 17 points.

On 19 February, in the return leg of the Kolkata Derby and the team suffered another defeat as the game ended 3–1. Roy Krishna put ATK Mohun Bagan ahead in the 15th minute with a solo finish grabbing onto a long ball from Tiri. East Bengal equalised in the 41st minute as Tiri headed inside his net for an own goal from a Raju Gaikwad's long throw. In the second half, David Williams put ATK Mohun Bagan ahead again following an error by East Bengal skipper Danny Fox in the 72nd minute. Substitute Javi Hernandez doubled their lead in the 89th minute with a header as they secured a victory.

The club faced NorthEast United next on 23 February in their penultimate game of the season and suffered another defeat as the game ended 2–1 in favour of the Highlander brigade. V.P. Suhair scored the opening goal for NorthEast United in the 48th minute before Sarthak Golui put the ball inside his net for an own goal in the 55th minute and NorthEast United doubled their lead. Sarthak Golui scored the consolation for the Red and Gold brigade in the 87th minute from a header of a dead-ball situation, however, it was not enough to save a defeat.

In the last game of the season, East Bengal played Odisha and suffered their ninth defeat of the season in a high-scoring encounter which ended 6–5 for Odisha. Paul Ramfangzauva and Jerry Mawihmingthanga scored a brace while Lalhrezuala Sailung and Diego Maurício scored one each of Odisha's six goals while Aaron Amadi-Holloway netted twice with Anthony Pilkington and Jeje Lalpekhlua finding the back of the net along with an own goal from Ravi Kumar as EB ended their season with an all-time low, letting in six goals for the second time in domestic competition since independence. The match became the highest scoring match in league history. East Bengal ended their ISL inaugural campaign with 17 points finishing in ninth place.

After the last match of the season, Fowler stated, "The planning has already started. As soon as the season ends, we automatically start planning for the next season. We just did not have enough time this year in terms of preparation. With the right recruitment and the right time frame on the training pitches, and with my ideas and methods of the way we want to play, we can do better."

==== League table ====
Pos	Team	Pld	W	D	L	GF	GA	GD	Pts
7	Bengaluru	20	5	7	8	26	28	−2	22
8	Chennaiyin	20	3	11	6	17	23	−6	20
9	East Bengal	20	3	8	9	22	33	−11	17
10	Kerala Blasters	20	3	8	9	23	36	−13	17
11	Odisha	20	2	6	12	25	44	−19	12

Source: Indian Super League
Rules for classification: 1) points; 2) head-to-head points; 3) head-to-head goal difference; 4) head-to-head goals scored; 5) goal difference; 6) number of goals scored; 7) fair play ranking; 8) drawing of lots

==== Result summary ====
Overall								Home						Away					
Pld	W	D	L	GF	GA	GD	Pts	W	D	L	GF	GA	GD	W	D	L	GF	GA	GD
20	3	8	9	22	33	−11	17	1	5	3	9	12	−3	2	3	6	13	21	−8

Last updated: 27 February 2021.
Source: indiansuperleague.com

==== Results by round ====
Round	1	2	3	4	5	6	7	8	9	10	11	12	13	14	15	16	17	18	19	20
Ground	H	A	A	H	A	A	H	H	H	A	H	A	H	A	H	A	H	A	H	A
Result	L	L	L	D	L	D	D	W	D	W	D	D	L	D	L	W	D	L	L	L
Position	11	11	11	11	11	10	10	10	9	9	9	9	10	10	10	9	9	9	9	9

Updated to match(es) played on 27 February 2021. Source: indiansuperleague.com
A = Away; H = Home; W = Win; D = Draw; L = Loss

==== Matches ====
The season fixtures for the first 10 matches (Note: The rest of the fixtures were announced after the AFC competitions' calendar was published.) were released on 30 October. East Bengal began their campaign against rivals ATK Mohun Bagan on 27 November 2020. The rest of the fixtures were announced on 2 January 2021.

Win Draw Loss Void Postponed

27 November 2020^{(KD)} 1	East Bengal	0–2	ATK Mohun Bagan	Vasco da Gama, Goa
19:30 IST	Balwant (yellow card) 22'; Maghoma (yellow card) 53'; Narayan (yellow card) 72'	Report	Rane (yellow card) 45'; Krishna 49'; Kotal (yellow card) 70'; Manvir 85'	Stadium: Tilak Maidan Stadium; Attendance: 0 Referee: C. R. Srikrishna; Man of the Match: Carl McHugh (ATK Mohun Bagan)

1 December 2020 2	Mumbai City	3–0	East Bengal	Bambolim, Goa
19:30 IST	Rakip (yellow card) 10'; Le Fondre 20', 48' (pen.); Borges (yellow card) 36'; Fall (yellow card) 44'; Jahouh (yellow card) 53'; Santana 58'; Rao Dessai (yellow card) 62'	Report	Angousana (yellow card) 58'; Rafique (yellow card) 90'	Stadium: GMC Athletic Stadium; Attendance: 0 Referee: Tejas Nagvenkar; Man of the Match: Hugo Boumous (Mumbai City)

5 December 2020 3	NorthEast United	2–0	East Bengal	Vasco da Gama, Goa
19:30 IST	Mehta (yellow card) 2'; Surchandra 33' (o.g.); Rochharzela 90'	Report	Lyngdoh (yellow card) 84'; Sehnaj (yellow card) 89'	Stadium: Tilak Maidan Stadium; Attendance: 0 Referee: Santosh Kumar; Man of the Match: Benjamin Lambot (NorthEast United)

10 December 2020 4	East Bengal	0–0	Jamshedpur	Vasco da Gama, Goa
19:30 IST	Lyngdoh (yellow card) 21' (yellow-red card) 25'; Rafique (yellow card) 79'; Angousana (yellow card) 83'	Report	Jadhav (yellow card) 10'; Renthlei (yellow card) 58' (yellow-red card) 90'; Monroy (yellow card) 90'	Stadium: Tilak Maidan Stadium; Attendance: 0 Referee: Rahul Kumar Gupta; Man of the Match: Mohamed Irshad (East Bengal)

15 December 2020 5	Hyderabad	3–2	East Bengal	Vasco da Gama, Goa
19:30 IST	Aridane 56', 56'; Narzary 68'	Report	Maghoma 26', 81'; Irshad (yellow card) 49'; Steinmann (yellow card) 74'; Ambekar (yellow card) 83'; Das (yellow card) 90'; Holloway (yellow card) 90'	Stadium: Tilak Maidan Stadium; Attendance: 0 Referee: Ajit Kumar Meitei; Man of the Match: Aridane Santana (Hyderabad)

20 December 2020 6	Kerala Blasters	1–1	East Bengal	Bambolim, Goa
19:30 IST	Praveen (yellow card) 13'; Koné (yellow card) 58'; Jeakson 90'	Report	Koné 13' (o.g.); Haobam (yellow card) 35'; Surchandra (yellow card) 72'; Fox (yellow card) 83'; Neville (yellow card) 90'	Stadium: GMC Athletic Stadium; Attendance: 0 Referee: Tejas Nagvenkar; Man of the Match: Anthony Pilkington (East Bengal)

26 December 2020 7	East Bengal	2–2	Chennaiyin	Vasco da Gama, Goa
19:30 IST	Steinmann 59', 68'; Maghoma (yellow card) 90'	Report	Chhangte 13'; Ali 64'	Stadium: Tilak Maidan Stadium; Attendance: 0 Referee: Harish Kundu; Man of the Match: Matti Steinmann (East Bengal)

3 January 2021 8	East Bengal	3–1	Odisha	Vasco da Gama, Goa
17:00 IST	Milan (yellow card) 3'; Pilkington 12'; Maghoma 39'; Enobakhare 88'	Report	Sarangi (yellow card) 82'; Fox 90' (o.g.)	Stadium: Tilak Maidan Stadium; Attendance: 0 Referee: Crystal John; Man of the Match: Anthony Pilkington (East Bengal)

6 January 2021 9	East Bengal	1–1	Goa	Vasco da Gama, Goa
19:30 IST	Gaikwad (yellow card) 31'; Mukherjee (yellow card) 54'; Fox (red card) 56'; Holloway (yellow card) 67'; Maghoma (yellow card) 73'; Enobakhare 79'; Neville (yellow card) 90'	Report	Fernandes (yellow card) 45'; Murgaonkar 81'; Noguera (yellow card) 82'	Stadium: Tilak Maidan Stadium; Attendance: 0 Referee: Rowan Arumughan; Man of the Match: Bright Enobakhare (East Bengal)

9 January 2021 10	Bengaluru	0–1	East Bengal	Margao, Goa
19:30 IST	Ajith (yellow card) 20'; Delgado (yellow card) 21'; Paartalu (yellow card) 40'	Report	Steinmann 20'	Stadium: Fatorda Stadium; Attendance: 0 Referee: Harish Kundu; Man of the Match: Debjit Majumder (East Bengal)

15 January 2021 11	East Bengal	1–1	Kerala Blasters	Vasco da Gama, Goa
19:30 IST	Milan (yellow card) 34'; Neville 90'	Report	Jeakson (yellow card) 4'; Murray 64'	Stadium: Tilak Maidan Stadium; Attendance: 0 Referee: Harish Kundu; Man of the Match: Sahal Abdul Samad (Kerala Blasters)

18 January 2021 12	Chennaiyin	0–0	East Bengal	Bambolim, Goa
19:30 IST	Sabia (yellow card) 56'; Sylvestr (yellow card) 86'	Report	Chhetri (yellow card) 22' (yellow-red card) 31'; Narayan (yellow card) 89'	Stadium: GMC Athletic Stadium; Attendance: 0 Referee: Rahul Kumar Gupta; Man of the Match: Debjit Majumder (East bengal)

22 January 2021 13	East Bengal	0–1	Mumbai City	Vasco da Gama, Goa
19:30 IST	Fox (yellow card) 5'	Report	Jahouh (yellow card) 23'; Fall 27'; Boumous (yellow card) 73'; Dessai (yellow card) 75'; Ogbeche (yellow card) 67'	Stadium: Tilak Maidan Stadium; Attendance: 0 Referee: C. R. Srikrishna; Man of the Match: Mourtada Fall (Mumbai City)

29 January 2021 14	Goa	1–1	East Bengal	Margao, Goa
19:30 IST	Angulo 39'; Bedia (yellow card) 64' (yellow-red card) 66'; Gama (yellow card) 60'	Report	Pilkington (penalty missed) 2'; Fox 65' (yellow card) 90'; Neville (yellow card) 74'	Stadium: Fatorda Stadium; Attendance: 0 Referee: Harish Kundu; Man of the Match: Bright Enobakhare (East Bengal)

2 February 2021 15	East Bengal	0–2	Bengaluru	Vasco da Gama, Goa
19:30 IST	Pilkington (yellow card) 90'	Report	Silva 12' (yellow card) 65'; Majumder 45' (o.g.); Bheke (yellow card) 90'	Stadium: Tilak Maidan Stadium; Attendance: 0 Referee: C. R. Srikrishna; Man of the Match: Sunil Chhetri (Bengaluru)

7 February 2021 16	Jamshedpur	1–2	East Bengal	Margao, Goa
17:00 IST	Hartley 83' (yellow card) 90'; Valskis (yellow card) 90'	Report	Steinmann 6'; Pilkington 68'	Stadium: Fatorda Stadium; Attendance: 0 Referee: Crystal John; Man of the Match: Matti Steinmann (East Bengal)

12 February 2021 17	East Bengal	1–1	Hyderabad	Vasco da Gama, Goa
19:30 IST	Gaikwad (yellow card) 56'; Enobakhare 59'; Paul (yellow card) 89'	Report	Victor (yellow card) 54'; Santana 90'; Yasir (red card) 90'	Stadium: Tilak Maidan Stadium; Attendance: 0 Referee: Ajit Kumar Meitei; Man of the Match: Akash Mishra (Hyderabad)

19 February 2021^{(KD)} 18	ATK Mohun Bagan	3–1	East Bengal	Margao, Goa
19:30 IST	Krishna 15'; McHugh (yellow card) 30'; Jhingan (yellow card) 64'; Williams 72' (yellow card) 88'; Hernandez 89'	Report	Enobakhare (yellow card) 18'; Tiri 41' (o.g.); Pilkington (yellow card) 62'; Maghoma (yellow card) 68'; Mukherjee (yellow card) 90'; Fox (yellow card) 90'	Stadium: Fatorda Stadium; Attendance: 0 Referee: Tejas Nagvenkar; Man of the Match: Roy Krishna (ATK Mohun Bagan)

23 February 2021 19	East Bengal	1–2	NorthEast United	Margao, Goa
19:30 IST	Gaikwad (yellow card) 45' (yellow-red card) 71'; Neville (yellow card) 45'; Rafique (yellow card) 69'; Mukherjee (yellow card) 84'; Golui 87'	Report	Suhair 48'; Golui 55' (o.g.)	Stadium: Fatorda Stadium; Attendance: 0 Referee: Rahul Kumar Gupta; Man of the Match: V.P. Suhair (NorthEast United)

27 February 2021 20	Odisha	6–5	East Bengal	Bambolim, Goa
17:30 IST	Sailung 33'; Ramfangzauva 49' 66'; Jerry 51' (yellow card) 63' (goal) 67'; Rai (yellow card) 57'; Mauricio 69'	Report	Pilkington 24' (yellow card) 45'; Ravi 37' (o.g.); Fox (yellow card) 51'; Holloway 60' 90'; Lalpekhlua 74'	Stadium: GMC Athletic Stadium; Attendance: 0 Referee: Harish Kundu; Man of the Match: Diego Mauricio (Odisha)
Note: This match became the highest scoring match in ISL history

== Statistics ==
=== Appearances ===
Players with no appearances not included in the list.

As of match played on 27 February 2021

Appearances for East Bengal in 2020–21 season
No.	Pos.	Nat.	Name	Indian Super League		Total	
No.	Pos.	Nat.	Name	Apps	Starts	Apps	Starts
Goalkeepers
~~1~~	GK	(India)	Sankar Roy (Note: De-registered from the squad in January)	1	1	1	1
24	GK	(India)	Debjit Majumder	15	14	15	14
32	GK	(India)	Mirshad Michu	1	1	1	1
91	GK	(India)	Subrata Paul	4	4	4	4
Defenders
2	CB	(Australia)	Scott Neville	16	16	16	16
4	CB	(Scotland)	Danny Fox	16	16	16	16
16	CB	(India)	Rana Gharami	7	4	7	4
21	LB	(India)	Narayan Das	17	16	17	16
~~37~~	LB	(India)	Abhishek Ambekar	4	0	4	0
31	RB	(India)	Rohen Singh	1	0	1	0
47	RB	(India)	Raju Gaikwad	7	7	7	7
55	RB	(India)	Ankit Mukherjee	12	9	12	9
~~66~~	CB	(India)	Mohammed Irshad	4	4	4	4
70	CB	(India)	Sarthak Golui	5	5	5	5
Midfielders
6	CM	(Germany)	Matti Steinmann	17	17	17	17
8	CM	(India)	Mohammed Rafique	15	7	15	7
14	CM	(India)	Wahengbam Angousana	12	4	12	4
17	MF	(India)	Yumnam Singh	4	0	4	0
18	CM	(India)	Eugeneson Lyngdoh	2	1	2	1
19	AM	(Democratic Republic of the Congo)	Jacques Maghoma	19	17	19	17
20	MF	(Wales)	Aaron Amadi-Holloway	13	4	13	4
22	AM	(Republic of Ireland)	Anthony Pilkington	17	15	17	15
23	LW	(India)	Bikash Jairu	4	4	4	4
26	CDM	(India)	Sehnaj Singh	6	5	6	5
29	RW	(India)	Surchandra Singh	13	8	13	8
33	CM	(India)	Loken Meitei	1	1	1	1
35	CDM	(India)	Milan Singh	8	6	8	6
44	CM	(India)	Haobam Singh	4	4	4	4
56	MF	(India)	Ajay Chhetri	5	4	5	4
88	CM	(India)	Sourav Das	3	3	3	3
Forwards
10	FW	(Nigeria)	Bright Enobakhare	12	10	12	10
12	FW	(India)	Jeje Lalpekhlua	7	4	7	4
15	FW	(India)	Balwant Singh	3	3	3	3
30	FW	(India)	C. K. Vineeth	2	1	2	1
34	FW	(India)	Harmanpreet Singh	7	5	7	5

=== Goal scorers ===
As of matches played till 27 February 2021

Rank	No.	Pos.	Nat.	Name	ISL	Total
1	6	CM	(Germany)	Matti Steinmann	4	4
2	10	FW	(Nigeria)	Bright Enobakhare	3	3
2	19	AM	(Democratic Republic of the Congo)	Jacques Maghoma	3	3
2	22	AM	(Republic of Ireland)	Anthony Pilkington	3	3
5	20	MF	(Wales)	Aaron Amadi-Holloway	2	2
6	2	CB	(Australia)	Scott Neville	1	1
6	4	CB	(Scotland)	Danny Fox	1	1
6	12	FW	(India)	Jeje Lalpekhlua	1	1
6	70	CB	(India)	Sarthak Golui	1	1
				Own Goal	3	3
Total					22	22

=== Assists ===
As of match played on 27 February 2021

Rank	No.	Pos.	Nat.	Name	ISL	Total
1	6	CM	(Germany)	Matti Steinmann	3	3
1	22	AM	(Republic of Ireland)	Anthony Pilkington	3	3
3	29	RW	(India)	Surchandra Singh	2	2
3	4	CB	(Scotland)	Danny Fox	2	2
5	10	FW	(Nigeria)	Bright Enobakhare	1	1
5	14	CM	(India)	Wahengbam Angousana	1	1
5	19	AM	(Democratic Republic of the Congo)	Jacques Maghoma	1	1
5	21	LB	(India)	Narayan Das	1	1
5	23	LB	(India)	Bikash Jairu	1	1
5	27	FW	(India)	Jeje Lalpekhlua	1	1
5	47	RB	(India)	Raju Gaikwad	1	1
Total					17	17

=== Clean sheets ===
As of match played on 27 February 2021

No.	Nat.	Player	ISL	Total
24	(India)	Debjit Majumder	2	2
~~1~~	(India)	Sankar Roy	1	1
Total			3	3

=== Disciplinary record ===
As of match played on 27 February 2021

No.	Pos.	Nat.	Name	Indian Super League				Remarks
No.	Pos.	Nat.	Name	Yellow card	(yellow card) (red card)	(yellow card) (yellow-red card)	Red card	Remarks
2	CB	(Australia)	Scott Neville	4	0	0	0	Missed the game against Odisha (4 yellow cards) on 27 February 2021
4	CB	(Scotland)	Danny Fox	5	0	0	1	Red card overturned later after appeal. Missed the game against NorthEast United (4 yellow cards) on 23 February 2021
6	CM	(Germany)	Matti Steinmann	1	0	0	0	
8	CM	(India)	Mohammed Rafique	3	0	0	0	
10	FW	(Nigeria)	Bright Enobakhare	1	0	0	0	
14	CM	(India)	Wahengbam Angousana	2	0	0	0	
15	FW	(India)	Balwant Singh	1	0	0	0	
18	CM	(India)	Eugeneson Lyngdoh	1	0	1	0	Missed the game against Hyderabad (red card) on 15 December 2020.
19	AM	(Democratic Republic of the Congo)	Jacques Maghoma	4	0	0	0	Missed the game against NorthEast United (4 yellow cards) on 23 February 2021
20	FW	(Wales)	Aaron Amadi-Holloway	2	0	0	0	
21	LB	(India)	Narayan Das	3	0	0	0	
22	AM	(Republic of Ireland)	Anthony Pilkington	3	0	0	0	
26	CDM	(India)	Sehnaj Singh	1	0	0	0	
29	RW	(India)	Surchandra Singh	1	0	0	0	
35	CDM	(India)	Milan Singh	2	0	0	0	
~~37~~	LB	(India)	Abhishek Ambekar	1	0	0	0	
44	MF	(India)	Haobam Singh	1	0	0	0	
47	RB	(India)	Raju Gaikwad	2	0	1	0	Missed the game against Odisha (red card) on 27 February 2021
55	RB	(India)	Ankit Mukherjee	3	0	0	0	
56	MF	(India)	Ajay Chhetri	0	0	1	0	Missed the game against Mumbai City (red card) on 22 January 2021.
66	CB	(India)	Mohammed Irshad	1	0	0	0	
91	GK	(India)	Subrata Paul	1	0	0	0	

== Club awards ==
=== ISL Fans' Goal of the Week award ===
This is awarded weekly to the player chosen by fans voting at the Indian Super League website.

Week	Nat.	Player	% Votes	Ref
Week 9	(Democratic Republic of the Congo)	Jacques Maghoma	46.2%	
Week 10	(Nigeria)	Bright Enobakhare	79.9%	
Week 11	(Germany)	Matti Steinmann	48.8%	
Week 12	(Australia)	Scott Neville	55.5%	
Week 17	(Republic of Ireland)	Anthony Pilkington	65.3%	
Week 19	(Nigeria)	Bright Enobakhare	55.8%	

== See also ==
- 2020–21 in Indian football
