= Jakob Vanlalhlimpuia =

Indian footballer

Personal information
- Date of birth: 7 March 1999 (age 27)
- Place of birth: Hnahthial, Mizoram, India
- Height: 1.83 m (6 ft 0 in)
- Position: Winger

Team information
- Current team: Diamond Harbour
- Number: 70

Youth career
- Shillong Lajong U18

Senior career*
Years	Team	Apps	(Gls)
2017	Chanmari		
2017–2019	Pune City	4	(0)
2017–2018	Pune City B	8	(2)
2019–2021	Hyderabad B	6	(0)
2021	Corbett	4	(0)
2021–2023	Aizawl	15	(0)
2023–	Diamond Harbour	4	(0)

International career
- India under-17
- * Club domestic league appearances and goals as of 15:35, 18 July 2023 (UTC)

Jakob Vanlalhlimpuia (born 7 March 1999) is an Indian professional footballer who plays as a winger for Calcutta Football League club Diamond Harbour.

== Career ==
Born in Hnahthial, Vanlalhlimpuia started his career playing for Venglai Sports Club in his native state of Mizoram. After spending some time at the club, he was part of the India national under-17 football team Camp. Later, he joined the Shillong Lajong Academy before signing for Mizoram Premier League side, Chanmari.

In the summer of 2018, Vanlalhlimpuia signed for Pune City of the Indian Super League. He made his competitive debut for the club during their opening game of the season on 3 October 2018 against Delhi Dynamos. He started and played 69 minutes as Pune City drew the match 1–1.

== Career statistics ==
=== Club ===
As of 21 February 2023

Club	Season	League			National Cup		League Cup		AFC		Total	
Club	Season	Division	Apps	Goals	Apps	Goals	Apps	Goals	Apps	Goals	Apps	Goals
Pune City	2018–19	Indian Super League	4	0	–		–		–		4	0
Pune City B	2017–18	I-League 2	8	2	–		–		–		8	2
Hyderabad B	2019–20	I-League 2	6	0	–		–		–		6	0
Corbett	2020–21	I-League 2	4	0	–		–		–		4	0
Aizawl	2021–22	I-League	5	0	–		–		–		5	0
Aizawl	2022–23	I-League	10	0	0	0	–		–		10	0
Aizawl	Total		15	0	0	0	0	0	0	0	15	0
Career total			37	2	0	0	0	0	0	0	37	2
