= Harmanpreet =

Harmanpreet is a given name. Notable people with the name include:

- Harmanpreet Kaur (born 1989), Indian cricketer
- Harmanpreet Singh (born 1996), Indian field hockey player
- Harmanpreet Singh (footballer) (born 2001), Indian footballer
