= Gopi Singh Yumnam =

Indian footballer (born 1999)

Gopi Singh
Personal information
- Full name: Gopi Singh Yumnam
- Date of birth: 1 February 1999 (age 27)
- Place of birth: Wangjing, Manipur, India
- Positions: Midfielder; winger

Team information
- Current team: NEROCA
- Number: 28

Senior career*
Years	Team	Apps	(Gls)
2017–2018	NEROCA	15	(0)
2018–2020	ATK B	18	(6)
2020	Bhawanipore	3	(0)
2020–2021	East Bengal	4	(0)
2021	Bengaluru United	3	(0)
2021–2023	Mohammedan	0	(0)
2023–	NEROCA	7	(1)
- * Club domestic league appearances and goals as of 21:45, 23 February 2023 (UTC)

Gopi Singh Yumnam (Meitei: Yumnam Gopi Singh, born 1 February 1999) is an Indian professional footballer who plays as a midfielder or winger for NEROCA in the I-League.

== Career ==
Born to a Hindu Meitei family in Manipur, Singh began his career with local side NEROCA in the I-League. He made his professional debut for the club on 1 December 2017 against Minerva Punjab. He started and played 50 minutes as NEROCA lost 2–1.

On 25 May 2018, Singh signed with ATK of the Indian Super League. Mid-way through the season, Singh was replaced in the senior squad by Ashish Pradhan. Singh then appeared for ATK Reserves as captain in their opening I-League 2nd Division match against Mohammedan. He then scored his first goal of the season for ATK Reserves on 23 January 2019 against Jamshedpur Reserves. His 42nd-minute goal was the second in a 2–0 victory.

== Career statistics ==
=== Club ===
As of 23 February 2023

Club	Season	League			Cup		AFC		Total	
Club	Season	Division	Apps	Goals	Apps	Goals	Apps	Goals	Apps	Goals
NEROCA	2017–18	I-League	15	0	0	0	—		15	0
ATK B	2018–19	I-League 2nd Division	10	5	0	0	—		10	5
ATK	2019–20	Indian Super League	0	0	2 (Note: Appearances in Durand Cup)	0	—		2	0
ATK B	2020	I-League 2nd Division	8	1	0	0	—		8	1
Bhawanipore	2020	I-League 2nd Division	3	0	0	0	—		3	0
East Bengal	2020–21	Indian Super League	4	0	0	0	—		4	0
Bengaluru United	2021	I-League 2nd Division	3	0	4	2	—		7	2
Mohammedan	2021–22	I-League	0	0	0	0	—		0	0
Mohammedan	2022–23	I-League	0	0	4	0	—		4	0
Mohammedan	Mohammedan total		0	0	4	0	0	0	4	0
NEROCA	2022–23	I-League	7	1	0	0	—		7	1
Career total			50	7	10	2	0	0	60	9
