= Angousana Wahengbam =

Indian footballer

Personal information
- Full name: Angousana Luwang Wahengbam
- Date of birth: 2 February 1996 (age 30)
- Place of birth: Imphal, Manipur, India
- Height: 1.75 m (5 ft 9 in)
- Position: Midfielder

Team information
- Current team: Churchill Brothers
- Number: 6

Youth career
- Sagolband United

Senior career*
Years	Team	Apps	(Gls)
2017–2020	TRAU	29	(1)
2020–2023	East Bengal	29	(0)
2023	East Bengal B	6	(2)
2023–2025	Mohammedan	30	(1)
2025–2026	Diamond Harbour	2	(0)
2026–	Churchill Brothers	4	(0)
- * Club domestic league appearances and goals as of 5 November 2026

Angousana Luwang Wahengbam (Meitei: Wahengbam Angousana Luwang, born 2 February 1996) is an Indian professional footballer who plays as a midfielder for Indian Super League club Churchill Brothers.

== Career ==
Born in Imphal, Wahengbam Luwang began his professional career playing for the TRAU F.C. in 2017–18 I-League 2nd Division. He joined TRAU from Shillong Lajong academy and made his professional I-League debut on 1 December 2019 against Chennai City in a 1–0 defeat away from home, where he played as a left-back.

=== East Bengal ===
In 2020, Angousana signed for Kolkata giants SC East Bengal and was announced to be a part of their squad in the 2020–21 Indian Super League.

== Career statistics ==
=== Club ===
As of 24 April 2025

Club	Season	League			Cup		Others		AFC		Total	
Club	Season	Division	Apps	Goals	Apps	Goals	Apps	Goals	Apps	Goals	Apps	Goals
TRAU	2017–18	I-League 2nd Division	12	1	0	0	—		—		12	1
TRAU	2019–20	I-League	17	0	3 (Note: Appearance(s) in Durand Cup)	0	—		—		20	0
TRAU	Total		29	1	3	0	0	0	0	0	32	1
East Bengal	2020–21	Indian Super League	12	0	0	0	—		—		12	0
East Bengal	2021–22	Indian Super League	16	0	0	0	—		—		16	0
East Bengal	2022–23	Indian Super League	1	0	2	0	3 (Note: Appearance(s) in Calcutta Football League)	0	—		6	0
East Bengal	Total		29	0	2	0	3	0	0	0	34	0
East Bengal B	2022–23	I-League 2nd Division	6	2	—		—		—		6	2
Mohammedan	2023–24	I-League	21	1	0	0	—		—		21	1
Mohammedan	2024–25	Indian Super League	9	0	1 (Note: Appearance(s) in Super Cup)	0	—		—		10	0
Mohammedan	Total		30	1	1	0	0	0	0	0	31	1
Diamond Harbour	2025–26	I-League	0	0	0	0	—		—		0	0
Career total			94	4	6	0	3	0	0	0	103	4
