= Ankit Mukherjee =

Indian footballer

Personal information
- Full name: Ankit Mukherjee
- Date of birth: 10 July 1996 (age 30)
- Place of birth: Kolkata, India
- Height: 1.76 m (5 ft 9 in)
- Position: Right-back

Team information
- Current team: Calicut
- Number: 99

Youth career
- 2014–2015: East Bengal

Senior career*
Years	Team	Apps	(Gls)
2015–2017	Aryan	34	(1)
2017–2018	Mohammedan	22	(2)
2018–2020	ATK	10	(1)
2020	Mohun Bagan	0	(0)
2021–2023	East Bengal	28	(0)
2023–2026	Chennaiyin	29	(2)
2026–	Calicut		
- * Club domestic league appearances and goals as of September 2026

Ankit Mukherjee (Bengali: অঙ্কিত মুখার্জি; born 10 July 1996) is an Indian professional footballer who plays as a right-back for Super League Kerala club Calicut.

== Career ==
Born in Kolkata, West Bengal, Mukherjee started his football career with Army Public School, Calcutta. In 2013, Mukherjee represented the school's football side in the Keventer Cup. He played the tournament at center back and impressed enough to earn a spot in the tournament's All Star side. In 2014, during a friendly match against East Bengal U19, Mukherjee impressed East Bengal's coach and was selected to join the squad.

Mukherjee spent a year and a half with East Bengal before signing with Calcutta Premier Division side Aryan. After sporadic appearances in his first season, he got a regular starting role during his second year. Mukherjee's performances with Aryan earned him a selection into West Bengal's squad for the Santosh Trophy in 2017 and 2018. His performances for West Bengal's winning squad in 2017 earned him a deal with Mohammedan. With Mohammedan, Mukherjee played for the club in the Calcutta Premier Division and I-League 2nd Division.

=== ATK ===
On 9 August 2018, it was announced that Mukherjee, along with seven other Bengali players, had signed with Indian Super League side ATK. He made his professional debut for the club on 10 November 2018 against Pune City. He came on as a 74th-minute substitute for Aiborlang Khongjee as ATK won 1–0. Mukherjee then earned his first start during ATK's next game against Mumbai City on 24 November. The match ended in a 0–0 draw.

=== East Bengal ===
On 2 January 2021, it was announced that Ankit has signed for Kolkata giants East Bengal with a free transfer from ATK Mohun Bagan. On 3 January, he made his debut for East Bengal as he came on in as a substitute in the 73rd minute for Raju Gaikwad as the team won 3–1.

== Career statistics ==
As of 4 February 2023

Club	Season	League			Cup		Continental		Total	
Club	Season	Division	Apps	Goals	Apps	Goals	Apps	Goals	Apps	Goals
Mohammedan Sporting	2017–18	I-League 2nd Div	10	1	0	0	—	—	10	1
ATK	2018–19	Indian Super League	9	1	1 (Note: Appearances in Super Cup)	0	—	—	10	1
ATK	2019–20	Indian Super League	1	0	2 (Note: Appearances in Durand Cup)	0	—	—	3	0
ATK	ATK total		10	1	3	0	—	—	13	1
Mohun Bagan	2020–21	Indian Super League	0	0	0	0	—	—	0	0
East Bengal	2020–21	Indian Super League	12	0	0	0	—	—	12	0
East Bengal	2021–22	Indian Super League	6	0	0	0	—	—	6	0
East Bengal	2022–23	Indian Super League	10	0	0	0	0	0	10	0
East Bengal	East Bengal total		28	0	0	0	—	—	28	0
Career total			48	2	3	0	0	0	51	2
