= Pritamkumar Singh Soraisam =

Indian footballer

Pritamkumar Singh
Personal information
- Full name: Pritamkumar Singh Soraisam
- Date of birth: 10 December 1995 (age 30)
- Place of birth: Bishnupur, Manipur, India
- Height: 1.74 m (5 ft 8 1/2 in)
- Position: Left back

Youth career
- 2010–2014: Sambalpur Football Academy
- 2014: Shillong Lajong

Senior career*
Years	Team	Apps	(Gls)
2014–2017	Shillong Lajong	38	(0)
2014	→ NorthEast United (loan)	0	(0)
2017–2020	Kerala Blasters	6	(0)
2020–2021	East Bengal	0	(0)
2021–2022	Hyderabad	2	(0)
2022–2023	East Bengal	2	(0)
2023–2024	TRAU	19	(0)
2024–2025	Rajasthan United	3	(0)

International career
2012–2013	India U20		
- * Club domestic league appearances and goals as of 16:58, 19 December 2024 (UTC)

Pritamkumar Singh Soraisam (Meitei: Soraisam Pritamkumar Singh, born 10 December 1995) is an Indian professional footballer who plays as a defender.

== Career ==
Born in Manipur, Singh was a part of the AIFF Elite Academy. Before the 2015–16 I-League, Singh was announced as part of the Shillong Lajong. He made his debut for the club on 10 January 2016 against Mumbai. He played the full match as Shillong Lajong drew 0–0.

=== Kerala Blasters ===
On 23 July 2017, Singh was selected in the 11th round of the 2017–18 ISL Players Draft by the Kerala Blasters for the 2017–18 Indian Super League. He made his debut for the club on 3 December 2017 against Mumbai City. He came on as a halftime minute substitute for Rino Anto as Kerala Blasters drew 1–1.

=== Hyderabad ===
On 18 August 2021, Singh signed for Hyderabad FC from East Bengal ahead of the 2021–22 Indian Super League.

== International ==
As part of the AIFF Elite Academy, Singh was also part of the India under-19 side.

== Career statistics ==
As of 9 September 2020

Club	Season	League			Cup		Continental		Total	
Club	Season	Division	Apps	Goals	Apps	Goals	Apps	Goals	Apps	Goals
Shillong Lajong	2014–15	I-League	5	0	—	—	—	—	5	0
Shillong Lajong	2015–16	I-League	15	0	—	—	—	—	15	0
Shillong Lajong	2016–17	I-League	18	0	—	—	—	—	18	0
Shillong Lajong	Shillong Lajong Total		38	0	0	0	0	0	38	0
NorthEast United (loan)	2014	ISL	0	0	—	—	—	—	0	0
Kerala Blasters	2017–18	ISL	1	0	—	—	—	—	1	0
Kerala Blasters	2018–19	ISL	5	0	1	0	—	—	6	0
Kerala Blasters	2019–20	ISL	0	0	0	0	—	—	0	0
Kerala Blasters	Total		6	0	1	0	—	—	7	0
East Bengal	2020–21	ISL	0	0	—	—	—	—	0	0
Career total			44	0	1	0	0	0	45	0
