= John Chidi Uzodinma =

Nigerian footballer

John Chidi
Personal information
- Full name: John Chidi Uzodinma
- Date of birth: 11 April 1994 (age 32)
- Place of birth: Abuja, Nigeria
- Height: 1.80 m (5 ft 11 in)
- Position: Striker

Senior career*
Years	Team	Apps	(Gls)
2014–2016	Durban Stars	29	(20)
2016–2017	Polokwane City	30	(15)
2019–2020	Mohammedan	6	(5)
2020–2021	BSS		
2021	Mohammedan	7	(1)
2021	United SC		
2021	Corbett	4	(1)
2021–2022	Travancore Royals		
2022	NEROCA	0	(0)
- * Club domestic league appearances and goals as of 10 March 2021

John Chidi Uzodinma (born 11 April 1994) is a Nigerian professional footballer who plays as a forward.

== Career ==
=== Early career ===
Born in Abuja, Nigeria, he started playing football from his childhood days. He started his career by playing in local clubs of Nigeria.

=== Club career ===
He played for various South African football clubs. In 2019–20 season he signed for I-League side Mohammedan SC. He spent two successful seasons scoring 6 goals in 12 appearances. He signed for the I-League side NEROCA FC in 2022–23 season. He scored a goal at the Imphal Derby for NEROCA FC.
