= Loken Meitei =

Indian footballer (born 1997)

Personal information
- Full name: Loken Meitei Moirangthem
- Date of birth: 4 May 1997 (age 29)
- Place of birth: Manipur, India
- Height: 1.70 m (5 ft 7 in)
- Positions: Midfielder; winger

Team information
- Current team: Delhi

Youth career
- 2012–2014: Royal Wahingdoh

Senior career*
Years	Team	Apps	(Gls)
2014–2016	Royal Wahingdoh	2	(0)
2016–2017	Real Kashmir	6	(0)
2017	Sagolband United	9	(1)
2017–2018	Kerala Blasters	6	(0)
2018–2019	Kerala Blasters B	7	(1)
2019–2020	TRAU	5	(0)
2020–2022	East Bengal	1	(0)
2022–2023	Real Kashmir	8	(0)
2023–	Delhi	0	(0)

International career
2015	India U19	3	(0)
- * Club domestic league appearances and goals as of 22:38, 8 February 2023 (UTC)

Loken Meitei Moirangthem (Meitei: Moirangthem Loken Meitei, born 4 May 1997) is an Indian professional footballer who plays as a midfielder or winger for I-League club Delhi.

== Career ==
Loken started his career with the youth set-up at Royal Wahingdoh before joining Shillong First Division side Shillong United for the 2014 season on loan.

He made his professional debut for Royal Wahingdoh in the I-League on 27 January 2015 against Bharat FC, coming on as a 93rd-minute substitute for Bekay Bewar as Royal Wahingdoh won 2–1.

=== Kerala Blasters ===
On 23 July 2017, Meitei was selected in the 13th round of the 2017–18 ISL Players Draft by the Kerala Blasters for the 2017–18 Indian Super League. He made his debut for the club on 9 December 2017 against Goa. He started and played 62 minutes as Kerala Blasters lost 5–2.

== Career statistics ==
=== Club ===
As of 8 February 2023

Club	Season	League			Cup		AFC		Total	
Club	Season	Division	Apps	Goals	Apps	Goals	Apps	Goals	Apps	Goals
Royal Wahingdoh	2014–15	I-League	2	0	0	0	—		2	0
Real Kashmir	2016–17	I-League 2nd Division	6	0	0	0	—		6	0
Kerala Blasters	2017–18	Indian Super League	6	0	1 (Note: Appearance(s) in Super Cup)	0	—		7	0
Kerala Blasters B	2017–18	I-League 2nd Division	3	1	0	0	—		3	1
Kerala Blasters B	2018–19	I-League 2nd Division	4	0	0	0	—		4	0
Kerala Blasters B	Kerala Blasters B total		7	1	0	0	0	0	7	1
TRAU	2019–20	I-League	5	0	0	0	—		5	0
East Bengal	2020–21	Indian Super League	1	0	0	0	—		1	0
Real Kashmir	2022–23	I-League	8	0	0	0	—		8	0
Delhi	2023–24	I-League	0	0	0	0	—		0	0
Career total			35	1	1	0	0	0	36	1
