= ATK Reserves And Academy =

Reserve team and youth system of Atlético de Kolkata

ATK Reserves and Academy
- Full name: Atlético de Kolkata Reserves and Academy
- Founded: August 15, 2018; 8 years ago
- Dissolved: June 1, 2020; 6 years ago
- Ground: Howrah Municipal Corporation Stadium
- Capacity: 15,000
- Owner(s): Kolkata Games and Sports Pvt. Ltd.
Home colours	Away colours

ATK Reserves and Academy, formerly known as Atlético de Kolkata Reserves and Academy, was the reserve team and youth system of the Indian Super League side ATK. The reserve side participated in the I-League 2nd Division, the second division of Indian football, and in Calcutta Football League, men's professional football league in the state. The club's academy was founded on 15 August 2018 and the Under-18 side participated in the serve side was last coached by Deggie Cardozo and veteran tactician Sanjoy Sen was the head of youth development.

== Reserves ==
ATK Reserves was ATK's most senior youth team and participated in I-League 2nd Division as well as in Calcutta Football League. Reserve team would also act as a bridge between the ATK Academy and the first team. A 24-member squad was announced on 27 October 2018.

The reserve team made their first appearance in Sikkim Gold Cup on 27 October 2018 and played their first ever match against fellow Kolkata side George Telegraph SC. The young side of ATK thrashed their comparatively experienced opponent by a margin of 5-1 goals to book their berth in the semi-final of the tournament. In the semi-final they lost to Manang Marshyangdi Club of Nepal.

On 13 July 2019, it was announced that reserves will play in the Calcutta Football League 2019 Division 1, a third-tier competition in CFL pyramid. A 29-member squad was also announced.

=== Inaugural season ===
ATK Reserves started the season with a comfortable 0–2 victory against city rivals Mohammedan SC at Kalyani Stadium. Thomyo Simray and Sk. Azaruddin scored the goals for ATK Reserves. ATK colts lost the next match to TRAU at home before winning against Jamshedpur FC Reserves by a 2–0 margin. The results of the next three matches had put Deggie Cardozo's men at backfoot where ATK drew 1 and lose 2 matches which included a 0-4 drubbing by Mohammedan at home.

On 9 March 2019 ATK reserves met Jamshedpur FC reserves in an away encounter which ended 0–4 in favour of the away side. In the final three matches of the season ATK Reserves won 1, drew 1 and lost 1. The joint highest goalscorers for ATK Reserves were captain Yumnam Gopi Singh and Thomyo Simray, both finishing the season with 5 goals.

== Last squad ==
Note: Flags indicate national team as defined under FIFA eligibility rules; some limited exceptions apply. Players may hold more than one non-FIFA nationality.

No.	Pos.	Nation	Player
1	GK	IND	Debnath Mondal
2	DF	IND	Sangay Bhutia
3	DF	IND	Ashraf Ali Mondal
5	DF	IND	Anil Chavan
6	MF	IND	Abhishek Suryavanshi
8	MF	IND	Joseph Vanlalhruaia
9	FW	IND	Asish Jha
10	MF	IND	Ragav Gupta
11	FW	IND	Fardin Ali Molla
12	DF	IND	Balaram Mandi
13	DF	IND	Brandon Green (captain)

No.	Pos.	Nation	Player
14	MF	IND	Ashish Pradhan
16	DF	IND	Manoranjan Singh
17	FW	IND	Sonu Halder
18	MF	IND	Satyam Jaiswara
19	FW	IND	William N Lengen
20	FW	IND	Bishnu Bordoloi
22	DF	IND	Buanthanglun Samte
23	MF	IND	Umair Syed
28	DF	IND	Rabilal Mandi
30	MF	IND	Malsawmzuala
31	GK	IND	Lara Sharma

== Academy ==
ATK opened their academy in Barasat, Kolkata in association with Aditya School of Sports. Also known as the ATK Aditya Football Academy, it followed the widely renowned structure, involving residential education with sports. The academy featured three age categories - U13, U15 and U18. Former United SC and Mohun Bagan coach Sanjoy Sen took charge of the academy teams. Sen had signed a 12-month contract with the two-time ISL champions.

=== U-18 team ===
ATK U18 team played in the Hero Elite League and was placed in the Kolkata Zone along with East Bengal, Mohun Bagan, SAI Kolkata, United SC and Rainbow AC. They finished third in the 2018 Hero Elite League zonal phase behind Mohun Bagan and East Bengal. Bishnu Bordoloi is the highest goalscorer of the team with 10 goals. The U18 team also played the 2018 IFA Shield and finished third in group stage.

== Last squad ==
Note: Flags indicate national team as defined under FIFA eligibility rules; some limited exceptions apply. Players may hold more than one non-FIFA nationality.

No.	Pos.	Nation	Player
1	GK	IND	Raja Burman
2	DF	IND	Viki Singha
3	DF	IND	Lalramchhuana
4	DF	IND	Rabilal Mandi
6	MF	IND	Singha (captain)
3	DF	IND	Lalramchhuana
4	DF	IND	Rabilal Mandi
5	DF	IND	Sumit Rathi
6	MF	IND	Vishal Mondal
7	MF	IND	Seigoumang Doungel
8	MF	IND	Joseph Vanlalhruaia
9	FW	IND	Md. Fardin Ali Molla
10	FW	IND	Bishnu Bordoloi
11	MF	IND	Goutam Das
12	MF	IND	R. Lalhriatzuala
13	DF	IND	Manash Pratim Sonowal
14	MF	IND	Timothy Thangkholal
15	FW	IND	Bikash Adhikary
16	MF	IND	Larry Lalrinawma

No.	Pos.	Nation	Player
17	MF	IND	Biren Rai
18	DF	IND	Mintu Mech
19	FW	IND	Umair Saiyyad
20	FW	IND	Asit Hembram
21	MF	IND	Mrinmoy Debbarma
22	FW	IND	Sagar Hansda
24	MF	IND	Takar sikom
25	FW	IND	Subungsa Basumatry
29	DF	IND	Seikhohao Haokip
31	GK	IND	Prateek Kumar Singh
33	DF	IND	Supriyo Ghosh
41	GK	IND	Aryan Niraj Lamba

== Head coach record ==
As of 12 January 2019

Name	Nationality	From	To	P	W	D	L	GF	GA	Win%
Deggie Cardozo	India	27 October 2018	2020	10	4	2	4	15	14	40.00

== Kit manufacturers and shirt sponsors ==
Period	Kit manufacturer	Shirt sponsor
2018–2020	Nivia	CESC

== See also ==
- Mohun Bagan Super Giant Reserves and Academy
