= Surchandra Singh =

Indian footballer (born 1994)

Personal information
- Full name: Surchandra Singh Chandam
- Date of birth: 5 January 1994 (age 32)
- Place of birth: Manipur, India
- Height: 1.72 m (5 ft 7 1/2 in)
- Position: Winger

Team information
- Current team: BSS Sporting

Youth career
- Langsning

Senior career*
Years	Team	Apps	(Gls)
2016	DSK Shivajians	13	(0)
2017	Churchill Brothers	9	(0)
2018	Mohun Bagan	4	(0)
2018–2019	Real Kashmir	16	(3)
2019–2020	Mumbai City	2	(0)
2020–2021	East Bengal	13	(0)
2021–2022	Real Kashmir	8	(2)
2022	Rajasthan United	0	(0)
2022–2023	NEROCA	3	(0)
2023–	BSS Sporting	0	(0)
- * Club domestic league appearances and goals as of 21:50, 21 December 2023 (UTC)

Surchandra Singh Chandam (born 5 January 1994) is an Indian professional footballer who plays as a winger for Calcutta Football League club BSS Sporting.

== Career ==
Born in Manipur, Singh started his career with Langsning in the I-League 2nd Division before moving to I-League side DSK Shivajians. He made his debut for DSK Shivajians on 17 January 2016 against Sporting Goa.

=== Rajasthan United ===
In August 2022, Rajasthan United secured the signature of Singh ahead of the Durand Cup campaign. He left the club a month later without making a single appearance.

=== NEROCA ===
In September 2022, Singh joined I-League club NEROCA on a one-year deal. On 5 September, he made his debut for the club Chennaiyin in the Durand Cup, which ended in a 2–0 loss.

== Career statistics ==
=== Club ===
As of 21 December 2022

Club	Season	League			Cup		AFC		Total	
Club	Season	Division	Apps	Goals	Apps	Goals	Apps	Goals	Apps	Goals
DSK Shivajians	2015–16	I-League	13	0	0	0	–		13	0
Churchill Brothers	2016–17	I-League	9	0	2 (Note: Appearance(s) in Federation Cup)	0	–		11	0
Mohun Bagan	2017–18	I-League	4	0	0	0	–		4	0
Real Kashmir	2018–19	I-League	16	3	1 (Note: Appearance(s) in Super Cup)	0	–		17	3
Mumbai City	2019–20	Indian Super League	2	0	0	0	–		2	0
East Bengal	2020–21	Indian Super League	13	0	0	0	–		13	0
Real Kashmir	2021–22	I-League	8	2	0	0	–		8	2
Rajasthan United	2023–23	I-League	0	0	0	0	–		0	0
NEROCA	2023–23	I-League	3	0	1 (Note: Appearance(s) in Durand Cup)	0	–		4	0
Career total			68	5	4	0	0	0	72	5

== Honours ==
Real Kashmir

- IFA Shield: 2021
