= Kenichi Yatsuhashi =

Association football club manager

Personal information
- Date of birth: February 6, 1969 (age 57)
- Place of birth: Kōnan, Aichi, Japan

Managerial career
- Years: Team
- 2001–2009: BMCC men's soccer
- 2010–2011: ASA College
- 2014–2015: Aspire Academy U16 (assistant coach)
- 2015–2016: Hearts of Oak
- 2016: Ifeanyi Ubah F.C.
- 2017: Cambodian Tiger FC
- 2017–2018: International Allies FC
- 2019–2020: Lonestar Kashmir
- 2021–2022: Navy Sea Hawks
- 2022–2023: Angthong

Kenichi Yatsuhashi (Japanese: 八橋健一, born 6 February 1969 in Japan) is a Japanese football manager who currently manages football club Angthong in the Thai League 3 Western region.

== Career ==
=== College and youth coaching career ===
Arriving at New York City in December 1988, he began coaching youth soccer teams: the Elmont Ravens girls' team, the Brooklyn Patriots boys' team, and the Gotham Girls Chargers team. Next, Yatsuhashi became coach of the BMCC men's soccer team where he served as the women's coach for 9 years and guided them to the NJCAA Division III nationals in 2004 and won third place plus six conference championships. Just after that, he was chosen coach of the City University of New York Athletic Conference All-Star team which competed in the Goodwill South African Tour.

His original reason for going to the United States was to study art. At one point, he could have become an American citizen, but the paperwork and application fees amounted to over US$1000 so he decided not to apply and has now expressed penitence for passing on the opportunity.

=== Africa and Asia ===
In 2012, Kenichi moved to Kyrgyzstan where he served as the Kyrgyzstan Football Federation technical director and Kyrgyzstan U16 coach. He has guided them during U16 AFC Qualifications and recorded 3–3 draw against Oman and lost to Qatar by 3–4.

Announced as coach of Accra Hearts of Oak in November 2015, he was given a monthly salary of US$1,800 and became the first Asian to coach a Ghanaian team in the process. Almost immediately, he was criticized on account of his inexperience coaching professional teams. Eventually, he was fired as coach in June 2016 despite winning his first two games in charge and leading his team at the top or 2nd of the table. With Hearts of Oak, he was known for making his team score mostly second-half goals. In addition to this, the club had a record of being unbeaten in 7 away games under Kenichi. Meanwhile, he had refuted claims that his team's good form was because of impermissible drugs, claiming that it was a result of hard work and training.

Kenichi has ruled out a possible return to Hearts of Oak amidst speculation.

Ifeanyi Ubah F.C. discharged him of his duties in 2016. Thereupon, he was appointed coach of Cambodian Tiger FC in the C-League in February 2017.

Only three months after his arrival in 2017, Cambodian Tiger FC parted away with Kenichi; he has expressed desire to return to coaching in Ghana and has hinted at a move to Asante Kotoko. On 28 December 2019, he was appointed coach of Lonestar Kashmir in the I-League 2nd division.

== Personal life ==
Living in New York City for 23 years, he sees it as his home even though he is ethnically Japanese.

== Licenses and certifications ==
- NSCAA Coach of the Year Award
- AFC Pro License
- USSF "A" License
- USSF National Youth License
- CONCACAF International Coaching License
- FIFA Goalkeeping License
- NSCAA Goalkeeping Diploma
