= 2016–17 I-League U18 =

I-League U18
- Season: 2016–17
- Champions: AIFF Elite Academy
- Matches: 139
- Goals: 445 (3.2 per match)

The 2016–17 I-League U18 was the ninth season of the Indian I-League U18 and the second season of the competition as an under-18 one. The season began on 15 November with 35 teams divided into eight groups across India. The top 12 teams played in the final group stage in which they were divided into three groups of four and the top team from each group, along with the top second place team, went into the semi-finals, followed by the final. AIFF Elite Academy won the title by defeating East Bengal F.C. in the final.

== Teams ==
Kolkata	Maharashtra	Shillong–Guwahati	Delhi	Goa	Rest of India A, B, or C
East Bengal	DSK Shivajians	Gauhati Town Club	Bhaichung Bhutia Football Schools	AIFF Elite Academy	Aizawl; Bengaluru FC; Fateh Hyderabad; J&K Bank; Lonestar Kashmir; Minerva Academy; NEROCA; Ozone; Pride Sports; Real Kashmir; Tata Football Academy
Mohun Bagan	Kenkre	Rangdajied United	Delhi United	Dempo	Aizawl; Bengaluru FC; Fateh Hyderabad; J&K Bank; Lonestar Kashmir; Minerva Academy; NEROCA; Ozone; Pride Sports; Real Kashmir; Tata Football Academy
Mohammedan	Mumbai	Royal Wahingdoh	Hindustan	Salgaocar	Aizawl; Bengaluru FC; Fateh Hyderabad; J&K Bank; Lonestar Kashmir; Minerva Academy; NEROCA; Ozone; Pride Sports; Real Kashmir; Tata Football Academy
SAI Kolkata	PIFA	SAI Guwahati	Sudeva Moonlight	Sporting Goa	Aizawl; Bengaluru FC; Fateh Hyderabad; J&K Bank; Lonestar Kashmir; Minerva Academy; NEROCA; Ozone; Pride Sports; Real Kashmir; Tata Football Academy
Southern Samity	Pune City	Shillong Lajong			Aizawl; Bengaluru FC; Fateh Hyderabad; J&K Bank; Lonestar Kashmir; Minerva Academy; NEROCA; Ozone; Pride Sports; Real Kashmir; Tata Football Academy
United					Aizawl; Bengaluru FC; Fateh Hyderabad; J&K Bank; Lonestar Kashmir; Minerva Academy; NEROCA; Ozone; Pride Sports; Real Kashmir; Tata Football Academy

== First round ==
Tiebreakers
The teams are ranked according to points (3 points for a win, 1 point for a draw, 0 points for a loss). If two or more teams are equal on points on completion of the group matches, the following criteria are applied in the order given to determine the rankings:
1. Greater number of points obtained in the matches between the Teams concerned
2. Goal difference resulting from the matches between the Teams concerned
3. Greater number of goals scored in the matches between the Teams concerned
4. Goal difference in all the matches
5. Greater number of goals scored in all the matches
6. Drawing of lots

=== Kolkata zone ===
Pos	Team	Pld	W	D	L	GF	GA	GD	Pts	Qualification	MB	EB	USC	SAI	MSC	SS
1	Mohun Bagan (Note: Mohun Bagan disqualified for fielding over-age player.)	10	7	2	1	17	5	+12	23		—	1–1	2–1	1–0	2–0	5–1
2	East Bengal	10	7	2	1	14	2	+12	23	Advance to final round	1–0	—	0–0	2–0	3–0	2–0
3	United	10	6	1	3	18	10	+8	19	Advance to final round	0–1	0–1	—	4–3	2–1	3–2
4	SAI Kolkata	10	3	3	4	13	11	+2	12		1–1	1–0	0–1	—	0–0	2–0
5	Mohammedan	10	1	2	7	5	12	−7	5		0–1	0–1	0–1	1–1	—	0–1
6	Southern Samity	10	1	0	9	5	32	−27	3		0–3	0–3	0–6	1–5	0–3	—

Source: I-league

=== Maharashtra zone ===
Pos	Team	Pld	W	D	L	GF	GA	GD	Pts	Qualification	PC	DSK	MFC	KSC	PIFA
1	Pune City	8	8	0	0	30	3	+27	24	Advance to final round	—	3–0	2–1	7–0	5–0
2	DSK Shivajians	8	5	1	2	33	10	+23	16	Advance to final round	1–2	—	4–1	1–1	6–0
3	Mumbai	8	3	1	4	16	15	+1	10		1–1	1–5	—	2–0	6–0
4	Kenkre	8	2	2	4	11	23	−12	8		1–3	1–10	0–0	—	3–0
5	PIFA	8	0	0	8	2	44	−42	0		0–8	1–6	1–5	0–5	—

Source: I-league

=== Shillong–Guwahati zone ===
Pos	Team	Pld	W	D	L	GF	GA	GD	Pts	Qualification	RW	SL	GT	RU	SAI
1	Royal Wahingdoh	8	7	1	0	25	4	+21	22	Advance to final round	—	5–1	2–0	4–0	3–2
2	Shillong Lajong	8	5	0	3	11	10	+1	15	Advance to final round	0–3	—	2–0	0–1	4–1
3	Gauhati Town	8	3	1	4	7	10	−3	10		0–3	0–1	—	1–1	1–0
4	Rangdajied United	8	1	4	3	7	14	−7	7		0–0	0–2	1–3	—	2–2
5	SAI Guwahati	8	0	2	6	8	20	−12	2		1–5	0–1	0–2	2–2	—

Source: I-league

=== Goa zone ===
Pos	Team	Pld	W	D	L	GF	GA	GD	Pts	Qualification	AIFF	SAL	DSC	SCG
1	AIFF Academy	6	5	0	1	16	3	+13	15	Advance to final round	—	1–2	8–0	3–1
2	Salgaocar	6	3	1	2	11	7	+4	10	Advance to final round	0–1	—	2–2	2–3
3	Dempo	6	1	2	3	3	14	−11	5		0–2	0–2	—	1–0
4	SC Goa	6	1	1	4	4	10	−6	4		0–1	0–3	0–0	—

Source: I-league

=== Delhi zone ===
Pos	Team	Pld	W	D	L	GF	GA	GD	Pts	Qualification (Note: All games played at Ambedkar Stadium.)	BBFS	SDV	HIN	DU
1	Bhaichung Bhutia FS	6	4	0	2	10	13	−3	12	Advance to final round	—	3–2	2–1	2–8
2	Sudeva Moonlight	6	3	1	2	12	7	+5	10		1–0	—	0–1	2–0
3	Hindustan	6	3	1	2	8	6	+2	10		1–2	2–2	—	2–0
4	Delhi United	6	1	0	5	9	13	−4	3		0–1	1–5	0–1	—

Source: U-18 I-league

=== Rest of India – Group A ===
Pos	Team	Pld	W	D	L	GF	GA	GD	Pts	Qualification (Note: All games played at Bangalore Football Stadium.)	BFC	OZ	FH
1	Bengaluru FC	4	3	1	0	17	1	+16	10	Advance to final round	—	0–0	7–0
2	Ozone FC	4	1	1	2	7	8	−1	4		1–5	—	0–3
3	Fateh Hyderabad	4	1	0	3	3	18	−15	3		0–5	0–6	—

Source: U-18 I-league

=== Rest of India – Group B ===
Pos	Team	Pld	W	D	L	GF	GA	GD	Pts	Qualification (Note: All games played at JRD Tata Sports Complex.)	TFA	AFC	NER	PS
1	Tata Football Academy	6	3	3	0	7	3	+4	12	Advance to final round	—	0–0	3–1	1–1
2	Aizawl	6	3	1	2	12	4	+8	10		0–1	—	0–1	5–0
3	NEROCA	6	3	1	2	8	9	−1	10		1–1	1–4	—	2–0
4	Pride Sports	6	0	1	5	3	14	−11	1		0–1	1–3	1–2	—

Source: U-18 I-league

=== Rest of India – Group C ===
Pos	Team	Pld	W	D	L	GF	GA	GD	Pts	Qualification (Note: All games played at Ambedkar Stadium.)	MIN	RK	LK	JKB
1	Minerva Punjab	3	3	0	0	9	3	+6	9	Advance to final round	—	3–1	1–0	5–2
2	Real Kashmir	3	2	0	1	10	5	+5	6			—	6–1	3–1
3	Lonestar Kashmir	3	1	0	2	3	8	−5	3				—	2–1
4	J&K Bank	3	0	0	3	4	10	−6	0					—

Source: U-18 I-league

== Final round ==
Final round will feature 12 teams qualified from first round. The teams are drawn into three groups of four teams. Three group winners and one best second placed team enter semifinal.

=== Groups ===
Group A
Pos	Team	Pld	W	D	L	GF	GA	GD	Pts	Qualification (Note: All games played at Kalyani Stadium, Kolkata.)
1	United	3	3	0	0	17	3	+14	9	Advance to semifinal
2	Salgaocar	3	2	0	1	14	9	+5	6	Advance to semifinal
3	Royal Wahingdoh	3	1	0	2	4	7	−3	3	
4	Bhaichung Bhutia FS	3	0	0	3	3	19	−16	0	

Source: U-18 I-league
Notes:

Group B
Pos	Team	Pld	W	D	L	GF	GA	GD	Pts	Qualification (Note: All games played at East Bengal Ground, Kolkata.)
1	East Bengal	3	2	1	0	6	3	+3	7	Advance to semifinal
2	Pune City	3	2	0	1	3	3	0	6	
3	Tata Football Academy	3	1	0	2	1	2	−1	3	
4	Shillong Lajong	3	0	1	2	2	4	−2	1	

Source: U-18 I-league
Notes:

Group C
Pos	Team	Pld	W	D	L	GF	GA	GD	Pts	Qualification (Note: All games played at Barasat Stadium, Kolkata.)
1	AIFF Academy	3	2	0	1	6	3	+3	6	Advance to semifinal
2	DSK Shivajians	3	1	1	1	5	5	0	4 (Note: DSK Shivajians head of Bengaluru FC on number of goals scored, head-to-head record and goal-difference being the same.)	
3	Bengaluru FC	3	1	1	1	1	1	0	4	
4	Minerva Punjab	3	1	0	2	5	8	−3	3	

Source: U-18 I-league

=== Ranking of runner-up teams ===
Pos	Grp	Team	Pld	W	D	L	GF	GA	GD	Pts	Qualification
1	A	Salgaocar	3	2	0	1	14	9	+5	6 (Note: Salgaocar ahead of Pune City on goal-difference)	Advance to semifinal
2	B	Pune City	3	2	0	1	3	3	0	6	
3	C	DSK Shivajians	3	1	1	1	5	5	0	4	

Source: U-18 I-league

== Knock–out stage ==
=== Bracket ===
Semi-Finals
United	0 (12)
AIFF Academy	0 (13)
East Bengal	3
Salgaocar	2

Final
AIFF Academy	2
East Bengal	1
Third Place

=== Semi-finals ===
5 May 2017
09:00 IST

United	0–0	AIFF Academy
	Report
Penalties
	12–13

Barasat Stadium, Kolkata
Attendance: 100
Referee: Valenton Raphael Fernandes
5 May 2017
15:30 IST

East Bengal	3–2	Salgaocar
Bidyashagar Singh 14'; Suranjit Singh 43', 60'	Report	Andrus John 80'; Liston Colaco 86'

Barasat Stadium, Kolkata
Attendance: 500
Referee: Ravindra Thapliyal

=== Final ===
7 May 2017
15:30 IST

AIFF Academy	2–1	East Bengal
Lalengmawia 15'; Namgyal Bhutia 42'	Report	Bidyashagar Singh 14'

Barasat Stadium, Kolkata
Attendance: 1000
Referee: Valenton Raphael Fernandes

== Statistics ==
=== Top Scorers ===
Rank	Player	Club	Goals
1	(India) Liston Colaco	Salgaocar	16
2	(India) Lalawmpuia	DSK Shivajians	14
3	(India) Dipankar Baral	United	10
3	(India) Sandip Bhattacharjee	United	10
5	(India) Lalcchanhima	East Bengal	8
5	(India) Kh. Tajuddin	Royal Wahingdoh	8
7	(India) Sirandeep Moran	Royal Wahingdoh	7
7	(India) Pranjal Bhumij	DSK Shivajians	7
7	(India) Mohammad Asrar Rehbar	Real Kashmir	7
10	(India) Bidyashagar Singh	East Bengal	6
