= 2017–18 I-League 2nd Division =

11th season of the I-League 2nd Division

I-League 2nd Division
- Season: 2017–18
- Champions: Real Kashmir
- Promoted: Real Kashmir
- Matches: 95
- Goals: 274 (2.88 per match)
- Top goalscorer: Robert Ribeiro (10 goals)
- Biggest home win: Ozone 7–0 Madhya Bharat
- Biggest away win: Kerala Blasters (R) 1–5 Kerala
- Highest scoring: Ozone 7–0 Madhya Bharat

The 2017–18 I-League 2nd Division (known as Hero 2017–18 I-League 2nd Division, for sponsorship reasons) was the 11th season of the I-League 2nd Division, the second division Indian football league, since its establishment in 2008. The season started with the preliminary rounds from 14 March to 15 May 2018. The final round of the league took place between 21 May to 30 May 2018 at FSV Arena, Bengaluru.

This season featured 18 teams, divided into three groups of six teams each. The season also featured the reserve sides of seven Indian Super League clubs, none of which were eligible to qualify for the final round. Real Kashmir won the title on 30 May 2018 and earned the promotion to 2018–19 I-League. They also made history becoming first team from state of Jammu & Kashmir to enter the first division of I-League

== Format ==
Just like the previous season, the I-League 2nd Division will feature a preliminary round and a final round. During the preliminary round, the 18 teams will be divided into three groups of six teams each. All the matches during the preliminary round will be played in a double round-robin basis, in which every team plays all others in their group once at home and once away. The winners of the three groups, along with the best second placed team, will qualify for the final round. The seven Indian Super League reserve sides in the league will not be eligible to qualify for the final round.

During the final round, the four teams will face each other in a single-leg league system at a neutral venue, where each team faces each other once. At the end of the round, the team in first will earn promotion to the next division of Indian football.

== Teams ==
Locations of the 2017–18 I-League 2nd Division teams

=== Stadiums and locations ===
Team	City/State	Stadium	Capacity
Bengaluru (R)	Bengaluru, Karnataka	Bangalore Football Stadium	8,400
Chennaiyin (R)	Chennai, Tamil Nadu	SSN College Ground	TBA
Delhi Dynamos (R)	Delhi	Ambedkar Stadium	35,000
Delhi United	Delhi	Greater Noida Sports Complex Ground	TBA
Fateh Hyderabad	Anantapur, Andhra Pradesh	Anantapur Sports Village Football Ground	TBA
Goa (R)	Margao, Goa	Fatorda Stadium	19,000
Hindustan	Delhi	Ambedkar Stadium	35,000
Jamshedpur (R)	Jamshedpur, Jharkhand	JRD Tata Sports Complex	24,500
Kerala	Thrissur, Kerala	Thrissur Municipal Corporation Stadium	15,000
Kerala Blasters (R)	Kochi, Kerala	Maharaja's College Stadium	15,000
Langsning	Shillong, Meghalaya	Jawaharlal Nehru Stadium	30,000
Lonestar Kashmir	Srinagar, Jammu and Kashmir	TRC Turf Ground	15,000
Madhya Bharat	Bhopal, Madhya Pradesh	JLU Ground	TBA
Mohammedan	Kolkata, West Bengal	Barasat Stadium	22,000
Ozone	Bengaluru, Karnataka	Bangalore Football Stadium	8,400
Pune City (R)	Pune, Maharashtra	Pirangute Football Ground	TBA
Real Kashmir	Srinagar, Jammu and Kashmir	TRC Turf Ground	15,000
TRAU	Manipur	Khuman Lampak Main Stadium	35,000

=== Personnel and kits ===
Team	Manager	Kit manufacturer	Shirt sponsor
Bengaluru (R)	(India) Naushad Moosa	Puma	JSW
Chennaiyin (R)	(India) Syed Sabir Pasha	Performax	Apollo Tyres
Delhi Dynamos (R)	(Spain) Francisco Perez Lazaro	T10 Sports	Kent RO Systems
Delhi United	(Portugal) Hugo Martins	None	Peregrine Aviation
Goa (R)	(India) Clifford Miranda	None	None
Fateh Hyderabad	(India) Ellimishetty Shyam	None	Premier
Hindustan	(India) Vikrant Sharma	Cosco	Hero Motocorp
Jamshedpur (R)	(India) Hilal Parray	Nivia	Tata
Kerala	(India) T G Purushothaman	TGP	Yogakshemam Loans
Kerala Blasters (R)	(India) Renjith Ajithkumar	Admiral	Muthoot
Langsning	(India) Hering Shangpliang	None	Lotto
Lonestar Kashmir	(Brazil) Clebson Duarte da Silva	TBA	TBA
Madhya Bharat	(Spain) José Carlos Hevia	None	None
Mohammedan	(India) Biswajit Bhattacharya	Kaizen	TBA
Ozone	(England) Dave Booth	None	Ozone Group
Pune City (R)	(Spain) Roger Lamesa Grau	Adidas	Suzuki Gixxer
Real Kashmir	(Scotland) David Robertson	TBA	TBA
TRAU	(India) L Nandakumar Singh	Nike	HVS

=== Foreign players ===
Each club, excluding the Indian Super League reserve sides, can register three foreign players in their squad. One of the foreign players has to be from an AFC Member Nation.

Club	Player 1	Player 2	AFC player
Delhi United	(Ivory Coast) Ladji Saika Sylla	(Ivory Coast) Kouame Konan Zacharie	
Fateh Hyderabad	(Ghana) Edmund Owusu Peprah	(Ghana) Godwin Quashiga	(Uzbekistan) Nuriev Vladislav
Hindustan	(Angola) Amestrong Alexandré	(Nigeria) Martins Rami	
Kerala	(Guinea) Abdoul Karim Sylla	(Nigeria) Bala Alhassan Dahir	
Langsning	(Ivory Coast) Lancine Toure	(Brazil) Jacson Glei Da Silva Clemente	(Japan) Kento Sakurai
Lonestar Kashmir	(France) Alexandre Tabillon		
Madhya Bharat	(Mali) Ibrahim Sylla		
Mohammedan	(Ethiopia) Fikru Teferra	(Nigeria) Echezona Anyichie	(Syria) Wael Ayan
Ozone	(Brazil) Robert de Souza Ribeiro	(Nigeria) Chika Wali	(South Korea) Son Yong-chan
Real Kashmir	(Nigeria) Loveday Enyinnaya	(Ivory Coast) Yao Kouassi Bernard	
TRAU	(Nigeria) Princewell Emeka	(France) Christoppe Jonnette	

== Preliminary round ==
Tiebreakers
The teams are ranked according to points (3 points for a win, 1 point for a draw, 0 points for a loss). If two or more teams are equal on points on completion of the group matches, the following criteria are applied in the order given to determine the rankings:
1. Greater number of points obtained in the matches between the Teams concerned
2. Goal difference resulting from the matches between the Teams concerned
3. Greater number of goals scored in the matches between the Teams concerned
4. Goal difference in all the matches
5. Greater number of goals scored in all the matches
6. Drawing of lots

=== Group A ===
Pos	Team	Pld	W	D	L	GF	GA	GD	Pts	Qualification	RKFC	HIN	FCP	DU	DD	LK
1	Real Kashmir	10	6	4	0	15	8	+7	22	Advance to Final round	—	3–3	0–0	1–0	2–0	2–1
2	Hindustan	10	5	5	0	13	7	+6	20	Advance to Final round	0–0	—	0–0	4–2	2–1	1–0
3	Pune City (R) (Note: Reserves team are ineligible for advance to the next round)	10	2	7	1	10	9	+1	13		0–1	0–0	—	3–3	1–0	3–2
4	Delhi United	10	1	6	3	10	11	−1	9		1–1	0–0	0–0	—	0–1	3–0
5	Delhi Dynamos (R)	9	2	2	5	5	9	−4	8		2–3	0–1	0–0	0–0	—	a
6	Lonestar Kashmir	9	0	2	7	9	18	−9	2		1–2	1–2	3–3	1–1	0–1	—

Source: soccerway

==== Fixtures and results ====
20 March 2018	Hindustan	4–2	Delhi United	Delhi
16:00 IST	Kushant Chauhan 12', 14'; Utkarsh Kaushik 32'; Thomyo L Shimray 53'		Rungsing Muinao 45'; Sunny Varun Thakur 75'	Stadium: Ambedkar Stadium; Attendance: 330; Referee: Dipu Roy

20 March 2018	Lonestar Kashmir	0–1	Delhi Dynamos (R)	Srinagar
14:00 IST			Seiminmang Manchong 30'	Stadium: TRC Turf Ground; Attendance: 3,000; Referee: Tanmoy Dhar

21 March 2018	Real Kashmir	0–0	Pune City (R)	Srinagar
14:00 IST				Stadium: TRC Turf Ground; Attendance: 5,992; Referee: Pratik Mondal

24 March 2018	Real Kashmir	2–0	Delhi Dynamos (R)	Srinagar
14:00 IST	Ifham Tariq Mir 36'; Kouassi Yao 88'			Stadium: TRC Turf Ground; Attendance: 1,800; Referee: Williams Joy Koshy

25 March 2018	Lonestar Kashmir	3–3	Pune City (R)	Srinagar
14:00 IST	Aakif Javaid 66', 72', 89'		C. Lyngdoh 7', 80'; Yadav Rahul 86'	Stadium: TRC Turf Ground; Attendance: 2,000; Referee: Shubhankar Khamri

28 March 2018	Real Kashmir	2–1	Lonestar Kashmir	Srinagar
14:00 IST	Danish Farooq 32'; Atinder Mani 79'		Aakif Javaid 44'	Stadium: TRC Turf Ground; Attendance: 1,800; Referee: Debashis Mandi

28 March 2018	Delhi United	0–0	Pune City (R)	Delhi
16:00 IST				Stadium: Ambedkar Stadium; Attendance: 100; Referee: Rafeek Babu Mannamparambath

29 March 2018	Delhi Dynamos (R)	0–1	Hindustan	Delhi
16:00 IST			Thomyo L Shimray 39'	Stadium: Ambedkar Stadium; Attendance: 200; Referee: Sumiraj Poorathil Sudhakaran

2 April 2018	Pune City (R)	0–0	Hindustan	Pune
16:30 IST				Stadium: Pirangute Football Ground; Attendance: 60; Referee: Khamruddin Mohammed Avez

3 April 2018	Delhi United	3–0	Lonestar Kashmir	Delhi
16:00 IST	Md. Shahjahan 18'; Sunny Varun Thakur 29'; Rungsing Muinao 71'			Stadium: Ambedkar Stadium; Attendance: 110; Referee: Shubhankar Khamri

7 April 2018	Hindustan	1–0	Lonestar Kashmir	Delhi
16:00 IST	Maneshwar Mushahary 38'			Stadium: Ambedkar Stadium; Attendance: 200; Referee: Rabichandra Singh Irengbam

8 April 2018	Delhi United	1–1	Real Kashmir	Delhi
12:00 IST	Gursimrat Singh 40'		Danish Farooq 57'	Stadium: Ambedkar Stadium; Attendance: 75; Referee: Priyobarta Singh Langpoklakpam

8 April 2018	Pune City (R)	1–0	Delhi Dynamos (R)	Pune
16:30 IST	Yadav Rahul 58'			Stadium: Pirangute Football Ground; Attendance: 50; Referee: Paramanand Mandrekar

12 April 2018	Hindustan	0–0	Real Kashmir	Delhi
16:00 IST				Stadium: Ambedkar Stadium; Attendance: 140; Referee: Rosario Fernandes

13 April 2018	Delhi Dynamos (R)	0–0	Delhi United	Delhi
16:00 IST				Stadium: Ambedkar Stadium; Attendance: 200; Referee: Crystal John

17 April 2018	Lonestar Kashmir	1–2	Hindustan	Srinagar
14:00 IST	Aakif Javaid 16'		Thomyo L Shimray 71'; Kushant Chauhan 79'	Stadium: TRC Turf Ground; Attendance: 400; Referee: Akash Jackson Routh

18 April 2018	Real Kashmir	1–0	Delhi United	Srinagar
15:00 IST	Atinder Mani 41'			Stadium: TRC Turf Ground; Attendance: 600; Referee: Khamruddin Mohammed Avez

21 April 2018	Real Kashmir	3–3	Hindustan	Srinagar
15:00 IST	Kouassi Yao 5'; Atinder Mani 31'; Ifham Tariq Mir 57'		Pawan Pratap Singh 59'; Pushpender Kundu 66'; Amestrong Alexandre 76'	Stadium: TRC Turf Ground; Attendance: 350; Referee: Ranjit Bakshi

22 April 2018	Lonestar Kashmir	1–1	Delhi United	Srinagar
14:00 IST	Aakif Javaid 28'		Kouame Zacharie 83'	Stadium: TRC Turf Ground; Attendance: 1,000; Referee: Mithun Kumar Kundu

23 April 2018	Delhi Dynamos (R)	0–0	Pune City (R)	Delhi
16:00 IST				Stadium: Ambedkar Stadium; Attendance: 150; Referee: Pratik Mondal

26 April 2018	Lonestar Kashmir	1–2	Real Kashmir	Srinagar
15:00 IST	Dashyang Kachru Ooo 60'		Ritwik Kumar Das 15'; Ifham Tariq Mir 44'	Stadium: TRC Turf Ground; Attendance: 600; Referee: Umesh Bora

27 April 2018	Hindustan	0–0	Pune City (R)	Delhi
16:00 IST				Stadium: Ambedkar Stadium; Attendance: 75; Referee: Gibin Baby Kalarickal

1 May 2018	Hindustan	2–1	Delhi Dynamos (R)	Delhi
16:00 IST	Thomyo L Shimray 45+2'; Asifullah Khan 81'		Seiminmang Manchong 67'	Stadium: Ambedkar Stadium; Attendance: 200; Referee: Rahul Kumar Gupta

2 May 2018	Pune City (R)	3–3	Delhi United	Pune
16:30 IST	Gani Ahmmed Nigam 11'; C. Lyngdoh 45+4'; Omkar More 58'		Rungsing Muinao 45+1'; Kouame Zacharie 64'; Arkwis Wanniang 88'	Stadium: Pirangute Football Ground; Attendance: 40; Referee: Williams Joy Koshy

7 May 2018	Delhi Dynamos (R)	2–3	Real Kashmir	Delhi
16:00 IST	Seiminmang Manchong 78'; Kuber Bist 89'		Atinder Mani 23'; Danish Farooq 35'; Ritwik Kumar Das 39'	Stadium: Ambedkar Stadium; Attendance: 150; Referee: Pranjal Banerjee

8 May 2018	Pune City (R)	3–2	Lonestar Kashmir	Pune
16:30 IST	Jakob Vanlalhimpuia 36', 47'; Gourav Bora 51'		Aakif Javaid 6'; Karun Raina 28'	Stadium: Pirangute Football Ground; Attendance: 50; Referee: Tejas Visvasrao Nagvenkar

10 May 2018	Delhi United	0–1	Delhi Dynamos (R)	Delhi
12:00 IST			Seiminmang Manchong 45+3'	Stadium: Ambedkar Stadium; Attendance: 110; Referee: Tanmoy Dhar

13 May 2018	Delhi United	0–0	Hindustan	Delhi
12:00 IST				Stadium: Ambedkar Stadium; Attendance: 150; Referee: Ajitkumar Meitei Leirenlakpam

13 May 2018	Delhi Dynamos (R)	abandoned	Lonestar Kashmir	Delhi
16:00 IST				Stadium: Ambedkar Stadium

13 May 2018	Pune City (R)	0–1	Real Kashmir	Pune
16:30 IST			Kouassi Yao 21'	Stadium: Pirangute Football Ground; Attendance: 150; Referee: Paramanand Jaganath Mandrekar

=== Group B ===
Pos	Team	Pld	W	D	L	GF	GA	GD	Pts	Qualification	KB	OFC	FCK	FH	FCG	MBSC
1	Kerala Blasters (R) (Note: Reserves team are ineligible for advance to the next round)	10	7	0	3	25	17	+8	21		—	1–4	1–5	3–2	2–1	6–0
2	Ozone	10	5	4	1	19	3	+16	19	Advance to Final round	0–1	—	1–0	0–0	0–0	7–0
3	FC Kerala	10	6	1	3	19	12	+7	19		3–2	0–2	—	2–1	2–1	3–0
4	Fateh Hyderabad	10	5	2	3	23	16	+7	17		2–4	0–0	4–2	—	3–2	2–1
5	Goa (R)	10	2	3	5	13	15	−2	9		0–2	1–1	0–0	1–4	—	5–1
6	Madhya Bharat	10	0	0	10	3	39	−36	0		0–3	0–4	0–2	1–5	0–2	—

Updated to match(es) played on unknown. Source: soccerway

==== Fixtures and results ====
16 March 2018	Kerala Blasters (R)	1–4	Ozone	Kochi
16:00 IST	Riswanali 82'		Robert Ribiero 21' (pen.), 42'; Sabeeth 28', 41'	Stadium: Jawaharlal Nehru Stadium; Attendance: 750; Referee: Srikanth Bohidar

16 March 2018	Goa (R)	5–1	Madhya Bharat	Margao
16:00 IST	Colaco 2'; Aren D Silva 17', 67'; Mohammed Yasir 45+2'; Krishna Pandit 59'	Report	Haileuyibe Irrangau 49'	Stadium: GMC Athletic Stadium; Attendance: 500; Referee: Rosario Fernandes

17 March 2018	FC Kerala	2–1	Fateh Hyderabad	Thrissur
16:00 IST	Jonas M.J. 23'; Jasman Gurung 45' (o.g.)		Lalrin Fela 41'	Stadium: Thrissur Municipal Corporation Stadium; Attendance: 1,500; Referee: Williams Joy Koshy

20 March 2018	Ozone	0–0	Goa (R)	Bengaluru
16:00 IST				Stadium: Bangalore Football Stadium; Attendance: 1000; Referee: Rafeek Babu Mannamparambath

20 March 2018	Kerala Blasters (R)	3–2	Fateh Hyderabad	Kochi
16:00 IST	Riswanali 13'; Ananthu Murali 57'; Suraj Rawat 71'		Edmond Peprah 63'; Don Tshering Lepcha 82'	Stadium: Maharaja Ground; Attendance: 297; Referee: Maria Joseph Arokia

21 March 2018	FC Kerala	3–0	Madhya Bharat	Thrissur
16:00 IST	Shreyas V.G. 23'; Bala Alhassan Dahir 37', 86'			Stadium: Thrissur Municipal Corporation Stadium; Attendance: 1,000; Referee: Akash Jackson Routh

24 March 2018	Fateh Hyderabad	3–2	Goa (R)	Anantapur
16:15 IST	Godwin Quashiga 33'; Sushil Meitei 42'; Don Tshering Lepcha 90+3'		Liston 68'; Aaren D Silva 76'	Stadium: Anantapur Sports Village Football Ground; Attendance: 150; Referee: Radhakrishnan Kottamkurussi

25 March 2018	Kerala Blasters (R)	6–0	Madhya Bharat	Kochi
16:00 IST	Ananthu Murali 13'; Kharpan 16', 38', 53'; Samad 52', 80'			Stadium: Jawaharlal Nehru Stadium; Attendance: 1,000; Referee: Senthil Nathan S

31 March 2018	Goa (R)	0–0	FC Kerala	Margao
16:00 IST				Stadium: GMC Stadium; Attendance: 450; Referee: Rosario Fernandes

5 April 2018	Madhya Bharat	0–2	FC Kerala	Bhopal
15:30 IST			Shreyas V.G. 57'; K. Sylla 85'	Stadium: JLU Ground; Attendance: 100; Referee: Dipu Roy

5 April 2018	Fateh Hyderabad	0–0	Ozone	Anantapur
16:15 IST				Stadium: Anantapur Sports Village Football Ground; Attendance: 150; Referee: Rafeek Babu Mannamparambath

11 April 2018	Madhya Bharat	0–4	Ozone	Bhopal
15:30 IST			Sabeeth 6', 61'; Robert Ribiero 53', 75'	Stadium: JLU Ground; Attendance: 100; Referee: Umesh Bora

12 April 2018	FC Kerala	3–2	Kerala Blasters (R)	Thrissur
16:00 IST	Bala Alhassan Dahir 57'; Shreyas V.G. 62'; Abhijith EM 90+2'		Suraj Rawat 23', 28'	Stadium: Thrissur Municipal Corporation Stadium; Attendance: 4,000; Referee: Senthil Nathan S

16 April 2018	Madhya Bharat	1–5	Fateh Hyderabad	Bhopal
15:30 IST	Vinay 5'		Edmond Peprah 28'; S. Meitei 36', 47'; Lalrin Fela 87'; Hitova Ayemi 90+2'	Stadium: JLU Ground; Attendance: 100; Referee: Nasiruddin Naskar

16 April 2018	FC Kerala	0–2	Ozone	Thrissur
16:00 IST			Sabeeth 26'; Kuttymani 90+4'	Stadium: Thrissur Municipal Corporation Stadium; Attendance: 1,864; Referee: Parmanand Jaganath Mandrekar

16 April 2018	Goa (R)	0–2	Kerala Blasters (R)	Margao
16:00 IST			Samad 59', 86'	Stadium: GMC Stadium; Attendance: 80; Referee: Umesh Bora

21 April 2018	Madhya Bharat	0-3	Kerala Blasters (R)	Bhopal
15:30 IST			Samad 25', 28'; Kharpan 43'	Stadium: JLU Ground; Attendance: 40; Referee: Crystal John

21 April 2018	Goa (R)	1–4	Fateh Hyderabad	Margao
16:00 IST	Lalawmpuia 57'		S. Meitei 29'; Godwin Quashiga 44'; Hitova Ayemi 55'; Edmond Peprah 90+6'	Stadium: GMC Stadium; Attendance: 200; Referee: Sumiraj Poorathil Sudhakaran

26 April 2018	Kerala Blasters (R)	1–5	FC Kerala	Kochi
16:00 IST	Kharpan 70'		Jithin M.S. 18'; Shreyas V.G. 36', 49', 56'; Haris E.K. 90'	Stadium: Jawaharlal Nehru Stadium; Attendance: 150; Referee: R Palmson Moses Raj

26 April 2018	Ozone	7–0	Madhya Bharat	Bengaluru
16:00 IST	Robert Ribiero 28', 36', 51'; Son 47'; Sabeeth 68', 84'; Akshay Kumar Dosapati 73'			Stadium: Bangalore Football Stadium; Attendance: 100; Referee: Radhakrishnan Kottamkurussi

30 April 2018	Fateh Hyderabad	2–1	Madhya Bharat	Anantapur
16:15 IST	Hitova Ayemi 36'; Godwin Quashiga 72'		Jordan Fernandes 45+2'	Stadium: Anantapur Sports Village Football Ground; Attendance: 50; Referee: M Sugandar

30 April 2018	Ozone	1–0	FC Kerala	Bengaluru
16:00 IST	Son 47'			Stadium: Bangalore Football Stadium; Attendance: 300; Referee: Umesh Bora

1 May 2018	Kerala Blasters (R)	2–1	Goa (R)	Kochi
16:00 IST	L. Meitei 18'; Shahajas T 90+2'		Hayden Fernandes 44'	Stadium: Jawaharlal Nehru Stadium; Attendance: 150; Referee: Senthil Nathan S

4 May 2018	FC Kerala	2–1	Goa (R)	Thrissur
16:00 IST	Bala Alhassan Dahir 58'; Jithin M.S. 85'		Lalawmpuia 36'	Stadium: Thrissur Municipal Corporation Stadium; Attendance: 2,130; Referee: Khamruddin Mohammed Avez

4 May 2018	Ozone	0–0	Fateh Hyderabad	Bengaluru
16:00 IST				Stadium: Bangalore Football Stadium; Attendance: 500; Referee: Santhosh Kumar

9 May 2018	Goa (R)	1–1	Ozone	Margao
16:00 IST	Meldon Dsilva 90+2'		Robert Ribiero 82'	Stadium: GMC Stadium; Attendance: 500; Referee: Umesh Bora

10 May 2018	Fateh Hyderabad	2–4	Kerala Blasters (R)	Anantapur
16:15 IST	Hitova Ayemi 78'; Lalliansanga 90+6'		Kharpan 14', 75'; Samad 42'; Suraj Rawat 45+2'	Stadium: Anantapur Sports Village Football Ground; Attendance: 100; Referee: Maria Joseph Arokia

13 May 2018	Madhya Bharat	0–2	Goa (R)	Bhopal
15:30 IST			Colaco 62'; Lalawmpuia 90+4'	Stadium: JLU Ground; Attendance: 50; Referee: Rahul Kumar Gupta

13 May 2018	Ozone	0–1	Kerala Blasters (R)	Bengaluru
16:15 IST			Suraj Rawat 51'	Stadium: Bangalore Football Stadium; Attendance: 2,000; Referee: Senthil Nathan S

13 May 2018	Fateh Hyderabad	4–2	FC Kerala	Anantapur
16:15 IST	Hitova Ayemi 49', 87'; Imran Khan 54'; Lalrin Fela 90'		Abhijith EM 19'; Jithin M.S. 25'	Stadium: Anantapur Sports Village Football Ground; Attendance: 150; Referee: M Sugandar

=== Group C ===
Pos	Team	Pld	W	D	L	GF	GA	GD	Pts	Qualification	TRAU	BFC	LFC	JFC	MSC	CFC
1	TRAU	10	7	2	1	26	9	+17	23	Advance to Final round	—	1–2	3–1	5–0	4–1	4–0
2	Bengaluru (R) (Note: Reserves team are ineligible for advance to the next round)	10	5	2	3	19	13	+6	17		2–2	—	0–3	2–0	2–1	6–1
3	Langsning	10	4	3	3	16	9	+7	15		0–1	1–1	—	5–0	1–1	2–1
4	Jamshedpur (R)	10	3	2	5	11	22	−11	11		1–1	2–1	1–3	—	1–1	3–2
5	Mohammedan	10	3	3	4	12	13	−1	12		1–3	1–0	0–0	2–1	—	4–0
6	Chennaiyin (R)	10	2	0	8	8	26	−18	6		1–2	1–3	1–0	0–2	1–0	—

Updated to match(es) played on unknown. Source: soccerway

==== Fixtures and results ====
14 March 2018	Mohammedan	2–1	Jamshedpur (R)	Kolkata
15:15 IST	Debasish Pradhan 35'; Jiten Murmu 42'	Report	Vijay Kumar 84'	Stadium: Barasat Stadium; Attendance: 550; Referee: Prasad Rabha

14 March 2018	Langsning	2–1	Chennaiyin (R)	Shillong
15:15 IST	Lancine Toure 25'; Kitboklang Pale 83'	Report	Prosenjit Chakraborty 61'	Stadium: Jawaharlal Nehru Stadium; Attendance: 2775; Referee: Debashis Mandi

17 March 2018	Mohammedan	4–0	Chennaiyin (R)	Kolkata
15:15 IST	Prohlad Roy 25', 61'; Tirthankar Sarkar 35'; Ankit Mukherjee 75'			Stadium: Barasat Stadium; Attendance: 850; Referee: Ibungo Meetei Ningthoukhongjam

19 March 2018	Langsning	1–1	Bengaluru (R)	Shillong
16:00 IST	Kitboklang Pale 21'		Lamgoulen Hangshing 80'	Stadium: Jawaharlal Nehru Stadium; Attendance: 1,500; Referee: Shubhankar Khamri

20 March 2018	Jamshedpur (R)	1–1	TRAU	Jamshedpur
17:00 IST	Gourav Mukhi 12'		Vashum 43'	Stadium: JRD Tata Sports Complex; Attendance: 4,200; Referee: Khamruddin Mohammed Avez

23 March 2018	Jamshedpur (R)	3–2	Chennaiyin (R)	Jamshedpur
17:00 IST	Gorachand Mamdi 10'; Gourav Mukhi 38', 54'		B. Singh 23'; B Rohmingthanga 62'	Stadium: JRD Tata Sports Complex; Attendance: 6,315; Referee: M Sugandar

26 March 2018	Langsning	0–1	TRAU	Shillong
16:00 IST			Nelson Kom 44'	Stadium: Jawaharlal Nehru Stadium; Attendance: 1,800; Referee: Akash Jackson Rauth

4 April 2018	Jamshedpur (R)	1–3	Langsning	Jamshedpur
17:00 IST	Firoz Khan 40'		Stephanson Pale 3', 36'; Subham Ghosh 17' (o.g.)	Stadium: JRD Tata Sports Complex; Attendance: 8,256; Referee: Pratik Mondal

5 April 2018	TRAU	4–1	Mohammedan	Imphal
14:30 IST	M. Meitei 25', 45+1'; Princewill Emeka 74', 90+3'		Dowary 53'	Stadium: Khuman Lampak Main Stadium; Attendance: 3,100; Referee: Akask Jackson Routh

6 April 2018	Chennaiyin (R)	1–3	Bengaluru (R)	Chennai
16:00 IST	Prosenjit Chakraborty 90+2'		Kalinga 40'; Lamgoulen Hangshing 45+2'; Akhtar 87'	Stadium: SSN College Ground; Referee: Moosa Vayoli

9 April 2018	Mohammedan	0–0	Langsning	Kolkata
15:15 IST				Stadium: Barasat Stadium; Attendance: 500; Referee: Raktim Saha

11 April 2018	Bengaluru (R)	2–0	Jamshedpur (R)	Bengaluru
16:00 IST	Robinson 19'; Lamgoulen Hangshing 65'			Stadium: Bangalore Football Stadium; Referee: R Palmson Moses Raj

12 April 2018	Chennaiyin (R)	1–2	TRAU	Chennai
16:00 IST	Zonunmawia 32'		Princewill Emeka 42'; Laishram Milan Singh 53'	Stadium: SSN College Ground; Attendance: 100; Referee: Gibin Baby Kalarickal

13 April 2018	Langsning	1–1	Mohammedan	Shillong
16:00 IST	Stephanson Pale 30'		Echezona 54'	Stadium: Jawaharlal Nehru Stadium; Attendance: 1,200; Referee: Ibungo Meetei Ningthoukhongjam

15 April 2018	Chennaiyin (R)	0–2	Jamshedpur (R)	Chennai
16:00 IST			Gourav Mukhi 11'; Harsha Parui 43'	Stadium: SSN College Ground; Attendance: 20; Referee: Sumiraj Poorathil Sudhakaran

16 April 2018	Bengaluru (R)	2–2	TRAU	Bengaluru
16:00 IST	Robinson 9'; Shrivas 13'		Phalguni Singh 11'; Akhtar 58' (o.g.)	Stadium: Bangalore Football Stadium; Attendance: 200; Referee: Moosa Vayoli

21 April 2018	TRAU	1–2	Bengaluru (R)	Imphal
14:15 IST	Princewill Emeka 72'		Myron Mendes 6', 59'	Stadium: Khuman Lampak Main Stadium

21 April 2018	Chennaiyin (R)	1–0	Langsning	Chennai
16:00 IST	B. Singh 68'			Stadium: SSN College Ground; Attendance: 150; Referee: M Sugandar

21 April 2018	Jamshedpur (R)	1–1	Mohammedan	Jamshedpur
17:00 IST	Prakash Naik 4'		Cho Tshering Lepcha 5'	Stadium: JRD Tata Sports Complex; Attendance: 5,342; Referee: Srikant Bohidar

25 April 2018	Bengaluru (R)	0–3	Langsning	Bengaluru
16:00 IST			Lancine Toure 45+3'; Kitboklang Pale 89'; Brolington Warlarpih 90+5'	Stadium: Bangalore Football Stadium; Attendance: 100; Referee: C.R. Srikrishna

25 April 2018	Chennaiyin (R)	1–0	Mohammedan	Chennai
16:00 IST	Prosenjit Chakraborty 35'			Stadium: SSN College Ground; Attendance: 25; Referee: Maria Joseph Arokia

26 April 2018	TRAU	5–0	Jamshedpur (R)	Imphal
14:30 IST	Ngangbam Naocha 8'; Wahengbam Angousana 26'; L. Milan Singh 40'; Vashum 44'; Princewill Emeka 63'			Stadium: Khuman Lampak Main Stadium; Attendance: 2,000; Referee: Dipu Roy

29 April 2018	Bengaluru (R)	2–1	Mohammedan	Bengaluru
16:00 IST	Roshan 37'; Lamgoulen Hangshing 82'		Ayan 39'	Stadium: Bangalore Football Stadium; Attendance: 250; Referee: Maria Joseph Arokia

1 May 2018	Langsning	5–0	Jamshedpur (R)	Shillong
16:00 IST	Kitboklang Pale 8', 45+2', 65'; Dibinroy Nongspung 58'; Donborlang Nongkynrih 89'			Stadium: Jawaharlal Nehru Stadium; Attendance: 1,000; Referee: Prasad Rabha

5 May 2018	Mohammedan	1–3	TRAU	Kolkata
15:15 IST	Rahul Jaiswal 90'		Meitei 41'; Princewell Emeka 49'; Ngangbam Naocha 89'	Stadium: Barasat Stadium; Attendance: 350; Referee: Om Prakash Thakur

5 May 2018	Bengaluru (R)	6–1	Chennaiyin (R)	Bengaluru
16:00 IST	Parag Shrivas 4', 43', 68'; Lalengzama Vangchhia 49'; Roshan 55'; Lalrintluanga Chawnglut 57'		Prosenjit Chakraborty 77'	Stadium: Bangalore Football Stadium; Attendance: 500; Referee: Gibin Baby Kalarickal

9 May 2018	TRAU	4–0	Chennaiyin (R)	Imphal
14:30 IST	Vashum 19'; Soraisam Sandeep 80'; Meitei 81'; Ronald 87'			Stadium: Khuman Lampak Main Stadium; Attendance: 1,200; Referee: Pratik Mondal

9 May 2018	Jamshedpur (R)	2–1	Bengaluru (R)	Jamshedpur
17:00 IST	Gourav Mukhi 71', 85'		Lalrintluanga Chawnglut 74'	Stadium: JRD Tata Sports Complex; Attendance: 1,000; Referee: Debashis Mandi

13 May 2018	TRAU	3–1	Langsning	Imphal
14:30 IST	Ngangbam Naocha 34', 49'; Vashum 59'		Kitboklang Pale 90'	Stadium: Khuman Lampak Main Stadium; Attendance: 3,000; Referee: Ranjit Bakshi

13 May 2018	Mohammedan	1–0	Bengaluru (R)	Kolkata
15:15 IST	Dowary 70'			Stadium: Barasat Stadium; Referee: Rabichandra Singh Irengbam

== Final round ==
Pos	Team	Pld	W	D	L	GF	GA	GD	Pts	Qualification
1	Real Kashmir (C)	3	2	1	0	8	6	+2	7	Promotion to 2018–19 I-League
2	Hindustan	3	1	1	1	5	5	0	4	
3	Ozone	3	0	2	1	4	5	−1	2	
4	TRAU	3	0	2	1	2	3	−1	2	

Source: I-league
(C) Champions

=== Fixtures and results ===
24 May 2018	Hindustan	1–0	TRAU	Bengaluru
13:30 IST	Tushar Chaudhary 90+7'			Stadium: FSV Arena; Referee: Crystal John

24 May 2018	Ozone	2–3	Real Kashmir	Bengaluru
17:45 IST	Robert Ribiero 26'; Sabeeth 67'		N. Bhutia 39'; Ritwik Kumar Das 89'; Kouassi Yao 90+5'	Stadium: FSV Arena; Attendance: 500; Referee: Tejas Nagvenkar

27 May 2018	Ozone	2–2	Hindustan	Bengaluru
13:30 IST	Sabeeth 3'; Robert Ribiero 82'		Kushant Chauhan 5'; Ashutosh Thapliyal 57'	Stadium: FSV Arena; Attendance: 300; Referee: Debashis Mandi

27 May 2018	Real Kashmir	2–2	TRAU	Bengaluru
17:45 IST	Ritwik Kumar Das 38'; Prem Singh 90+1' (o.g.)		Princewill Emeka 62'; Wahengbam Angousana 88'	Stadium: FSV Arena; Attendance: 500; Referee: Rahul Kumar Gupta

30 May 2018	TRAU	0–0	Ozone	Bengaluru
13:30 IST				Stadium: FSV Arena; Referee: Raktim Saha

30 May 2018	Real Kashmir	3–2	Hindustan	Bengaluru
17:45 IST	Ifham Tariq Mir 22'; Danish Farooq 40'; N. Bhutia 67'		Kushant Chauhan 34', 80'	Stadium: FSV Arena; Attendance: 400; Referee: Tejas Nagvenkar

== Season statistics ==
=== Top scorers ===
Rank	Player	Club	Goals
1	(Brazil) Robert D‘Souza Ribiero	Ozone	10
2	(India) C. S. Sabeeth	Ozone	9
3	(India) Aakif Javaid	Lonestar Kashmir	7
3	(India) Shaiborlang Kharpan	Kerala Blasters (R)	7
3	(India) Sahal Abdul Samad	Kerala Blasters (R)	7
3	(India) Kitboklang Pale	Langsning	7
3	(Nigeria) Princewill Emeka	TRAU	7
8	(India) Shreyas VG	Kerala	6
8	(India) Gourav Mukhi	Jamshedpur (R)	6
8	(India) Hitova Ayemi	Fateh Hyderabad	6
8	(India) Kushant Chauhan	Hindustan	6

=== Clean sheets ===
Rank	Player	Club	Clean sheets
1	(India) Mithun Samanto	Hindustan	7
1	(India) Abhishek Das	Ozone	7
3	(India) Anuj Kumar	Pune City (R)	6
4	(India) Sukhwinder Singh	Real Kashmir	5
5	(India) Royal Basumatary	Delhi United	4
6	(India) Ahamad Afsar	Kerala	3
6	(India) Shayon Roy	Delhi Dynamos (R)	3
6	(India) Surjay Kumar Pariyar	Langsning	3
6	(India) Tajuddin	TRAU	3
6	(India) Avjit Kar	Kerala Blasters (R)	3
6	(India) Mohammed Nawaz	Goa (R)	3

=== Highest Attendances ===
Rank	Home team	Score	Away team	Attendance	Date	Stadium
1	Jamshedpur (R)	1–3	Langsning	8,256	4 April 2018	JRD Tata Sports Complex
2	Jamshedpur (R)	3–2	Chennaiyin (R)	6,315	23 March 2018	JRD Tata Sports Complex
3	Real Kashmir	0–0	Pune City (R)	5,992	21 March 2018	TRC Turf Ground
4	Jamshedpur (R)	1–1	Mohammedan	5,342	21 April 2018	JRD Tata Sports Complex
5	Jamshedpur (R)	1–1	TRAU	4,200	20 March 2018	JRD Tata Sports Complex
6	Kerala	3–2	Kerala Blasters (R)	4,000	12 April 2018	Corporation Stadium
7	TRAU	1–2	Bengaluru (R)	3,500	21 April 2018	Khuman Lampak Main Stadium
8	TRAU	4–1	Mohammedan	3,100	5 April 2018	Khuman Lampak Main Stadium
9	Lonestar Kashmir	0–1	Delhi Dynamos (R)	3,000	20 March 2018	TRC Turf Ground
10	TRAU	3–1	Langsning	3,000	13 May 2018	Khuman Lampak Main Stadium
