= 2016–17 I-League 2nd Division final round =

Tournament details
- Country: India
- Teams: 6

Final positions
- Champions: NEROCA
- Runners-up: Southern Samity

Tournament statistics
- Matches played: 29
- Goals scored: 79 (2.72 per match)
- All statistics correct as of 28 May 2017.

The 2016–17 I-League 2nd Division final round was the final round of 2016–17 I-League 2nd Division. Manipur team NEROCA won the title and promoted to I-League.

== Teams ==
Locations of the 2016–17 I-League teams 2nd Division final round

=== Stadiums and locations ===
Note: Table lists in alphabetical order.

Team	Location	Stadium	Capacity
Delhi United	New Delhi, Delhi	Ambedkar Stadium	10,000
Fateh Hyderabad	Hyderabad, Telangana	Gachibowli Athletic Stadium	30,000
Kenkre	Mumbai, Maharastra	Cooperage Ground	5,000
Lonestar Kashmir	Srinagar, Jammu and Kashmir	TRC Turf Ground	15,000
NEROCA	Imphal, Manipur	Khuman Lampak Main Stadium	30,000
Southern Samity	Kolkata, West Bengal	Barasat Stadium	22,000

== Table ==
Pos	Team	Pld	W	D	L	GF	GA	GD	Pts	Qualification
1	NEROCA (C)	10	8	2	0	23	4	+19	26	Promotion to the I-League
2	Southern Samity	10	5	2	3	16	15	+1	17	
3	Delhi United	9	3	3	3	12	16	−4	12	
4	Fateh Hyderabad	10	2	5	3	9	9	0	11	
5	Lonestar Kashmir	9	1	3	5	8	13	−5	6	
6	Kenkre	10	1	3	6	11	20	−9	6	

Source: I-league
(C) Champions

== Fixtures and results ==
7 April 2017	Southern Samity	1–1	NEROCA	Kolkata
15:00 IST	Odafa 72'	Report	Ejiogu Chinedu Emmanuel 74'	Stadium: Barasat Stadium; Attendance: 200; Referee: Om Prakash Thakur

8 April 2017	Fateh Hyderabad	0–0	Lonestar Kashmir	Hyderabad
16:00 IST		Report		Stadium: Gachibowli Athletic Stadium; Attendance: 400; Referee: Rakthim Saha

9 April 2017	Kenkre	2–2	Delhi United	Mumbai
16:00 IST	Kouassi Yao 45+1', 61'	Report	Pawan Kumar 54'; Zenithgenius Mashangva 68'	Stadium: Cooperage Ground; Attendance: 75; Referee: Senthilnathan S

12 April 2017	Kenkre	0–1	NEROCA	Mumbai
16:00 IST		Report	Felix 66'	Stadium: Cooperage Ground; Attendance: 200; Referee: R Palmson Moses Raj

12 April 2017	Fateh Hyderabad	0–1	Delhi United	Hyderabad
16:00 IST		Report	Stephen Harry Emeneka 76'	Stadium: Gachibowli Athletic Stadium; Attendance: 100; Referee: Vikram Rajkumar

13 April 2017	Southern Samity	1–0	Lonestar Kashmir	Kolkata
15:00 IST	Ronald Singh 58'	Report		Stadium: Barasat Stadium; Attendance: 200; Referee: Priyobarta Singh Langpoklakpam

16 April 2017	Fateh Hyderabad	0–0	NEROCA	Hyderabad
16:00 IST		Report		Stadium: Gachibowli Athletic Stadium; Attendance: 500; Referee: Fasil Salahudeen

17 April 2017	Southern Samity	1–0	Delhi United	Kolkata
15:00 IST	Odafa 53'	Report		Stadium: Barasat Stadium; Attendance: 150; Referee: Rabichandra Singh Irengbam

18 April 2017	Kenkre	1–1	Lonestar Kashmir	Mumbai
19:30 IST	Sampath Kuttymani 27'	Report	Alexandre Tabillon 11'	Stadium: Cooperage Ground; Attendance: 120; Referee: Umesh Bora

21 April 2017	NEROCA	5–0	Delhi United	Imphal
14:30 IST	Subhash Singh 22'; Felix 31', 38'; Kallon 84'; David Lalbiakzara 90'	Report		Stadium: Khuman Lampak Stadium; Attendance: 4000; Referee: Pratik Mondal

22 April 2017	Kenkre	2–0	Southern Samity	Mumbai
19:30 IST	Deepak Tirkey 43'; Rohit Mirza 53'	Report		Stadium: Cooperage Ground; Attendance: 100; Referee: Jibon Chandra Gogoi

25 April 2017	Lonestar Kashmir	0–1	Fateh Hyderabad	Shrinagar
11:00 IST		Report	Luis Santos 44'	Stadium: TRC Turf Ground; Attendance: 400; Referee: Akash Jackson Routh

29 April 2017	NEROCA	2–0	Kenkre	Imphal
14:30 IST	Felix 30'; Malemngamba Meetei 32'	Report		Stadium: Khuman Lampak Stadium; Attendance: 7000; Referee: Pratik Mondal

29 April 2017	Fateh Hyderabad	1–3	Southern Samity	Hyderabad
17:15 IST	Jaybrata Dhar 32'	Report	Odafa 20', 40'; Ashim Biswas 50'	Stadium: Gachibowli Athletic Stadium; Attendance: 400; Referee: R Palmson Moses Raj

30 April 2017	Delhi United	1–1	Lonestar Kashmir	Delhi
16:00 IST	Zenith 56'	Report	Mumtaz Akhtar 90'	Stadium: Ambedkar Stadium; Attendance: 50; Referee: Raktim Saha

4 May 2017	Southern Samity	3–1	Kenkre	Kolkata
15:00 IST	Kalu ogba 19'; Shylo 32'; Odafa 37'	Report	Kuttymani 51'	Stadium: Barasat Stadium; Attendance: 200; Referee: Priyobrata Singh

4 May 2017	Delhi United	1–1	Fateh Hyderabad	Delhi
12:00 IST	Don Lepcha 43'	Report	Jagne 45+3'	Stadium: Ambedkar Stadium; Attendance: 200; Referee: Crystal John

6 May 2017	NEROCA	1–0	Lonestar Kashmir	Imphal
14:30 IST	Thangjam 85'	Report		Stadium: Khuman Lampak Stadium; Attendance: 7000; Referee: Debashis Mandi

9 May 2017	Fateh Hyderabad	1–0	Kenkre	Hyderabad
19:00 IST	Jagne 25'	Report		Stadium: Gachibowli Athletic Stadium; Attendance: 500; Referee: Umesh Bora

14 May 2017	NEROCA	2–1	Fateh Hyderabad	Imphal
14:30 IST	Thangjam 18'; Subhash 55'	Report	Hakku 8'	Stadium: Khuman Lampak Stadium; Attendance: 11000; Referee: Fasil Salahudeen

14 May 2017	Lonestar Kashmir	2–3	Southern Samity	Shrinagar
15:30 IST	Aakif Javaid 59'; Ifham Tariq Mir 61'	Report	Odafa 65', 74'; Basanta 90+2'	Stadium: TRC Turf Ground; Attendance: 900; Referee: Senthilnathan S

17 May 2017	Lonestar Kashmir	3–1	Kenkre	Shrinagar
15:30 IST	Arun Nagial 51' Shahnawaz Bashir 75' Alexandre Tabillon 78'	Report	Keita 45'	Stadium: TRC Turf Ground; Attendance: 500; Referee: R Palmson Moses Raj

17 May 2017	Delhi United	3–2	Southern Samity	Delhi
16:00 IST	Stephen Harry 23', 51' (pen.); Hamidullah Nesar Ahmed 34'	Report	Shylo 66'; Odafa 69'	Stadium: Ambedkar Stadium; Attendance: 150; Referee: Parmanand Jagannath Mandrekar

19 May 2017	Delhi United	0–3	NEROCA	Delhi
16:00 IST		Report	Subhash 36', 56'; Pritham 46'	Stadium: Ambedkar Stadium; Attendance: 700; Referee: Om Prakash Thakur

22 May 2017	Lonestar Kashmir	1–4	NEROCA	Shrinagar
15:30 IST	Waris Amin 77'	Report	Felix 32', 46', 55'; Subhash 61'	Stadium: TRC Turf Ground; Attendance: 200; Referee: Umesh Bora

22 May 2017	Delhi United	4–1	Kenkre	Delhi
16:00 IST	Stephen Harry 37', 52'; Hamidullah Nesar Ahmed 40'; G.Thakur 37', 59'	Report	Rohit Mirza 45+2'	Stadium: Ambedkar Stadium; Attendance: 118; Referee: Thanmoy Dhar

22 May 2017	Southern Samity	1–1	Fateh Hyderabad	Kolkata
17:00 IST	Odafa 88'	Report	Jagne 21'	Stadium: Barasat Stadium; Attendance: 350; Referee: Ajithkumar Meithei Lairenglakpam

28 May 2017	NEROCA	4–1	Southern Samity	Imphal
14:30 IST	Pritham 25', 36'; Subhash 57'; Felix 61'	Report	A.Biswas 9'	Stadium: Khuman Lampak Stadium; Attendance: 12000; Referee: Om Prakash Thakur

28 May 2017	Lonestar Kashmir	cancelled	Delhi United	Shrinagar
15:30 IST				Stadium: TRC Turf Ground

28 May 2017	Kenkre	3–3	Fateh Hyderabad	Mumbai
16:00 IST	S.Kuttymani 44'; Yogesh Kadam 58'; Kieta 90+5'	Report	Bonison Singh 26'; Jagne 28'; A.Gonsalves 49'	Stadium: Cooperage Ground; Attendance: 100; Referee: Tejas Vishwasrao Nagvenkar

== See also ==
- 2016–17 I-League
- 2016–17 I-League 2nd Division
- 2016–17 I-League U18 Final Round
