= Kunzang Bhutia =

Indian footballer

Personal information
- Full name: Kunzang Bhutia
- Date of birth: 3 January 1994 (age 32)
- Place of birth: Lachung, Sikkim
- Height: 1.88 m (6 ft 2 in)
- Position: Goalkeeper

Team information
- Current team: Bengaluru United
- Number: 1

Youth career
- Sports Authority of India
- Royal Wahingdoh

Senior career*
Years	Team	Apps	(Gls)
2013–2016	Shillong Lajong	6	(0)
2014	→ NorthEast United (loan)	0	(0)
2015	→ Atlético de Kolkata (loan)	0	(0)
2016	Tollygunge Agragami		
2016–2017	Fateh Hyderabad	5	(0)
2017–2018	ATK	0	(0)
2018–2019	Churchill Brothers	2	(0)
2020	Hyderabad FC	0	(0)
2020–	Bengaluru United	8	(0)
- * Club domestic league appearances and goals

Kunzang Bhutia (born 3 January 1994) is an Indian professional footballer who currently plays as a goalkeeper for Bengaluru United.

== Youth career ==
Born in Lachung, Sikkim, Bhutia was inspired by his uncle and aunt to play football. He started playing the game as a defender before being converted into a goalkeeper. He led the Sikkim under-16 side during the junior nationals in Goa. He then joined the Sports Authority of India and played matches for the academy in Delhi before joining the youth side at Royal Wahingdoh. Bhutia then represented his state of Sikkim in the 2010 Santosh Trophy at the age of 17.

== Career ==
=== Shillong Lajong ===
Bhutia joined Shillong Lajong in 2013. After returning from loan, Bhutia made his professional debut for Shillong Lajong in the I-League on 28 March 2015 against Sporting Goa. He came on in the 52nd minute for forward, David Ngaihte, after Shillong's starting goalkeeper, Vishal Kaith, was sent off. Bhutia went on to play the rest of the match and not concede as Shillong Lajong drew the match 1–1.

==== Northeast United (loan) ====
Despite not playing a single match in the I-League for Shillong Lajong, Bhutia was signed on loan by NorthEast United of the Indian Super League. After the season,

==== Atlético de Kolkata. (loan) ====
After the season, Bhutia went out on loan again in the Indian Super League, this time to Atlético de Kolkata.

=== Tollygunge Agragami ===
After returning from loan and playing the 2015–16 season with Shillong Lajong, Bhutia signed with Calcutta Football League side Tollygunge Agragami.

=== Fateh Hyderabad ===
In November 2016, Bhutia signed with I-League 2nd Division side Fateh Hyderabad. He made his debut for the side in their season opener against Pride Sports on 21 January 2017. He started the match and kept the clean sheet as Fateh Hyderabad won 2–0.

=== ATK ===
In July 2017, Bhutia was drafted by Indian Super League franchise ATK, where he didn't play a single game.

=== Churchill Brothers ===
In July 2018 Bhutia signed with I-League side Churchill Brothers

== Career statistics ==
As of 22 April 2018

Club	Season	League			League Cup		Domestic Cup		Continental		Total	
Club	Season	Division	Apps	Goals	Apps	Goals	Apps	Goals	Apps	Goals	Apps	Goals
Shillong Lajong	2014–15	I-League	5	0	—	—	—	—	—	—	5	0
Shillong Lajong	2015–15	I-League	1	0	—	—	—	—	—	—	1	0
Shillong Lajong	Total		6	0	0	0	0	0	0	0	6	0
NorthEast United (loan)	2014	Indian Super League	0	0	—	—	—	—	—	—	0	0
Atlético de Kolkata (loan)	2015	Indian Super League	0	0	—	—	—	—	—	—	0	0
Fateh Hyderabad	2016–17	I-League 2nd Division	5	0	—	—	—	—	—	—	5	0
ATK	2017–18	Indian Super League	0	0	—	—	—	—	—	—	0	0
Career total			11	0	0	0	0	0	0	0	11	0
