= Bedashwor Singh Laishram =

Indian footballer

Bedashwor Singh
Personal information
- Full name: Bedashwor Singh Laishram
- Date of birth: 31 December 1998 (age 27)
- Place of birth: Manipur, India
- Height: 1.74 m (5 ft 8 1/2 in)
- Position: Midfielder

Youth career
- 2012–2016: AIFF Elite Academy

Senior career*
Years	Team	Apps	(Gls)
2016	Chennaiyin	0	(0)
2017	→ Minerva Punjab (loan)		
2018–2019	Chennaiyin B	11	(2)
2019	→ Fateh Hyderabad (loan)	6	(1)
2019–2021	TRAU	9	(0)
2021-2023	Bengaluru United	17	(0)
2023	Mohammedan		

International career
2013	India U17		
2015	India U20		
- * Club domestic league appearances and goals

Bedashwor Singh Laishram (Meitei: Laishram Bedashwor Singh, born 31 January 1998) is an Indian professional footballer who plays as a midfielder.

== Career ==
Born in Manipur, to a Hindu Meitei family. Singh was with the AIFF Elite Academy before being part of a group of five players from the academy to train in France with Metz. On 18 May 2016, Singh, along with the other four players in France, signed with Chennaiyin of the Indian Super League. For the 2016 season, Singh was listed as a developmental player for Chennaiyin.

=== Minerva Punjab ===
After the Indian Super League season ended, Singh was loaned out to I-League side Minerva Punjab for the 2016–17 season. He made his professional debut for the club on 15 February 2017 against DSK Shivajians. He started the match and played 35 minutes before coming off.

=== Chennaiyin B ===
On 13 January 2018, Singh started for Chennaiyin B, Chennaiyin's reserve team, in the Don Bosco - Fr. McFerran Trophy All India Football Tournament against ICF. He scored the first goal for Chennaiyin B in their 1–0 victory.

=== Fateh Hyderabad AFC ===
On 20 January 2019, Singh was again loaned out to I-League 2nd Division side Fateh Hyderabad. He has scored a goal against South United on 25 January at FSV arena.

=== TRAU ===
On 1 July 2019, Singh moved to TRAU, where he played for around two years.

=== FC Bengaluru United ===
He joined I-League 2nd Division club Bengaluru United on 31 August 2021. His team finished fourth in the final round of I-League 2nd Division and failed to qualify for the 2023-24 I-League.

=== Mohammedan SC ===
He moved to Kolkata-based I-League club Mohammedan in 2023-24 session.

== International ==
Singh was scouted into the AIFF Elite Academy and India national youth teams in 2012.

== Career statistics ==
As of 25 July 2023

Club	Season	League			Cup		Continental		Total	
Club	Season	Division	Apps	Goals	Apps	Goals	Apps	Goals	Apps	Goals
Minerva Punjab	2016–17	I-League	1	0	—	—	—	—	1	0
Chennaiyin B	2017–18	I-League 2nd Division	11	2	—	—	—	—	11	2
Fateh Hyderabad AFC	2018–19	I-League 2nd Division	6	1	—	—	—	—	6	1
Mohammedan SC	2023–24	I-League	0	0	—	—	—	—	0	0
Career total			18	3	0	0	0	0	18	3
