= Madhya Bharat SC =

Former Indian association football club

Madhya Bharat
- Full name: Madhya Bharat Sports Club
- Nickname: The Yoddhas
- Founded: 2017; 9 years ago
- Ground: Tatya Tope Nagar Sports Complex
- Capacity: 20,000
- CEO: Rishish Dubey
Home colours	Away colours

Madhya Bharat Sports Club was an Indian professional football club based in Bhopal, Madhya Pradesh. The club last competed in the I-League 2nd Division, the second tier of Indian football league system. They also played in the Madhya Pradesh Premier League.

== History ==
Madhya Bharat Sports Club was founded in 2017 in collaboration with Celtic F.C. Academy. The club along with Pride Sports FC emerged as the two existing semi-professional clubs in the Indian state of Madhya Pradesh. In 2017, they roped in their first foreign coach José Carlos Hevia from Spain and began the pre-season journey with comfortable win against Hazrat Nizamuddin FC. The 2017–18 season, was disastrous for them as they bowed out from group B, without a single win.

On 21 August 2018, All India Football Federation announced that Madhya Bharat will participate in 2018–19 I-League 2nd Division, but they later withdrew.

== Stadium ==
Madhya Bharat played most of their home matches at the Tatya Tope Nagar Sports Complex in Bhopal, which has a seating capacity of 20,000 spectators.

== Kit manufacturers and shirt sponsors ==
Period	Kit manufacturer	Shirt sponsor
2017	Cosco	AMG
2018	Cosco	D B Corp Ltd.

== Last registered staff ==
Position	Name
Head coach / Technical director	(Spain) José Carlos Hevia
Assistant coach	(India) Amit Rana
Phsio	(India) Neeraj Mahorekar
Team manager	(India) Utkarsh Kaithwas

== Coaching history ==
updated on 28 May 2017

Name	Nationality	From	To	P	W	D	L	GF	GA	Win%
José Carlos Hevia	Spain	2017	2018	10	0	0	10	3	39	0.00

== Team records ==
=== Seasons ===
As of 29 April 2018

Year	Division	League								Federation Cup
Year	Division	Pos.	P	W	D	L	GF	GA	Pts	Federation Cup
2017–18	I-League 2nd Division	Group Stage	10	0	0	10	3	39	0	—

== Partnership ==
Madhya Bharat Sports Club has joined the Celtic Football Academy's international partnership programme in a long-term agreement for boosting the football academy and implementing football development model in Bhopal.

According to the official statements from both sides, partnership followed Celtic's previous successful relationships in India with both Mahindra United FC and two-time national league champions, Salgaocar FC.

== Affiliated clubs ==
The following club is currently affiliated with Madhya Bharat FC:

- (Scotland) Celtic FC (2017–present)

== Notable players ==
- (Bhutan) Tshering Dorji (2018–2019)

== See also ==
- Pride Sports FC
- List of football clubs in India
