= Tiago Lopes (sports executive) =

Portuguese football executive

Tiago João Sousa de Almeida Lopes is a Portuguese football executive with experience in the management and administration of professional clubs. He currently serves as CEO of Casa Pia Atlético Clube, a Primeira Liga side in Portugal.

== Career ==
His professional career in football began with Manchester United, where he worked as a technical consultant before joining the club’s Portuguese Soccer School operation. In 2010, he expanded his involvement in football development by helping establish the Bhaichung Bhutia Football Schools in India, in partnership with the former Indian international. His career then took him to the United States, where, in 2013, he was appointed president of the Harrisburg City Islanders, taking an active role in the club’s administration and long-term development.

In 2017, he joined Benfica’s executive structure as Chief Business Officer. Since 2020, he has led Casa Pia as CEO, overseeing the club during its return to Portugal’s top flight in 2022, following an 83-year absence. In 2024, he was reportedly considered by Saudi Arabia’s Public Investment Fund (PIF) as a potential candidate to join the management team of one of the clubs within its portfolio.

In July 2026, US-based Krause Group acquired a majority stake in Casa Pia, replacing Robert Platek as the club’s main shareholder in a transaction spearheaded by Tiago Lopes.

Under his management, Casa Pia have already generated more than €30 million in transfer fees, with some of the most significant deals including Renato Nhaga's move to Galatasaray for €6.5 million, Ruben Kluivert's transfer to Lyon for €3.7 million, and Clayton Silva and Nuno Moreira's moves to Vasco da Gama, botth for €3.5 million.
