= 2016–17 I-League 2nd Division =

10th season of the I-League 2nd Division

I-League 2nd Division
- Season: 2016–17
- Champions: NEROCA
- Promoted: NEROCA
- Matches: 65
- Goals: 160 (2.46 per match)
- Top goalscorer: Odafa Okolie; Felix Chidi Odili; 9 goals

The 2016–17 I-League 2nd Division was the tenth season of the I-League 2nd Division, the second-tier Indian league for association football clubs, since its establishment in 2008. The season began on 21 January 2017 and featured 12 teams which was divided into three groups of four teams each. NEROCA won the title and secured the promotion to I-League. 12 teams participated in the league.

== Teams ==
Locations of the 2016–17 I-League teams 2nd Division

=== Stadiums and locations ===
Note: Table lists in alphabetical order.

| Team | Location | Stadium | Capacity |
|---|---|---|---|
| Delhi United | New Delhi, Delhi | Ambedkar Stadium | 20,000 |
| Fateh Hyderabad | Hyderabad, Telangana | Gachibowli Athletic Stadium | 30,000 |
| Hindustan | New Delhi, Delhi | Thyagaraj Sports Complex | 5,000 |
| Kenkre | Mumbai, Maharastra | Cooperage Ground | 5,000 |
| Lonestar Kashmir | Srinagar, Jammu and Kashmir | Polo Ground | 10,000 |
| Mohammedan | Kolkata, West Bengal | Mohammedan Sporting Ground | 15,000 |
| NEROCA | Imphal, Manipur | Khuman Lampak Main Stadium | 30,000 |
| Ozone | Bangalore, Karnataka | Bangalore Football Stadium | 8,400 |
| Pride Sports | Jabalpur, Madhya Pradesh | Dr. Rajendra Prasad Football Stadium | 10,000 |
| Real Kashmir | Srinagar, Jammu and Kashmir | Bakshi Stadium | 30,000 |
| Southern Samity | Kolkata, West Bengal | Barasat Stadium | 22,000 |
| Sudeva Moonlight | New Delhi, Delhi | Ambedkar Stadium | 20,000 |

=== Personnel and kits ===
| Team | Manager | Kit manufacturer | Shirt sponsor |
|---|---|---|---|
| Delhi United | (Brazil) Clebson Duarte Da Silva | Nivia | Aakash Healthcare |
| Fateh Hyderabad | (India) ES Shyam | T10 Sports | None |
| Hindustan | (India) Abhijoy basu | Cosco | Hero |
| Kenkre | (India) Ekendra Singh | Cosco | Customers |
| Lonestar Kashmir | (India) Fahd Khan | None | Lonestar |
| Mohammedan | (India) Ranjan Chowdhury | Kaizen Sports | None |
| NEROCA | (India) Gift Raikhan | None | Classic group of hotels |
| Ozone | (Netherlands) Bert Zuurman | None | Ozone Group |
| Pride Sports | (Portugal) Paulo Pedro | None | None |
| Real Kashmir | (Scotland) David Robertson | None | Mentor |
| Southern Samity | (India) Amit Sen | None | None |
| Sudeva Moonlight | (England) Carlton Chapman | None | United Nations |

=== Foreign players ===
Restricting the number of foreign players strictly to three per team. A team could use two foreign players on the field each game.

| Club | Player 1 | Player 2 | Player 3 | Released |
|---|---|---|---|---|
| Delhi United | (Nigeria) Stephen Harry | (Nigeria) Chibueze Jonathon | (Afghanistan) Hamidullah Nesar Ahmed | (Nigeria) Mohammed Adeola Hassan |
| Fateh Hyderabad | (England) Adam Mitter | (Portugal) Luis Carlos Santos | (The Gambia) Saihou Jagne | (Brazil) Bruno Bryan |
| Hindustan | (Nigeria) Adehin Nelson | — | — | — |
| Kenkre | (Ivory Coast) Yao Kouassi Bernard | (Guinea) Boubacar Keita | (Liberia) Korhena A Boakai | (United States) Spenser Johnson |
| Lonestar Kashmir | (Ivory Coast) Lancine Toure (Note: After the preliminary round Lacine Toure joined Lonestar Kashmir from Mohammedan) | (France) Alexandre Tabillon (Note: After the preliminary round Tabillon joined Lonestar Kashmir from Mohammedan) | — | |
| Mohammedan | (Ivory Coast) Leonce Dodoz | (Ivory Coast) Lancine Toure | (France) Alexandre Tabillon | — |
| NEROCA | (Liberia) Varney Kallon | (Nigeria) Emmanuel Chinedu | (Nigeria) Felix Chidi Odili | — |
| Ozone | (Trinidad and Tobago) Cornell Glen | (Nigeria) Chika Wali | (Honduras) Roby Norales | — |
| Pride Sports | — | — | — | — |
| Real Kashmir | (Senegal) Lamine Tamba | (Ivory Coast) Lago Bei | — | — |
| Southern Samity | (Nigeria) Ogba Kalu Nnanna | (Nigeria) Agwu Richard | (Nigeria) Odafa Okolie | (Nigeria) Daniel Bedemi |
| Sudeva Moonlight | (Haiti) Peterson Joseph | (Australia) Jason Starr | — | — |

== Preliminary round ==
Tiebreakers
The teams are ranked according to points (3 points for a win, 1 point for a draw, 0 points for a loss). If two or more teams are equal on points on completion of the group matches, the following criteria are applied in the order given to determine the rankings:
1. Greater number of points obtained in the matches between the Teams concerned
2. Goal difference resulting from the matches between the Teams concerned
3. Greater number of goals scored in the matches between the Teams concerned
4. Goal difference in all the matches
5. Greater number of goals scored in all the matches
6. Drawing of lots

=== Group A ===
| Pos | Team | Pld | W | D | L | GF | GA | GD | Pts | Qualification or relegation |
|---|---|---|---|---|---|---|---|---|---|---|
| 1 | Lonestar Kashmir | 6 | 3 | 1 | 2 | 6 | 3 | +3 | 10 | Qualification to Final Round |
| 2 | Delhi United | 6 | 2 | 3 | 1 | 5 | 4 | +1 | 9 | Qualification to Final Round |
| 3 | Real Kashmir | 6 | 3 | 0 | 3 | 7 | 8 | −1 | 9 | |
| 4 | Sudeva Moonlight | 6 | 1 | 2 | 3 | 6 | 9 | −3 | 5 | |

Source: i-league.org

==== Fixtures and results ====
| 28 January 2017 | Delhi United | 2–0 | Real Kashmir | Delhi |
| 17:30 IST | Stephen Harry 39'; Thopi 68' | Report | | Stadium: Ambedkar Stadium; Attendance: 250; Referee: R. Palmson Moses Raj |

| 29 January 2017 | Sudeva Moonlight | 0–2 | Lonestar Kashmir | Delhi |
| 15:00 IST | | Report | Bilal Ahmad 24'; Aakif Javed 89' | Stadium: Ambedkar Stadium; Attendance: 250; Referee: Senthil Nathan S. |

| 2 February 2017 | Delhi United | 0–0 | Lonestar Kashmir | Delhi |
| 17:30 IST | | Report | | Stadium: Ambedkar Stadium; Attendance: 200; Referee: Akash Jackson Routh |

| 4 February 2017 | Sudeva Moonlight | 4–3 | Real Kashmir | Delhi |
| 15:00 IST | Syed Shoaib Ahmed 33', 73'; Franko Paul 45'; Konthoujam James Singh 76' (o.g.) | Report | Prem Kumar 8', 89'; Lago Dogbo Bei 46' | Stadium: Ambedkar Stadium; Attendance: 100; Referee: Gibin Baby Kalarickal |

| 8 February 2017 | Delhi United | 0–0 | Sudeva Moonlight | Delhi |
| 19:00 IST | | Report | | Stadium: Ambedkar Stadium; Attendance: 500; Referee: Williams Joy Koshy |

| 12 February 2017 | Sudeva Moonlight | 1–1 | Delhi United | Delhi |
| 15:00 IST | Gopi Kannan 86' | Report | Stephen Harry 21' | Stadium: Ambedkar Stadium; Attendance: 200; Referee: Rahul Kumar Gupta |

| 18 February 2017 | Lonestar Kashmir | 0–1 | Real Kashmir | Srinagar |
| 14:15 IST | | Report | Lago Dogbo Bei 67' | Stadium: Synthetic Turf Ground; Attendance: 500; Referee: Akash Jackson Routh |

| 22 February 2017 | Real Kashmir | 1–0 | Lonestar Kashmir | Srinagar |
| 14:15 IST | Lago Dogbo Bei 75' | Report | | Stadium: Synthetic Turf Ground; Attendance: 800; Referee: Paramanand Jaganath Mandrekar |

| 2 March 2017 | Real Kashmir | 1–0 | Sudeva Moonlight | Delhi |
| 11:00 IST | Prem Singh 66' | Report | | Stadium: Ambedkar Stadium; Attendance: 500; Referee: Rosario Fernandez |

| 2 March 2017 | Lonestar Kashmir | 2–0 | Delhi United | Delhi |
| 15:00 IST | Aakif Javaid 24', 90' | Report | | Stadium: Ambedkar Stadium; Attendance: 500; Referee: PRIYOBARTA SINGH LANGPOKLAKPAM |

| 4 March 2017 | Real Kashmir | 1–2 | Delhi United | Delhi |
| 15:00 IST | Lago Dogbo Bei 90+1' | Report | Zenithgenius Mashangva 24'; Stephen Harry Emeneka 45+2' | Stadium: Ambedkar Stadium; Attendance: 500; Referee: Tanmoy Dhar |

| 4 March 2017 | Lonestar Kashmir | 2–1 | Sudeva Moonlight | Delhi |
| 15:00 IST | Aakif Javaid 58'; Harpreet Singh 63' (pen.) | Report | Johny Muanpuia 68' | Stadium: Sudeva Football Ground; Attendance: 50; Referee: Rabichandra Singh Irengbam |

=== Group B ===
| Pos | Team | Pld | W | D | L | GF | GA | GD | Pts | Qualification or relegation |
|---|---|---|---|---|---|---|---|---|---|---|
| 1 | NEROCA | 6 | 4 | 1 | 1 | 5 | 3 | +2 | 13 | Qualification to Final Round |
| 2 | Southern Samity | 6 | 4 | 0 | 2 | 10 | 4 | +6 | 12 | Qualification to Final Round |
| 3 | Mohammedan | 6 | 3 | 1 | 2 | 10 | 6 | +4 | 10 | |
| 4 | Hindustan | 6 | 0 | 0 | 6 | 3 | 15 | −12 | 0 | |

Source: i-league.org

==== Fixtures and results ====
| 21 January 2017 | Mohammedan | 0–2 | Southern Samity | Kolkata |
| 14:00 IST | | Report | Biswas 31'; A. Singh 71' | Stadium: Barasat Stadium; Attendance: 894; Referee: Rabichandra Singh Irengbam |

| 22 January 2017 | Hindustan | 0–1 | NEROCA | Delhi |
| 19:00 IST | | Report | Pritham 47' | Stadium: Thyagaraj Sports Complex; Attendance: 1,750; Referee: Senthil Nathan S. |

| 27 January 2017 | Mohammedan | 2–0 | NEROCA | Kolkata |
| 14:00 IST | Manvir Singh 12'; Vanlal Biaa 79' | Report | | Stadium: Barasat Stadium; Attendance: 300; Referee: Raktim Saha |

| 28 January 2017 | Southern Samity | 3–0 | Hindustan | Kolkata |
| 14:00 IST | Ronald Singh 10'; B. Singh 28'; Sayan Dutta 70' | Report | | Stadium: Barasat Stadium; Attendance: 133; Referee: Akash Jackson Routh |

| 4 February 2017 | NEROCA | 1–0 | Southern Samity | Manipur |
| 13:30 IST | Thangjam 77' | Report | | Stadium: Khuman Lampak; Attendance: 7,500 |

| 5 February 2017 | Hindustan | 0–1 | Mohammedan | Delhi |
| 11:00 IST | | Report | Vanlalbia 44' | Stadium: Ambedkar Stadium; Attendance: 677; Referee: R. Palmson Moses Raj |

| 11 February 2017 | Southern Samity | 2–0 | Mohammedan | Kolkata |
| 14:00 IST | | Report | Nnanna 41'; Lancine Toure 41' (o.g.) | Stadium: Barasat Stadium; Attendance: 2,500; Referee: Raktim Saha |

| 12 February 2017 | NEROCA | 1–0 | Hindustan | Imphal |
| 13:30 IST | Felix 90+2' (pen.) | Report | | Stadium: Khuman Lampak Main Stadium; Attendance: 9,000; Referee: T. H. Arun Kumar |

| 17 February 2017 | Mohammedan | 6–1 | Hindustan | Kolkata |
| 14:00 IST | Vasum 32'; Vallal Biaa 39', 42'; Manvir Singh 49'; Hembram 75'; Sk Faiaz 86' | Report | Kushant Chauhan 8' | Stadium: Barasat Stadium; Attendance: 300; Referee: Crystal John |

| 18 February 2017 | Southern Samity | 0–1 | NEROCA | Kolkata |
| 14:00 IST | | Report | David Lalbiakzara 16' | Stadium: Barasat Stadium; Attendance: 200; Referee: R. Palmson Moses Raj |

| 25 February 2017 | Hindustan | 2–3 | Southern Samity | Delhi |
| 14:00 IST | Tushar Chaudhary 38'; Kislay Singh Sajwan 90' (pen.) | Report | Biswas 30'; Kalu 45'; Moirangthem Basanta Singh 79' | Stadium: Ambedkar Stadium; Attendance: 200; Referee: Khamruddin Mohammed Avez |

| 25 February 2017 | NEROCA | 1–1 | Mohammedan | Imphal |
| 14:00 IST | Ejiogu Emmanuel Chinedu 29' | Report | Dodoz 84' | Stadium: Khuman Lampak Main Stadium; Attendance: 10,000; Referee: Jibon Chandra Gogoi |

=== Group C ===
| Pos | Team | Pld | W | D | L | GF | GA | GD | Pts | Qualification or relegation |
|---|---|---|---|---|---|---|---|---|---|---|
| 1 | Fateh Hyderabad (Note: Pride Sports boycotted the match against Fateh Hyderabad, hence Fateh Hyderabad were awarded 0–3 win) | 6 | 3 | 3 | 0 | 7 | 1 | +6 | 12 | Qualification to Final Round |
| 2 | Kenkre | 6 | 3 | 2 | 1 | 7 | 4 | +3 | 11 | Qualification to Final Round |
| 3 | Ozone | 6 | 3 | 1 | 2 | 13 | 8 | +5 | 10 | |
| 4 | Pride Sports | 6 | 0 | 0 | 6 | 2 | 16 | −14 | 0 | |

Source: i-league.org

==== Fixtures and results ====
| 20 January 2017 | Fateh Hyderabad | 2–0 | Pride Sports | Hyderabad |
| 15:45 IST | Adam Mitter 17'; Rinreithan Shaiza 85' | Report | | Stadium: Gachibowli Athletic Stadium; Attendance: 150; Referee: Ranjit Bakshi |

| 21 January 2017 | Ozone | 1–2 | Kenkre | Bangalore |
| 15:00 IST | Sabeeth 56' | Report | Yogesh Kadam 61'; Rajib Ghorui 65' | Stadium: Bangalore Football Stadium; Attendance: 2,500; Referee: Venkatesh R. |

| 27 January 2017 | Ozone | 3–0 | Pride Sports | Bangalore |
| 15:00 IST | Anto Xavier 30', 31'; Vignesh 37' | Report | | Stadium: Bangalore Football Stadium; Attendance: 2,700; Referee: Tanmoy Dhar |

| 27 January 2017 | Kenkre | 0–0 | Fateh Hyderabad | Mumbai |
| 15:30 IST | | Report | | Stadium: Cooperage Stadium; Attendance: 20; Referee: Khamruddin Mohammed Avez |

| 4 February 2017 | Pride Sports | 0–1 | Kenkre | Jabalpur |
| 15:30 IST | | Report | Yogesh Kadam 62' | Stadium: Ordinance Stadium; Attendance: 1,000; Referee: Khamruddin Mohammed Avez |

| 5 February 2017 | Fateh Hyderabad | 0–0 | Ozone | Hyderabad |
| 15:45 IST | | Report | | Stadium: Gachibowli Athletic Stadium; Attendance: 1,500; Referee: Tanmoy Dhar |

| 9 February 2017 | Fateh Hyderabad | 0–0 | Kenkre | Hyderabad |
| 15:45 IST | | Report | | Stadium: Gachibowli Athletic Stadium; Attendance: 200; Referee: Gibin Baby Kalarickal |

| 10 February 2017 | Pride Sports | 2–5 | Ozone | Jabalpur |
| 15:00 IST | Akhilesh Devrani 37'; Jonychand Singh Thounaojam 71' (pen.) | Report | Sabeeth 7'; Anto Xavier 62', 90+2'; Satish Kumar 81', 90+4' | Stadium: Ordinance Stadium; Attendance: 1,200; Referee: Mithanshu Das |

| 16 February 2017 | Ozone | 1–2 | Fateh Hyderabad | Bangalore |
| 15:00 IST | Anto Xavier 40' | Report | Tamang 3'; Nongmeithem Bonison Singh 23' | Stadium: Bangalore Football Stadium; Attendance: 2,500; Referee: Senthil Nathan S. |

| 17 February 2017 | Kenkre | 2–0 | Pride Sports | Mumbai |
| 15:30 IST | Yao Kouassi Bernard 48', 51' | Report | | Stadium: Cooperage Ground; Attendance: 200; Referee: Debashis Mandi |

| 24 February 2017 | Kenkre | 2–3 | Ozone | Mumbai |
| 15:30 IST | Yao Kouassi 64'; Yash Mhatre 78' | Report | Anto Xavier 288', 42'; Karthik Govindswamy 69' | Stadium: Cooperage Ground; Attendance: 250; Referee: Rowan Arumughan |

| 24 February 2017 | Pride Sports | 0–3 awarded | Fateh Hyderabad | Jabalpur |
| 15:30 IST | | Report | | Stadium: Ordinance Stadium; Attendance: 100; Referee: Gibin Baby Kalarickal |
Note: Pride Sports boycotted the match against Fateh Hyderabad, hence Fateh Hyderabad were awarded 0–3 win

== Final round ==
| Pos | Team | Pld | W | D | L | GF | GA | GD | Pts | Qualification |
|---|---|---|---|---|---|---|---|---|---|---|
| 1 | NEROCA (C) | 10 | 8 | 2 | 0 | 23 | 4 | +19 | 26 | Promotion to the I-League |
| 2 | Southern Samity | 10 | 5 | 2 | 3 | 16 | 15 | +1 | 17 | |
| 3 | Delhi United | 9 | 3 | 3 | 3 | 12 | 16 | −4 | 12 | |
| 4 | Fateh Hyderabad | 10 | 2 | 5 | 3 | 9 | 9 | 0 | 11 | |
| 5 | Lonestar Kashmir | 9 | 1 | 3 | 5 | 8 | 13 | −5 | 6 | |
| 6 | Kenkre | 10 | 1 | 3 | 6 | 11 | 20 | −9 | 6 | |

Source: I-league
(C) Champions

== Season statistics ==
=== Top scorers ===
Updated: 28 May 2017

| Rank | Player | Club | Goals |
|---|---|---|---|
| 1 | (Nigeria) Odafa Okolie | Southern Samity | 9 |
| 1 | (Nigeria) Felix Chidi Odili | NEROCA | 9 |
| 3 | (Nigeria) Stephan Harry | Delhi United | 8 |
| 4 | (India) Anto Xavier | Ozone | 7 |
| 5 | (India) Subhash Singh | NEROCA | 6 |
| 6 | (Ivory Coast) Yao Kouassi Bernard | Kenkre | 5 |
| 6 | (India) Aakif Javaid | Lonestar Kashmir | 5 |
| 8 | (India) Vanlal Biaa | Mohammedan | 4 |
| 8 | (Ivory Coast) Lago Dogbo Bei | Real Kashmir | 4 |
| 8 | (India) Ashim Biswas | Southern Samity | 4 |
| 8 | (India) Pritam Singh | NEROCA | 4 |
| 8 | (The Gambia) Saihou Jagne | Fateh Hyderabad | 4 |
| 13 | (India) Prem Kumar | Real Kashmir | 3 |
| 13 | (Nigeria) Ogba Kalu Nnanna | Southern Samity | 3 |
| 13 | (India) Thangjam Singh | NEROCA | 3 |
| 13 | (India) Mashangva Zenith | Delhi United | 3 |
| 13 | (India) Basanta Singh | Southern Samity | 3 |
| 13 | (India) Sampath Kuttymani | Kenkre | 3 |
| 13 | (India) Yogesh Kadam | Kenkre | 3 |
