= Tshering Dorji =

Bhutanese footballer

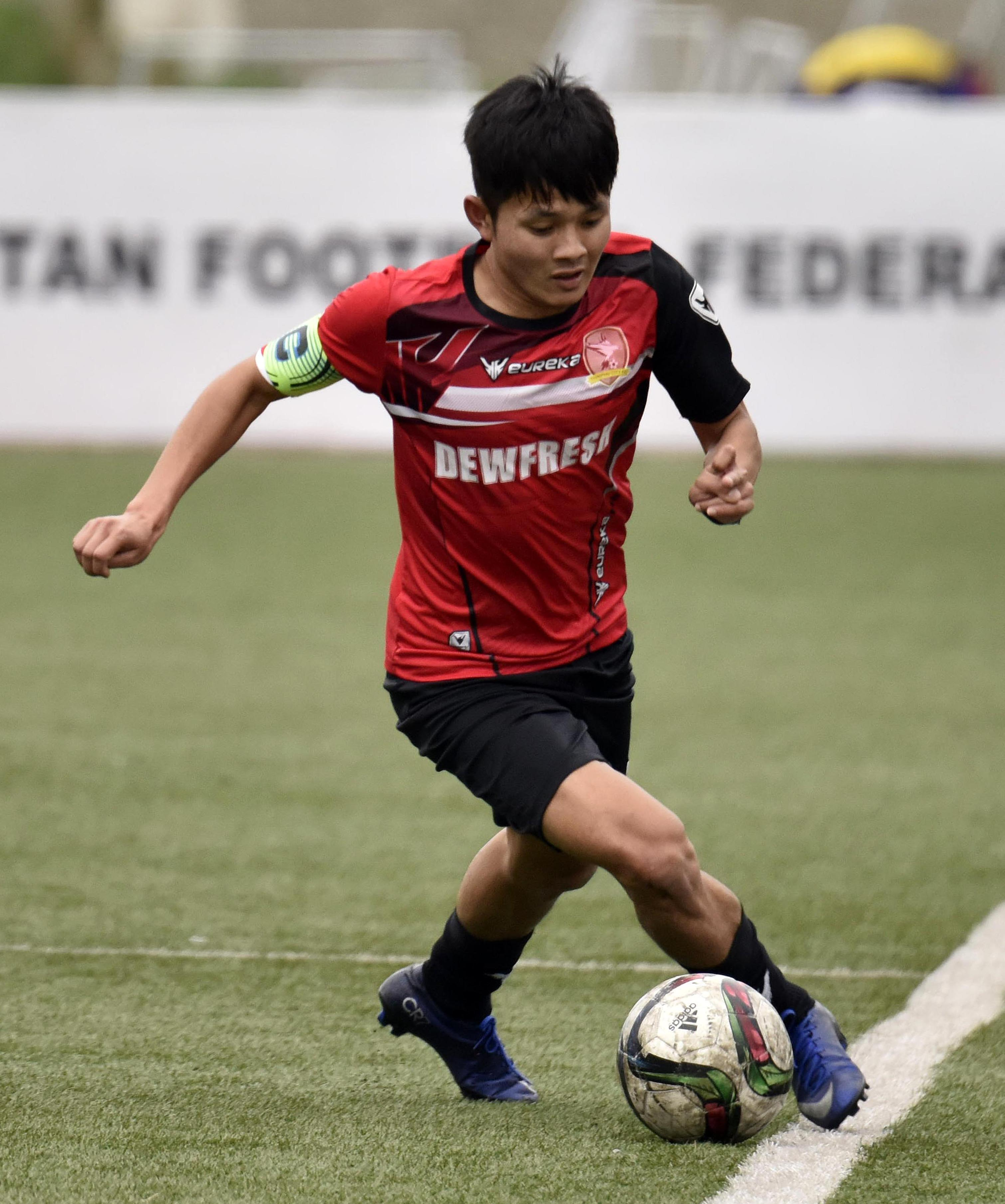
- Dorji with Thimphu City FC in 2017

Personal information
- Full name: Tshering Dorji
- Date of birth: 11 September 1995 (age 31)
- Place of birth: Ramjar, Trashiyangtse, Bhutan
- Height: 1.75 m (5 ft 9 in)
- Position: Midfielder

Team information
- Current team: Thimphu City FC
- Number: 16

Senior career*
Years	Team	Apps	(Gls)
2008	Transport United	10	(4)
2012–2014	Ugyen Academy		
2015–2018	Thimphu City	36	(9)
2018	Madhya Bharat	15	(3)
2018–2019	Aizawl	0	(0)
2019–2020	South United Bengaluru	7	(2)

International career
2011–	Bhutan	31	(5)
- * Club domestic league appearances and goals

Tshering Dorji aka Tshagay (born 11 September 1995) is a Bhutanese professional footballer who plays for Thimphu City FC as a midfielder.

Dorji is best known for the late goal he scored against Sri Lanka, which gave Bhutan their first ever win in the World Cup qualification.

As of March 2015, he was studying at the Royal Thimphu College as a first year student.

== Club career ==
=== South United ===
On 20 December 2018, it was announced that Tshering Dorji signed for Bengaluru-based club South United FC, which plays in the I-League 2nd Division, the tried tier of Indian football.

=== Madhya Bharat ===
In 2019, he joined the newly formed club from Bhopal, Madhya Bharat SC, which has earlier played in the 2017–18 season of the I-League 2nd Division.

== International career ==
Dorji represents Bhutan in international football since 2011. He made his senior debut on 12 March against Sri Lanka in 3–0 loss match at the 2011 SAFF Championship in New Delhi.

== International statistics ==
Scores and results list the Bhutan's goal tally first.

No.	Date	Venue	Opponent	Score	Result	Competition
1.	12 March 2015	Sugathadasa Stadium, Colombo, Sri Lanka	Sri Lanka	1–0	1–0	2018 FIFA World Cup qualification
2.	8 October 2015	Changlimithang Stadium, Thimphu, Bhutan	Maldives	1–4	3–4	2018 FIFA World Cup qualification
3.	24 December 2015	Trivandrum International Stadium, India	Maldives	1–1	1−3	2015 SAFF Championship
4.	29 March 2016	National Stadium, Malé, Maldives	Maldives	2–1	2–4	2018 FIFA World Cup qualification
5.	6 June 2019	Changlimithang Stadium, Thimphu, Bhutan	Guam	1–0	1–0	2022 FIFA World Cup qualification

== See also ==
- Bhutan men's international footballers
