= 2016–17 I-League U18 final round =

2016–17 I-League U18 Final Round
Tournament details
- Country: India
- Dates: 28 April – 7 May 2017
- Teams: 12

Tournament statistics
- Matches played: 21
- Goals scored: 74 (3.52 per match)
- All statistics correct as of 7 May 2017.

The 2016–17 I-League U18 Final Round will feature 12 teams qualified from first round. The teams are drawn into three groups of four teams. Three group winners and one best second placed team enter semifinal. Matches will be played on various grounds in Kolkata.

== Group stage ==
=== Group A ===
| Pos | Team | Pld | W | D | L | GF | GA | GD | Pts | Qualification (Note: All games played at Kalyani Stadium, Kolkata.) | USC | SAL | RW | BBFS |
|---|---|---|---|---|---|---|---|---|---|---|---|---|---|---|
| 1 | United | 3 | 3 | 0 | 0 | 17 | 3 | +14 | 9 | Advance to semifinal | — | 5–3 | 3–0 | 9–0 |
| 2 | Salgaocar | 3 | 2 | 0 | 1 | 14 | 9 | +5 | 6 | Advance to semifinal | | — | 3–2 | 8–2 |
| 3 | Royal Wahingdoh | 3 | 1 | 0 | 2 | 4 | 7 | −3 | 3 | | | | — | 2–1 |
| 4 | Bhaichung Bhutia FS | 3 | 0 | 0 | 3 | 3 | 19 | −16 | 0 | | | | | — |

Source: U-18 I-league

=== Group B ===
| Pos | Team | Pld | W | D | L | GF | GA | GD | Pts | Qualification (Note: All games played at East Bengal Ground, Kolkata.) | KEB | PC | TFA | LAJ |
|---|---|---|---|---|---|---|---|---|---|---|---|---|---|---|
| 1 | East Bengal | 3 | 2 | 1 | 0 | 6 | 3 | +3 | 7 | Advance to semifinal | — | 3–1 | 1–0 | 2–2 |
| 2 | Pune City | 3 | 2 | 0 | 1 | 3 | 3 | 0 | 6 | | | — | 1–0 | 1–0 |
| 3 | Tata Football Academy | 3 | 1 | 0 | 2 | 1 | 2 | −1 | 3 | | | | — | 1–0 |
| 4 | Shillong Lajong | 3 | 0 | 1 | 2 | 2 | 4 | −2 | 1 | | | | | — |

Source: U-18 I-league

=== Group C ===
| Pos | Team | Pld | W | D | L | GF | GA | GD | Pts | Qualification (Note: All games played at Barasat Stadium, Kolkata.) | AIFF | DSK | BFC | MIN |
|---|---|---|---|---|---|---|---|---|---|---|---|---|---|---|
| 1 | AIFF Academy | 3 | 2 | 0 | 1 | 6 | 3 | +3 | 6 | Advance to semifinal | — | 2–1 | 0–1 | 4–1 |
| 2 | DSK Shivajians | 3 | 1 | 1 | 1 | 5 | 5 | 0 | 4 (Note: DSK Shivajians head of Bengaluru FC on number of goals scored, head-to-head record and goal-difference being the same.) | | | — | 0–0 | 4–3 |
| 3 | Bengaluru FC | 3 | 1 | 1 | 1 | 1 | 1 | 0 | 4 | | | | — | 0–1 |
| 4 | Minerva Punjab | 3 | 1 | 0 | 2 | 5 | 8 | −3 | 3 | | | | | — |

Source: U-18 I-league

=== Ranking of runner-up teams ===
| Pos | Grp | Team | Pld | W | D | L | GF | GA | GD | Pts | Qualification |
|---|---|---|---|---|---|---|---|---|---|---|---|
| 1 | A | Salgaocar | 3 | 2 | 0 | 1 | 14 | 9 | +5 | 6 (Note: Salgaocar ahead of Pune City on goal-difference) | Advance to semifinal |
| 2 | B | Pune City | 3 | 2 | 0 | 1 | 3 | 3 | 0 | 6 | |
| 3 | C | DSK Shivajians | 3 | 1 | 1 | 1 | 5 | 5 | 0 | 4 | |

Source: U-18 I-league

== Knock–out stage ==
=== Bracket ===
Semi-Finals
United | 0 (12)
AIFF Academy | 0 (13)
East Bengal | 3
Salgaocar | 2

Final
AIFF Academy | 2
East Bengal | 1
Third Place

=== Semi-finals ===
5 May 2017
09:00 IST

| United | 0–0 | AIFF Academy |
|---|---|---|
| | Report |
Penalties
| | 12–13 |

Barasat Stadium, Kolkata
Attendance: 100
Referee: Valenton Raphael Fernandes
5 May 2017
15:30 IST

| East Bengal | 3–2 | Salgaocar |
|---|---|---|
| Bidyashagar Singh 14'; Suranjit Singh 43', 60' | Report | Andrus John 80'; Liston Colaco 86' |

Barasat Stadium, Kolkata
Attendance: 500
Referee: Ravindra Thapliyal

=== Final ===
7 May 2017
15:30 IST

| AIFF Academy | 2–1 | East Bengal |
|---|---|---|
| Lalengmawia 15'; Namgyal Bhutia 42' | Report | Bidyashagar Singh 14' |

Barasat Stadium, Kolkata
Attendance: 1000
Referee: Valenton Raphael Fernandes
