= Lhendup Dorji (footballer) =

Bhutanese professional footballer

Personal information
- Full name: Lhendup Dorji
- Date of birth: 5 December 1994 (age 31)
- Place of birth: Paro, Bhutan
- Height: 1.71 m (5 ft 7 1/2 in)
- Position: Midfielder

Youth career
- Ugyen Academy

Senior career*
Years	Team	Apps	(Gls)
2013	Ugyen Academy		
2015	Druk Star		
2015	Thimphu F.C.		
2018	Paro		
2019	Lonestar Kashmir FC	6	(0)

International career^{‡}
2015–	Bhutan	25	(0)
- * Club domestic league appearances and goals ‡ National team caps and goals as of 3 October 2019

Lhendup Dorji is a Bhutanese professional footballer.

== Career ==
He began playing school and club football with Ugyen Academy at the age of 14. He won the 2013 Bhutan National League. The midfielder was also the part of Ugyen Academy FC squad which played in the 2014 AFC President's Cup. Lhendup Dorji was among the players Paro FC signed in their debut season in 2018. Following performances both domestically and in continental football, Lhendup Dorji earned himself a move to Lonestar Kashmir in the Indian I-League 2nd Division 2019.

=== International career ===
He made first appearance for the Bhutan national football team in 2015 in their historic World Cup qualifying match against Sri Lanka. He also played in a number of second qualifying round matches and in the 2015 SAFF Championship.

== Career statistics ==
As of 1 February 2019

Club	Season	League			League Cup		Domestic Cup		Continental		Total	
Club	Season	Division	Apps	Goals	Apps	Goals	Apps	Goals	Apps	Goals	Apps	Goals
Lonestar Kashmir	2018–19	I-League 2nd	6	0	—	—	0	0	—	—	6	0

== Honours ==
- Bhutan National League: 2013
