= Rogelio Juárez =

Panamanian footballer (born 1991)

Personal information
- Full name: Rogelio Juárez Robinson
- Date of birth: 7 July 1991 (age 35)
- Place of birth: San Miguelito District, Panama
- Height: 1.76 m (5 ft 9 in)
- Position: Midfielder

Senior career*
Years	Team	Apps	(Gls)
2013	Santa Tecla	2	(0)
2015	Moca		
2017	Social Sol	2	(0)
2018	Arnett Gardens		
2018–2019	Avilés Industrial		
2019–2020	Mount Pleasant	2	(0)
2021	Lonestar Kashmir		
2021	Corbett FC	4	(0)
- * Club domestic league appearances and goals

Rogelio Juárez Robinson (born 7 July 1991) is a Panamanian footballer who last played as a midfielder for Corbett FC.

== Career ==
Before the second half of 2013–13, Juárez signed for Salvadoran side Santa Tecla. Before the 2015 season, he signed for Moca in the Dominican Republic. Before the second half of 2016–17, Juárez signed for Honduran club Social Sol, where he made 2 league appearances and scored 0 goals. On 5 February 2017, he debuted for Social Sol during a 1–2 loss to Vida. Before the second half of 2017–18, Juárez signed for Arnett Gardens in Jamaica. In 2018, he signed for Bolivian team Avilés Industrial. In 2019, he signed for Mount Pleasant in Jamaica after receiving offers from Honduras. In 2021, Juárez signed for Indian outfit Lonestar Kashmir.
