= Sandip Bhattacharjee =

Indian singer (born 1980)

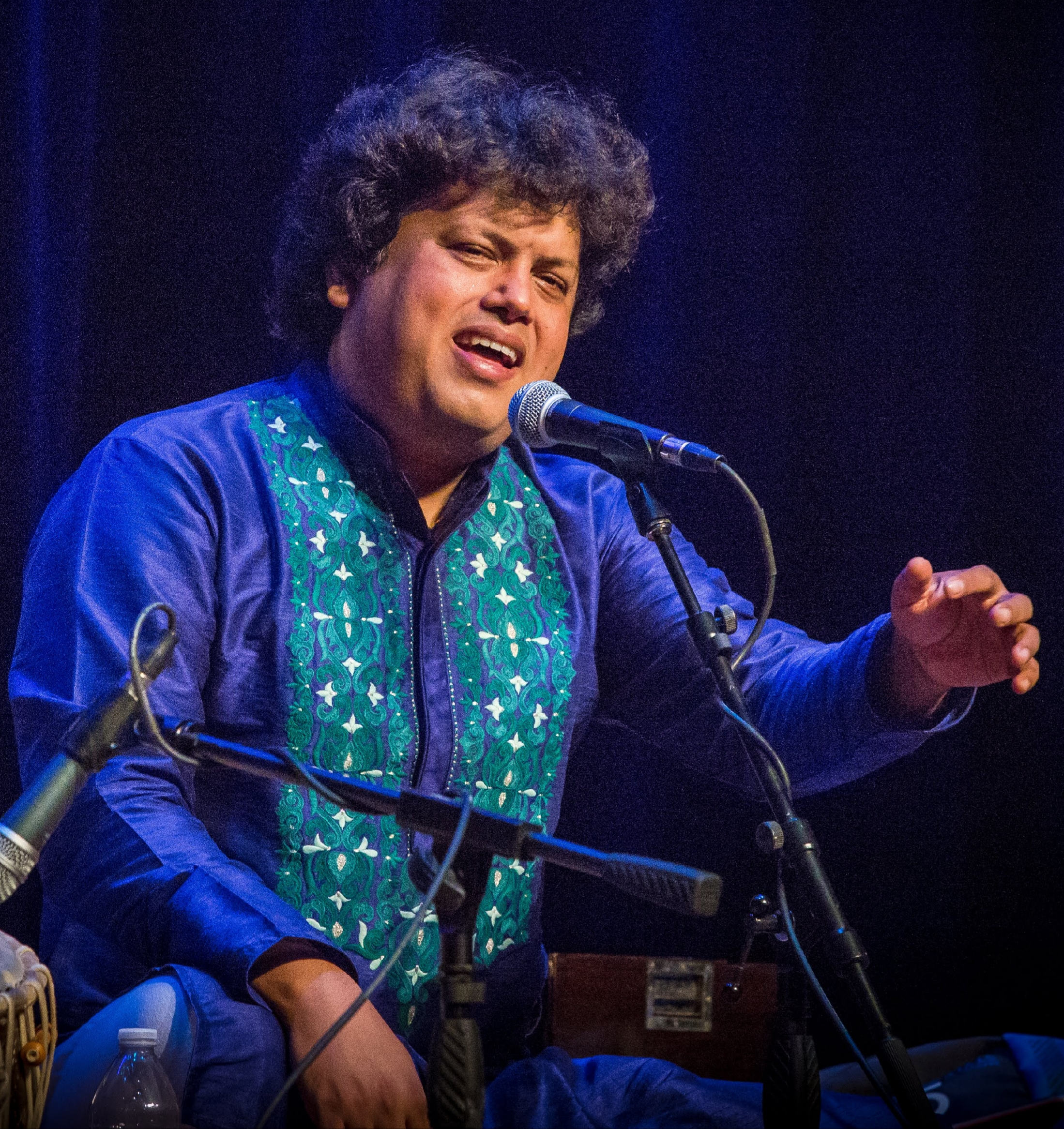
- Indian Classical Vocalist of Kirana Gharana

Background information
- Born: Sandip Bhattacharjee; 10 September 1980 (age 45); Krishnanagar, West Bengal
- Origin: Kolkata, India
- Genres: Hindustani classical music, Indian classical music
- Occupation: Hindustani Classical Vocalist
- Years active: 1980–present
- Labels: Khyal, Bhajan, Thumri, Ghazal
- Website: sandipraga.com

Sandip Bhattacharjee (Hindi: संदीप भट्टाचार्य, Bengali: সন্দীপ ভট্টাচার্য্য; born 10 September 1980), is an Indian classical singer belonging to the Kirana gharana (style of singing).His repertoire covers pure classical, Khyal, Thumris, Ghazals etc.

== Early life ==
Sandip was born in Krishnanagar, a suburb of West Bengal, India, approximately 100 km(62 miles) from Kolkata. From an early age his parents encouraged his musical talent. Sandip received his first lessons from his mother Krishna Bhattacharjee and subsequently from Amrita Dasgupta. A close family friend Dr. Basudeb Mondol recognized his promising musicality and brought him to ITC-Sangeet Research Academy, Kolkata, then Sandip was 16 years old. Sandip started his Talim under the distinguished guidance of Mashkoor Ali Khan and Mubarakh Ali Khan, sons and disciple of sarangi player Padmashree Shakoor Khan. In 2002 Sandip joined ITC-SRA as a residential scholar and in 2012 became an acknowledged musician at the academy.

== Career ==
=== Academic degree ===
Sandip holds a bachelor's degree from Rabindra Bharati University (Kolkata) in classical music. He ranked First Class First.

Besides Kheyal gayaki he is also skilled in singing semi-classical forms such as Thumri, Bhajans, Ghazals and Bengali regional songs like Nazrulgeeti, Raag Pradhan .

=== Albums ===
1. Hindustani Classical Music CD by Sonic Octaves, Mumbai
2. Album of Bengali Songs by R.P. Technivision, Kolkata.
3. Album of Bhajan by Sonic Octaves, Mumbai.
4. Album of Hindustani Classical Music by Bihan Music, Kolkata. .
5. Nazrulgeeti album titled "Mone Pore Aaj" by Angel Digital Pvt. Ltd., Kolkata.
6. Rabindra Sangeet Album titled "Prem Esechilo" by Angel Digital.

=== Awards ===
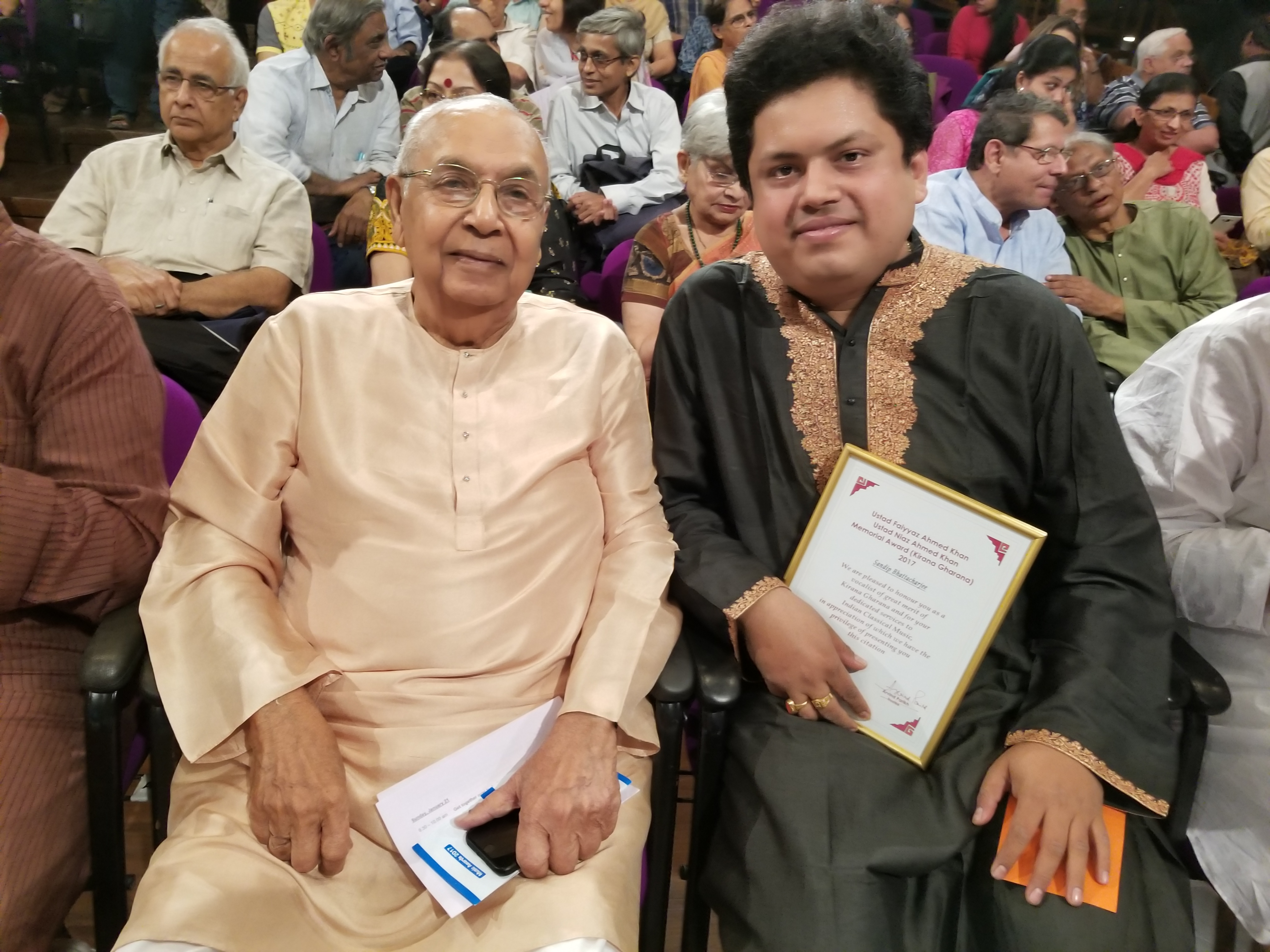
Sandip with Arvind Parikh after receiving the award

- Sandip won the All India Radio Music Competition (1999) in Khayal.
- First at West Bengal State Music Competition 2001 in Bhajan.
- Sandip received National Talent Search Scholarship, Govt. of India in 2000.
- "A" Grade Kheyal Vocalist of All India Radio & Doordarshan from 2007 and was elevated to 'Top' Grade Khayal Vocalist status by All India Radio (AIR) in 2026.
- Sandip was awarded the title of ″Sur Mani″ by the Sur Singer Samsad, Mumbai in 2005.
- Sandip received UGC scholarship.
- Recipient of the " Sparkling Jewel Award" bestowed by The Hindu (New Delhi Newspaper)
- Sandip received "Ustad Faiyyaz Ahmed Khan & Ustad Niaz Ahmed Khan Memorial award (Kirana Gharana) 2017" (Mumbai), NCPA.
- 'A' grade artist at All India Radio and Doordarshan since 1999.
- Sandip has received Bharat Dignity Award in 2022 for his contribution to Hindustani Classical Music worldwide.

== Personal life ==
He has been married to Susmita Chakraborty since 26 January 2014 and loves cooking.
