= José Hevia =

Spanish football coach

Personal information
- Full name: José Carlos Rodriguez Hevia
- Date of birth: 1 April 1972 (age 54)
- Place of birth: Gijón, Asturias, Spain

Managerial career
- Years: Team
- 2016–2017: Minerva Punjab (assistant)
- 2017–2018: Madhya Bharat
- 2018-2020: Shillong Lajong
- 2020–2022: Mohammedan
- 2024–2025: Shillong Lajong
- 2025-2026: Gokulam Kerala

Jose Hevia is a Spanish football coach who was recently the head coach of Indian Football League club Gokulam Kerala.

== Career ==
Born in Asturias, Hevia started working with youth categories before acquiring his coaching qualifications in 2002. Shortly after, he took over lower league sides Club Social Alcoa-Inespal, UD San Claudio, CD Manuel Rubio and AD Gigantes. In 2017 Hevia joined the Celtic F.C. Academy partner, Madhya Bharat SC. He also coached the then I-League club Minerva Punjab in 2017.

== Managerial statistics ==
As of 5 November 2025

Managerial record by team and tenure
Team	Nat	From	To	Record					Ref
Team	Nat	From	To	G	W	D	L	Win %	Ref
Mohammedan	(India)	24 October 2020	19 February 2021	8	2	4	2	25.00	
Shillong Lajong	(India)	12 July 2024	31 May 2025	26	10	8	8	38.46	
Gokulam Kerala	(India)	6 June 2025	13 December 2025	5	1	0	4	20.00	
Total				39	13	12	14	33.33	—
