= Pride Sports FC =

Indian association football club

Pride Sports
- Full name: Pride Sports Football Club
- Nickname: Pride
- Ground: Ravishankar Shukla Stadium
- Capacity: 15,000
- Owner: Pride Sports Management Pvt. Ltd.
- Head coach: Abhijoy Basu
- League: I-League 2nd Division
Home colours	Away colours

Pride Sports Football Club was an Indian professional football club based in Jabalpur, Madhya Pradesh. Pride Sports competed as a member of the I-League 2nd Division, the then second tier of football in India. They also played in the Madhya Pradesh Premier League. The club played their home matches at Ravishankar Shukla Stadium in Jabalpur.

== History ==
Pride Sports FC was founded in Jabalpur with a vision to promote football in the Indian state of Madhya Pradesh. In 2016, the club debuted in the I-League 2nd Division. They became the second club from Madhya Pradesh to participate in any national level football tournament of India, after Madhya Bharat SC.

In 2016–17 I-League 2nd Division preliminary rounds, Pride Sports finished at the bottom of group C.

== Rivalries ==
Their main rival was Madhya Bharat, whom they played the "Madhya Derby".

== Kit manufacturers and shirt sponsors ==
Period	Kit manufacturer	Shirt sponsor
2016—17		None
2018	Cosco	KS Oils

== Players ==
As of 19 August 2020

=== Final squad ===
Note: Flags indicate national team as defined under FIFA eligibility rules; some limited exceptions apply. Players may hold more than one non-FIFA nationality.

No.	Pos.	Nation	Player
—	GK	IND	Sumit Das
—	DF	IND	Amandeep Singh
—	DF	IND	Deepak Kumar
—	DF	IND	Pankaj Singh
—	DF	IND	Karamvir Singh
—	DF	IND	Ananya Watts
—	DF	IND	Robin Chhetri
—	FW	IND	Glakson Thomas Mascarenhas

No.	Pos.	Nation	Player
—	MF	IND	Abhiraj Vikram Singh
—	FW	GHA	John Ampong
—	FW	IND	Gaurav Pandey
—	FW	IND	Bijoy Kumar Jirel
—	FW	IND	Sanad Girotra
—	MF	IND	Akhilesh Devrani
—	MF	IND	Abhishek Sharma

== Managerial record ==
updated on 28 May 2017

Name	Nationality	From	To	P	W	D	L	GF	GA	Win%
Paulo Pedro	Portugal	2016	2017	6	0	0	6	2	16	0.00
Abhijoy Basu	India	2018								

== Team records ==
=== Seasons ===
As of 18 December 2016

Year	League								Federation Cup	Top Scorer(s)	
Year	P	W	D	L	GF	GA	Pts	Pos.	Federation Cup	Player(s)	Goals
2016–17	6	0	0	6	2	16	0	TBD	TBD	TBD	TBD

== See also ==
- List of football clubs in India
