= Boubacar Keita =

Guinean footballer (born 1984)

Personal information
- Date of birth: 20 May 1984 (age 42)
- Place of birth: Conakry, Guinea
- Height: 1.86 m (6 ft 1 in)
- Positions: Defender; midfielder

Senior career*
Years	Team	Apps	(Gls)
2004–2005	SAFFC		
2006	Persitara North Jakarta	21	(5)
2007	Pelita Jaya FC	19	(4)
2008	Pahang FA	20	(3)
2008–2009	Arema Malang	17	(2)
2011–2013	Sporting Clube de Goa	41	(7)
2014	Soumba FC	21	(4)
2016–2017	Kenkre FC	16	(2)

International career
2012	Guinea	13	(2)
- * Club domestic league appearances and goals

Boubacar Keita (born 20 May 1984 in Conakry) is a Guinean former professional footballer who played defender or midfielder.
