= Fateh Hyderabad AFC =

Indian association football club based in Hyderabad

Fateh Hyderabad
- Full name: Fateh Hyderabad Associated Football Club
- Nickname: Nizams
- Founded: 2015; 11 years ago
- Ground: G.M.C Balayogi Athletic Stadium, Hyderabad, Telangana
- Capacity: 18,000
- Owner: Yogesh Maurya
- League: I-League 2nd Division

Fateh Hyderabad Associated Football Club, also known as Fateh Hyderabad FC, is an Indian professional football club based in Hyderabad, Telangana, that last competed in the I-League 2nd Division, then second tier of the Indian football league system.

== History ==
=== Inception ===
Fateh Hyderabad was founded in 2015. The club is owned by Yogesh Maurya and Aditya Narayanan, who studied together at Wharton Business School. They officially launched the club on 4 September at Park Hyatt Hyderabad. Its infrastructure for training and player accommodation is situated at Gundlapochampalli, on the outskirts of Hyderabad. Yogesh Maurya is also a part of the coaching staff and attended AIFF's AFC 'B' Coaching Licence Course in Goa in September 2015 to improve his understanding of the game. Maurya has served as the club's Technical and Sporting Director since its founding.

In February 2017, the club announced a joint venture with Premier Education Group of the UK which will teach physical education in schools throughout Hyderabad.

=== I-League 2nd Division ===
The newly founded Fateh Hyderabad AFC made their debut in 2015–16 I-League 2nd Division. Fateh Hyderabad were placed in Group A. Their first match ended in a goalless draw against NEROCA on 14 November 2015. Fateh Hyderabad lost their next six matches in the group stage. On 8 December 2015, Nitin Jyal became the first goalscorer for the club in their 1–2 loss to Mohammedan Sporting. Fateh Hyderabad recorded their first ever win in their eight and final match of the season against Neroca. Shahil Bhatt scored twice in a 2–1 victory for the club. The season also saw 16-year-old Tao Shaiza debut for the club. Shahil Bhatt was the club's top scorer in the season with three goals. Fateh Hyderabad finished last in the group stage, with only one win from their eight matches.

The following 2016–17 season saw significant improvements at Fateh Hyderabad. The club signed three foreign players, including Englishman Adam Mitter from Stafford Rangers FC, who took on the role of captain. They later roped in Fijian player Gurjeet Singh. The club topped their group and remained undefeated in their six group stage matches, thus qualifying for the Final Round of the I-League 2nd Division for the first time in their history. They finished fourth in the Final Round of the league, managing only two wins from ten matches. With nine clean sheets, Fateh Hyderabad had the most clean sheets in the 2nd Division that season. Gambian striker Saihou Jagne was the club's top scorer with four goals.

At the end of the 2016–17 season, the club saw several key players move to ISL clubs. Gurtej Singh, their captain and most experienced defender, was drafted by FC Pune City. Defender Abdul Hakku and goalkeeper Kunzang Bhutia were drafted to Northeast United and ATK respectively.

Ahead of the 2017–18 I-League 2nd Division season, they roped in Ellimishetty Shyam as head coach. On 14 March 2018, club owner Yogesh Maurya announced that Fateh Hyderabad would be moving their home ground to the RDT Stadium in Anantapur for the upcoming 2017–18 season of the I-League 2nd Division. According to Maurya, the poor pitch conditions at the Gachibowli Stadium forced them to move to another stadium. Maurya also disclosed plans for Fateh Hyderabad to have their own stadium in the next few seasons.

== Stadium ==
Fateh Hyderabad Football Club play their home matches at the Lal Bahadur Shastri Stadium.

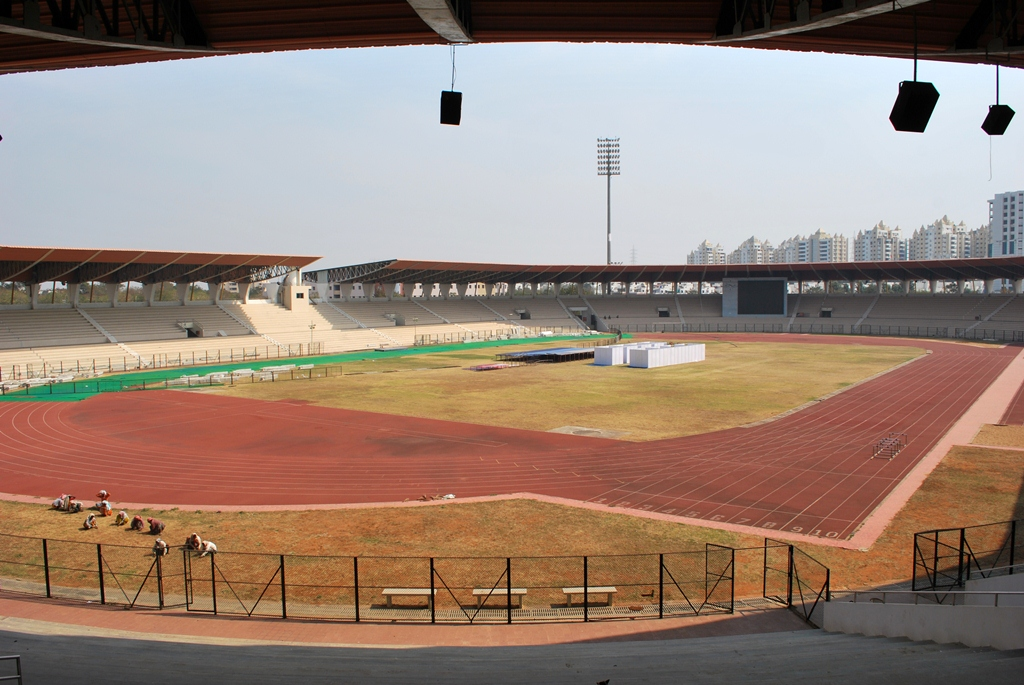
The Gachibowli Athletic Stadium, home to the Fateh Hyderabad AFC

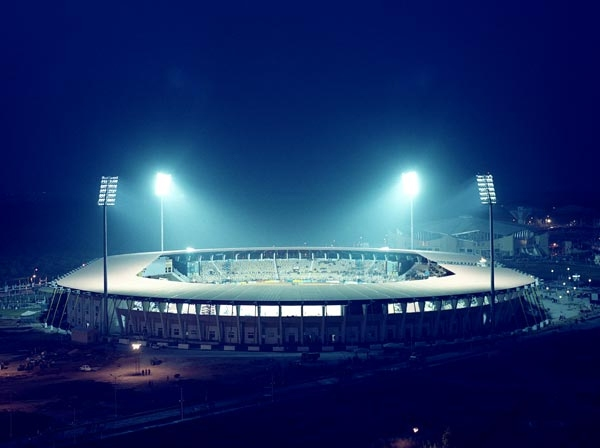
Night view of the stadium

The Lal Bahadur Shastri Stadium, formerly known as Fateh Maidan, is a football and cricket stadium in Hyderabad, Telangana. The stadium was renamed in 1967 in memory of Lal Bahadur Shastri, India's former Prime Minister. The stadium is situated behind the police control room, between the Nizam College and Public Gardens in Hyderabad. It is the venue for many national and international sporting events, especially football and cricket.

For the 2017–18 season, Fateh Hyderabad moved their home ground to the Anantapur Sports Village Football Ground, in Anantapur, due to poor pitch conditions at the Gachibowli Stadium.

== Managerial history ==
- (India) Ellimishetty Shyam (2015–2018)
- (India) Vimal Arora (2019)
- (India) Abhik Chatterjee (2019–present)

== Kit manufacturers and shirt sponsors ==
Period	Kit manufacturer	Shirt sponsor
2015—2016	Vamos	
2016—2018	T10 Sports	
2018—present	Vector X	

== Team records ==
Season	Div.	Tms.	Pos.	Attendance/G	Federation Cup/Super Cup	AFC Champions League	AFC Cup
2016–17	I-League 2nd	12	4th	469	DNP	DNP	DNP
2017–18	I-League 2nd	18	Group stage	120	DNP	DNP	DNP
2018–19	I-League 2nd	16		–	DNP	DNP	DNP

Key

- Tms. = Number of teams
- Pos. = Position in league
- Attendance/G = Average league attendance

=== Seasons ===
As of 29 April 2018

Year	Division	League								Federation Cup
Year	Division	Pos.	P	W	D	L	GF	GA	Pts	Federation Cup
2015–16	I-League 2nd Division	Group stage	8	1	1	6	5	17	4	—
2016–17	I-League 2nd Division	4th	16	5	8	3	16	10	23	—
2017–18	I-League 2nd Division	Group stage	10	5	2	3	23	16	17	—

== Honours ==
- Paral Kote Football Trophy
  - Winners (1): 2019

== See also ==
- List of football clubs in India
- Hyderabad FC
