= Anantapur Sports Village =

Sporting facility in Anantapur, India

- Location: Anantapur, Andhra Pradesh
- Country: India
- Establishment: 2000
- Capacity: 6000
- Owner: Rural Development Trust
- Operator: Rural Development Trust
- As of 7 March 2016; Source: Anantapur Sports Academy Official Website

Anantapur Sports Village is a full-fledged sporting facility in Anantapur, Andhra Pradesh maintained by Rural Development Trust, an NGO. It is home to Anantapur Sports Academy which is considered to be one of the Sport for Development Programmes in India. The current director as of January 2025 is Pulluru Sai Krishna.

ASA runs programmes in the seven sporting disciplines of hockey, football, cricket, judo, softball, kho-kho and kabaddi, through 90 centres across Anantapur district engaging more than 10,840 children and youth, with 45% being girls. ASA operates the programme through three avenues: Grassroot Programme, Development Centres and Anantapur Sports Village.

In the past two decades since 2000, Anantapur Sports Academy has been working continuously with like-minded organisations both at the grassroots level, including rural schools and respective district, state, and national sports federations, as well as larger development initiatives like Pro Sport Development (India), Learning Curve Life Skills Foundation, Manipal Academy of Higher Education, La Liga Foundation and La Liga Women (Spain), One Million Hockey Legs (Netherlands) and Stick for India (Spain) to attain the vision of achieving social change using sport.

Anantapur Sports Academy received Rashtriya Khel Protsahan Puaraskar, the highest award given by the Government of India in Sport for Development.

The village also hosts Indian National camps for senior teams like the Indian football team. It also holds annual camps in different disciplines.
