= Cosco (India) Limited =

Indian sports equipment manufacturer

Cosco (India) Ltd.
- Type: Public
- Industry: Sports equipment, fitness equipment
- Founded: 1980; 46 years ago
- Headquarters: Delhi, India
- Key people: Devinder Kumar Jain (Managing Director & CEO); Narinder Kumar Jain (Managing Director)
- Operating income: 125.79 crore (March 2016)
- Total assets: 40.67 crore (March 2012)
- Number of employees: 1001–2500
- Website: www.cosco.in

Cosco (India) Ltd. is an Indian sports equipment manufacturer based in Delhi.

Cosco makes equipment for multiple sports, among them basketball, football, volleyball, handball, cricket, tennis, rackets, table tennis, and roller skating as well as fitness equipment.

== History ==
The company was founded on 25 January 1980 under the Companies Act, 1956. Cosco was a sister company of Enkay India Rubber Company, Pvt. Ltd., which also produces sports equipment.

Cosco was a private company until 15 March 1994 after which it went public. After its incorporation, it took over the partnership firm Coronation Sportingball Co., founded in 1976, a producer of sports balls. The company's shares are traded on India's BSE SENSEX.

The company is part of the World Federation of the Sporting Goods Industry, the Sports Goods Export Promotion Council and the Sports Goods Foundation of India.

== Sponsorship ==
Most tournaments in India use Cosco products. Cosco was the official sports partner for 2015's 35th National Games in Kerala for football, table tennis and handball.

=== Football ===
==== State level teams ====
- Kerala

==== Clubs ====
- (Bangladesh) Sheikh Russel (2018−2024)
- (Bangladesh) Mohammedan Sporting Club (2018−2021)
- (Bhutan) Thimphu (2018−)
- (Bhutan) Druk Star (2018−)
- (Bhutan) Druk United (2018−)
- (Bhutan) Ugyen Academy (2018−)
- (India) Bhawanipore FC (2018−)
- (India) Hindustan (2014−)
- (India) Kenkre (2016−17)
- (India) F.C. Kerala (2018−)
- (India) Lonestar Kashmir (2018−)
- (India) United Sikkim FC (2020−)
