= Bhaichung Bhutia Football Schools =

- Industry: Sports
- Founded: 2010; 16 years ago
- Headquarters: New Delhi, India
- Area served: India
- Key people: Bhaichung Bhutia; Kishore Taid; Anurag Khilnani
- Website: bbfootballschools.com

Bhaichung Bhutia Football Schools (BBFS), an entity of Talent Invigoration and Sports Management Private Limited, is a football youth development initiative by Bhaichung Bhutia, the former Indian football team captain, Kishore Taid, and Anurag Khilnani, in association with Football by Carlos Queiroz (FBCQ), the Portuguese football academy by Carlos Queiroz. BBFS aims to cater to children in the age group of 5 to 23 years and deliver coaching experience under the guidance of senior coaches. As per Bhutia, BBFS is planned to be an all-inclusive venture where 20–30% of the enrolled students at BBFS are targeted to be from underprivileged sections of the society.

== Launch ==
BBFS was launched on 30 October 2010, in a press conference held at the Shangrila hotel in New Delhi by Bhaichung Bhutia and Tiago Lopes (CEO, FBCQ). BBFS started regular coaching in Delhi on 29 November 2010 at Ryan International School, and now has its operations in more than 15 cities across the country.

== Academy accreditation ==
As per the All India Football Federations' (AIFF) Academy Accreditation Program, Bhaichung Bhutia Football Schools and its partner clubs secured the Elite Academy Accreditation from three cities for the 2023-24 season. BBFS Delhi has been awarded 3 star elite academy rating by AIFF whereas its partner club Snipers FC & Brothers Sports Association have been awarded elite academy status in the South and West Zone respectively.

== Residential academies ==
Apart from its non-residential football institutions across the country, Bhaichung Bhutia Football Schools also operate four residential academies situated in Gurgaon Nashik, Shillong & Hosur. These residential academies have been in partnership with some of the legacy schools such as Barnes School & Junior College, Devlali and Assam Rifles Public School, Laitkor. These residential academies provide an opportunity to budding student athletes to pursue professional football training along with their academics within these schools. Admission to the residential academies are done through a series of scouting programmes conducted throughout the country by the BBFS Technical and Management personnel. In December 2019 BBFS also initiated the 'Prince of Football' project in association with the Sports and Youth Affairs (S&YA) Department, Government of Sikkim. Prince of Football is a collaborative initiative, where a rigorous process of selection from block level to district level and final to state level will pave the way to select talented footballers that will form a Sikkim team which will go on to play at national level tournaments organized by the BBFS.

== Garhwal Heroes FC ==
Garhwal Heroes FC (formerly Garhwal FC) is an Indian football club formed in 1953 in New Delhi. The club, via a strategic tie-up, currently operates under the aegis of Bhaichung Bhutia Football Schools – the largest and most reputed football youth development setup in India.

Garhwal Heroes FC provides BBFS the platform to lay down a pathway for player development in the senior categories. Through the club, BBFS players will be able to further their passion for football by playing professionally.

Garwhal Heroes FC emerged champions of the Delhi Senior Division and in 2023-24. The club comprised 9 of its players promoted from BBFS' youth development programme.

== United Sikkim ==
United Sikkim FC was founded in 2011, by Sikkim Football Association (SFA) and Baichung Bhutia. On 22 March 2011, the club was launched as a professional, which would be co-owned by Fidelis World, Bhaichung Bhutia and Shankar Mahadevan.

The Snow Lion Cup for under-14 kids was incorporated, and coaching camps with grassroot framework in the areas of Sikkim, Kalimpong and Darjeeling were set up by the club, with partnership of State Bank of India and BBFS.

== Social responsibility ==
Bhaichung Bhutia's vision that "no talented Indian kid should be deprived of good coaching facilities for want of money or other resources" led to the establishment of the Indian Football Foundation (IFF), which is a sister organization to BBFS. It is one of the first not-for-profit organizations in India that is specifically focused on supporting talented young footballers from economically weaker sections to develop into professional footballers in an organized manner. Funds are raised to aid underprivileged young footballers with a 100 percent scholarship to provide them with quality coaching through BBFS. The IFF through its strategic tie ups with the NGOs & Government bodies focuses on talent identification through its scouting program and talent nurturing via the IFF – BBFS Scholarship Program.

== See also ==
- Youth League (India)
