= Lonestar Kashmir FC =

Indian association football club based in Srinagar

Lonestar Kashmir
- Full name: Lonestar Kashmir Football Club
- Nickname: Lonestar
- Short name: LKFC
- Founded: 2013; 13 years ago
- Ground: TRC Turf Ground
- Capacity: 10,000
- League: JKFA Professional League
Home colours	Away colours

Lonestar Kashmir Football Club (also known as Lone Star or LKFC) is an Indian professional football club based in Srinagar, Jammu and Kashmir. Founded in 2013, the club previously competed in the I-League 2nd Division, and currently participates in the JKFA Professional League, the fifth tier of the Indian football league system. Lonestar first competed professionally when they were part of the 2015 I-League 2nd Division. The club primarily uses TRCG Stadium as home ground.

== History ==
=== Formation and journey ===
Lonestar Kashmir Football Club was founded in 2013 and is affiliated with the Jammu & Kashmir Football Association (JKFA). The club participates in various state and regional tournaments. In 2013, LoneStar Group became a primary sponsor of the team, and registered it as a private company to fulfil AIFF club licensing criteria. At the end of the 2013 season, LoneStar Group registered KFC under the Companies Act as per the AIFF Club licensing criteria. Popularly known as Kashmir FC, Lonestar Kashmir Football Club is a dream project of Iftikhar Ahmed Lone, its founder and chairman.

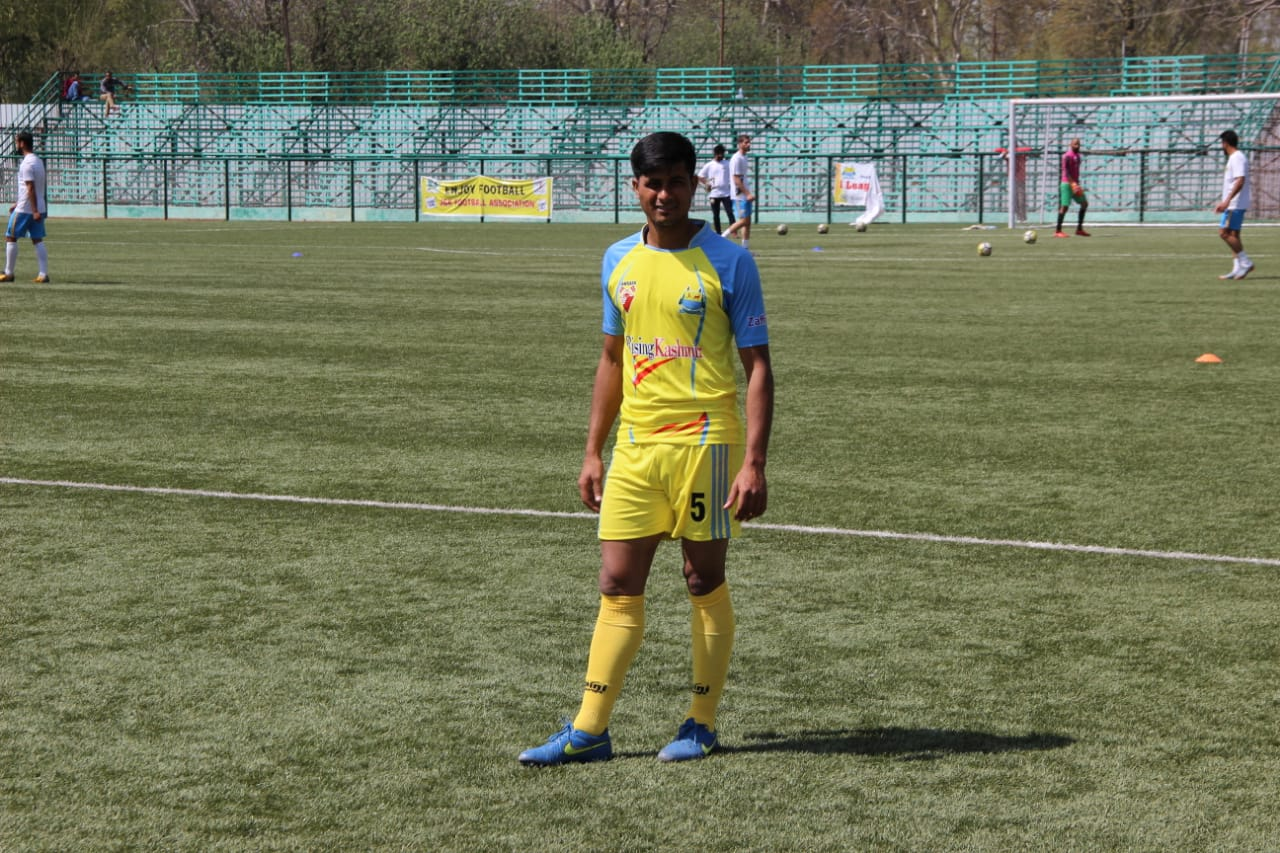
Lonestar Kashmir players training at the TRC Turf Ground in July 2018.

The club, first of its kind in the state, has been floated to promote football amongst the talented youth of the Jammu & Kashmir. A successful businessman, having established Lonestar as a global brand of Kashmiri handicrafts and jewellery in the middle-east and many European countries, Iftikhar returned to the valley. In quest for self-actualization, once a college-level footballer had the idea to introduce a Kashmir-based club in the professional football map of the country, thus Lonestar Kashmir FC came into being. The club's biggest achievements were emerging as the runners-up of the I-League 2nd Division in 2015, and 2015–16 season, though they didn't managed the top spot of the league and never qualified for the I-League, one of India's top-flight football leagues. Mozin Shah emerged as top Indian scorer for the club with six goals in 18 matches. The 2016–17 season was not suitable for them as they bowed out from Group stages, finishing on bottom with 2 points in 9 matches.

In 2017, they participated in 15th Police Martyrs Memorial Football Tournament, which was held at the TRC Turf Ground. In October 2018, they took part in another state tournament J&K Invitational Cup but could not succeed.

=== 2020–present ===
Lonestar Kashmir later participated in the JKFA Professional League during its inaugural 2020–21 season. Later they took part in the Real Kashmir Cup in 2021 and reached to the semi-finals. In May 2021, the club announced that Kashmir Observer will be their official media partner for the 2020–21 season. The following season in July 2021, Rogelio Juárez Robinson became the first Panamanian footballer to sign with Lonestar from Jamaican side Mount Pleasant Football Academy.

In July 2021, the club participated in the inaugural season of JKFA Professional League, the first professional league in the Indian state of Jammu and Kashmir, organised by Jammu and Kashmir Football Association (JKFA) and J&K Sports Council. They finished on sixth place. In 2022, Lonestar Kashmir reached semi-finals of Christmas Gold Cup.

== Rivalry ==
Lonestar Kashmir has a rivalry with their fellow Jammu & Kashmir-based club Real Kashmir FC. The team has also participated in the inaugural 2020–21 Real Kashmir Cup, which was actually hosted by Real Kashmir FC at the TRC Turf Ground.

== Stadium ==
Lonestar Kashmir uses the TRC Polo Synthetic Turf Ground in Srinagar for their home matches, which has a seating capacity of 11,000 spectators. Since 2015, the ground is being used in I-League 2nd Division for Lonestar, and I-League for Real Kashmir. It is operated by Jammu & Kashmir Football Association, and was renovated in 2015.

During the 2018–19 I-League 2nd Division, Lonestar briefly moved to Shri Mata Vaishno Devi Shrine Board sports complex in Katra, due to security reasons.

== Coaching history ==
As of 14 February 2020

Name	Nationality	From	To	P	W	D	L	GF	GA	Win%	Ref.
Hilal Rasool	India	2015	2017	14	8	3	3	22	14	57.14	
Clebson Duarte da Silva	Brazil	2018	2018	9	0	2	7	9	18	0.00	
Emerson Ricardo Alcântara	Brazil	2018	2019								
Miki Lladó	Spain	2019	2019	7	1	2	4	8	13	14.29	
Kenichi Yatsuhashi	Japan	2019	2020	7	1	2	4	8	13	14.29	
Chandan Rathod	India	2021	2023	0	0	0	0	0	0	—	

== Former players ==
=== Foreign players ===
- (Ivory Coast) Lancine Touré (2017)
- (France) Alexandre Tabillon (2017–2018)
- (Bhutan) Lhendup Dorji (2019)
- (Nigeria) Adeyemi Wahab Lasisi (2019)
- (Nigeria) Jagaba Hamza (2019–2021)
- (Cameroon) Maxwell Ellon (2019–2020)
- (Panama) Rogelio Juárez (2021)

== Youth and academy ==
U15 team of Lonestar Kashmir took part in Hero U15 I-League, played in the final round too. In 2014, the club launched its U19 team to participate in the Elite League (India). The U19 team was first participated in the league during the 2014–15 I-League U19 season (group D – rest of India zone) and moved to final round. The club also operates youth women's section and academies.

== Honours ==
=== League ===
- I-League 2nd Division
  - Runners-up (2): 2014–15, 2015–16
- J&K Premier Football League
  - Runners-up (1): 2017
- JK Bank & Khyber Premier League
  - Runners-up (1): 2015

=== Cup ===
- J&K Police Martyrs Memorial Cup
  - Runners-up (1): 2017

== See also ==
- List of football clubs in India
- Sports in Jammu and Kashmir
