= Barasat Stadium =

Football stadium in Barasat, India

Barasat District Sports Stadium
- বিদ্যাসাগর ক্রীড়াঙ্গন
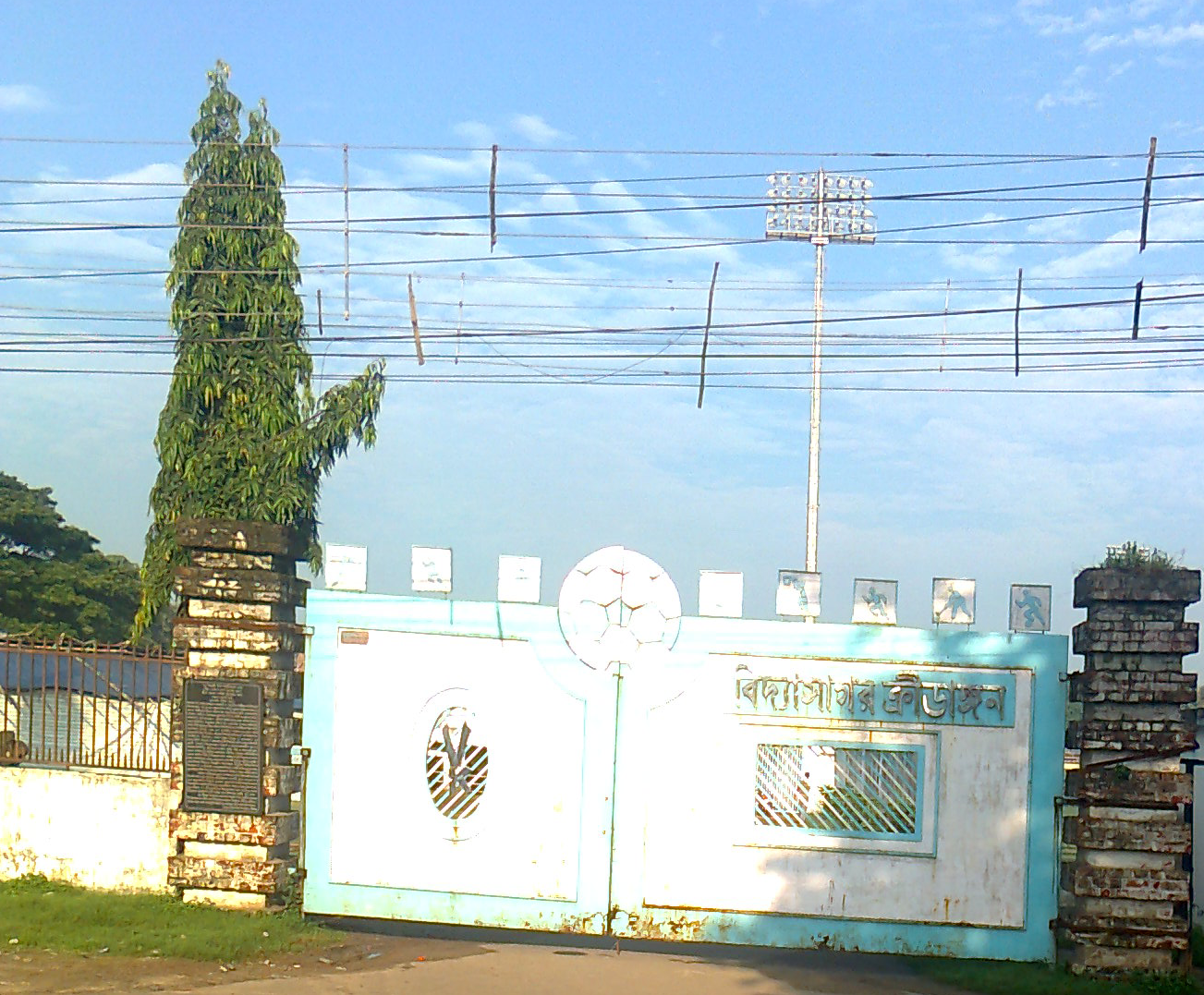
- Interactive map of Barasat District Sports Stadium
- Location: Barasat, Greater Kolkata, West Bengal, India
- Coordinates: 22°43′03.687″N 88°28′43.12″E
- Owner: Barasat Municipality
- Operator: Indian Football Association
- Capacity: 20,000
- Surface: Astro-turf
- Field size: 105 x 68 metres

Tenants
- Calcutta Football League; West Bengal football team Rainbow AC

Barasat District Sports Stadiumor simply Barasat Stadium, also known as Vidyasagar Krirangan, is a football stadium in Barasat, North 24 Parganas, West Bengal. It is used mostly for Calcutta Football League matches. It is also used for several district-level, state-level and sometimes national-level tournaments. The stadium currently holds around 15,000 spectators, has four floodlight towers, as well as air conditioned function and changing rooms. The artificial turf at the stadium has achieved a two-star rating from FIFA.

Since the 2014–15 season, the stadium has hosted the home matches of Mohun Bagan and East Bengal in the I-League.
