= 2023–24 TRAU FC season =

2023–24 football season for TRAU Football Club

TRAU FC
2023–24 season
- Head coach: L. Nandakumar Singh
- Stadium: Kalyani Stadium
- I-League: 13th
- Top goalscorer: League: Danish Aribam (6); All: Danish Aribam (6)
- Highest home attendance: 512 (v. Mohammedan, 17 February 2024)
- Lowest home attendance: 100 (v. Aizawl, 6 December 2023)
- Average home league attendance: 255

The 2023–24 season was the 69th season of TRAU FC in existence and fifth season in the I-League.

== First-team squad ==
As of 31 January 2024

Note: Flags indicate national team as defined under FIFA eligibility rules; some limited exceptions apply. Players may hold more than one non-FIFA nationality.

No.	Pos.	Nation	Player
1	GK	IND	Salam Sanaton Singh
2	DF	IND	Laishram Chingkheinganba
3	DF	SKN	Gerard Williams
4	DF	IND	Sunil B
5	DF	IND	Meitankeishangbam Clinton
6	MF	IND	Md Fayazuddin
7	FW	IND	Liton Shil
8	MF	IND	Telen Suranjit
10	MF	IND	Khumanthem Arun Singh
12	DF	IND	Thounaojam Thomas
13	MF	IND	TH Hriivei Carlos Pao
14	MF	IND	Thounaojam Rohit
15	MF	IND	Premjit Singh
16	MF	IND	Prabin Khangembam
18	MF	IND	Danish Aribam

No.	Pos.	Nation	Player
20	FW	IND	Moirangthem Malemnganba
21	FW	IND	Soraisam Robinson Singh
22	MF	IND	Deepak Singh
23	DF	IND	Naorem James Singh
24	GK	IND	Mithun Samanta
25	FW	IND	Shitaljit Atom
28	MF	UZB	Sardor Jakhonov
30	MF	GHA	Ben Quansah
32	DF	IND	Manash Protim Gogoi
33	DF	IND	Pritam Kumar Singh
37	FW	GHA	Isahak Nuhu Seidu
50	GK	IND	Aaryan Anjaneya
69	FW	IND	Japes Nongthambam
77	MF	IND	Bidyananda Singh
99	MF	IND	Sapam Bishorjit

== Transfers in ==
Date from	Position	Nationality	Name	From	Fee	Ref.
18 August 2023	FW	(India)	Soraisam Robinson Singh	(India) Goa Reserves	Free Agent	
23 August 2023	FW	(Brazil)	Willian Reis	(Brazil) São Caetano	Free Agent	
23 August 2023	DF	(Brazil)	Thawan Marcos	(Brazil) Campinense-PB	Free Agent	
26 August 2023	GK	(India)	Mithun Samanta	(India) Mohammedan	Free Agent	
31 August 2023	MF	(India)	Deepak Singh	(India) Army Red	Free Agent	
31 August 2023	FW	(India)	Liton Shil	(India) Army Red	Free Agent	
02 September 2023	DF	(India)	Sunil B	(India) Army Red	Free Agent	
03 September 2023	DF	(India)	Pritam Kumar Singh	(India) East Bengal	Free Agent	
10 September 2023	MF	(Ghana)	Abraham Okyere	(Belgium) K Beerschot VA	Free Agent	
17 September 2023	FW	(Senegal)	Ibrahima Baldé	(Turkey) Boluspor	Free Agent	
31 January 2024	MF	(Uzbekistan)	Sardor Jakhonov	(Tajikistan) Regar-TadAZ	Free Agent	
31 January 2024	FW	(Ghana)	Isahak Nuhu Seidu		Free Agent	

== Transfers out ==
Date from	Position	Nationality	Name	To	Fee	Ref.
20 June 2023	DF	(India)	Naresh Singh	Rajasthan United	Free Transfer	
26 June 2023	LW	(India)	Sagolsem Bikash Singh	Kerala Blasters	Free Transfer	
07 July 2023	MF	(India)	Meitalkeishangbam Roger	Mohammedan	Free Transfer	
07 July 2023	MF	(India)	Shougrakpam Netrajit		Free Transfer	
07 July 2023	MF	(India)	Kishan Singh		Free Transfer	
07 July 2023	MF	(India)	Baoringdao Bodo		Free Transfer	
07 July 2023	DF	(India)	Shoib Akhtar		Free Transfer	
07 July 2023	MF	(India)	Sorokhaibam Prikanta		Free Transfer	
07 July 2023	DF	(India)	Rishi Rajput		Free Transfer	
07 July 2023	MF	(India)	Laishram Milan Singh		Free Transfer	
07 July 2023	MF	(India)	Khanngam Horam		Free Transfer	
07 July 2023	GK	(India)	Lunkhominlenmang Haokip		Free Transfer	
07 July 2023	DF	(India)	Roshan Singh		Free Transfer	
07 July 2023	FW	(Ghana)	Nana Poku		Free Transfer	
07 July 2023	MF	(India)	Ngangbam Pacha Singh		Free Transfer	
07 July 2023	MF	(India)	Timothy Thangkhol		Free Transfer	
10 July 2023	FW	(India)	Salam Johnson Singh	Bengaluru FC	Free Transfer	
13 July 2023	DF	(India)	Salam Ranjan Singh	Gokulam Kerala	Free Transfer	
14 July 2023	GK	(India)	Bishorjit Singh	Gokulam Kerala	Free Transfer	
17 July 2023	DF	(India)	Buanthanglun Samte	NorthEast United	Free Transfer	
3 August 2023	DF	(Ghana)	Godfred Yeboah	(Lebanon) Ahli Nabatieh	Free Transfer	
21 August 2023	FW	(Tajikistan)	Komron Tursunov	Gokulam Kerala	Free Transfer	
30 August 2023	DF	(Brazil)	Gérson Vieira	(Hong Kong) Tai Po	Free Transfer	
04 September 2023	MF	(India)	Sarif Khan	NEROCA	Free Transfer	
01 January 2024	DF	(Brazil)	Thawan Marcos	(Brazil) Iporá	Free Transfer	
01 January 2024	FW	(Brazil)	Willian Reis		Free Transfer	
01 January 2024	MF	(Ghana)	Abraham Okyere		Free Transfer	
01 January 2024	FW	(Senegal)	Ibrahima Baldé		Free Transfer	

== Pre-season and friendlies ==
19 August 2023 Friendly	TRAU	5–1	KAGO
16:00 IST

27 August 2023 Friendly	TRAU	0–1	Manipur IX	Imphal
16:00 IST				Stadium: Khuman Lampak Main Stadium

10 September 2023 Friendly	TRAU	3–1	Manipur IX	Imphal
08:00 IST				Stadium: Khuman Lampak Main Stadium

21 October 2023 Friendly	KLASA	0–2	TRAU	Imphal
08:00 IST				Stadium: Khuman Lampak Main Stadium

25 October 2023 Friendly	TRAU	1–2	KLASA	Imphal
14:30 IST				Stadium: Khuman Lampak Main Stadium

== Competitions ==
=== I-League ===
==== League table ====
Pos	Team	Pld	W	D	L	GF	GA	GD	Pts	Qualification
9	Namdhari	24	7	6	11	29	40	−11	27	
10	Aizawl	22	6	7	9	36	35	+1	25	
11	Rajasthan United	24	6	7	11	40	63	−23	25	
12	NEROCA (R)	23	4	2	17	26	61	−35	14	Relegation to I-League 2
13	TRAU (R)	23	4	1	18	26	64	−38	13	Relegation to I-League 2

Source: I-League
Rules for classification: 1) Points; 2) Head-to-head points; 3) Head-to-head goal difference; 4) Total goal difference; 5) Total number of goals scored; 6) drawing of lots
(Note: Head-to-head record is used only after all the matches between the teams in question have been played).
(R) Relegated

==== Matches ====
Note: I-League announced the fixtures for the 2023–24 season on 6 October 2023.

30 October 2023 1	Delhi	1–1	TRAU	Bhaini Sahib
14:00 IST	Ba. Singh 47'	Report	Liton Shil 29'	Stadium: Namdhari Stadium; Attendance: 600; Referee: Ashish Tiwari; Man of the Match: Balwant Singh (Delhi)

4 November 2023 2	Real Kashmir	1–0	TRAU	Srinagar
14:00 IST	Laldinpuia 45'	Report		Stadium: TRC Turf Ground; Attendance: 6,200; Referee: Jatinder Singh; Man of the Match: Jeremy Laldinpuia (Real Kashmir)

7 November 2023 3	Mohammedan	6–0	TRAU	Kalyani
19:00 IST	Lalhlansanga 3', 10'; Adjei 29'; Kosimov 37'; Fanai 63'; Lalmuanpuia 90+5'	Report		Stadium: Naihati Stadium; Attendance: 1,773; Referee: Williams Joy Koshy; Man of the Match: Joseph Adjei

13 November 2023 4	TRAU	0–2	Gokulam Kerala	Kalyani
16:30 IST		Report	Álex Sánchez 1', 16'	Stadium: Kalyani Stadium; Attendance: 0 Referee: Dipu Roy; Man of the Match: Álex Sánchez (Gokulam Kerala)

19 November 2023 5	TRAU	0–5	Sreenidi Deccan	Kalyani
16:30 IST		Report	G. Singh 42'; J. Singh 48', 58'; Lalromawia 66'; Castañeda 90+3'	Stadium: Kalyani Stadium; Attendance: 315; Referee: K. Lyngdoh Nongum; Man of the Match: Jagdeep Singh (Sreenidi Deccan)

22 November 2023 6	Churchill Brothers	4–0	TRAU	Vasco
19:00 IST	Dichiara 18'; Costa 33'; Louis 70' (pen.); Callegari 84'	Report		Stadium: Tilak Maidan; Attendance: 1,895; Referee: K. Lyngdoh Nongum; Man of the Match: Ricardo Dichiara (Churchill Brothers)

25 November 2023 7	Shillong Lajong	2–1	TRAU	Shillong
16:30 IST	Nongbri 18' (pen.); Thounaojam Thomas 86' (o.g.)	Report	Soraisam Robinson Singh 13'	Stadium: SSA Stadium; Attendance: 6,718; Referee: Ashish Tiwari; Man of the Match: Hardy Nongbri (Shillong Lajong)

7 December 2023 8	TRAU	1–5	Aizawl	Kalyani
19:00 IST	Soraisam Robinson 13'	Report	Lalbiaknia 16' (pen.), 23'; Williams 51' (o.g.); Zoherliana 53', 57'	Stadium: Kalyani Stadium; Attendance: 100; Referee: Tanmoy Dhar; Man of the Match: Joe Zoherliana (Aizawl)

10 December 2023 9	TRAU	3–0	Inter Kashi	Kalyani
16:30 IST	Danish Aribam 9'; Deepak Singh 22'; Okyere 76'	Report		Stadium: Kalyani Stadium; Attendance: 128; Referee: Lalit Singh Rawat; Man of the Match: Danish Aribam (TRAU)

17 December 2023 10	TRAU	1–2	Namdhari	Kalyani
16:30 IST	Danish Aribam 41'	Report	Saurabh Bhanwala 36'; Manvir Singh 76'	Stadium: Kalyani Stadium; Attendance: 422; Referee: Lakshay; Man of the Match: Manvir Singh (Namdhari)

22 December 2023 11	Rajasthan United	5–4	TRAU	Hyderabad
19:00 IST	William 21'; Denzell 58', 68', 90+6'; Novin Gurung 85'		Abraham Okyere 9'; Danish Aribam 31'; Deepak Singh 53'; Jefferson Oliveira 55' (o.g.)	Stadium: Deccan Arena

11 February 2024 12	TRAU	5–3	Delhi	Kalyani
19:00 IST	Liton shil 5', 73'; Aribam 64', 71' (pen.); R. Singh 75'	Report	B. Singh 2'; Muratov 41'; Barboza 59' (pen.)	Stadium: Kalyani Stadium; Attendance: 128; Referee: Pratik Mondal; Man of the Match: Danish Aribam (TRAU)

14 February 2024 13	Sreenidi Deccan	3–0	TRAU	Hyderabad
16:30 IST	Hassan 35'; Castañeda 44'; Vanlalremdika 90+3'	Report		Stadium: Deccan Arena; Attendance: 123; Referee: Suresh Devraj; Man of the Match: David Castañeda (Sreenidi Deccan)

17 February 2024 14	TRAU	0–2	Mohammedan	Kalyani
16:30 IST		Report	Hernández 45+1', 90+1'	Stadium: Kalyani Stadium; Attendance: 512; Referee: Mrutyunjay L. Amatya; Man of the Match: Eddie Hernández (Mohammedan)

25 February 2024 15	TRAU	1–2	Shillong Lajong	Imphal
16:30 IST	Issahak Nuhu Seidu 47'	Report	Allen Lyngdoh 59'; Marcos Silva 72'	Stadium: Khuman Lampak Main Stadium; Attendance: 259; Referee: Suresh Devaraj; Man of the Match: Manash Gogoi (TRAU)

8 March 2024 16	Inter Kashi	6–3	TRAU	Kalyani
19:00 IST	Nikum 12'; Ajsal 26', 55'; Lamela 78'; Mohammed Asif 90'; Gianni dos Santos 90+8'	Report	Sardor Jakhonov 43' (pen.); Issahak Nuhu Seidu 63', 85'	Stadium: Kalyani Stadium; Attendance: 752; Referee: Jatinder Singh; Man of the Match: Muhammad Ajsal (Inter Kashi)

12 March 2024 17	Namdhari	1–2	TRAU	Bhaini Ala
15:30 IST	Harmanp. Singh 77'	Report	Harmanj. Singh 10' (o.g.); Issahak Nuhu Seidu 34'	Stadium: Namdhari Stadium; Attendance: 500; Referee: Mrutyunjay Amatya; Man of the Match: Pritam Kumar Singh (TRAU)

15 March 2024 18	TRAU	0–2	Rajasthan United	Kalyani
16:30 IST		Report	Denzell 4'; Pauliankhum 66'	Stadium: Kalyani Stadium; Attendance: 222; Referee: Ashish Tiwari; Man of the Match: Richardson Denzell (Rajasthan United)

21 March 2024 19	NEROCA	1–0	TRAU	Shillong
16:30 IST	Kromah 79'	Report		Stadium: SSA Stadium; Attendance: 100; Referee: Akashkumar Mehta; Man of the Match: Ansumana Kromah (NEROCA)

24 March 2024 20	TRAU	1–2	NEROCA	Kalyani
19:00 IST	TS Singh 77'	Report	Kromah 48' (pen.); LD Singh 65'	Stadium: Kalyani Stadium; Attendance: 152; Referee: Mithun Kumar Kundu; Man of the Match: Lourembam David Singh (NEROCA)

1 April 2024 21	TRAU	0–2	Churchill Brothers	Kalyani
19:00 IST		Report	Fernandes 1'; Sharma 45+2' (o.g.)	Stadium: Kalyani Stadium; Attendance: 500; Referee: Tanmoy Dhar; Man of the Match: Martín Cháves (Churchill Brothers)

6 April 2024 22	TRAU	2–1	Real Kashmir	Kalyani
16:30 IST	Aribam 56'; R. Singh 90+9'	Report	Lomba 59'	Stadium: Kalyani Stadium; Attendance: 123; Referee: Lalit Singh Rawat; Man of the Match: Robinson Singh (TRAU)

9 April 2024 23	Aizawl	Cancelled	TRAU	Aizawl
19:00 IST				Stadium: Rajiv Gandhi Stadium

12 April 2024 24	Gokulam Kerala	6–1	TRAU	Kozhikode
16:30 IST	Sánchez 19'; Noufal 28', 34'; Tursunov 39'; Babović 90+2'; Stojanović 90+5' (pen.)	Report	Issahak 61' (pen.)	Stadium: EMS Corporation Stadium; Attendance: 600; Referee: K. Ramdasan; Man of the Match: Noufal PN (Gokulam Kerala)

== Statistics ==
=== Goalscorers ===
Rank	No.	Pos.	Nat.	Name	I League	Super Cup	Total
1	18	MF	(India)	Danish Aribam	5	0	5
2	21	FW	(India)	Soraisam Robinson Singh	3	0	3
2	7	MF	(India)	Liton Shil	3	0	3
3	19	MF	(Ghana)	Abraham Okyere	2	0	2
3	22	MF	(India)	Deepak Singh	2	0	2
