= 2022–23 TRAU FC season =

2022–23 football season for TRAU Football Club

TRAU FC
2022–23 season
- Head coach: L.Nandakumar Singh
- I-League: 4th out of 12
- AIFF Super Cup: Qualifiers
- Durand Cup: Group stage

The 2022–23 season was the 68th season of TRAU FC in existence and fourth season in the I-League. This season of the I-League witnesses the return of the home-away format of the matches similar to that of the 2019–20 I-League season after a break of two years due to the COVID-19 pandemic in the country.

== First-team squad ==
As of 1 September 2022

Note: Flags indicate national team as defined under FIFA eligibility rules; some limited exceptions apply. Players may hold more than one non-FIFA nationality.

No.	Pos.	Nation	Player
1	GK	IND	Bishorjit Singh
2	DF	IND	Manash Protim Gogoi
3	DF	SKN	Gerard Williams
4	DF	BRA	Gérson Vieira
5	DF	GHA	Godfred Yeboah
6	MF	IND	Shougrakpam Netrajit Singh
8	MF	IND	Kishan Singh
9	MF	IND	Danish Aribam
10	FW	TJK	Komron Tursunov (captain)
11	FW	IND	Baoringdao Bodo
12	DF	IND	Shoib Akhtar
13	MF	IND	Sapam Bishorjit
14	MF	IND	Sorokhaibam Prikanta Singh
15	DF	IND	Rishi Rajput
16	MF	IND	Laishram Milan Singh
18	MF	IND	Meitalkeishangbam Roger
19	DF	IND	Naresh Singh
20	MF	IND	Khanngam Horam
21	GK	IND	Lunkhominlenmang Haokip
22	DF	IND	Buanthanglun Samte

No.	Pos.	Nation	Player
23	DF	IND	Roshan Singh
24	DF	IND	Clinton Khuman
25	MF	IND	Khumanthem Arun Singh
28	FW	IND	Nongthongbam Singh
29	MF	IND	Bikash Singh Sagolshem
30	FW	GHA	Nana Poku
31	MF	IND	Ngangbam Pacha Singh
32	MF	IND	Timothy Thangkholal
33	FW	IND	Premkumar Meitei
35	FW	IND	Salam Singh
—	FW	IND	Japes Nongthambam
—	FW	IND	Premjit Singh

== Transfers in ==
Date from	Position	Nationality	Name	From	Fee	Ref.
30 July 2022	FW	(Ghana)	Nana Poku	(Indonesia) Dewa United		
31 July 2022	FW	(India)	Premjit Singh	(India) Odisha		
04 August 2022	FW	(Tajikistan)	Komron Tursunov	(India) Churchill Brothers		
27 August 2022	FW	(India)	Sakir Ali	(India) Jamshepur F.C		
16 September 2022	DF	(Ghana)	Godfred Yeboah	(Ghana) Karela United		
31 October 2022	DF	(Brazil)	Gérson Vieira	(Brazil) Aimoré		

== Transfers out ==
Date from	Position	Nationality	Name	To	Fee	Ref.
01 July 2022	GK	(India)	Amrit Gope	Bengaluru	Released	

== Pre-season and friendlies ==
28 September 2022 Friendly	NorthEast United	4–3	TRAU	Guwahati
15:30 IST	Romain; Bora; Evans; Pragyan	Report		Stadium: Indira Gandhi Athletic Stadium

== Competitions ==
=== I-League ===
==== League table ====
Pos	Team	Pld	W	D	L	GF	GA	GD	Pts
2	Sreenidi Deccan	22	13	3	6	44	29	+15	42
3	Gokulam Kerala	22	12	3	7	26	14	+12	39
4	TRAU	22	11	2	9	34	34	0	35
5	Real Kashmir	22	9	7	6	27	25	+2	34
6	Churchill Brothers	22	9	6	7	34	24	+10	33

Source: I-League
Rules for classification: 1) points; 2) head-to-head points; 3) head-to-head goal difference; 4) goal difference; 5) number of goals scored; 6) drawing of lots

==== Matches ====
15 November 2022 1	Aizawl	1–1	TRAU FC	Aizawl
14.00 IST			Bikash Singh Sagolshem 18'	Stadium: Rajiv Gandhi Stadium

21 November 2022 2	TRAU FC	3–0	Mumbai Kenkre	Imphal
14.00 IST	Nana Poku 41'; Komron Tursunov 75'; Own Goal 87'			Stadium: Khuman Lampak Main Stadium

24 November 2022 3	Sreenidi Deccan	1–0	TRAU FC	Hyderabad
14.00 IST				Stadium: Deccan Arena

27 November 2022 4	Mohammedan	1–0	TRAU FC	Kolkata
18.00 IST				Stadium: Kishore Bharati Krirangan

1 December 2022 5	Real Kashmir	3–2	TRAU FC	Srinagar
18.00 IST			Komron Tursunov 30'; Salam Singh 45+1'	Stadium: TRC Turf Ground

8 December 2022 6	TRAU FC	2–0	RoundGlass Punjab	Imphal
14.00 IST	Buanthanglun Samte 25'; Salam Singh 55'			Stadium: Khuman Lampak Main Stadium

11 December 2022 7	TRAU FC	2–1	NEROCA	Imphal
14.00 IST	Gérson Vieira 47'; Godfred Yeboah 90+7'			Stadium: Khuman Lampak Main Stadium

15 December 2022 8	TRAU FC	3–1	Rajasthan United	Imphal
14.00 IST	Komron Tursunov 33', 45+1'; Baoringdao Bodo 70'			Stadium: Khuman Lampak Main Stadium

20 December 2022 9	Churchill Brothers	6–1	TRAU FC	Panaji
16.30 IST				Stadium: GMC Athletic Stadium

5 January 2023 10	TRAU FC	2–0	Sudeva Delhi	Imphal
16.30 IST				Stadium: Khuman Lampak Main Stadium

15 January 2023 11	Gokulam Kerala	1–2	TRAU	Manjeri
16.30 IST	Thahir Zaman 86'	Report	Manash Protim Gogoi 57'; Salam Johnson Singh 78'	Stadium: Payyanad Stadium; Attendance: 1,550; Referee: Tanmoy Dhar; Man of the Match: Manash Protim Gogoi (TRAU)

18 January 2023 12	NEROCA	3–1	TRAU FC	Imphal
16.30 IST				Stadium: Khuman Lampak Main Stadium

28 January 2023 13	Rajasthan United	1–2	TRAU FC	New Delhi
14.00 IST	Kharpan 19'; Britto (yellow card) 90+2' (yellow-red card) 90+4'	Report	S. Johnson Singh 14'; Tursunov 40'; G. Yeboah (yellow card) 90+2'	Stadium: Ambedkar Stadium; Attendance: 1,129; Referee: Jehrul Islam; Man of the Match: Salam Johnson Singh (TRAU)

3 February 2023 14	TRAU FC	0–0	Mohammedan	Imphal
16:30 IST	Fernandinho (yellow card) 32'	Report	N'Diaye (yellow card) 60'	Stadium: Khuman Lampak Main Stadium; Attendance: 1,000; Referee: Ashish Tiwari; Man of the Match: Sairuat Kima (Mohammedan)

7 February 2023 15	TRAU	1-2	Sreenidi Deccan	Imphal
14.00 IST	Komron Tursunov (yellow card) 15'; Gerard Williams (yellow card) 59'; Gérson Vieira (yellow card) 65'; Salam Johnson Singh (yellow card) 70'; Pritam Singh 90+4'	Report	Arijit Bagui (yellow card) 7'; Asheer Akhtar 37'; Shahabaaz Khan (yellow card) 66'; Phalguni Singh 90+2'	Stadium: Khuman Lampak Main Stadium; Attendance: 2,876; Referee: JATINDER SINGH; Man of the Match: Asheer Akhtar (Sreenidi Deccan)

10 February 2023 16	TRAU FC	3-2	Churchill Brothers	Imphal
16.30 IST	Billu Teli 57'; Komron Tursunov 67'; Fernandinho 78'			Stadium: Khuman Lampak Main Stadium

17 February 2023 17	TRAU FC	3-1	Aizawl	Imphal
16.30 IST	Fernandinho 6'; Gérson Vieira 18'; Salam Johnson Singh 47'			Stadium: Khuman Lampak Main Stadium

22 February 2023 18	Sudeva Delhi	2–0	TRAU FC	New Delhi
16.30 IST			Bidyananda Singh 42'	Stadium: Chhatrasal Stadium

26 February 2023 19	TRAU FC	0–2	Real Kashmir	Imphal
14.00 IST				Stadium: Khuman Lampak Main Stadium

2 March 2023 20	TRAU FC	1-0	Gokulam Kerala	Imphal
19.00 IST	Gérson Vieira 60'	Report	Sreekuttan VS (yellow card) 31'; Jijo Joseph (yellow card) 36'; Sergio Mendigutxia (yellow card) 51'	Stadium: Khuman Lampak Main Stadium; Attendance: 1,308; Referee: WILLIAMS JOY KOSHY; Man of the Match: Salam Johnson Singh (TRAU)

21 November 2022 21	Mumbai Kenkre	2–4	TRAU FC	Mumbai
14.00 IST			Fernandinho 13'; Baoringdao Bodo 66' 73'; Buanthanglun Samte 79'	Stadium: Cooperage Ground

12 March 2023 22	RoundGlass Punjab	2–0	TRAU FC	Panchkula
19.00 IST	Valpuia (yellow card) 31'; Majcen 36', 49' (yellow card) 50'; Ravi (yellow card) 84'; Sampingiraj (yellow card) 90+3'	Report	Fernandinho (yellow card) 31'; Williams (yellow card) 42'	Stadium: Tau Devi Lal Stadium; Attendance: 6,327; Referee: Aditya Purkayastha; Man of the Match: Luka Majcen (RoundGlass Punjab)

=== Group C ===
Pos	Team	Pld	W	D	L	GF	GA	GD	Pts	Qualification	HYD	CHE	ARR	NER	TRA
1	Hyderabad	4	3	0	1	8	2	+6	9	Qualify for the Knockout stage	—	3–1	—	—	—
2	Chennaiyin	4	2	1	1	9	6	+3	7	Qualify for the Knockout stage	—	—	2–2	—	—
3	Army Red	4	1	2	1	4	4	0	5		1–0	—	—	0–0	—
4	NEROCA (H)	4	1	1	2	3	6	−3	4		0–3	0–2	—	—	3–1
5	TRAU (H)	4	1	0	3	4	10	−6	3		0–2	1–4	2–1	—	—

Source: Sportstar
Rules for classification: 1) points; 2) head-to-head points; 3) head-to-head goal difference; 4) goal difference; 5) number of goals scored; 6) drawing of lots
(H) Hosts

==== Matches ====
18 August 2022 1	NEROCA	3–1	TRAU	Imphal
18.00 IST	Ragui 16'; Shimray 36'; Chidi 50'; James (yellow card) 71'	Report	Tursunov 19'; Samte (yellow card) 35'	Stadium: Khuman Lampak Stadium; Referee: Umesh Bora; Man of the Match: Naorem Tondomba Singh (NEROCA)

22 August 2022 2	TRAU	0–2	Hyderabad	Imphal
15.00 IST	Singh (yellow card) 60'; Johnson (yellow card) 67'	Report	D'Silva (yellow card) 9'; Jongte (yellow card) 11'; Narzary 27'; Herrera 53'; Sana (yellow card) 55'	Stadium: Khuman Lampak Stadium; Referee: Pratik Mondal; Man of the Match: Hitesh Sharma (Hyderabad)

28 August 2022 3	TRAU	2–1	Army Red	Imphal
15.00 IST	Bodo 81'; Milan 90'; Joysana (yellow card) 90+2'	Report	Shil 35'; Kamei (yellow card) 58'	Stadium: Khuman Lampak Stadium; Referee: Pratik Mondal; Man of the Match: Baoringdao Bodo (TRAU)

1 September 2022 4	TRAU	1–4	Chennaiyin	Imphal
18.00 IST	Roshan (yellow card) 24'; Salam (yellow card) 36' (red card) 36'; Tursunov 45' (pen.)	Report	Slišković 1', 55'; Karikari 19' (pen.); Hakhamaneshi 51'	Stadium: Khuman Lampak Stadium; Referee: Rowan Arumughan; Man of the Match: Julius Düker (Chennaiyin)

=== Super Cup ===
After finishing 4th in the I-League, Malabarians will have to play a qualifier against 7th-ranked Aizawl to earn a place in the group stage.

=== Qualifiers ===
6 April 2023 Q-3	TRAU	0–1	Aizawl	Manjeri
17:00 IST		Report	Veras 64'	Stadium: Payyanad Stadium; Attendance: 772; Referee: Aditya Purkayastha; Man of the Match: Ivan Veras (Aizawl)

== Statistics ==
=== Goal Scorers ===
Rank	No.	Pos.	Nat.	Name	I League	Durand Cup	Super Cup	Total
1	10	FW	(Tajikistan)	Komron Tursunov	8	2	0	10
2	35	FW	(India)	Salam Singh	5	0	0	5
3	11	FW	(India)	Baoringdao Bodo	3	1	0	4
4	4	DF	(Brazil)	Gérson Vieira	3	0	0	3
4	29	MF	(India)	Bikash Singh Sagolshem	3	0	0	3
4	94	MF	(Brazil)	Fernandinho	3	0	0	3
7	22	DF	(India)	Buanthanglun Samte	2	0	0	2
7	30	FW	(Ghana)	Nana Poku	2	0	0	2
9	2	DF	(India)	Manash Protim Gogoi	1	0	0	1
9	5	DF	(Ghana)	Godfred Yeboah	1	0	0	1
9	16	MF	(India)	Laishram Milan Singh	0	1	0	1
9	17	FW	(India)	Bidyananda Singh	0	1	0	1
9	27	DF	(India)	Billu Teli	1	0	0	1
9	33	FW	(India)	Pritam Singh	1	0	0	1
