= 2021–22 TRAU FC season =

2020–21 football season for TRAU Football Club

TRAU FC
2020–21 season
- Head coach: L.Nandakumar Singh
- Average home league attendance: Closed Door

The 2021–22 season was the 67th season of TRAU FC in existence and third season in the I-League

== Squad ==
As of 4 July 2021

Note: Flags indicate national team as defined under FIFA eligibility rules; some limited exceptions apply. Players may hold more than one non-FIFA nationality.

No.	Pos.	Nation	Player
1	GK	IND	Amrit Gope
2	DF	IND	Manash Protim Gogoi
4	DF	BRA	Helder Lobato
8	MF	IND	Shougrakpam Netrajit Singh
9	FW	IND	Mayosing Khongreiwa
10	FW	IND	Seiminmang Manchong
12	MF	IND	Chongtham Kishan
14	DF	IND	Abhishek Das
15	DF	IND	Md.Abdul Salam
16	MF	IND	Sapam Bishorjit
17	FW	IND	Robinson
18	FW	IND	Bedashwor Singh
19	DF	IND	Naresh Singh
20	MF	IND	Cleaven Hmar
21	FW	NGR	Joseph Olaleye
22	DF	IND	James
23	GK	IND	H.Prasanjit Singh
24	MF	IND	Prikanta Sorokhaibam

No.	Pos.	Nation	Player
25	FW	IND	Tjuddin
26	FW	IND	Fayajuddin
28	FW	IND	Ningthoujam Olen
29	MF	IND	Yuno Richard Thaikho
30	DF	IND	Amit Tudu
32	MF	IND	Laishram Milan Singh
36	MF	IND	Meitalkeishangbam Roger
38	DF	IND	Herojit
-	MF	IND	Bikash singh Sagolshem
-	FW	IND	Joysana Nongthombam
-	FW	IND	Timothy Haokip
-	DF	IND	Roshan Singh
-	DF	IND	Mohammed Sarif Khan
-	DF	IND	Clinton Khuman
-	FW	UZB	Akobir Turaev
—	GK	IND	Manas Dubey
—	GK	IND	Soram Anganba
—	DF	IND	Shouvik Ghosh

== Transfers ==
=== Transfers in ===
Date from	Position	Nationality	Name	From	Fee	Ref.
27 June 2021	MF	(India)	Bikash singh sagolshem	(India) East Bengal (R)	None	
2 July 2021	FW	(India)	Joysana Nongthombam	(India) Chennaiyin FC B	None	
5 July 2021	FW	(India)	Khanngnam Horam	(India) NEROCA FC	None	
9 July 2021	FW	(India)	Buanthanglun Samte	(India) ATK Reserves	None	
10 July 2021	FW	(India)	Timothy Haokip	(India) ATK Reserves	None	
23 July 2021	DF	(India)	Roshan Singh	(India) Gokulam Kerala FC	None	
3 August 2021	DF	(India)	Mohamemed Sarif Khan	(India) Chennaiyin FC B	None	
23 August 2021	DF	(India)	Clinton Khuman	(India) East Bengal (R)	None	
29 August 2021	DF	(India)	Manash Protim Gogoi	(India) Jamshedpur FC	None	
29 August 2021	FW	(Uzbekistan)	Akobir Turaev	(Tajikistan) Eskhata Khujand	None	
23 September 2021	GK	(India)	Manas Dubey	(India) Hyderabad FC	Loan	

=== Transfers out ===
Date from	Position	Nationality	Name	To	Fee	Ref.
22 June 2021	MF	(India)	Vicky Meitei	NEROCA FC	Released	
23 June 2021	DF	(India)	Mohammad Abdul Salam	NEROCA FC	None	
27 June 2021	MF	(India)	Khundongbam Krishnanda	Gokulam Kerala	None	
29 June 2021	DF	(India)	Soraisham Dinesh Singh	Sreenidhi FC	None	
30 June 2021	MF	(India)	Chanso Horam	Mumbai City	Loan Spell Ends	
28 July 2021	FW	(India)	Bidyashagar Singh	Bengaluru FC	None	
3 August 2021	MF	(Tajikistan)	Komron Tursunov	(Tajikistan) FK Khujand	None	
29 August 2021	MF	(India)	Shahbaaz Khan	Sreenidhi FC	None	
6 September 2021	FW	(India)	Mayosing Khongreiwa	Sreenidhi FC	None	
8 September 2021	MF	(India)	Phalguni Konsam	Sreenidhi FC	None	

== Current technical staff ==
As of 15 March 2020.

Position	Name
Head Coach	(India) L.Nandakumar Singh
Assistant Coach	(India) KH Surmani
Goalkeeping Coach	(India) Joykumar

== Pre-season ==
16 October 2021 Friendly	NEROCA	1-1	TRAU	Imphal
16.00 IST				Stadium: Khuman Lampak Main Stadium

== Competitions ==
Competition	First match	Last match	Final position	Record							
Competition	First match	Last match	Final position	Pld	W	D	L	GF	GA	GD	Win %
I League	TBD	TBD		0	0	0	0	0	0	+0	—
Super Cup	TBD	TBD	-	0	0	0	0	0	0	+0	—
Total				0	0	0	0	0	0	+0	—

Last updated: 23 September 2021.
Source: Competitions

=== I-League ===
==== League table ====
Pos	Team	Pld	W	D	L	GF	GA	GD	Pts	Qualification
7	Rajasthan United	12	3	7	2	10	8	+2	16	Championship stage
8	Real Kashmir	12	2	7	3	18	22	−4	13	Relegation stage
9	TRAU	12	3	3	6	12	15	−3	12	Relegation stage
10	Aizawl	12	4	0	8	15	19	−4	12	Relegation stage
11	Sudeva Delhi	12	2	4	6	9	16	−7	10	Relegation stage

Source: Hero I-League
Rules for classification: 1) points; 2) head-to-head points; 3) head-to-head goal difference; 4) goal difference; 5) number of goals scored; 6) drawing of lots

Pos	Team	Pld	W	D	L	GF	GA	GD	Pts	Qualification
1	Gokulam Kerala	18	13	4	1	44	15	+29	43	Champions and qualification for the play–offs for 2023–24 AFC Cup group stage spot
2	Mohammedan	18	11	4	3	34	18	+16	37	
3	Sreenidi Deccan	18	9	5	4	27	19	+8	32	
4	Churchill Brothers	18	9	3	6	24	22	+2	30	
5	RoundGlass Punjab	18	8	4	6	33	29	+4	28	
6	Rajasthan United	18	5	7	6	16	16	0	22	
7	NEROCA	18	4	8	6	21	30	−9	20	

Source: Hero I-League
Rules for classification: 1) points; 2) head-to-head points; 3) head-to-head goal difference; 4) goal difference; 5) number of goals scored; 6) drawing of lots

Pos	Team	Pld	W	D	L	GF	GA	GD	Pts
1	Aizawl	17	7	0	10	23	26	−3	21
2	TRAU	17	4	6	7	15	17	−2	18
3	Indian Arrows	17	4	5	8	10	23	−13	17 (Note: Head-to-head standings: Indian Arrows 4 points, Sudeva Delhi 1 point.)
4	Sudeva Delhi	17	4	5	8	13	23	−10	17
5	Real Kashmir	17	2	8	7	23	31	−8	14

Source: Hero I-League
Rules for classification: 1) points; 2) head-to-head points; 3) head-to-head goal difference; 4) goal difference; 5) number of goals scored; 6) drawing of lots
Notes:

Pos	Team	Pld	W	D	L	GF	GA	GD	Pts
7	NEROCA	18	4	8	6	21	30	−9	20
8	Aizawl	17	7	0	10	23	26	−3	21
9	TRAU	17	4	6	7	15	17	−2	18
10	Indian Arrows	17	4	5	8	10	23	−13	17
11	Sudeva Delhi	17	4	5	8	13	23	−10	17

Source: Hero I-League
Rules for classification: 1) points; 2) head-to-head points; 3) head-to-head goal difference; 4) goal difference; 5) number of goals scored; 6) drawing of lots
