= 2019–20 TRAU FC season =

2019–20 season of TRAU FC

TRAU
2019–20 season
- Head Coach: Douglas Silva
- Stadium: Khuman Lampak Main Stadium
- I-League: 11th
- Durand Cup: Group Stage

The 2019–20 season is TRAU's first season in the I-League after winning the I-League 2nd Division. This season they are participating in the I-League, Durand Cup and Indian Super Cup.

== Senior team squad ==
As of 5 September 2019

Note: Flags indicate national team as defined under FIFA eligibility rules; some limited exceptions apply. Players may hold more than one non-FIFA nationality.

No.	Pos.	Nation	Player
–	GK	IND	Shayan Roy
–	GK	IND	Gurpreet Singh Chabhal
–	GK	IND	Bishorjit Singh
–	DF	IND	Rahul Das
–	DF	NGA	Oguchi Uche
–	DF	UGA	Isaac Isinde
–	DF	IND	Denechandra Meitei
–	DF	IND	Deepak Devrani
–	DF	IND	Tanmoy Ghosh
–	DF	IND	Jimmi maibam Singh
–	DF	IND	Abhishek Das
–	DF	IND	Ramandeep Singh

No.	Pos.	Nation	Player
–	MF	IND	Biaklian Paite
–	MF	IND	Robinson Singh
–	MF	IND	Loken Meitei
–	MF	IND	Abhinas Ruidas
–	MF	SKN	Gerard Williams
–	FW	BRA	Julio Cesar
–	FW	NGA	Princewell Emeka
–	FW	BRA	Marcel Sacramento
-	FW	IND	Pritam Singh
-	FW	IND	Bedashwor Singh

== Transfers ==
=== Transfers in ===
Date from	Position	Nationality	Name	From	Fee	Ref.
1 July 2019	GK	(India)	Bishorjit Singh	(India) NEROCA	none	
1 July 2019	FW	(India)	Bedashwor Singh	(India) Chennaiyin FC	none	
8 July 2019	GK	(India)	Gurpreet Singh Chabhal	(India) Aizawl	none	
13 July 2019	MF	(India)	Biaklian Paite	(India) NEROCA	none	
31 July 2019	DF	(India)	Jimmy Maibam Singh	(India) Chhinga Veng	none	
6 August 2019	MF	(India)	Robinson Singh	(India) Bengaluru FC 'B'	none	
6 August 2019	MF	(India)	Abhinas Ruidas	(India) Mohun Bagan	none	
6 August 2019	MF	(India)	Denechandra Meitei	(India) NEROCA	none	
6 August 2019	DF	(India)	Deepak Devrani	(India) Minerva Punjab	none	
6 August 2019	DF	(India)	Ramandeep Singh	(India) Minerva Punjab	none	
6 August 2019	MF	(Saint Kitts and Nevis)	Gerard Williams	(Trinidad and Tobago) W Connection	none	
1 September 2019	MF	(India)	Loken Meitei	(India) Kerala Blasters FC Reserves	none	
3 September 2019	DF	(India)	Tanmoy Ghosh	(India) South United	none	
3 September 2019	FW	(Ghana)	Abednego Tetteh	(India) Real Kashmir	none	
3 September 2019	DF	(Uganda)	Isaac Isinde	(Uganda) Kirinya–Jinja	none	
3 September 2019	DF	(India)	Abhishek Das	(India) Gokulam Kerala	none	
4 September 2019	DF	(Nigeria)	Oguchi Uche	(Nigeria) Heartland	none	
5 September 2019	FW	(Brazil)	Marcel Sacramento	(Iraq) Erbil SC	none	
14 December 2019	FW	(Brazil)	Julio Cesar	(Thailand) North Bangkok University FC	none	
2 January 2020	FW	(Scotland)	David Goodwillie	(Scotland) Clyde	£50,000	

=== Transfers out ===
Date from	Position	Nationality	Name	To	Fee	Ref.
1 January 2020	MF	(Ghana)	Abednego Tetteh	NEROCA FC	Released	

== Current technical staff ==
As of 11 January 2019.

Position	Name
Head Coach	(Brazil) Douglas Silva
Technical Director	(India) L Nandakumar Singh
Assistant Coach	(India) KH Surmani
Goalkeeping Coach	(India) Joykumar

== Competitions ==
Competition	First match	Last match	Starting round	Final position	Record							
Competition	First match	Last match	Starting round	Final position	Pld	W	D	L	GF	GA	GD	Win %
Durand Cup	8 August 2019	18 August 2019	Group Stage	Group Stage	3	0	1	2	1	5	−4	0.00
I League	30 November 2019	TBD	—	—	9	4	2	3	7	10	−3	44.44
Super Cup	TBD	TBD		—	0	0	0	0	0	0	+0	—
Total					12	4	3	5	8	15	−7	33.33

Last updated: 15 December 2019.
Source: Competitions

== I-league ==
=== Result summary ===
Overall								Home						Away					
Pld	W	D	L	GF	GA	GD	Pts	W	D	L	GF	GA	GD	W	D	L	GF	GA	GD
7	2	2	3	7	10	−3	8	1	2		4	3	+1	1	0	3	3	7	−4

=== Results by round ===
Round	1	2	3	4	5	6	7	8	9	10	11	12	13	14	15	16	17	18	19	20
Ground	A	A	A	H	H	H	A	A	H	H	H	A	A	H	A	A	H	H	H	A
Result	L	L	L	D	D	W	W	W												
Position	11	11	11	10	11	9	9	3												

Updated to match(es) played on 10 December 2019. Source:
A = Away; H = Home; W = Win; D = Draw; L = Loss

=== Matches ===
Win Draw Loss Fixtures

1 December 2019 1	Chennai City FC	1–0	TRAU	Coimbatore
14:00 IST				Stadium: Jawaharlal Nehru Stadium; Attendance: 8,882; Referee: O. Thakur

11 December 2019 2	Mohun Bagan	4–0	TRAU	Kolkata
17:00 IST	González 5', 46'; Suhair 38'; Naorem (yellow card) 57'; Gurjinder (yellow card) 74'; Subha 90+1'		Abednego Tetteh (yellow card) 32'; Meitei (yellow card) 70'	Stadium: Kalyani Stadium

14 December 2019 3	East Bengal	2-1	TRAU	Kolkata
17:00 IST	Marcos de la Espada 17' Marti Crespi Pascual 89'		Deepak 45'	Stadium: Kalyani Stadium; Attendance: 9,882; Referee: Raktim Saha

22 December 2019 4	TRAU	2-2	Real Kashmir	Imphal
14:00 IST	78', 82'Princewell Emeka		27', 84'Mason Robertson	Stadium: Khuman Lampak Main Stadium; Attendance: 11,232

4 January 2020 5	TRAU	0-0	Punjab	Imphal
14:00 IST				Stadium: Khuman Lampak Main Stadium; Attendance: 10,564; Referee: Dipu roy

8 January 2020 6	TRAU	2-1	NEROCA	Imphal
14:00 IST				Stadium: Khuman Lampak Main Stadium; Attendance: 23,682

12 January 2020 7	Indian Arrows	0-2	TRAU	Goa
17:00 IST				Stadium: Tilak Maidan Stadium

19 January 2020 8	Churchill Brothers	1-2	TRAU	Goa
19:00 IST				Stadium: Fatorda Stadium; Attendance: 1260

25 January 2020 9	TRAU	2-1	Aizawl	Imphal
19:00 IST				Stadium: Khuman Lampak Main Stadium

2 February 2020 10	Gokulam Kerala	v	TRAU	Calicut
19:00 IST				Stadium: EMS Stadium

8 February 2020 11	NEROCA	v	TRAU	Imphal
19:00 IST				Stadium: Khuman Lampak Main Stadium

=== Group D ===
Pos	Team	Pld	W	D	L	GF	GA	GD	Pts	Qualification
1	Gokulam Kerala	3	3	0	0	11	1	+10	9	Knockout stage
2	Indian Air Force	3	1	1	1	1	3	−2	4	
3	TRAU	3	0	1	2	1	5	−4	1	
4	Chennaiyin	3	0	2	1	0	4	−4	2	

Updated to match(es) played on 18 August 2019. Source:
Rules for classification: Group stage tiebreakers

9 August 2019	TRAU	0–1	Indian Air Force	Howrah Stadium, Howrah
15:00		Report	Mohammed Aqib 65'

17 August 2019	Chennaiyin	abandoned	TRAU	Howrah Stadium, Howrah
15:00		Report

18 August 2019	TRAU	1-4	Gokulam Kerala	Howrah Stadium, Howrah
15:00	Rger 89'		Joseph 57', 64', 79'; Andre Etianne 71'

== Goalscorers ==
Rank	Pos.	Player	I League	Durand Cup	Super Cup	Total
1	MF	(India) Nganbam Naocha Singh	1			1
1	DF	(India) Deepak Devrani	1			1
1	MF	(India) Meitalkeishangbam Roger		1		1
