= Harmanjot Singh =

Harmanjot Singh may refer to:

- Harmanjot Singh (cricketer), Indian-born German cricketer
- Harmanjot Singh (footballer), Indian footballer
- Harmanjot Singh Khabra, Indian professional football player
