= 2024–25 I-League 2 =

17th season of the I-League 2

I-League 2
- Season: 2024–25
- Dates: 25 January – 26 April 2025
- Champions: Diamond Harbour
- Promoted: Diamond Harbour; Chanmari
- Relegated: KLASA; TRAU
- Matches: 72
- Goals: 179 (2.49 per match)
- Top goalscorer: Akshunna Tyagi (8 goals)
- Biggest home win: Bengaluru United 7–0 KLASA (10 April 2025)
- Biggest away win: KLASA 0–8 Chanmari (25 April 2025)
- Highest scoring: Chanmari 7–1 TRAU (11 February 2025); KLASA 0–8 Chanmari (25 April 2025)
- Longest winning run: 4 matches Chanmari; Diamond Harbour
- Longest unbeaten run: 16 matches Diamond Harbour
- Longest winless run: 10 matches KLASA
- Longest losing run: 8 matches KLASA
- Highest attendance: 12,000; KLASA 0–0 TRAU (2 February 2025)
- Lowest attendance: 20; Bengaluru United 1–2 Diamond Harbour (2 March 2025)
- Total attendance: 52,975
- Average attendance: 735

The 2024–25 I-League 2 was the 17th season of the I-League 2 since its establishment in 2008. It was also the 3rd season as the third tier of the Indian football league system. The top two clubs secured a place in the 2025–26 I-League season.

== Club changes ==
The following clubs have changed division since the 2023–24 season:

=== To I-League 2 ===
Relegated from I-League

- NEROCA
- TRAU

Promoted from I-League 3

- Diamond Harbour
- Chanmari
- SAT
- KLASA

=== From I-League 2 ===
Promoted to I-League

- Sporting Bengaluru
- Dempo

Relegated to I-League 3

- Maharashtra Oranje
- Kenkre

In October 2024, Sudeva Delhi withdrew from the tournament. This brought the total number of teams participating in the league to nine.

== Clubs ==
- Relegated from the 2023–24 I-League
- Clubs not promoted to the 2024–25 I-League in the previous season are reinstated
- Promoted from the 2024–25 I-League 3
Locations of I-League 2 clubs

Club	State	City	Stadium	Capacity
Bengaluru United	Karnataka	Bengaluru	Padukone – Dravid CSE	250
Chanmari	Mizoram	Aizawl	Rajiv Gandhi Stadium	20,000
Diamond Harbour	West Bengal	Diamond Harbour	Naihati Stadium	25,000
KLASA	Manipur	Keinou	Khuman Lampak Stadium	35,285
NEROCA	Manipur	Imphal	Khuman Lampak Stadium	35,285
SAT	Kerala	Tirur	Payyanad Stadium	30,000
Sporting Goa	Goa	Panaji	Bambolim Stadium	3,000
Sporting Goa	Goa	Panaji	Ella Academy Ground	500
TRAU	Manipur	Imphal	Khuman Lampak Stadium	35,285
United	West Bengal	Kalyani	Kalyani Stadium	20,000

== Personnel and sponsorship ==
Club	Head coach	Captain	Kit manufacturer	Shirt sponsor
Bengaluru United	(India) Nallappan Mohanraj	(India) Faiz Khan	Hyve	Nimidia
Chanmari	(India) Dipankur Sharma	(India) Lalrinchhana Tochhawng	Six5Six	Livaah
Diamond Harbour	(Spain) Kibu Vicuña	(India) Subrata Santra	Nautica	Apeejay Surrendra
KLASA	(India) Abu Osama Shaikh	(India) Ningthoujam Momocha Singh	Enadeka	
NEROCA	(India) Gyan Moyon	(India) Sushil Meitei	Vamos	
SAT	(India) Cleofas Alex	(India) Unise	Fly High	Fossil Petroleum
Sporting Goa	(India) Armando Colaco	(India) Joel Colaco	Six5Six	Models
TRAU	(India) L. Nandakumar Singh		Six5Six	TLT Sports Academy
United	(Belgium) Steve Herbots	(India) Tarak Hembram	Trak-Only	Aahar Caterer

== League table ==
Pos	Team	Pld	W	D	L	GF	GA	GD	Pts	Promotion or relegation
1	Diamond Harbour (C)	16	11	5	0	28	10	+18	38	Promotion to I-League
2	Chanmari	16	10	3	3	36	10	+26	33	Promotion to I-League
3	Sporting Goa	16	7	5	4	18	12	+6	26	
4	Bengaluru United	16	6	5	5	21	11	+10	23	
5	SAT	16	6	4	6	21	23	−2	22	
6	United	16	5	6	5	15	17	−2	21	
7	NEROCA	16	5	2	9	19	29	−10	17	
8	TRAU	16	3	3	10	14	30	−16	12	Relegation to I-League 3
9	KLASA	16	2	1	13	8	38	−30	7	Relegation to I-League 3

Source: I-League 2 AIFF
Rules for classification: 1) points; 2) head-to-head points; 3) head-to-head goal difference; 4) head-to-head goals scored; 5) goal difference; 6) number of goals scored; 7) fair play ranking; 8) drawing of lots
(C) Champions

== Fixtures and results ==
Home \ Away	BEN	CHN	DHB	KLA	NER	SAT	SCG	TRU	USC
Bengaluru United	—	0–2	1–2	7–0	1–2	0–0	1–1	3–0	0–0
Chanmari	1–0	—	0–1	4–0	1–0	3–0	1–1	7–1	4–1
Diamond Harbour	0–0	2–0	—	1–0	1–1	4–1	2–1	3–1	0–0
KLASA	0–2	0–8	1–3	—	1–2	0–1	0–1	0–0	0–1
NEROCA	0–2	1–2	0–2	2–3	—	0–1	2–1	1–1	1–0
SAT	1–0	1–1	1–2	2–0	5–2	—	1–1	2–3	0–0
Sporting Goa	0–0	1–0	1–1	1–0	3–0	2–3	—	1–0	2–0
TRAU	1–2	0–1	0–2	1–3	1–2	2–1	0–1	—	2–0
United	1–2	1–1	2–2	2–0	2–1	3–1	1–0	1–1	—

Updated to match(es) played on 25 April 2025. Source: I-League
Legend: Blue = home team win; Yellow = draw; Red = away team win.

=== Results by games ===
Team ╲ Round	1	2	3	4	5	6	7	8	9	10	11	12	13	14	15	16
Bengaluru United	L	L	W	W	L	W	L	D	W	D	W	D	L	W	D	D
Chanmari	W	W	D	W	W	W	W	L	L	W	D	W	W	D	L	W
Diamond Harbour	W	W	W	D	D	W	W	W	W	D	W	W	D	W	W	D
KLASA	L	D	L	L	L	L	L	L	L	L	W	L	L	W	L	L
NEROCA	L	W	L	D	W	L	D	W	L	L	L	L	L	W	L	W
SAT	W	D	W	W	L	L	D	L	L	W	D	W	D	L	L	W
Sporting Goa	L	D	W	L	W	W	D	D	W	W	D	W	W	L	D	L
TRAU	L	D	L	L	L	W	D	W	L	L	L	L	L	D	W	L
United	W	L	D	L	W	D	L	L	W	D	D	W	L	D	D	W

Updated to match(es) played on 25 April 2025. Source: I-League
W = Win; D = Draw; L = Lose

== Statistics ==
As of 26 April 2025

=== Top scorers ===
Rank	Player	Club	Goals
1	(India) Akshunna Tyagi	Bengaluru United	8
2	(India) Chabungbam Linky Meitei	NEROCA	7
2	(India) Aquib Nawab	SAT	7
4	(India) Senthamil S	SAT	6
4	(India) Tarak Hembram	United	6
4	(India) Sahil Harijan	United	6
7	(India) Girik Khosla	Diamond Harbour	5
7	(India) Naro Hari Shrestha	Diamond Harbour	5
7	(India) Doyal Alves	Sporting Goa	5
7	(India) Paul Ramfangzauva	Chanmari	5

=== Hat-tricks ===
Player	For	Against	Result	Date	Ref
(India) Akshunna Tyagi	Bengaluru United	TRAU	3–0 (H)	7 February 2025	
(India) KC Malsawmsanga	Chanmari	TRAU	7–1 (H)	11 February 2025	
(India) Akshunna Tyagi	Bengaluru United	KLASA	7–0 (H)	10 April 2025	

=== Clean sheets ===
Rank	Player	Club	Clean sheets
1	(India) Abhimanyu Singh	Sporting Goa	8
1	(India) Manjunath Hirekurbar	Bengaluru United	8
3	(India) Susnata Malik	Diamond Harbour	7
4	(India) Mohanraj K	SAT	6
4	(India) Zothanmawia	Chanmari	6
6	(India) Sourav Samanta	United	4
7	(India) Mohammad Abujar	TRAU	2
7	(India) Raunak Ghosh	United	2
9	(India) Salam Sanaton Singh	KLASA	1
9	(India) Khoirom Jackson Singh	NEROCA	1
9	(India) RS Lallawmzuala	Chanmari	1

=== Discipline ===
- Most yellow cards: 6
  - (India) Suprodip Hazra (Diamond Harbour)
- Most red cards: 1
  - 7 Players

=== Club discipline ===
- Most yellow cards: 33
  - Chanmari
- Most red cards: 3
  - Chanmari

== Overall attendances ==
Pos	Team	Total	High	Low	Average	Change
1	KLASA	22,775	12,000	100	2,846	n/a^{††}
2	TRAU	9,001	2,163	400	1,125	+341.2%^{†}
3	Chanmari	3,958	1,500	200	682	n/a^{††}
4	NEROCA	5,411	2,500	100	676	+86.7%^{†}
5	Diamond Harbour	2,949	1,230	109	368	n/a^{††}
6	Sporting Goa	2,342	512	80	292	+7.7%
7	United	2,200	400	150	275	+20.1%
8	Bengaluru United	1,784	456	20	223	+156.3%
9	SAT	1,055	359	50	131	n/a^{††}
	League total	52,975	12,000	20	735	+250.0%

Source: I-League
Notes:
^{†} NEROCA and TRAU played in the I-League in the 2023–24 season.
^{††} Attendance count for SA Tirur, Diamond Harbour, Chanmari and KLASA starts from this season.

=== Attendances by home matches ===
Club \ Match played	1	2	3	4	5	6	7	8	Total
KLASA	12,000	7,000	2,500	500	300	100	200	175	22,775
TRAU	2,163	500	1,236	1,126	1,120	500	400	1,956	9,001
Chanmari	703	1,048	500	200	732	375	400	1,500	5,458
NEROCA	2,500	580	729	800	100	200	400	102	5,411
Diamond Harbour	109	250	160	200	500	250	250	1,230	2,949
Sporting Goa	500	300	274	512	376	100	80	200	2,342
United	150	300	400	400	250	350	200	150	2,200
Bengaluru United	148	85	150	20	200	275	456	450	1,784
SAT	359	80	200	106	80	50	80	100	1,055

Legend: Highest Lowest
Updated to game(s) played on 26 April 2025
Source: I-League.org

== See also ==
- Men
  - 2024–25 Indian Super League (Tier I)
  - 2024–25 I-League (Tier II)
  - 2024–25 I-League 3 (Tier IV)
  - 2024–25 Indian State Leagues (Tier V)
  - 2025 Super Cup (April)
  - 2024 Durand Cup
  - 2025 Reliance Foundation Development League
- Women
  - 2024–25 Indian Women's League
  - 2024–25 Indian Women's League 2
