= Dimitrios Dimitriou =

Dimitrios Dimitriou may refer to:

- Dimitrios Dimitriou (swimmer), Greek athlete
- Dimitris Dimitriou (football manager), Cypriot football manager
- Dimitrios Dimitriou (sailor), Cypriot sailor

== See also ==
- Mitsos Dimitriou, Greek footballer
- Dimitrija Demeter, Croatian poet
