= Joseph Olaleye =

Nigerian footballer

Personal information
- Full name: Joseph Mayoma Olaleye
- Date of birth: 22 November 1996 (age 29)
- Place of birth: Nigeria
- Positions: Winger; striker

Team information
- Current team: TRAU
- Number: 9

Senior career*
Years	Team	Apps	(Gls)
2019–	TRAU	48	(9)
- * Club domestic league appearances and goals as of 19:35, 4 May 2022 (UTC)

Joseph Mayoma Olaleye (born 22 November 1996) is a Nigerian professional footballer who plays as a forward for I-League club TRAU.

== Club career ==
Born in Nigeria, Olaleye made his senior debut with I-league club TRAU, in the 2019–20 season and has secured 11 appearances for the Indian side primarily playing as right midfielder and centre-forward. Joseph also assisted Joel Sunday to score a goal against Mohun Bagan but they faced a decimating defeat of 1-3 due to well anticipated goals of Spaniards Fran González and Joseba Beitia. Also, Senegalese Baba Diawara contributed a goal to the Kolkata based side.

Initially signed by the Indian side TRAU, he had appearance for the senior squad and played for I-League 2nd Division side (erstwhile) in the 2018–19 season whereby the Nigerian has played up to the standards and made the club enable to acquire the promotion in the I-League whereby he secured 7 goals in 13 games. The Nigerian possess a decent chemistry with Princewill Emeka, who emerged as the leading goalscorer in the 2018–19 campaign.

== Career statistics ==
=== Club ===
As of 4 May 2022

Club	Season	League			Cup		Continental		Total	
Club	Season	Division	Apps	Goals	Apps	Goals	Apps	Goals	Apps	Goals
TRAU	2018–19	I-League 2nd Division	13	7	0	0	—		13	7
TRAU	2019–20	I-League	11	0	0	0	—		11	0
TRAU	2020–21	I-League	15	2	0	0	—		15	0
TRAU	2021–22	I-League	9	0	0	0	—		9	0
Career total			48	9	0	0	0	0	48	9
