= Imanuel Lalthazuala =

Indian footballer

Personal information
- Full name: Imanuel HS Lalthazuala
- Date of birth: 26 September 1994 (age 32)
- Place of birth: Mizoram, India
- Position: Centre-back

Team information
- Current team: Aizawl
- Number: 18

Senior career*
| Years | Team | Apps | (Gls) |
| 2011–2018 | Aizawl | 3 | (0) |
| 2018–2019 | Chanmari | | |
| 2019 | Chhinga Veng | 15 | (4) |
| 2019–2020 | Minerva Punjab | 1 | (0) |
| 2022– | Aizawl | 0 | (0) |
- * Club domestic league appearances and goals as of 20:40, 20 December 2019 (UTC)

Imanuel HS Lalthazuala (born 26 September 1994) is an Indian professional footballer who plays as a defender for Aizawl in the I-League.

== Career ==
Born in Mizoram, Lalthazuala has been with Aizawl since 2011, helping them to promotion to the I-League in 2015. He scored the winning goal for Mizoram in the 2015 National Games. His strike was the only one separating Mizoram and Punjab in the final.

Lalthazuala made his professional debut for Aizawl in the I-League on 9 January 2016 against the reigning champions, Mohun Bagan. He only played 37 minutes before coming off as Aizawl lost 3–1.

== Career statistics ==
=== Club ===
As of 20 December 2019

| Club | Season | League | | | Cup | | AFC | | Total | |
| Club | Season | Division | Apps | Goals | Apps | Goals | Apps | Goals | Apps | Goals |
|---|---|---|---|---|---|---|---|---|---|---|
| Aizawl | 2015–16 | I-League | 3 | 0 | 0 | 0 | — | | 3 | 0 |
| Chhinga Veng | 2018–19 | I-League 2nd Division | 15 | 4 | 0 | 0 | — | | 15 | 4 |
| Minerva Punjab | 2019–20 | I-League | 1 | 0 | 0 | 0 | — | | 1 | 0 |
| Aizawl | 2022–23 | I-League | 0 | 0 | 0 | 0 | — | | 0 | 0 |
| Career total | | | 19 | 4 | 0 | 0 | 0 | 0 | 19 | 4 |
