= Premjit Singh Laishram =

Indian footballer

Premjit Singh
Personal information
- Full name: Premjit Singh Laishram
- Date of birth: 1 February 2002 (age 24)
- Place of birth: Manipur, India
- Position: Winger

Team information
- Current team: TRAU

Youth career
- Chajing Inat Kanba Lup
- NorthEast United

Senior career*
| Years | Team | Apps | (Gls) |
| 2018–2020 | TRAU | 16 | (1) |
| 2020–2022 | Odisha | 6 | (0) |
| 2022– | TRAU | 0 | (0) |
- * Club domestic league appearances and goals as of 22:43, 24 February 2021 (UTC)

Premjit Singh Laishram (Meitei: Laishram Premjit Singh, born 1 February 2002) is an Indian professional footballer who plays as a winger for I-League club TRAU.

== Club career ==
Born in Manipur, Singh began his career in the I-League with TRAU. He made his professional debut for the club on 22 December 2019 against Real Kashmir. Singh started and played the whole match as TRAU drew 2–2. He then scored his first professional goal for the club on 25 January 2020 against Aizawl. His 27th-minute goal was the equalizer in a 2–1 victory.

On 11 June 2020, it was announced that Singh signed with Indian Super League club Odisha.

== Career statistics ==
=== Club ===
As of 24 February 2021

| Club | Season | League | | | Cup | | AFC | | Total | |
| Club | Season | Division | Apps | Goals | Apps | Goals | Apps | Goals | Apps | Goals |
|---|---|---|---|---|---|---|---|---|---|---|
| TRAU | 2018–19 | I-League 2nd Division | 7 | 0 | 0 | 0 | — | | 7 | 0 |
| TRAU | 2019–20 | I-League | 9 | 1 | 1 (Note: Appearance(s) in Durand Cup) | 0 | — | | 10 | 1 |
| TRAU | TRAU total | | 16 | 1 | 1 | 0 | 0 | 0 | 17 | 1 |
| Odisha | 2020–21 | Indian Super League | 6 | 0 | 0 | 0 | — | | 6 | 0 |
| Odisha | 2021–22 | Indian Super League | 0 | 0 | 0 | 0 | — | | 0 | 0 |
| Odisha | Odisha total | | 6 | 0 | 0 | 0 | 0 | 0 | 6 | 0 |
| TRAU | 2022–23 | I-League | 0 | 0 | 0 | 0 | — | | 0 | 0 |
| Career total | | | 22 | 1 | 1 | 0 | 0 | 0 | 23 | 1 |
