= Princewill Emeka =

Nigerian footballer

Personal information
- Full name: Princewill Emeka Olariche
- Date of birth: 24 May 1992 (age 34)
- Place of birth: Owerri, Nigeria
- Height: 1.84 m (6 ft 0 in)
- Position: Striker

Youth career
- 2008–2012: Ngor Okpala United
- 2012–13: Heartland B

Senior career*
Years	Team	Apps	(Gls)
2014–2016	Vin Sports FC		
2016	NEROCA	7	(1)
2018	TRAU	11	(7)
2018	Mohammedan	10	(4)
2018–2020	TRAU	31	(13)
2020–2021	Aizawl	3	(0)
2021–	Kickstart		
- * Club domestic league appearances and goals as of 22:22, 30 January 2021 (UTC)

Princewill Emeka Olariche (born 24 May 1992) is a Nigerian professional footballer who plays as a forward. He last played for Kickstart.

== Club career ==
=== Nigeria ===
In 2013, Nigerian top-tier club Heartland FC scouted Princewill and offered him to play for reserve team. After spending a season with Heartland he then moved to Abuja-based team, Vin Sports FC in Nigeria. After another season he decided to move to Asia to secure a better deal in his football career.

=== NEROCA FC ===
In January 2016, Princewill came to India to secure a better deal and tried his luck in Manipur based club NEROCA FC. On 2 February 2016, NEROCA FC and Princewill signed an agreement for 1 season. He played final round of 2015–16 I-League 2nd Division and Manipur Super League with NEROCA.

=== TRAU FC ===
For season 2017-18 he moved to rivals of NEROCA FC in Manipur state league, TRAU FC. He has represented TRAU in 2017–18 I-League 2nd Division with impressive performance scoring 7 goals under his belt.

=== Mohammedan Sporting ===
In 2019, while playing in the 2nd Division I-League he was scouted to Kolkata based club Mohammedan Sporting. Mohammedan Sporting gave him offer for Calcutta Football League and he further appeared in all matches for Mohammedan in Kolkata league.

=== TRAU FC ===
After Kolkata league, Princewill went back to his former club TRAU FC and signed with them for I-League 2nd Division. In 2018–19 season in 2nd division I-League, Princewill formed a formidable partnership with Nigerian teammate Joseph Olaleye and TRAU managed to secure top spot with a promotion to I-League. Princewill was the top scorer in 2018–19 season with 10 goals on his name.

In 2019–20 season with TRAU FC, Princewill got captain's armband for the entire season of I-League.

== Career statistics ==
=== Club ===
As of 30 January 2021

Club	Season	League			Cup		Continental		Total	
Club	Season	Division	Apps	Goals	Apps	Goals	Apps	Goals	Apps	Goals
NEROCA	2015–16	I-League 2nd Division	7	1	0	0	—		7	1
TRAU	2017–18	I-League 2nd Division	11	7	0	0	—		11	7
TRAU	2018–19	I-League 2nd Division	16	10	0	0	—		16	10
TRAU	2019–20	I-League	15	3	3 (Note: Appearance(s) in Durand Cup)	0	—		18	3
TRAU	TRAU total		42	20	3	0	0	0	45	20
Aizawl	2020–21	I-League	3	0	0	0	—		3	0
Career total			52	21	3	0	0	0	55	21

== Honours ==
TRAU

- I-League 2nd Division: 2018–19
