= 2018–19 I-League 2nd Division =

12th season of the I-League 2nd Division

I-League 2nd Division
- Season: 2018–19
- Champions: TRAU
- Promoted: TRAU
- Matches: 81
- Goals: 253 (3.12 per match)
- Top goalscorer: Philip Adjah; Princewill Emeka (10 goals)
- Biggest home win: Bengaluru (R) 8–0 Hindustan (25 January 2019)
- Biggest away win: Kerala Blasters (R) 0–5 Ozone (16 March 2019)
- Highest scoring: Bengaluru (R) 8–0 Hindustan (25 January 2019); Rainbow 6–2 Jamshedpur (R) (28 January 2019)

The 2018–19 I-League 2nd Division (known as Hero 2018–19 I-League 2nd Division for sponsorship reasons), was the 12th season of the I-League 2nd Division, the second division Indian football league, since its establishment in 2008. The league was played from January to April 2019.

TRAU won the title and earned the promotion to 2019–20 I-League.

== Teams ==
=== Nominated teams ===
At the start of the season 23 teams were nominated by the state associations for participation in this edition of the league. Following clubs were nominated:

Kerala: SAT Tirur, Quartz, Kerala

Delhi: Hindustan, Sudeva Moonlight, Delhi United

Manipur: TRAU, SSU-Singjamei

Meghalaya: Langsning

Mizoram: Chhinga Veng

Sikkim: United Sikkim

West Bengal: Mohammedan Sporting, Rainbow

Jammu and Kashmir: Lonestar Kashmir, J&K Bank

Karnataka: Ozone, South United

Telangana: Fateh Hyderabad

Odisha: Radha Raman Club

Bihar: Shirsh Bihar United

Gujarat: ARA

Jharkhand: Shivansh Jharkhand FC

Madhya Pradesh: Madan Maharaj

=== Selected teams ===
On 7 December 2018, it was announced by the league committee that nine clubs cleared the licensing criteria and are allowed to participate in this season. Additionally TRAU F.C. were granted three days of extension to clear the club licensing, considering the situation in their state league. TRAU cleared the licensing, taking the total teams competing to sixteen.

Locations of the 2018–19 I-League 2nd Division teams

=== Stadiums and locations ===
Team	City/State	Stadium	Capacity
ARA	Ahmedabad, Gujarat	The Arena	22,000
ATK (R)	Kolkata, West Bengal	Sailen Manna Stadium	15,000
Bengaluru (R)	Bengaluru, Karnataka	Bangalore Football Stadium	8,400
Chennaiyin (R)	Chennai, Tamil Nadu	SSN College Ground	400
Chhinga Veng	Aizawl, Mizoram	Rajiv Gandhi Stadium	20,000
Fateh Hyderabad	Hyderabad, Telangana	FSV Arena	100
Goa (R)	Margao, Goa	GMC Athletic Stadium	3,200
Hindustan	Delhi	Ambedkar Stadium	35,000
Jamshedpur (R)	Jamshedpur, Jharkhand	JRD Tata Sports Complex	24,500
Kerala Blasters (R)	Kochi, Kerala	Panampally Ground	300
Lonestar Kashmir	Katra, Jammu and Kashmir	SMVDSB Sports Complex	2,600
Mohammedan	Kolkata, West Bengal	Kalyani Stadium	20,000
Ozone	Bengaluru, Karnataka	Bangalore Football Stadium	8,400
Rainbow	New Barrackpore, West Bengal	Barasat Stadium	22,000
South United	Bengaluru, Karnataka	Bangalore Football Stadium	8,400
TRAU	Imphal, Manipur	Khuman Lampak Main Stadium	35,000

=== Personnel and kits ===
Team	Manager	Kit manufacturer	Shirt sponsor
ARA	(India) Vivek Nagul	Seven	Amul
ATK (R)	(India) Deggie Cardozo	Nivia	CESC Limited
Bengaluru (R)	(India) Naushad Moosa	Puma	Kia Motors
Chennaiyin (R)	(India) Sameer Shaikh	Performax	Apollo Tyres
Chhinga Veng	(India) Danny Lalduhawma	None	JSJ FitPro
Fateh Hyderabad	(India) Vimal Arora	Vector X	Premier
Goa (R)	(India) Clifford Miranda	Sqad Gear	Xiaomi
Hindustan	(India) Sena	Cosco	Hero Motocorp
Jamshedpur (R)	(India) Kundan Chandra	Nivia	Tata Steel
Kerala Blasters (R)	(India) Renjith Ajithkumar	Six5Six	Muthoot
Lonestar Kashmir	(India) Ishfaq Ahmed	Kaizen	Rising Kashmir
Mohammedan	(India) Raghunath Nandi	Kaizen	Orion
Ozone	(England) David Booth	Lotto	Ozone Group
Rainbow	(India) Jahar Das	Vamos	New Barrackpore Co-operative Homes Ltd
South United	(India) Noel Wilson	Pyramid Sports	Hot Fut
TRAU	(India) Nandakumar Singh	VectorX	HVS Constructions

=== Managerial changes ===
Team	Outgoing manager	Manner of departure	Incoming manager	Date of appointment
Mohammedan	(India) Biswajit Bhattacharya	2018	(India) Raghunath Nandi	2018
South United	(Spain) Miki Lladó	2019	(India) Noel Wilson	2019

=== Foreign players ===
Each club, excluding the Indian Super League reserve sides, can register three foreign players in their squad. One of the foreign players has to be from an AFC Member Nation.

Club	Player 1	Player 2	Asian Visa
ARA			
Chhinga Veng	(Ghana) Godwin Quashiga		
Fateh Hyderabad	(Ghana) Edmund Owusu Peprah	(Ghana) Forster Addae	(Australia) Emile Demey
Hindustan	(Liberia) Trokon Saykiamien	(Ukraine) Ronaque Bakshi	(Afghanistan) Maruf Fazly
Lonestar Kashmir	(Nigeria) Wahab Lasisi	(Nigeria) Jagaba Hamza	(Bhutan) Lhendup Dorji
Mohammedan	(Ghana) Phillip Adjah Tetteh	(Ivory Coast) Arthur Kouassi	
Ozone	(Nigeria) Chika Wali	(Ghana) William Opoku	
Rainbow	(Nigeria) Joel Sunday	(Nigeria) Emmanuel Chigozie	
South United			
TRAU	(Nigeria) Princewill Emeka	(Nigeria) Joseph Olaleye	

== Preliminary round ==
Tiebreakers
The teams are ranked according to points (3 points for a win, 1 point for a draw, 0 points for a loss). If two or more teams are equal on points on completion of the group matches, the following criteria are applied in the order given to determine the rankings:
1. Greater number of points obtained in the matches between the Teams concerned
2. Goal difference resulting from the matches between the Teams concerned
3. Greater number of goals scored in the matches between the Teams concerned
4. Goal difference in all the matches
5. Greater number of goals scored in all the matches
6. Drawing of lots

=== Group A ===
Pos	Team	Pld	W	D	L	GF	GA	GD	Pts	Qualification
1	Bengaluru (R) (Note: Reserves team are ineligible for advance to the next round)	8	7	1	0	26	3	+23	22	
2	Goa (R)	8	5	0	3	17	7	+10	15	
3	Lonestar Kashmir	8	3	2	3	8	13	−5	11	Advance to Final Round
4	ARA	8	3	1	4	10	14	−4	10	
5	Hindustan	8	0	0	8	5	29	−24	0	

Source: Soccerway

==== Fixtures and results ====
16 January 2019	ARA	4–3	Hindustan	Ahmedabad
15:00 IST	Syed Shoaib Ahmed 28', 49', 87'; Amey Bhatkal 55'		12', 73' Franko Paul; 61' Maruf Fazly	Stadium: The Arena; Attendance: 400; Referee: Rosario Fernandes

16 January 2019	Goa (R)	1–4	Bengaluru (R)	Nagoa
15:45 IST	Aaren D'Silva 66'		51' Roshan Singh; 69', 74' Altamash Sayed; 84' Leon Augustine	Stadium: Nagoa Ground; Attendance: 150; Referee: Harish Kundu

21 January 2019	ARA	0–4	Bengaluru (R)	Ahmedabad
15:30 IST			37' Advait Shinde; 44' Roshan Singh; 67', 80' B Lalnuntluanga	Stadium: The Arena; Attendance: 150; Referee: Prasad Shivanand Surlakar

21 January 2019	Goa (R)	6–0	Hindustan	Old Goa
15:45 IST	Liston Colaco 73', 74', 85'; Meldon Dsilva 76'; Nestor Dias 87'; Aaren D'silva 90+1'			Stadium: Ella Ground; Attendance: 800; Referee: Ajay Krishnan

25 January 2019	Bengaluru (R)	8–0	Hindustan	Bengaluru
15:30 IST	Advait Shinde 11'; Shrivas 16', 43'; Myron Mendes 20'; Leon Augustine 51', 57'; Emanuel Lalchhanchhuaha 60'; Altamash Sayed 61'			Stadium: Bangalore Football Stadium; Attendance: 250; Referee: Ashwin

25 January 2019	ARA	2–3	Lonestar Kashmir	Ahmedabad
15:30 IST	Amey Bhatkal 58'; Aditya Ashok Kumar Jha 72'		Jagaba Hamza 25', 51'; Atinder Mani 66'	Stadium: The Arena; Attendance: 200; Referee: Harish Kundu

20 February 2019	Hindustan	0–2	ARA	Delhi
14:30 IST			24', 79' Parminder Singh	Stadium: Ambedkar Stadium; Attendance: 90; Referee: Dipu Roy

25 February 2019	Hindustan	1–3	Bengaluru (R)	Delhi
14:30 IST	Franko Paul 6' (pen.)		14' Altamash Sayed; 65' Roshan Singh; 87' Namgyal Bhutia	Stadium: Ambedkar Stadium; Attendance: 500; Referee: Ravindra Thapliyal

5 March 2019	ARA	1–0	Goa (R)	Ahmedabad
15:30 IST	Syed Shoaib Ahmed 84'			Stadium: The Arena; Attendance: 200; Referee: Vishal

13 March 2019	Hindustan	0–3	Goa (R)	Delhi
14:30 IST			76' Sweden Fernandes; 79' Aaren D Silva; 86' Hayden Fernandes	Stadium: Ambedkar Stadium; Attendance: 170; Referee: Diwakar Kumar

15 March 2019	Bengaluru (R)	0–0	Lonestar Kashmir	Bengaluru
15:30 IST				Stadium: Bangalore Football Stadium; Attendance: 450; Referee: Animesh Biswas

19 March 2019	Goa (R)	4–0	Lonestar Kashmir	Old Goa
15:45 IST	Aaren D Silva 39', 65'; Meldon D'Silva 54'; Lalawmpuia 70'			Stadium: Ella Ground; Attendance: 50; Referee: Khamruddin K M

20 March 2019	Bengaluru (R)	2–0	ARA	Bengaluru
15:30 IST	Roshan Singh 47'; Altamash Sayed 73'			Stadium: Bangalore Football Stadium; Attendance: 200; Referee: Jestin Jose Kuzhivelil

24 March 2019	Hindustan	0–1	Lonestar Kashmir	Delhi
14:30 IST			50' Atinder Mani	Stadium: Ambedkar Stadium; Attendance: 600; Referee: Ashish Tiwari

24 March 2019	Goa (R)	1–0	ARA	Old Goa
15:45 IST	Hayden Fernandes 53'			Stadium: Ella Ground; Attendance: 100; Referee: Ashwin

27 March 2019	Lonestar Kashmir	1–3	Bengaluru (R)	Katra
14:00 IST	Basit Ahmed Bhat 65'		Advait Shinde 7'; Edmund Lalrindika 20'; Myron Mendes 40' (pen.)	Stadium: SMVDSB Sports Complex; Attendance: 200; Referee: Harish Kundu

30 March 2019	Lonestar Kashmir	2–1	Hindustan	Katra
14:00 IST	Trokon Saykiamien 4' (o.g.); Basit Ahmed Bhat 9'		Raja Musharaf Dar 28'	Stadium: SMVDSB Sports Complex; Attendance: 200; Referee: Pratik Mondal

30 March 2019	Bengaluru (R)	2–0	Goa (R)	Bengaluru
15:30 IST	Edmund Lalrindika 4'; Roshan Singh 50'			Stadium: Bangalore Football Stadium; Attendance: 300; Referee: Akashkumar Kamaleshkumar Mehta

3 April 2019	Lonestar Kashmir	0–2	Goa (R)	Katra
14:00 IST			Hayden Fernandes 81'; Aaren D Silva 84'	Stadium: SMVDSB Sports Complex; Attendance: 82; Referee: Aditya Purkayastha

6 April 2019	Lonestar Kashmir	1–1	ARA	Katra
14:00 IST	Jagaba Hamza 26'		Parminder Singh 33'	Stadium: SMVDSB Sports Complex; Attendance: 70; Referee: Anil Gulia

=== Group B ===
Pos	Team	Pld	W	D	L	GF	GA	GD	Pts	Qualification
1	Ozone	8	6	2	0	19	6	+13	20	Advance to Final Round
2	Fateh Hyderabad	8	4	1	3	12	9	+3	13	
3	Kerala Blasters (R) (Note: Reserves team are ineligible for advance to the next round)	8	2	2	4	8	13	−5	8	
4	South United	8	1	4	3	10	16	−6	7	
5	Chennaiyin (R)	8	1	3	4	8	13	−5	6	

Source: Soccerway

==== Fixtures and results ====
14 January 2019	Ozone	1–0	South United	Bengaluru
15:00 IST	Manvir Singh 72'			Stadium: Bangalore Football Stadium; Attendance: 500; Referee: Sumiraj Poorathil Sudhakaran

14 January 2019	Kerala Blasters (R)	0–0	Chennaiyin (R)	Kochi
15:30 IST				Stadium: Panampally Ground; Attendance: 125; Referee: Ankush Chakraborty

19 January 2019	Chennaiyin (R)	3–3	South United	Chennai
13:30 IST	Krishna Pandit 11'; B Rohmingthanga 14', 16'		22' Sudipta Malakar; 70', 89' Cletus Paul	Stadium: SSN College Ground; Attendance: 100; Referee: Sumiraj Purathil Sudhakaran

19 January 2019	Kerala Blasters (R)	0–1	Fateh Hyderabad	Kochi
15:30 IST			68' Edmond Peprah	Stadium: Panampally Ground; Attendance: 50; Referee: Ashish Tiwari

22 January 2019	Chennaiyin (R)	1–2	Ozone	Chennai
13:30 IST	Joysana Singh 42'		71' Prabin Tigga (o.g.); 85' Manvir Singh	Stadium: SSN College Ground; Attendance: 60; Referee: Rafeek Babu Mannamparambath

25 January 2019	Fateh Hyderabad	4–0	South United	Bengaluru
15:00 IST	Naro Hari Shrestha 29'; Gagandeep Singh 50'; Bedashwor Singh 87'; Emile O Damey 89'			Stadium: FSV Arena; Attendance: 150; Referee: Dipu Roy

22 February 2019	South United	1–3	Kerala Blasters (R)	Bengaluru
15:00 IST	Amit Tudu 71'		Md Esha 17'; Nongdamba Naorem 44'; Pragyan Sundar Gogoi 90+2'	Stadium: Bangalore Football Stadium; Attendance: 350; Referee: Ashwin

22 February 2019	Fateh Hyderabad	2–1	Chennaiyin (R)	Bengaluru
15:00 IST	Naro Hari Shrestha 34'; Haileuyibe Iranggau 86'		Syed Suhail Pasha 72'	Stadium: FSV Arena; Attendance: 25; Referee: Moosa Vayoli

26 February 2019	South United	1–1	Chennaiyin (R)	Bengaluru
15:00 IST	David Lalbiakzara 15'		90+2' Krishna Pandit	Stadium: Bangalore Football Stadium; Attendance: 150; Referee: Rafeek Babu Mannamparambath

26 February 2019	Fateh Hyderabad	2–1	Kerala Blasters (R)	Bengaluru
15:00 IST	Hitova Ayemi 35'; Rahul Yadav 60'		90+4' Hrishi Dhath	Stadium: FSV Arena; Attendance: 50; Referee: Prasad Shivanand Surlakar

2 March 2019	Ozone	2–1	Kerala Blasters (R)	Bengaluru
15:30 IST	William Opoku 13'; C. S. Sabeeth 42'		78' Pragyan Sundar Gogoi	Stadium: Bangalore Football Stadium; Attendance: 150; Referee: Ashwin

3 March 2019	South United	1–0	Fateh Hyderabad	Bengaluru
15:30 IST	Chanambam Jotin Singh 71'			Stadium: Bangalore Football Stadium; Attendance: 200; Referee: Maria Joseph Arokia

7 March 2019	Fateh Hyderabad	0–0	Ozone	Bengaluru
15:30 IST				Stadium: FSV Arena; Attendance: 120; Referee: Sunil Suryakant Nanodkar

9 March 2019	Kerala Blasters (R)	2–2	South United	Kochi
15:30 IST	Surag Chhetri 16'; Hrishi Dhath 26'		14' Rungsing Muinao; 70' Aaron D'costa	Stadium: Panampally Ground; Attendance: Ravindra Thapliyal; Referee: 100

11 March 2019	Ozone	3–0	Chennaiyin (R)	Bengaluru
15:30 IST	C. S. Sabeeth 22'; Shaiborlang Kharpan 33', 45+2'			Stadium: Bangalore Football Stadium; Attendance: 600; Referee: Dipu Roy

16 March 2019	Kerala Blasters (R)	0–5	Ozone	Kochi
15:30 IST			Shaiborlang Kharpan 6'; Prabin Subba 19'; Chika Wali 25'; C. S. Sabeeth 58', 84'	Stadium: Panampally Ground; Attendance: 100; Referee: Aditya Purkayastha

21 March 2019	Chennaiyin (R)	0–1	Kerala Blasters (R)	Chennai
15:30 IST			39' Pragyan Sundar Gogoi	Stadium: SSN College Ground; Attendance: 75; Referee: Ankush Chakraborty

21 March 2019	Ozone	4–2	Fateh Hyderabad	Bengaluru
15:30 IST	C. S. Sabeeth 27'; Manvir Singh 37'; Prabin Subba 52'; Sampath Kuttymani 87'		46' Naro Hari Shrestha; 65' Edmond Peprah	Stadium: Bangalore Football Stadium; Attendance: 200; Referee: Fasil Salahudeen

26 March 2019	Chennaiyin (R)	2–1	Fateh Hyderabad	Chennai
15:30 IST	B Rohmingthanga 38'; Krishna Pandit 45+2'		90+4' Forster Addae	Stadium: SSN College Ground; Attendance: 50; Referee: Fasil Salahudeen

26 March 2019	South United	2–2	Ozone	Bengaluru
15:30 IST	Rungsing Muinao 32'; Sudipta Malakar 68'		55' Harpreet Rulbir; 82' (o.g.) Krishanu Malo	Stadium: Bangalore Football Stadium; Attendance: 200; Referee: Ashwin

=== Group C ===
Pos	Team	Pld	W	D	L	GF	GA	GD	Pts	Qualification
1	Chhinga Veng	10	6	2	2	18	11	+7	20	Advance to Final Round
2	TRAU	10	5	2	3	17	20	−3	17	Advance to Final Round
3	Mohammedan	10	5	1	4	21	13	+8	16	
4	ATK (R) (Note: Reserves team are ineligible for advance to the next round)	10	4	2	4	15	14	+1	14	
5	Rainbow	10	3	4	3	17	16	+1	13	
6	Jamshedpur (R)	10	1	1	8	10	24	−14	4	

Source: Soccerway

==== Fixtures and results ====
12 January 2019	Mohammedan	0–2	ATK (R)	Kolkata
13:30 IST			Thomyo L Shimray 26'; S K Azaruddin 59'	Stadium: Kalyani Stadium; Attendance: 500; Referee: Ibungo Meetei Ningthoukhongjam

13 January 2019	Jamshedpur (R)	0–1	TRAU	Jamshedpur
14:00 IST			Princewill Emeka 46'	Stadium: JRD Tata Sports Complex; Attendance: 100; Referee: Deepak Singha

14 January 2019	Rainbow	0–0	Chhinga Veng	Kolkata
14:00 IST				Stadium: Barasat Stadium; Attendance: 500; Referee: Jibon Chardra Gogoi

17 January 2019	Jamshedpur (R)	0–1	Chhinga Veng	Jamshedpur
14:00 IST			38' Lalromawia	Stadium: JRD Tata Sports Complex; Attendance: 310; Referee: Anil Gulia

17 January 2019	Rainbow	1–1	Mohammedan	Kolkata
14:00 IST	Sourov Roy 4'		88' Philip Adjah (pen.)	Stadium: Barasat Stadium; Attendance: 1500; Referee: Ibungo Meetei Ningthoukhongjam

17 January 2019	ATK (R)	2–3	TRAU	Kolkata
14:00 IST	SK Azaruddin 11'; Thomyo Shimray 60'		4', 73' Princewill Emeka; 36' Ngangbam Naocha Singh	Stadium: Howrah Stadium; Attendance: 300; Referee: Ripu Nath Gogoi

22 January 2019	TRAU	2–3	Rainbow	Imphal
14:00 IST	Reisangmi Khodang 12'; Princewill Emeka 73'		38' Sujit Sadhu; 50' Sunday; 65' Sujay Dutta	Stadium: Khuman Lampak Main Stadium; Attendance: 2,000; Referee: Jibon Chandra Gogoi

23 January 2019	ATK (R)	2–0	Jamshedpur (R)	Kolkata
14:00 IST	Thomyo L Shimray 32'; Yumnam Singh 42'			Stadium: Howrah Stadium; Attendance: 300; Referee: Aditya Purkayasta

25 January 2019	Chhinga Veng	3–0	Mohammedan	Aizawl
14:00 IST	MS Dawngliana 2'; Lalromawia 25'; Lalmuanzova 81'			Stadium: Rajiv Gandhi Stadium; Attendance: 800; Referee: Lanthoiba Pheiroijam

28 January 2019	Rainbow	6–2	Jamshedpur (R)	Kolkata
14:00 IST	Sujit Sadhu 35'; Suraj Mahato 45+1'; Sunday 57', 65'; Saikat Sarkar 63'; Robi 74'		82' Sohrab Akhtar; 89' Jaypal Singh Sirka	Stadium: Barasat Stadium; Attendance: 300; Referee: Harish Kundu

21 February 2019	ATK (R)	0–0	Rainbow	Kolkata
14:00 IST				Stadium: Howrah Stadium; Attendance: 400; Referee: Fasil Salahudeen

23 February 2019	TRAU	0–2	Chhinga Veng	Imphal
14:00 IST			Thasiama 6'; Lalliansanga 39'	Stadium: Khuman Lampak Main Stadium; Attendance: 907; Referee: Akash Jackson Routh

24 February 2019	Mohammedan	2–1	Jamshedpur (R)	Kolkata
14:30 IST	Arthur Kouassi Desmos 43', 70'		82' Samim Hossain	Stadium: Kalyani Stadium; Attendance: 300; Referee: Khamruddin K M

28 February 2019	TRAU	2–1	Mohammedan	Imphal
14:00 IST	Princewill Emeka 25'; Joseph Mayowa 56'		12' Philip Adjah	Stadium: Khuman Lampak Main Stadium; Attendance: 400; Referee: Srikant Bohidar

28 February 2019	Chhinga Veng	3–1	ATK (R)	Aizawl
14:00 IST	Vanlalbiaa Chhangte 26'; Godwin Quashiga 53'; Lalliansanga 65'		73' Ashish Jha	Stadium: Rajiv Gandhi Stadium; Attendance: 1000; Referee: Jibon Chandra Gogoi

3 March 2019	TRAU	2–0	Jamshedpur (R)	Imphal
14:00 IST	Kivi Zhimomi 45+1'; Joseph Mayowa Olaleye 85'			Stadium: Khuman Lampak Main Stadium; Attendance: 800; Referee: Prasad Rabha

4 March 2019	Chhinga Veng	3–1	Rainbow	Aizawl
9:00 IST	Imanuel Lalthazuala 24', 64', 88'		44' Sunday	Stadium: Rajiv Gandhi Stadium; Attendance: 500; Referee: Lanthioba Pheiroijam

4 March 2019	ATK (R)	0–4	Mohammedan	Kolkata
15:00 IST			43' Stephanson Pale; 45+1' Prosenjit Chakroborty; 53' Philip Adjah; 78' Arthur Kouassi	Stadium: Howrah Stadium; Attendance: 150; Referee: Akash Jackson Routh

9 March 2019	Jamshedpur (R)	0–4	ATK (R)	Jamshedpur
14:00 IST			Ashish Jha 26'; Thomyo L Shimray 35'; Monoranjan Singh 51'; Yumnam Singh 76'	Stadium: JRD Tata Sports Complex; Attendance: 150; Referee: Prabhat Kalita

9 March 2019	Mohammedan	3–0	Chhinga Veng	Kolkata
15:00 IST	Arthur Kouassi 38'; Philip Adjah 43', 70'			Stadium: Kalyani Stadium; Attendance: 200; Referee: Srikant Bohidar

10 March 2019	Rainbow	3–3	TRAU	Kolkata
14:00 IST	Abhijit Sarkar 15', 45'; Sunday 89'		Kivi Zhimomi 77'; Joseph Mayowa Olaleye 90+1'; Ningthoujam Momocha Singh 90+4'	Stadium: Barasat Stadium; Attendance: 200; Referee: Nishant Bhengra

12 March 2019	ATK (R)	1–2	Chhinga Veng	Kolkata
15:00 IST	Yumnam Singh 8'		Lalromawia 14'; Imanuel Lalthazuala 22'	Stadium: Howrah Stadium; Attendance: 75; Referee: Vishal

13 March 2019	Jamshedpur (R)	3–0	Rainbow	Jamshedpur
14:00 IST	Jaypal Singh Sirka 53'; Gorachand Mamdi 62'; Sohrab Akhtar 63'			Stadium: JRD Tata Sports Complex; Attendance: 700; Referee: Jehrul Islam

13 March 2019	Mohammedan	6–0	TRAU	Kolkata
15:00 IST	Stephanson Pale 43', 71'; Philip Adjah 66', 90+1'; Md. Amirul 86'			Stadium: Kalyani Stadium; Attendance: 350; Referee: Jatinder Singh

17 March 2019	TRAU	1–1	ATK (R)	Imphal
14:00 IST	Princewill Emeka 15'		Yumnam Singh 69'	Stadium: Khuman Lampak Main Stadium; Attendance: 1000; Referee: Akash Jackson Routh

17 March 2019	Mohammedan	0–2	Rainbow	Kolkata
15:00 IST			Sunday 4'; Sourov Roy 90+2'	Stadium: Kalyani Stadium; Attendance: 188; Referee: Priyobarta Singh Langpoklakpam

18 March 2019	Chhinga Veng	2–2	Jamshedpur (R)	Aizawl
14:00 IST	Lalmuanzova 26'; Lalrammawia Rammawia 30'		Subhankar Sana 72'; Jaypal Singh Sirka 88'	Stadium: Rajiv Gandhi Stadium; Attendance: 300; Referee: Shubhankar Khamri

22 March 2019	Jamshedpur (R)	2–4	Mohammedan	Jamshedpur
14:00 IST	Sohrab Akhtar 15'; Subhankar Sana 58' (pen.)		Arthur Kouassi 13'; Philip Adjah 17', 28' (pen.), 52'	Stadium: JRD Tata Sports Complex; Attendance: 250; Referee: Harish Kundu

22 March 2019	Rainbow	1–2	ATK (R)	Kolkata
14:00 IST	Sunday 51'		Yumnam Singh 45+2'; Thomyo L Shimray 88'	Stadium: Barasat Stadium; Attendance: 338; Referee: Prabhat Kalita

22 March 2019	Chhinga Veng	2–3	TRAU	Aizawl
14:00 IST	Vanlalbiaa Chhangte 64'; Lalliansanga 73'		Shougrapkam Netrajit Singh 8'; Moirangthem Deepak Singh 58'; Princewill Emeka 78'	Stadium: Rajiv Gandhi Stadium; Attendance: 100; Referee: Mithun Kumar Kundu

== Final round ==
Group champions from preliminary round and second placed team from Group C will qualify for this round. The four sides will play each other twice in the home and away format. The team that finishes top of the table in the Final Round will be crowned champions, and earn promotion.

=== Table ===
Pos	Team	Pld	W	D	L	GF	GA	GD	Pts	Qualification
1	TRAU (Q)	6	5	0	1	13	5	+8	15	Promotion to I-League
2	Chhinga Veng	6	4	1	1	12	6	+6	13	
3	Ozone	5	1	0	4	4	6	−2	3	
4	Lonestar Kashmir	5	0	1	4	3	15	−12	1	

Source: Soccerway
(Q) Qualified for the phase indicated

=== Fixtures and results ===
29 April 2019	Chhinga Veng	1–3	TRAU	Aizawl
14:30 IST	Godwin Quashiga 80'		Princewill Emeka 43'; Joseph Mayowa Olaleye 63'; Yami Longvah 89'	Stadium: Rajiv Gandhi Stadium; Attendance: 300; Referee: Pratik Mondal

29 April 2019	Ozone	3–0	Lonestar Kashmir	Bengaluru
15:30 IST	C. S. Sabeeth 45+3', 68'; Rinreithan Shaiza 76'			Stadium: Bangalore Football Stadium; Attendance: 200; Referee: Venkatesh R

3 May 2019	TRAU	4–1	Lonestar Kashmir	Imphal
14:30 IST	Princewill Emeka 19'; Joseph Mayowa Olaleye 30', 86'; Ngangbam Naocha Singh 54'		Jagaba Hamza 52'	Stadium: Khuman Lampak Main Stadium; Attendance: 739; Referee: Mithun Kumar Kundu

5 May 2019	Ozone	0–1	Chhinga Veng	Bengaluru
15:30 IST			Lalromawia 75'	Stadium: Bangalore Football Stadium; Attendance: 600; Referee: Rowan Arumugan

8 May 2019	Ozone	0–2	TRAU	Bengaluru
15:30 IST			Yami Longvah 8', 12'	Stadium: Bangalore Football Stadium; Attendance: 200; Referee: Prasad Shivanand Surlakar

9 May 2019	Lonestar Kashmir	1–1	Chhinga Veng	Srinagar
15:30 IST	Lalrammawia Rammawia 46' (o.g.)		Lalmuanzova 90+4' (pen.)	Stadium: TRC Turf Ground; Attendance: 400; Referee: Aditya Purkayastha

12 May 2019	Lonestar Kashmir	0–1	TRAU	Srinagar
15:30 IST			Ngangbam Naocha Singh 88'	Stadium: TRC Turf Ground; Attendance: 600; Referee: Harish Kundu

15 May 2019	Chhinga Veng	1–0	Ozone	Aizawl
14:30 IST	MS Dawngliana 48'			Stadium: Rajiv Gandhi Stadium; Attendance: 100; Referee: Tanmoy Dhar

18 May 2019	Chhinga Veng	6–1	Lonestar Kashmir	Aizawl
14:30 IST	Gagandeep Singh Ghattaura 32' (o.g.); Laldinpua PC 35'; MS Dawngliana 39', 90+1'; Vanlalbiaa Chhangte 50'; Lalliansanga 86'		Jagaba Hamza 87'	Stadium: Rajiv Gandhi Stadium; Attendance: 200; Referee: Priyobarta Singh Langpoklakpam

19 May 2019	TRAU	2–1	Ozone	Imphal
14:30 IST	Princewill Emeka 56'; Joseph Mayowa Olaleye 90+3'		C. S. Sabeeth 88'	Stadium: Khuman Lampak Main Stadium; Attendance: 1700; Referee: Om Prakash Thakur

25 May 2019	TRAU	1–2	Chhinga Veng	Imphal
14:30 IST	Ngangbam Naocha Singh 66'		Malsawmzuala MC 33'; Lalliansanga 40'	Stadium: Khuman Lampak Main Stadium; Attendance: 806; Referee: Raktim Saha

25 May 2019	Lonestar Kashmir	cancelled	Ozone	Srinagar
14:30 IST				Stadium: TRC Turf Ground

== Season statistics ==
=== Top scorers ===
As of 25 May 2019

Rank	Player	Club	Goals
1	(Ghana) Phillip Adjah Tetteh	Mohammedan	10
1	(Nigeria) Princewill Emeka Olariche	TRAU	10
3	(India) C. S. Sabeeth	Ozone	8
4	(Nigeria) Joel Sunday	Rainbow	7
4	(Nigeria) Joseph Mayowa Olaleye	TRAU	7
6	(India) Aaren D Silva	Goa (R)	6
7	(India) Altamash Sayed	Bengaluru (R)	5
7	(Ivory Coast) Arthur Kouassi	Mohammedan	5
7	(India) Thomyo L. Shimray	ATK (R)	5
7	(India) Yumnam Singh	ATK (R)	5
7	(India) Roshan Singh	Bengaluru (R)	5
7	(Nigeria) Jagaba Hamza	Lonestar Kashmir	5
7	(India) Lalliansanga	Chhinga Veng	5

=== Hat-tricks ===
Player	For	Against	Result	Date	Ref
(India) Syed Shoaib Ahmed	ARA FC	Hindustan FC	4–3 (H)	16 January 2019	
(India) Liston Colaco	FC Goa (R)	Hindustan FC	6-0 (H)	21 January 2019	
(India) Imanuel Lalthazuala	Chhinga Veng FC	Rainbow AC	3-1 (H)	4 March 2019	
(Ghana) Phillip Adjah Tetteh	Mohammedan	Jamshedpur (R)	2-4 (A)	22 March 2019	

=== Clean sheets ===
As of 25 May 2019

Rank	Player	Club	Clean sheets
1	(India) Zothanmawia	Chhinga Veng	6
2	(India) Aditya Patra	Bengaluru (R)	5
2	(India) Shubham Dhas	Goa (R)	5
2	(India) Dharmindar Guru	Ozone	5
5	(India) Mithun Samonto	TRAU	4
6	(India) Jedidi Haokip	ATK (R)	3
6	(India) Priyant Kumar Singh	Mohammedan	3
8	(India) Fayaz Shaikh	Fateh Hyderabad	2
8	(India) Dibyendu Sarkar	Rainbow	2
8	(India) Abhishek Das	ARA	2
