= Ibrahima Baldé (footballer, born 1989) =

Senegalese footballer

Ibrahima
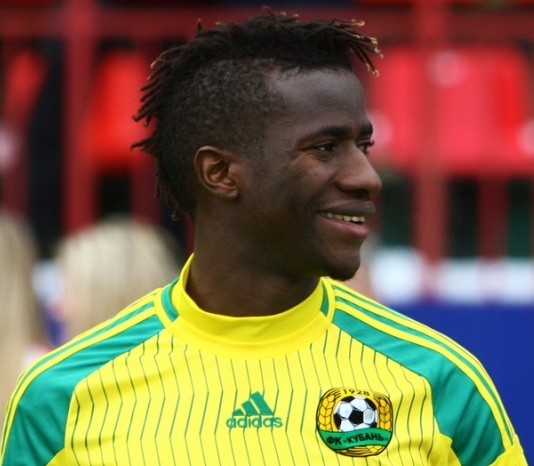
- Ibrahima with Kuban in 2015

Personal information
- Full name: Ibrahima Baldé
- Date of birth: 4 April 1989 (age 37)
- Place of birth: Dakar, Senegal
- Height: 1.90 m (6 ft 3 in)
- Position: Forward

Youth career
- 2006–2007: Argentinos Juniors
- 2007–2008: Vélez Sarsfield

Senior career*
Years	Team	Apps	(Gls)
2009–2010	Atlético Madrid B	18	(8)
2010–2011	Atlético Madrid	18	(3)
2010–2011	→ Numancia (loan)	18	(6)
2011–2012	Osasuna	22	(7)
2012–2016	Kuban	82	(24)
2016–2017	Reims	21	(2)
2017–2018	CFR Cluj	13	(4)
2018–2020	Oviedo	60	(10)
2020–2022	Giresunspor	62	(22)
2022–2023	Boluspor	30	(4)
2023–2024	TRAU	3	(0)

International career
2012	Senegal U23	3	(1)
2012–2013	Senegal	3	(1)
- * Club domestic league appearances and goals as of 01:45, 23 February 2024 (UTC)

Ibrahima Baldé (born 4 April 1989), known as Ibrahima, is a Senegalese professional footballer who plays as a forward.

== Club career ==
=== Early years and Spain ===
Ibrahima was born in Dakar. In 2006 the 16-year-old arrived in Argentina after signing for Argentinos Juniors and, the following year, he joined another club in that nation, Club Atlético Vélez Sarsfield. He later said of his time in the country: "When I went to Argentina I could never imagine how many troubles and personal insults I would have to experience because of my skin colour there".

In December 2008, Ibrahima continued his development at Atlético Madrid, being initially allocated to their reserves. Due to injuries to the first team's attacking lines – Florent Sinama Pongolle had also just been sold – he made his La Liga debut on 2 January 2010, playing the full 90 minutes against Sevilla FC at the Vicente Calderón Stadium in a 2–1 win.

Ibrahima scored his first goal with the main squad on 17 January 2010, in another home victory, 3–2 against Sporting de Gijón: after just five minutes on the pitch, he tapped in Sergio Agüero's saved attempt to make it 3–1.

On 5 March 2010, Ibrahima extended his contract with Atlético until 2013, scoring a last-minute equaliser in a 1–1 draw at Real Zaragoza two days later. He was loaned to CD Numancia of Segunda División in the summer, in a season-long move.

Ibrahima's spell with the Soria side was greatly undermined by injury, as he appeared in less than half of the league's matches. On 13 April 2011, he agreed to join CA Osasuna on a three-year deal effective as of July, with a buyout clause of €9 million.

During his tenure at the El Sadar Stadium, Ibrahima netted seven goals in 23 competitive appearances, including a brace against Getafe CF (2–2 away draw) and the game's only goal to help the hosts defeat Real Sociedad in the league. He was also afflicted by physical problems.

=== Kuban ===
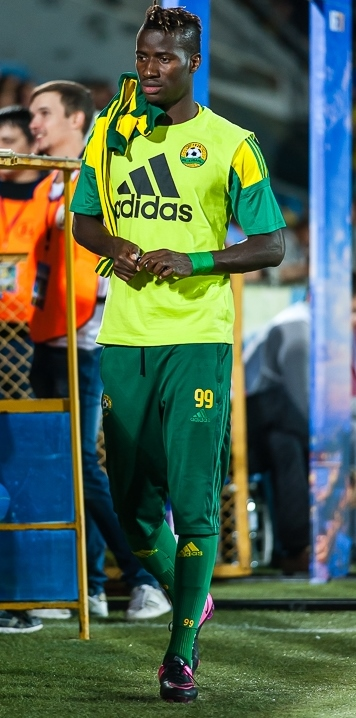
Ibrahima before a match in 2015

On 23 August 2012, Ibrahima signed a three-year deal with FC Kuban Krasnodar; he stated he would not have problems adapting to the new reality, even though his move was delayed due to visa issues. He scored twice on his debut four days later, and also set up a goal for Marcos Pizzelli in a 6–2 win over FC Volga Nizhny Novgorod, before coming off in the 71st minute.

Ibrahima suffered a ligament rupture to his knee during a friendly in early 2014, going on to be sidelined for several months. He netted only four times from 21 games in the 2015–16 campaign, and his team was relegated from the Russian Premier League after ranking third-bottom.

With his contract expected to expire on 30 June 2016, Ibrahima reportedly rejected a new offer in December 2015. General manager Valery Statsenko expressed his confidence on an agreement being reached, and negotiations started in March 2016; on 1 July, however, Kuban announced the player's departure.

=== Reims ===
On 31 July 2016, Ibrahima moved to French club Stade de Reims on a 1+1 contract. He made his Ligue 2 debut in the fourth matchday, starting and playing 79 minutes of the 2–1 home defeat of Red Star FC, and his first goal arrived on 22 October to help to a 1–1 draw at RC Lens.

=== CFR Cluj ===
Ibrahima signed a two-year deal with CFR Cluj in July 2017, rejoining his former Kuban Krasnodar coach Dan Petrescu. He made his Romanian Liga I debut against FC Voluntari on 20 August, coming on as an 83rd-minute substitute for Urko Vera in the 2–0 home victory. He scored his first goals six days later, netting twice in the 4–3 away loss to ACS Poli Timișoara.

Baldé won his only career title at the end of his only season, contributing four goals and three starts to the conquest of the national championship.

=== Later career ===
On 3 August 2018, Ibrahima returned to Spain after agreeing to a two-year contract with Real Oviedo in the second division. He competed in Turkey the following seasons, with Giresunspor and Boluspor.

Ibrahima moved to the Indian I-League in September 2023, joining TRAU FC.

== International career ==
Ibrahima was first called up by the Senegal national team in May 2012, and made his debut on the 25th by playing 63 minutes in a 1–0 friendly win over Morocco. He scored his first goal the following week, helping to a 3–1 home victory against Liberia for the 2014 FIFA World Cup qualifiers.

Later that year, Ibrahima was selected by the under-23 side for the Summer Olympics in London. He played three of four matches during the tournament, netting in the 4–2 quarter-final loss to Mexico.

== Honours ==
Atlético Madrid

- Copa del Rey runner-up: 2009–10

Kuban

- Russian Cup runner-up: 2014–15

CFR Cluj

- Liga I: 2017–18
