= Dimitris Dimitriou (football manager) =

Cypriot football manager (born 1970)

Personal information
- Date of birth: 1 October 1970 (age 56)
- Place of birth: Limassol, Cyprus

Team information
- Current team: Churchill Brothers (head coach)

Senior career*
Years	Team	Apps	(Gls)
- AEL Limassol

Managerial career
- 2016–2017: AEZ Zakakiou
- 2019–2020: TRAU FC
- 2020–2022: PO Xylotymbou
- 2022–2023: Alki Oroklini
- 2023–2024: Irodotos
- 2024–2025: Churchill Brothers
- 2025–2026: Gokulam Kerala
- 2026–: Churchill Brothers
- * Club domestic league appearances and goals

Dimitris Dimitriou (Greek: Δημήτρης Δημητρίου) is a Cypriot football coach who is currently the head coach for the Indian Super League club Churchill Brothers.

== Career ==
In 2016, he was appointed manager of AEZ Zakakiou.

In 2019, Dimitriou was appointed head coach of newly-promoted TRAU in the Indian I-League. He implemented stricter training and fitness sessions. However, despite helping the I-League debutants go from the relegation zone to third place courtesy of a four-match winning streak, he was fired in January 2020, with the club hinting at match-fixing.

After leaving TRAU, Dimitriou claimed that general secretary Phulen Meitei wanted to be coach so prayed that TRAU would lose. He also claimed that Meitei forced him to sign a contract with a clause that allowed Meitei to pick the lineup, and that the general secretary forced officials to leave without explanation. In response, Meitei stated that he was fired for "indiscipline and misconduct".

In 2020, he was appointed manager of Podosfairikos Omilos Xylotymbou 2006.

In October 2024, he joined I-League club Churchill Brothers as head coach. Under Dimitriou's guidance, the club finished as the table toppers of the 2024–25 I-League season, thus earning him the Syed Abdul Rahim Award for Best Coach in that season.

In March 2026, he was appointed as the head coach of Indian Football League club Gokulam Kerala.

== Managerial statistics ==
As of 11 October 2026

Managerial record by team and tenure
Team	Nat	From	To	Record					Ref
Team	Nat	From	To	G	W	D	L	Win %	Ref
AEZ Zakakiou	(Cyprus)	12 December 2016	31 May 2017	12	0	3	9	0.00	
TRAU	(India)	8 September 2019	24 November 2019	0	0	0	0	—	
PO Xylotymbou	(Cyprus)	28 November 2020	31 May 2022	8	4	2	2	50.00	
Alki Oroklini	(Cyprus)	5 November 2022	1 February 2023	11	0	2	9	0.00	
Irodotos	(Cyprus)	1 April 2023	6 April 2023	2	0	0	2	0.00	
Ermis Aradippou	(Cyprus)	3 August 2023	13 December 2023	11	2	1	8	18.18	
Digenis Akritas Morphou	(Cyprus)	26 December 2023	15 October 2024	20	13	2	5	65.00	
Churchill Brothers	(India)	23 October 2024	30 June 2025	21	10	7	4	47.62	
Gokulam Kerala	(India)	6 March 2026	31 May 2026	8	2	1	5	25.00	
Churchill Brothers	(India)	8 September 2026	Present	1	1	0	0	100.00	
Total				94	32	18	44	34.04	—
