= Jagaba Hamza =

Nigerian footballer

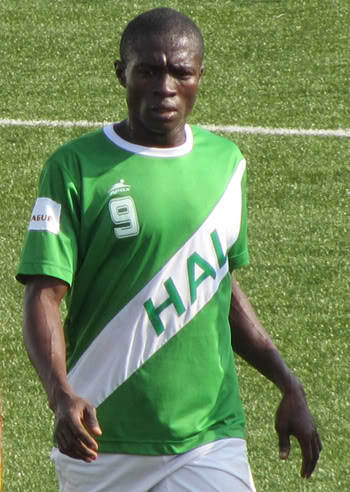
- Jagaba Hamza HAL SC I-League Player

Personal information
- Full name: Jagaba Hamza Auta
- Date of birth: 5 November 1994 (age 31)
- Place of birth: Nigeria
- Position: Striker

Team information
- Current team: Lonestar Kashmir F.C.

Senior career*
| Years | Team | Apps | (Gls) |
| 2010–2011 | First Bank FC | 18 | (6) |
| 2011–2012 | FC Dragons | 11 | (6) |
| 2014–2015 | HAL | 48 | (21) |
| 2016–2017 | Salgaocar | 5 | (2) |
| 2017–2018 | Al Hamriyah Club | 4 | (2) |
| 2018–2019 | FC Bengaluru United | 12 | (9) |
| 2019– | Lonestar Kashmir F.C. | 10 | (6) |
- * Club domestic league appearances and goals

Jagaba Hamza Auta (born 5 November 1994 ) is a Nigerian footballer who last played as a forward for Lonestar Kashmir FC in the Indian I-League 2nd Division. Hamza has been the highest goal scorer for his team both in BEML SC and HAL. He has played in the Indian I-League with HAL and Salgaocar. His highest scoring league seasons so far have seen him score 12 goals in the 2016-17 Indian I-League.

== Career ==
=== Early career ===
Hamza joined the local football club First Bank FC, having been scouted by his local manager Awwal Bello Arab while playing on the streets of his hometown in Lagos. After a year with the club, he moved to FC Dragons in Benin Republic and was loan to play in Tunisia in the northern Africa. In the year 2012 Hamza moved back to Nigeria and signed for Adamawa United in the Nigerian Professional League, Hamza was loan out of Africa to India and played for BEML Sport Club, HAL Sport Club, "Al Hamriyah SC" in Dubai UAE and Salgaocar Sport Club in the Indian I-League.

=== HAL ===
For the 2014-15 in the INDIAN I-League season Hamza played for HAL SC who were based in Bangalore. After his maiden season with HAL, Hamza finished with 23 caps in the I-League and 9 goals and also for the 2015-16 I-League season Hamza played for HAL SC. After his maiden season with HAL, Hamza finished with 25 caps in the I-League and 12 goals.. Hamza left to Dubai in UAE and Play for "Al Hamriyah SC" a loan for 4 months and returned to India.

=== Salgaocar ===
After two season at HAL on 6 May 2016 it was announced that Hamza has signed with Salgaocar of the I-League for the 2017 I-League season.

== Career statistics ==
=== Club ===
Statistics accurate as of 7 May 2015

| Club | Season | League | | | Cup | | | AFC | | | Total | | |
| Club | Season | Apps | Goals | Assists | Apps | Goals | Assists | Apps | Goals | Assists | Apps | Goals | Assists |
|---|---|---|---|---|---|---|---|---|---|---|---|---|---|
| FC Dragons | 2013 | 11 | 6 | 5 | — | — | — | — | — | — | 11 | 6 | 5 |
| BEML SC | 2014-15 | 9 | 12 | 6 | 6 | 4 | 0 | — | — | — | 17 | 16 | 6 |
| HAL | 2015-16 | 23 | 9 | 5 | 6 | 2 | 0 | — | — | — | 28 | 11 | 5 |
| HAL | 2016-17 | 25 | 12 | 6 | 6 | 4 | 0 | — | — | — | 31 | 16 | 6 |
| Salgaocar | 2017-18 | — | — | — | 5 | 2 | 0 | — | — | — | 5 | 2 | 0 |
| Career total | | 68 | 39 | 22 | 23 | 12 | 0 | 0 | 0 | 0 | 92 | 51 | 22 |
