= Rishi Rajput =

Indian footballer

Personal information
- Full name: Rishi Rajput
- Date of birth: 16 October 2002 (age 24)
- Place of birth: Jammu & Kashmir
- Height: 1.79 m (5 ft 10 1/2 in)
- Position: Centre-back

Team information
- Current team: Southern Samity
- Number: 6

Youth career
- Param
- J&K State Football Academy
- 2018–21: Tata Football Academy

Senior career*
Years	Team	Apps	(Gls)
2021–22	Jamshedpur (Reserves)		
2022–2023	TRAU	5	(0)
2023–	Southern Samity		
- * Club domestic league appearances and goals as of 14:03, 14 August 2023 (UTC)

Rishi Rajput (born 16 October 2002) is an Indian professional footballer who plays as a defender for Southern Samity in Calcutta Football League.

== Career ==
Born in Jammu and Kashmir, Rishi Rajput started his career with Param FC and Jammu And Kashmir State Football Academy. He was selected by West Bromwich Albion trials in 2014, in U12 age category, although he couldn't accept for personal reasons. In 2018, he was selected by Tata Football Academy and moved to Jamshedpur FC U18 and was promoted to the reserves squad three years later. For Jamshedpur, Rishi made five appearances in the Durand Cup, where he scored one goal. In 2022, he signed a two-year deal with I-League side, TRAU FC and made five appearances in the 2022–23 I-League season.

== Statistics ==
As of 16 August 2023

Club	Season	League			League Cup		Domestic Cup		Continental		Total	
Club	Season	Division	Apps	Goals	Apps	Goals	Apps	Goals	Apps	Goals	Apps	Goals
Jamshedpur		—	—	—	—	—	5	1	—	—	5	1
TRAU	2022–23	I-League	5	0	—	—	—	—	—	—	5	0
Career total			5	0	—	—	—	—	—	—	10	1
