= Oguchi Uche =

Nigerian footballer

Personal information
- Date of birth: 10 May 1987 (age 39)
- Place of birth: Nigeria
- Height: 1.84 m (6 ft 0 in)
- Position: Right-back

Senior career*
Years	Team	Apps	(Gls)
2005–2008	Lobi Stars	20	(2)
2008–2009	Enyimba	21	(4)
2009–2011	Dolphins	16	(6)
2011–2013	Heartland	38	(3)
2013–2014	Enugu Rangers	25	(5)
2014	Abia Warriors	5	(0)
2014–2015	Sitra Club	33	(5)
2015–2016	Al-Ahli	29	(7)
2016-2018	Sitra Club		
2018-2019	Heartland		
2019–2020	TRAU	17	(3)
2020–2021	Heartland		

International career^{‡}
2007–2012	Nigeria	3	(0)
- * Club domestic league appearances and goals ‡ National team caps and goals as of 11 April 2016

Oguchi Uche (born 10 May 1987) is a Nigerian football player.

== Career ==
Uche started his professional football career with Lobi Stars F.C. Because of his brilliance and commitment in November 2007, he was spotted by an agent for a trial with 1. FC Köln which did not click due to some financial disagreement between the German club and Lobi Stars. He moved in January 2008, from his club Lobi Stars to league rival Enyimba International F.C., on a huge transfer. Oguchi Uche also played for some other Nigerian big professional club sides. After completing his last contract, Uche moved on to secure a contract outside the shores of African by joining Sitra Club Bahrain.

=== TRAU FC ===
For the 2019–20 I-League season, Uche joined for TRAU FC, an Imphal based side.

== International career ==
He played for his homeland on youth side and holds currently one A-National game.
