= Altamash Sayed =

Indian footballer (born 1996)

Personal information
- Full name: Altamash Sayed
- Date of birth: 12 August 1996 (age 30)
- Place of birth: India
- Position: Midfielder

Team information
- Current team: Mohammedan SC

Youth career
- Mumbai
- 2013–2016: Pune

Senior career*
Years	Team	Apps	(Gls)
2017–18	Minerva Punjab	1	(0)
2018	Bengaluru FC "B"	10	(0)
2018–2019	Bengaluru FC		
2019	→Bengaluru FC 'B'	1	(2)
2019–2020	Real Kashmir		
2021–	Mohammedan SC		
- * Club domestic league appearances and goals

Altamash Sayed is an Indian professional footballer who plays as a midfielder for Mohammedan SC in the I-League.

== Career ==
Sayed began his career in the youth ranks of Mumbai. He soon joined the Pune F.C. Academy and played with the club in the youth I-League. He also represented Pune in the Bordoloi Trophy, the Durand Cup, and captained the under-19 side in the IFA Shield.

=== Minerva Punjab ===
In December 2016, after Minerva Punjab were confirmed to be part of the I-League, Sayed was announced to be part of their team. He made his professional debut for the side on 17 January 2017 against Mohun Bagan. He started but only played 37 minutes as Mohun Bagan emerged as 4–0 winners.

=== Real Kashmir ===
On 31 July 2019, he pursued a deal with Real Kashmir he will play in the I-League

== Career statistics ==
As of 17 January 2017

Club	Season	League			League Cup		Domestic Cup		Continental		Total	
Club	Season	Division	Apps	Goals	Apps	Goals	Apps	Goals	Apps	Goals	Apps	Goals
Minerva Punjab	2016–17	I-League	1	0	—	—	0	0	—	—	1	0
Career total			1	0	0	0	0	0	0	0	1	0
