= Harmanjot Singh (footballer) =

Indian footballer

Personal information
- Date of birth: 13 April 1996 (age 30)
- Place of birth: Gurdaspur, Punjab, India
- Height: 1.80 m (5 ft 11 in)
- Position: Right back

Team information
- Current team: Namdhari
- Number: 6

Youth career
- 2007–2009: St Stephen's Football Academy
- 2010–2012: IMG Academy
- 2013–2015: AIFF Elite Academy

Senior career*
Years	Team	Apps	(Gls)
2021–2023	Rajasthan United	9	(0)
2023–2024	Namdhari	10	(0)

International career
2011	India U16		
- * Club domestic league appearances and goals as of 19:22, 23 April 2022 (UTC)

Harmanjot Singh (born 13 April 1996), is an Indian professional footballer who plays as a winger or right back for I-League club Namdhari. He played an integral role in the qualification of Rajasthan United in the I-League. Harmanjot along with some of other Indian footballers were sponsored by IMG Reliance. He have spent integral of his life in Florida, USA.

== Career statistics ==
=== Club ===
As of 23 April 2022

Club	Season	League			Cup		AFC		Total	
Club	Season	Division	Apps	Goals	Apps	Goals	Apps	Goals	Apps	Goals
Rajasthan United	2021	I-League 2nd Division	6	0	0	0	—		6	0
Rajasthan United	2021–22	I-League	3	0	0	0	—		3	0
Career total			9	0	0	0	0	0	9	0

== Honours ==
Rajasthan United

- Baji Rout Cup: 2022
