= L. Nandakumar Singh =

Indian football manager (born 1960)

Personal information
- Full name: Leimapokpam Nandakumar Singh
- Date of birth: 1 March 1960 (age 66)
- Place of birth: Manipur, India

Team information
- Current team: TRAU (head coach)

Managerial career
- Years: Team
- 2012–2014: Royal Wahingdoh (assistant)
- 2014: Royal Wahingdoh
- 2017–2019: TRAU
- 2019: TRAU (technical director)
- 2019–: TRAU

Leimapokpam Nandakumar Singh (born 1 March 1960) is an Indian football manager. He is currently the head coach of I-League club TRAU.

== Coaching career ==
He started his professional career with Royal Wahingdoh as an assistant of German coach Volker Hofferbert. In 2014, he achieve promotion to I-League with the club as head coach. In 2017, he appointed as the head coach of second division club TRAU and in 2019, he achieved promotion with the club. He later became appointed as the technical director of the club and after the dismissal of the head coach he return to the head coach position. In 2022, his club TRAU faced NEROCA in "Imphal Derby" in Group-C opener during the 131st edition of Durand Cup, where they tasted a 3–1 defeat.

== Honours ==
=== Manager ===
Royal Wahingdoh

- I-League 2nd Division: 2014

TRAU

- I-League 2nd Division: 2018–19
