= Khuman Lampak Main Stadium =

Multi-sports stadium in Imphal, India

- Interactive map of Khuman Lampak Main Stadium
- Location: Imphal, Manipur, India
- Coordinates: 24°49′22″N 93°57′09″E
- Owner: All Manipur Football Association
- Capacity: 29,877
- Surface: Grass

Construction
- Opened: 1999

Tenants
- India national football team (2023–present); NEROCA (2017–present); TRAU (2019–present); Manipur State League; Manipur football team Manipur women's football team

The Khuman Lampak Main Stadium is a multi-use stadium located in Imphal, in the Indian state of Manipur. It is used mostly for football and athletics, and hosts the majority matches of the Manipur State League. The stadium holds 35,285 people and was built in 1999. This stadium lies inside the Khuman Lampak Sports Complex. The stadium's record attendance was set in a football match between NEROCA FC and Indian Arrows (2–1; 2017–18 I-League season), with 35,285 people in attendance, on 5 January 2018.

In March 2023, the stadium for the first time, hosted international matches, as India alongside Kyrgyz Republic and Myanmar appeared in games of Hero Tri-Nation Series.

== Stadium ==
It is a one-tier stadium with roofing only on the main stand.

== History ==
=== Upgrade ===
On 25 May 2011, it was announced that the stadium would get floodlights and a new turf.

== Football matches ==
The Khuman Lampak Main Stadium hosts the home games of the local clubs NEROCA and TRAU who play in the I-League. The Imphal Derby gained fame in 2022 during the 131st edition of Durand Cup when competitive football returned to the stadium after COVID-19 pandemic in India. The Government of Manipur declared a half-holiday for all governmental and educational institutions in build-up to the match on 18 August, where NEROCA defeated TRAU by 3–1 in Group-C opener.

=== International matches ===
The stadium was venue of 2023 Tri-Nation Series, and hosted three international matches as India clinched title.

No.	Date	Tournament	Match	Result	Attendance	Ref.
1	22 March 2023	Hero Tri Nation Series	India vs Myanmar	1–0	29,431	
2	25 March 2023	Hero Tri Nation Series	Myanmar vs Kyrgyzstan	1–1	9,563	
3	28 March 2023	Hero Tri Nation Series	India vs Kyrgyzstan	2–0	29,877	

== See also ==
- List of football stadiums in India
