= TRAU FC =

Association football club in Manipur, India

TRAU
- Full name: Tiddim Road Athletic Union Football Club
- Nickname: The Red Python
- Founded: 2 October 1954; 72 years ago
- Ground: Khuman Lampak Main Stadium
- Capacity: 35,285
- Head coach: Thangjam Saran Singh
- League: Manipur State League; I-League 3
| Home colours | Away colours |

TRAU Football Club (fully known as Tiddim Road Athletic Union Football Club) is an Indian professional football club based in Imphal, Manipur. The club has, until relegation in 2024, competed in the I-League, the second tier of the Indian football league system. Nicknamed "The Red Python", the club was founded in 1954.

TRAU made its I-League 2nd Division debut in 2017–18 season. They were promoted to the I-League in 2019, after winning 2nd Division. The club also participates in the Manipur State League.

== History ==
Tiddim Road Athletic Union, which was instituted on 2 October 1954 in Kwakeithel, Imphal, has been a pioneering organisation in the field of sports activities. They have lifted the title of CC Meet, state league of Manipur six times and finished runners up nine times. TRAU was runners up in 1998 Bordoloi Trophy, losing 10–1 to Narbakhar FC, club from Uzbekistan in the final. They began their journey of I-League 2nd Division in 2018, and on 8 May, they qualified for the final round in I-League Qualifiers in their debut season.

In 2018–19 season, they won the I-League 2nd division, their first ever professional league trophy, and gained the promotion to the I-League. On 25 August 2019, TRAU announced Aciesta Sports Alliance Private Limited as its title sponsor. The deal with Aciesta will help the Manipur-based team finance its first-team and development activities and further expand its presence in the top tier of Indian football. In September 2019, Cypriot manager Dimitris Dimitriou joined the club as head coach. Prior to the announcement, TRAU FC signed an agreement with SportiFan Ventures Limited, a sports business management firm based in the United Kingdom, which played a pivotal role in the negotiation process for the aforementioned deal. Later on the club announced Romi Factory as their new kit partner. On 23 October 2019, they roped in Douglas Silva as new manager, and on 1 December, they faced Chennai City. Shortly, his tenure ended as they lost the first three matches as the Brazilian was not at all happy with the supervision of the team.

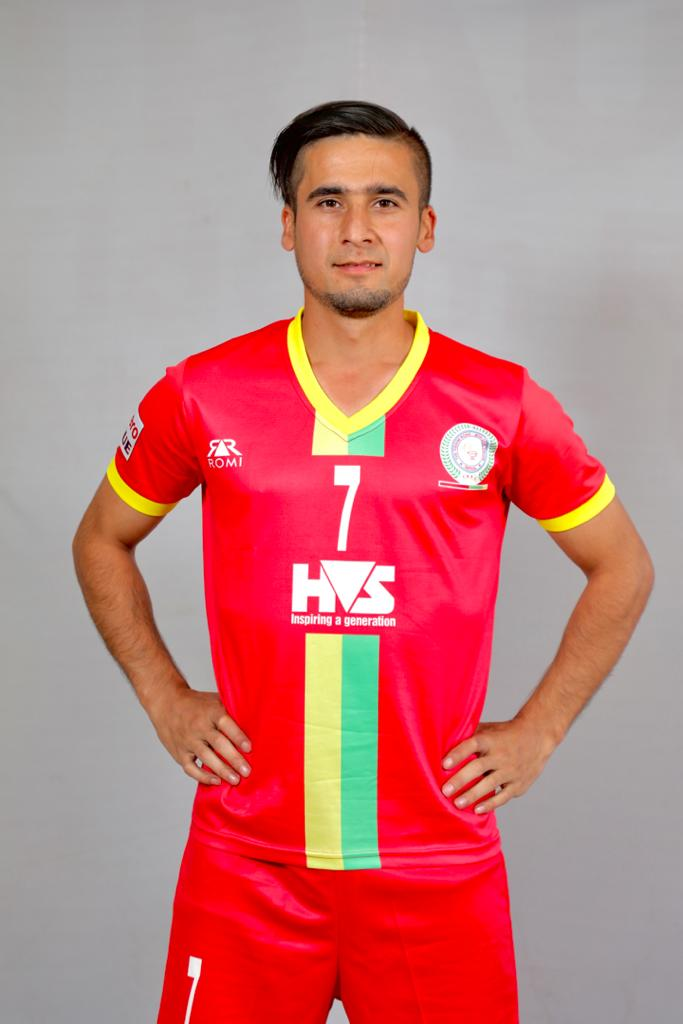
Komron Tursunov, club's first ever Tajik recruit with new kit ahead of the 2020–21 I-League season.

In the 2020–21 I-League season, which was their second I-League season, TRAU finished at the 3rd position with 26 points. Bidyashagar Singh with 12 goals in 15 matches emerged as the top scorer and became the fourth Indian player to win the Golden boot. In that season, the club took part in Shirui Lily Cup. They achieved ninth place in 2021–22 I-League. In 2022–23 I-League, the club finished on fourth position. In April 2023, TRAU failed to qualify for 2023 Indian Super Cup.

In April 2024, TRAU along with NEROCA, refused to travel to Mizoram to face Aizawl in their away matches – as a result the games were cancelled by the AIFF; Both the teams from Manipur were relegated to I-League 2. The club took part in the 2024–25 I-League 2, in which they later fought in the relegation stage alongside city rival NEROCA.

== Kit manufacturers and shirt sponsors ==
| Period | Kit manufacturer | Shirt sponsor |
|---|---|---|
| 2017–2018 | Nike | HVS |
| 2018–2019 | Vector X | HVS |
| 2019–2020 | Nivia | Aciesta |
| 2020–2021 | Romi Bag | HVS |
| 2021–2022 | Ambition sports | HVS |
| 2022–present | SIX5SIX | HVS |

== Stadium ==
Khuman Lampak Main Stadium in Imphal, is used as the home ground of TRAU for all their home matches in both the domestic and regional leagues. Opened in 1999, the stadium has a capacity of 35,285 spectators.

== Support and rivalry ==
=== Supporters ===
A club recognised Imphal fan club by the name "Red Pythons" has been in support since 2017. The Khuman Lampak Main Stadium has witnessed an average attendance of 35,000.

=== Rivalries ===
TRAU have participated in the 'Imphal Derby' with their city rivals NEROCA. The two clubs are the only two from Imphal to have played professional league football. The Imphal Derby gained fame in 2022 during the 131st edition of Durand Cup when competitive football returned to the city after COVID-19 pandemic in India. The Government of Manipur declared a half-holiday for all governmental and educational institutions in build-up to the match on 18 August, in which TRAU was defeated by NEROCA 3–1 in Group-C opener. However, in 2025 Durand Cup Group F, opening again, held at Khuman Lampak Stadium in Imphal, TRAU and NEROCA clashed ferrociously. Notably, TRAU played with only 10 men from 80 minutes onwards due to a red card. The opening match ended in a 1–1 draw.

The club has also enjoyed a rivalry with another Northeast Indian club Aizawl FC at the domestic level.

== Current technical staff ==
As of August 2026

| Position | Name |
|---|---|
| President | (India) Jogeshchandra Haobijam |
| Team manager | (India) Jogeshchandra Haobijam |
| Head coach | (India) Thangjam Saran Singh |
| Goalkeeping coach | (India) Robikanta |
| Physio | (India) Nandeibam Jina Devi |
| Head of Operations | (India) Khaidem Biswaraj Meitei |
| Secretary | (India) Khomdram Gopeshore Singh |

== Records and statistics ==
=== Overall records ===
As of 6 April 2023

| Season | Division | Teams | Position | Avg. attendance | Super Cup | Durand Cup | AFC Champions League | AFC Cup |
|---|---|---|---|---|---|---|---|---|
| 2017–18 | I-League 2nd Division | 18 | 4th | 2,560 | Did not participate ▼ | Did not participate ▼ | Did not qualify ▼ | Did not qualify ▼ |
| 2018–19 | I-League 2nd Division | 16 | 1st ▲ | 1,021 | Did not participate ▼ | Did not participate ▼ | Did not qualify ▼ | Did not qualify ▼ |
| 2019–20 | I-League | 11 | 6th | 12,533 | Did not participate ▼ | Group stage | Did not qualify ▼ | Did not qualify ▼ |
| 2020–21 | I-League | 11 | 3rd | 🔒 Closed Doors ▼ | Did not participate ▼ | Did not participate ▼ | Did not qualify ▼ | Did not qualify ▼ |
| 2021–22 | I-League | 13 | 9th | 🔒 Closed Doors ▼ | Did not participate ▼ | Did not participate ▼ | Did not qualify ▼ | Did not qualify ▼ |
| 2022–23 | I-League | 12 | 4th | 2,155 | Qualifiers | Group stage | Did not qualify ▼ | Did not qualify ▼ |
| 2023–24 | I-League | 13 | 13th ▼ | 255 | Did not qualify ▼ | Did not participate ▼ | Did not qualify ▼ | Did not qualify ▼ |
| 2024–25 | I-League 2 | 9 | 8th ▼ | 1,125 | Did not qualify ▼ | Did not participate ▼ | Did not qualify ▼ | Did not qualify ▼ |
| 2025–26 | I-League 3 | 19 | | | Did not qualify ▼ | Group stage | Did not qualify ▼ | Did not qualify ▼ |

=== Season by season ===
As of 6 April 2023

| ⭐ | Top scorer in division |
| 🇮🇳 | Top Indian scorer in division |

| Season | League | | | | | | | | | Finals | Top scorer(s) | |
| Season | Division | Pld | W | D | L | GF | GA | Pts | Pos | Finals | Player(s) | Goals |
|---|---|---|---|---|---|---|---|---|---|---|---|---|
| 2017–18 | I-League 2nd Division | 13 | 7 | 4 | 2 | 28 | 12 | 25 | 4th | — | (Nigeria) Princewill Emeka | 7 |
| 2018–19 | I-League 2nd Division | 16 | 10 | 2 | 4 | 30 | 25 | 32 | Champions | — | (Nigeria) Princewill Emeka | 10 ⭐ |
| 2019–20 | I-League | 17 | 6 | 4 | 7 | 17 | 27 | 22 | 6th | — | (Nigeria) Oguchi Uche | 4 |
| 2020–21 | I-League | 15 | 7 | 5 | 3 | 27 | 19 | 26 | 3rd | — | (India) Bidyashagar Singh | 12 ⭐ 🇮🇳 |
| 2021–22 | I-League | 17 | 4 | 6 | 7 | 15 | 17 | 18 | 9th | — | (Brazil) Fernandinho | 4 |
| 2022–23 | I-League | 22 | 11 | 2 | 9 | 34 | 34 | 35 | 4th | — | (Tajikistan) Komron Tursunov | 8 |
| 2023–24 | I-League | 23 | 4 | 1 | 18 | 26 | 64 | 13 | 13th | — | | |
| 2024–25 | I-League 2 | 16 | 3 | 3 | 10 | 14 | 30 | 12 | 8th | — | | |
| 2025–26 | I-League 3 | | | | | | | | | — | | |

=== Managerial record ===
As of 6 April 2023

| Name | Nationality | From | To | P | W | D | L | GF | GA | Win% | Ref. |
|---|---|---|---|---|---|---|---|---|---|---|---|
| Nandakumar Singh | India | 1 July 2017 | 17 September 2019 | 32 | 17 | 7 | 8 | 59 | 42 | 53.13 | |
| Dimitris Dimitriou | Cyprus | 18 September 2019 | 23 October 2019 | 0 | 0 | 0 | 0 | 0 | 0 | — | |
| Douglas Silva | Brazil | 23 October 2019 | 21 December 2019 | 3 | 0 | 0 | 3 | 1 | 7 | 0.00 | |
| Nandakumar Singh (interim) | India | 22 December 2019 | 1 January 2020 | 1 | 0 | 1 | 0 | 2 | 2 | 0.00 | |
| Dimitris Dimitriou | Cyprus | 2 January 2020 | 26 January 2020 | 5 | 4 | 1 | 0 | 8 | 3 | 80.00 | |
| Nandakumar Singh | India | 27 January 2020 | till date | 67 | 25 | 15 | 27 | 86 | 96 | 37.31 | |

=== Other records ===
- Fastest goal in a match of India's highest division league: 9 seconds – (Tajikistan) Komron Tursunov for TRAU vs. Real Kashmir (10 January 2021)
- Golden Boot winner (highest goal scorer) in I-League: (India) Bidyashagar Singh (with TRAU, in 2020–21 season; 12 goals).
- First ever TRAU player to score double hat-tricks in a single season (in I-League): (India) Bidyashagar Singh (against Mohammedan and Real Kashmir during the 2020–21 season).

== Notable players ==
=== Past and present internationals ===
The foreign players below have senior/youth international cap(s) for their respective countries. Players whose name is listed, represented their countries before or after playing for TRAU FC.

- (Uganda) Isaac Isinde (2019)
- (Nigeria) Oguchi Uche (2019–2020)
- (Moldova) Petru Leucă (2020)
- (Saint Kitts and Nevis) Gerard Williams (2019–2020; 2021–)
- (Tajikistan) Komron Tursunov (2020–2021; 2022–2023)
- (Uzbekistan) Akobir Turaev (2021–2022)
- (Brazil) Gerson Vieira (2022–2023)
- (Senegal) Ibrahima Baldé (2023–)

== Honours ==
=== Domestic tournaments ===
==== League ====
- I-League
  - Third place (1): 2020–21
- I-League 2nd Division
  - Champions (1): 2018–19
- Manipur State League
  - Champions (2): 2006, 2010
  - Runners-up (2): 2011 2016
  - Third place (1): 2007

==== Cup ====
- Bordoloi Trophy
  - Runners-up (1): 1998
- Churachand Singh Trophy
  - Winners (6): 1960, 1961, 1974, 1981, 2004, 2009
  - Runners-up (8): 1963, 1964, 1965, 1970, 1988, 1989, 2010, 2013–14
- Tiddim Invitational Football Trophy
  - Champions (1): 2007
- Naorem Bhubon Memorial Trophy
  - Champions (1): 2017
- Mayanglambam Chittamani Memorial Cup
  - Runners-up (1): 2004

=== Awards ===
- AIFF Fair Play Award: 2022–23

== Other department ==
=== Futsal ===
The club has a men's futsal section. The club has competed in the All Manipur Football Association Futsal Cup, which is the highest division of the sport in the state. TRAU took part in the inaugural edition of AIFF Futsal Club Championship.

Honours

- AMFA Futsal Cup
  - Runners-up (1): 2004

== See also ==
- List of football clubs in Manipur
- Sports in Manipur
- Tiddim Road
