= 2021–22 Indian State Leagues =

2021–22 season in state football leagues of India

State leagues in India
- Season: 2021–22

The 2021–22 Indian State Leagues season represented a series of highest state-level football tournaments played as qualifiers to determine teams for the 2022–23 season of I-League 2.

The leagues were supposed to be completed before the next season starts, so state football associations can nominate the teams available for promotion.

== Overview ==
No.	State	League	Total teams	Champions	Runners-up	Provisionally eligible IL2 teams
1	Bihar	Bihar State Soccer League	8	Shirsh Bihar United FC		Shirsh Bihar United FC
2	Chhattisgarh	Chhattisgarh State Men's Football League Championship	8	RKM Football Academy	Rajhara Mines FC	RKM Football Academy
3	Delhi	Delhi Premier League	10	Delhi FC	Hindustan FC	Delhi FC; Hindustan FC
4	Goa	Goa Professional League	12	Dempo SC	Salgaocar	Dempo SC; Salgaocar
5	Gujarat	Gujarat SFA Club Championship	17	ARA FC	RBI FC	ARA FC
6	Himachal Pradesh	Himachal Football League	9	Techtro Swades United FC	Khad FC	Techtro Swades United FC; Khad FC
7	Jammu and Kashmir	J&K Premier Football League	16	Kashmir Avengers FC	J&K Bank Football Club	Kashmir Avengers FC
8	Karnataka	Bangalore Super Division	15	FC Bengaluru United	Kickstart FC	FC Bengaluru United; Kickstart FC
9	Kerala	Kerala Premier League	22	Golden Threads FC	KSEB FC	Golden Threads FC; BASCO
10	Madhya Pradesh	Madhya Pradesh Premier League	11	MP Eagles FC	Sehore Boys FC	MP Eagles FC; Sehore Boys FC
11	Maharashtra	MFA Elite Division	18	Ambernath United Atlanta FC	Karnataka Sports Association	Ambernath United Atlanta FC; Karnataka Sports Association
12	Manipur	Manipur State League	17	KLASA FC	Southern Sporting Union	KLASA FC; Southern Sporting Union
13	Meghalaya	Shillong Premier League	8	Mawlai SC	Langsning SC	Mawlai SC; Langsning SC
14	Punjab	Punjab State Super Football League	11	BSF FC	Jagat Singh Palahi FA	Jagat Singh Palahi FA; Sri Guru Hargobind Sahib FA
15	Tamil Nadu	Chennai Football League	10	Viva Chennai FC	Swaraj FC	Viva Chennai FC; Swaraj FC
16	Tripura	Chandra Memorial League	10	Forward Club	Ageya Chalo Sangha	Forward Club; Ageya Chalo Sangha
17	Uttar Pradesh	Lucknow Super Division	19	Techtro Lucknow FC	Sunrise FC	Techtro Lucknow FC; Sunrise FC
18	West Bengal	Calcutta Premier Division	14	Mohammedan SC	Railway FC	George Telegraph SC; United SC

== Confirmed nominees ==
The following clubs were confirmed by their state football associations for the 2022–23 season of I-League 2.

No.	State	Qualifying tournament		Selected	City	Position
No.	State	Name	Season	Selected	City	Position
1	Chhattisgarh	Chhattisgarh State Men's Football League Championship	2021–22	RKM FA	Narainpur	Champions
2	Delhi	Delhi Football League	2021–22	Delhi FC	New Delhi	Champions
3	Goa	Goa Professional League	2021–22	Dempo SC	Panjim	Champions
4	Gujarat	Gujarat SFA Club Championship	2021–22	ARA FC	Ahmedabad	Runners-up
5	Himachal Pradesh	Himachal Football League	2022	Techtro Swades United FC	Una	Champions
6	Karnataka	Bangalore Football League	2021–22	FC Bengaluru United	Bengaluru	Champions
7	Kerala	Kerala Premier League	2021–22	Golden Threads FC	Kochi	Champions
8	Madhya Pradesh	Madhya Pradesh Premier League	2021–22	The Diamond Rock FC	Balaghat	3rd place
9	Maharashtra	Mumbai Football League	2021–22	Ambernath United Atlanta FC	Ambernath	Champions
10	Punjab	Punjab State Super Football League	2021–22	Jagat Singh Palahi FC	Phagwara	3rd place
11	West Bengal	Calcutta Football League	2021–22	United SC	Kolkata	Semi-finalist

The following clubs were not allowed to participate by the state football associations for the 2022–23 season of I-League 2.

No.	State	Qualifying tournament		Selected	City	Position
No.	State	Name	Season	Selected	City	Position
1	Manipur	Manipur State League	2021–22	KLASA FC	Bishnupur	Champions

== Northeastern leagues ==
=== Manipur ===
==== Knockout stage ====
Quarter-finals
KLASA	2
Muvanlai	0
Sagolband United	6
AIM	0
AFC	1 (5)
SSU (p)	1 (6)
United Khawzim	2
KIYC	0

Semi-finals
KLASA	2
Sagolband United	1
SSU	1
United Khawzim	0

Final
KLASA	1
SSU	0

=== Meghalaya ===
2022 Shillong Premier League

Pos	Team	Pld	W	D	L	GF	GA	GD	Pts	Qualification or relegation
1	Mawlai (C)	14	11	2	1	33	8	+25	35	Champions and possible qualification for 2022–23 I-League 2
2	Langsning SC (Q)	14	7	5	2	29	14	+15	26	Possible qualification for 2022–23 I-League 2
3	Rangdajied United	14	7	5	2	21	9	+12	26	
4	Shillong Lajong	14	5	2	7	17	16	+1	17	
5	Ryntih	14	5	2	7	22	28	−6	17	
6	Nangkiew Irat	14	4	5	5	20	25	−5	17	
7	Malki	14	3	1	10	11	39	−28	10	
8	Mawkhar (R)	14	1	4	9	9	23	−14	7	Relegated to First Division League

Source: Shillong Daily
Rules for classification: 1) points; 2) goal difference; 3) number of goals scored
(C) Champions; (Q) Qualified for the phase indicated; (R) Relegated

== Northern leagues ==
=== Delhi ===
Pos	Team	Pld	W	D	L	GF	GA	GD	Pts	Qualification
1	Delhi	9	7	1	1	20	6	+14	22	Champions and possible qualification for 2022–23 I-League 2 (Note: Depending on licensing criteria)
2	Hindustan	9	6	1	2	20	14	+6	19	Possible qualification for 2022–23 I-League 2
3	Friends United FC	9	5	1	3	15	10	+5	16	
4	Royal Rangers FC	9	5	1	3	16	11	+5	16	
5	Garhwal	9	4	2	3	23	13	+10	14	
6	Indian Air Force FC	9	2	1	6	7	18	−11	7	
7	Sudeva Delhi	9	2	4	3	9	6	+3	10	
8	Rangers SC	9	3	1	5	15	15	0	10	
9	Uttarakhand FC	9	2	0	7	9	24	−15	6	
10	Tarun Sangha	9	2	2	5	7	24	−17	8	

Source: The Away End
Rules for classification: 1) points; 2) head-to-head points; 3) head-to-head goal difference; 4) head-to-head goals scored; 5) goal difference; 6) number of goals scored; 7) fair play ranking; 8) drawing of lots

=== Himachal Pradesh ===
Pos	Team	Pld	W	D	L	GF	GA	GD	Pts	Qualification or relegation
1	Techtro Swades United	14	12	1	1	39	5	+34	37	Champions and possible qualification for 2022–23 I-League 2
2	Himachal	17	9	4	4	32	15	+17	31	Possible qualification for 2022–23 I-League 2
3	Khad	13	9	2	2	26	10	+16	29	
4	Hamir Falcons	15	6	5	4	24	23	+1	23	
5	Shimla	12	4	2	6	14	17	−3	14	
6	Sai Kangra	13	4	2	7	14	25	−11	14	
7	Northern	14	4	2	8	15	34	−19	14	
8	Himalayan Kinnaur	11	2	3	6	7	16	−9	9	
9	Shiva	17	1	3	13	10	36	−26	6	

Source: HPFA
Rules for classification: 1) points; 2) goal difference; 3) number of goals scored

=== Punjab ===
Pos	Team	Pld	W	D	L	GF	GA	GD	Pts	Qualification
1	BSF FC	10	7	3	0	16	3	+13	24	Champions
2	Jagat Singh Palahi FA	10	5	3	2	16	10	+6	18	Possible qualification for 2023–24 I-League 2
3	Sri Guru Hargobind Sahib FA	10	5	3	2	12	8	+4	18	Possible qualification for 2023–24 I-League 2
4	Punjab Police	10	5	3	2	11	7	+4	18	
5	CRPF	10	5	1	4	13	9	+4	16	
6	RoundGlass Punjab B	10	3	3	4	17	21	−4	12	
7	Khalsa Warriors FC	10	2	5	3	11	12	−1	11	
8	Principal Harbhajan SA	10	3	2	5	8	12	−4	11	
9	Sant Baba Bhag Singh FA	10	1	5	4	8	12	−4	8	
10	Sikh Regiment Centre FC	10	0	7	3	10	16	−6	7	
11	Dalbir FC	10	0	3	7	6	18	−12	3	Relegation to Punjab 2nd Division

Source: GSFA
Rules for classification: 1) points; 2) head-to-head points; 3) head-to-head goal difference; 4) head-to-head goals scored; 5) goal difference; 6) number of goals scored; 7) fair play ranking; 8) drawing of lots

== Eastern leagues ==
=== West Bengal ===
==== Knockout stage ====
Quarter-finals
1 October 2021 – Kalyani
BSS	1
George Telegraph	2
5 October 2021 – Naihati Stadium
Peerless	0
Railway	4
2 October 2021 – Naihati Stadium
United	3
Calcutta Customs	2
9 October 2021 – Kalyani
Bhawanipore	0
Mohammedan	7

Semi-finals
8 October 2021 - Naihati Stadium
George Telegraph	0
Railway (a.e.t.)	1
12 October 2021 - Kalyani
United	0
Mohammedan	1

Final
18 November 2021 - Salt Lake Stadium
Railway	0
Mohammedan	1

== Western leagues ==
=== Goa ===
==== Phase-1 ====
Pos	Team	Pld	W	D	L	GF	GA	GD	Pts	Qualification
1	Dempo	11	8	2	1	24	5	+19	26	Super League
2	Sporting Goa	11	6	5	0	23	7	+16	23	Super League
3	SESA FA	11	5	5	1	22	11	+11	20	Super League
4	Salgaocar	11	5	4	2	16	7	+9	19	Super League
5	FC Goa Reserves	11	5	4	2	14	8	+6	19	Super League
6	Vasco	11	5	4	2	19	16	+3	19	Super League
7	Churchill Brothers	11	4	5	2	15	8	+7	17	Relegation League
8	Velsao SCC	11	4	0	7	17	29	−12	12	Relegation League
9	Calangute Association	11	3	1	7	10	17	−7	10	Relegation League
10	Panjim Footballers	11	1	4	6	6	15	−9	7	Relegation League
11	Youth Club of Manora	11	2	0	9	14	36	−22	6	Relegation League
12	Guardian Angel	11	0	2	9	6	27	−21	2	Relegation League

Source: Goa Pro League - The Away End
Rules for classification: 1) points; 2) goal difference; 3) number of goals scored

=== GFA President's Super League ===
Pos	Team	Pld	W	D	L	GF	GA	GD	Pts	Qualification
1	Dempo	16	11	3	2	33	11	+22	36	Champions and possible qualification for the 2022–23 I-League 2
2	Salgaocar	16	9	4	3	27	12	+15	31	Possible qualification for the 2022–23 I-League 2
3	Sporting Goa	16	7	6	3	29	15	+14	27	
4	FC Goa Reserves	16	7	6	3	22	14	+8	27	
5	SESA FA	16	6	7	3	27	17	+10	25	
6	Vasco	16	5	6	5	20	25	−5	21	

Source: Goa Pro League - The Away End
Rules for classification: 1) points; 2) goal difference; 3) number of goals scored

=== Madhya Pradesh ===
==== Super four ====
Team	Pld	W	D	L	GF	GA	GD	Pts	
Sehore Boys FC	3	3	0	0	8	2	+6	9	Qualified for Final
Eagles FC	3	1	0	2	2	2	0	3	Qualified for Final
The Diamond Rock FA	3	1	0	2	3	4	-1	3	
Ratlam City FC	3	1	0	2	1	6	-5	3	

=== Final ===
2 November 2021	Sehore Boys FC	0–1	Eagles FC

=== Maharashtra ===
Pos	Team	Pld	W	D	L	GF	GA	GD	Pts	Qualification
1	Ambernath United Atlanta FC	17	17	0	0	77	6	+71	51	Champions, Harwood Champions League, and possible qualification for the 2022–23 I-League 2
2	Karnatak Sports Association	17	10	4	3	50	21	+29	34	Harwood Champions League and possible qualification for the 2022–23 I-League 2
3	PIFA FC	17	10	4	3	45	19	+26	34	Harwood Champions League
4	The Oranje FC (ICL Payyade SC)	17	10	2	5	36	14	+22	32	
5	Iron Born CFCI	17	9	5	3	31	10	+21	32	
6	GMSC	17	10	1	6	34	24	+10	31	
7	Kenkre FC	17	8	4	5	36	24	+12	28	
8	India Rush RSF	17	8	4	5	25	16	+9	28	
9	Bombay Muslims SC	17	8	3	6	21	26	−5	27	
10	Sellebrity	17	8	1	8	41	32	+9	25	
11	DK Pharma FC	17	7	4	6	21	18	+3	25	
12	Millat FC	17	8	0	9	35	29	+6	24	
13	Mumbai Strikers	17	5	3	9	18	42	−24	18	
14	JMJ Sports Club	17	3	4	10	22	41	−19	13	
15	Bombay Gymkhana FC	17	3	3	11	20	45	−25	12	Relegation to MFA Super Division
16	FSI Seaview	17	3	2	12	15	51	−36	11	Relegation to MFA Super Division
17	Salsette FC	17	2	3	12	12	41	−29	9	Relegation to MFA Super Division
18	Companeroes	17	0	1	16	13	92	−79	1	Relegation to MFA Super Division

Source: MFA Elite Premier League Football Counter
Rules for classification: 1) points; 2) goal difference; 3) number of goals scored

== Southern leagues ==
=== Karnataka ===
Pos	Team	Pld	W	D	L	GF	GA	GD	Pts	Qualification or relegation
1	Bengaluru United	14	12	2	0	54	2	+52	38	Champions and qualification to 2022–23 I-League 2
2	Kickstart FC	14	11	1	2	48	13	+35	34	
3	Bangalore Eagles	14	9	3	2	26	14	+12	30	
4	Bengaluru FC	14	7	4	3	38	17	+21	25	
5	Jawahar Union	14	6	5	3	18	10	+8	23	
6	MEG	14	6	5	3	29	23	+6	23	
7	ASC	14	6	3	5	22	25	−3	21	
8	Bangalore United FC	14	5	3	6	19	26	−7	18	
9	Kodagu FC	14	4	4	6	21	22	−1	16	
10	FC Deccan	14	4	4	6	12	29	−17	16	
11	Bangalore Independents	14	4	2	8	16	30	−14	14	
12	Students Union	14	2	7	5	15	20	−5	13	
13	Bangalore Dream United	14	3	2	9	10	20	−10	11	
14	Young Challengers	14	3	0	11	14	40	−26	9	
15	ADE	14	0	1	13	6	57	−51	1	Relegated to BDFA A Division, reinstated later to expand the league

Source: The Away End
Rules for classification: 1) points; 2) goal difference; 3) number of goals scored

=== Kerala ===
==== Knockout stage ====
Semi-finals
A1	BASCO	1
B2	KSEB	2
B1	Golden Threads	1
A2	Sports Academy Tirur	0

Final
KSEB	0
Golden Threads	2

=== Tamil Nadu ===
Pos	Team	Pld	W	D	L	GF	GA	GD	Pts	Qualification or relegation
1	Viva Chennai	9	6	2	1	15	8	+7	20	Champions and Possible qualification to 2022–23 I-League 2
2	Chennai Customs	9	5	3	1	15	6	+9	18	
3	Swaraj	9	5	3	1	18	9	+9	18	
4	AGORC	9	5	1	3	26	12	+14	16	
5	Indian Bank	9	3	5	1	12	10	+2	14	
6	Hindustan Eagles	9	3	3	3	14	19	−5	12	
7	Arrows*	9	2	2	5	9	17	−8	8	
8	ITRC	9	2	2	5	8	20	−12	8	
9	Southern Railways	9	2	0	7	8	17	−9	6	
10	RBI	9	1	1	7	9	16	−7	4	Relegation to CFA First Division

Source: The Away End
Rules for classification: 1) points; 2) goal difference; 3) number of goals scored

: *Note : not to be confused with Indian Arrows

== See also ==
- 2021–22 Indian Super League
- 2021–22 I-League
