= 2024–25 Delhi Premier League =

Delhi Premier League
- Season: 2024–25
- Dates: 26 September 2024 — 13 February 2025
- Champions: CISF Protectors
- Promoted: Garhwal Heroes FC ▲ (IL3)
- Matches: 132
- Goals: 445 (3.37 per match)

The 2024–25 Delhi Premier League was the third edition of the Delhi Premier League, the fifth-tier league in the Indian football system, and Delhi's top-tier football league. Garhwal Heroes are the current defending champions. This edition will see 12 teams compete for the title, 11 from last season and one promoted from the DSA Senior Division League.

== Changes from last season ==
=== Promoted from DSA Senior Division League ===
- Hindustan FC
- United Bharat FC
- National United SC

== Teams ==
- CISF Protectors
- Delhi FC
- Friends United FC
- Garhwal Heroes FC
- Hindustan FC
- Indian Air Force
- National United SC
- Royal Rangers FC
- Sudeva Delhi FC
- Tarun Sangha FC
- United Bharat FC
- Vatika FC

== Regular season ==
=== League table ===
Pos	Team	Pld	W	D	L	GF	GA	GD	Pts	Qualification or relegation
1	CISF Protectors	22	14	5	3	44	14	+30	47	Champions
2	Garhwal Heroes FC	22	13	5	4	48	23	+25	44	Eligible for I-League 3
3	Royal Rangers FC	22	13	4	5	54	19	+35	43	
4	Sudeva Delhi FC	22	12	6	4	52	18	+34	42	
5	Delhi FC	22	11	5	6	49	26	+23	38	
6	Tarun Sangha FC	22	8	5	9	37	42	−5	29	
7	Hindustan FC	22	9	2	11	27	36	−9	29	
8	National United SC	22	9	1	12	34	44	−10	28	
9	Vatika FC	22	7	5	10	34	36	−2	26	
10	Friends United FC	22	6	3	13	27	53	−26	21	
11	Indian Air Force	22	5	4	13	24	56	−32	19	
12	United Bharat FC	22	2	1	19	15	78	−63	7	

Source: The Away End
Rules for classification: 1) points; 2) goal difference; 3) number of goals scored

== See also ==
- Men
  - 2024–25 Indian Super League (Tier I)
  - 2024–25 I-League (Tier II)
  - 2024–25 I-League 2 (Tier III)
  - 2024–25 I-League 3 (Tier IV)
  - 2024–25 Indian State Leagues (Tier V)
  - 2025 Super Cup
  - 2024 Durand Cup
- Women
  - 2024–25 Indian Women's League
  - 2024–25 Indian Women's League 2
