= 2019 FD Senior Division =

Top tier football league in the state of Delhi

FD Senior Division
- Season: 2019
- Dates: 10 March 2019 - 10 May 2019

The 2019 FD Senior Division is the top tier football league in the state of Delhi. The season started on Saturday, 10 March 2019.

== Format ==
16 teams are divided in two groups, comprising 8 teams in group A and 8 teams in group B. Group stage matches will be played in robin round basis. Four teams from each group will qualify for super 8.

Premier League will be played in round robin format. 8 teams will play each other once and league leader will be adjudged the winner. Bottom teams could be relegated to lower division.

== Teams ==
16 teams took part in the 2021 regular edition of the league:

=== Group A ===
- Indian Air Force FC
- Delhi FC
- Garhwal FC
- National United FC
- Sudeva Delhi FC
- Hindustan FC
- Ahbab FC
- Jaguar FC

=== Group B ===
- Youngmen SC
- City FC
- Tarun Sangha FC
- Delhi United FC
- Shastri FC
- Rangers SC
- Indian National FC
- Friends United FC

== Standings ==
=== Group A ===
Team	Pld	W	D	L	GF	GA	GD	Pts	
Garhwal Heroes	7	5	1	1	22	5	+17	16	Advanced to Super League
Sudeva Moonlight	7	3	4	0	16	10	+6	13	Advanced to Super League
Indian Air Force FC	7	3	3	1	19	8	+11	12	Advanced to Super League
Delhi FC	7	3	2	2	19	8	+11	11	Advanced to Super League
National United FC	7	3	2	2	15	16	-1	11	
Ahbab FC	7	2	0	5	10	11	-1	6	
Hindustan FC	7	1	3	3	12	23	-11	6	
Jaguar FC	7	0	1	6	9	18	-9	1	

=== Group B ===
Team	Pld	W	D	L	GF	GA	GD	Pts	
Rangers SC	7	5	1	1	23	4	+19	16	Advanced to Super League
Friends United FC	7	4	1	2	18	10	+8	13	Advanced to Super League
Delhi United FC	7	4	1	2	42	5	+37	13	Advanced to Super League
Tarun Sangha FC	7	3	3	1	10	7	+3	12	Advanced to Super League
Indian National FC	7	3	2	2	19	13	+6	11	
Youngmen FC	7	3	0	4	8	30	-22	9	
Shastri FC	7	1	1	5	3	36	-33	4	
City FC	7	0	1	6	4	22	-18	1	
