= 2022–23 Delhi Premier League =

Top-tier football league in Delhi, India

Delhi Premier League
- Season: 2022–23
- Dates: 15 July – 29 September
- Champions: Vatika FC (1st title)
- Matches: 110
- Goals: 403 (3.66 per match)
- Best player: Ajay Singh
- Highest scoring: Friends United 8–0 Hindustan FC

The 2022–23 Delhi Premier League was the first season of Delhi Premier League as a top-tier football league under the Delhi Football League. The season started on July 15, and ended on September 29, 2022.

Delhi FC were the defending champions. Matches were played in Ambedkar Stadium and Jawaharlal Nehru Stadium in Delhi. Debutants Vatika FC were the winners of the league title.

== Changes in format ==
Delhi Premier League, which acted as a final round in the previous edition broke away from the FD Senior Division league to became the top tier league in Delhi, while the former became a second tier league.

A total of ten clubs from the previous edition were joined by Vatika FC who were the league's first entrants through bidding.

For the first time ever, the teams played double round robin matches thereby increasing the number of games to 110 with 20 matches per side.

== Teams ==
Eleven teams competed in the first edition of Delhi Premier League.

Teams	Venues
Delhi FC	Ambedkar Stadium Jawaharlal Nehru Stadium
Hindustan FC	Ambedkar Stadium Jawaharlal Nehru Stadium
Royal Rangers FC	Ambedkar Stadium Jawaharlal Nehru Stadium
Friends United FC	Ambedkar Stadium Jawaharlal Nehru Stadium
Garhwal FC	Ambedkar Stadium Jawaharlal Nehru Stadium
Tarun Sangha FC	Ambedkar Stadium Jawaharlal Nehru Stadium
Rangers SC	Ambedkar Stadium Jawaharlal Nehru Stadium
Sudeva Delhi FC	Ambedkar Stadium Jawaharlal Nehru Stadium
Uttarakhand FC	Ambedkar Stadium Jawaharlal Nehru Stadium
Indian Air Force	Ambedkar Stadium Jawaharlal Nehru Stadium
Vatika FC	Ambedkar Stadium Jawaharlal Nehru Stadium

== Standings ==
Pos	Team	Pld	W	D	L	GF	GA	GD	Pts	Qualification
1	Vatika FC	20	14	2	4	39	16	+23	44	Champions and qualification for 2023–24 I-League 3
2	Delhi	20	12	3	5	47	26	+21	39	Qualification for 2023–24 I-League 3
3	Sudeva Delhi	20	11	4	5	38	24	+14	37	
4	Garhwal	20	10	6	4	39	23	+16	36	
5	Royal Rangers FC	20	9	5	6	50	32	+18	32	
6	Indian Air Force FC	20	10	1	9	32	31	+1	31	
7	Rangers SC	20	7	5	8	40	46	−6	26	
8	Friends United FC	20	6	5	9	44	39	+5	23	
9	Tarun Sangha	20	5	4	11	30	49	−19	19	
10	Hindustan	20	3	5	12	21	41	−20	14	
11	Uttarakhand FC	20	3	0	17	18	71	−53	9	

Source: The Away End
Rules for classification: 1) points; 2) head-to-head points; 3) head-to-head goal difference; 4) head-to-head goals scored; 5) goal difference; 6) number of goals scored; 7) fair play ranking; 8) drawing of lots

== Awards ==
Ajay Singh of Friends United FC won the Player of the tournament award for scoring 24 goals in 20 games.

== See also ==
- 2022–23 Indian State Leagues
