= Pawan Kumar Joshi =

Indian footballer

Personal information
- Full name: Pawan Kumar Joshi
- Date of birth: 2 April 1995 (age 31)
- Place of birth: Pithoragarh, Uttrakhand, India
- Height: 1.80 m (5 ft 11 in)
- Position: Right back

Team information
- Current team: Sudeva FC
- Number: 2

Senior career*
Years	Team	Apps	(Gls)
2014–2015	City FC	25	(0)
2015–2018	Hindustan FC	30	(4)
2015–2016	→ ONGC FC (loan)	14	(0)
2018–	Sudeva Delhi FC	10	(0)
- * Club domestic league appearances and goals as of 15 January 2021

Pawan Kumar Joshi (born 2 April 1995) is an Indian professional footballer, who plays as a right back for Sudeva FC in the I-League and has represented Delhi in Santosh Trophy.

== Career ==
=== Early career ===
Born in Pithoragarh, Uttarakhand Pawan began his career with IYSA. At the age of 17, he was signed by City FC and won A Division league of Delhi Soccer Association and secured promotion to DSA Senior Division.

=== Hindustan FC ===
In July 2015, Pawan signed for Hindustan FC. He played for Hindustan FC in 2014–15 I-League U19, I-League 2nd Division and DSA Senior Division. Pawan also captained the side and they were qualified for the final round of 2014–15 I-League U19 from Rest Of India Zone. He was later promoted to the senior team. Joshi was a regular in the senior team during their 2017–18 I-League 2nd Division season and they finished as the runners-up in the season.

=== Sudeva Delhi FC ===
Pawan joined Sudeva Delhi FC in 2018, and made his senior team debut for the team in DSA Senior Division. In August 2020, the club won the bid for direct entry into the I-League. The club played its first match against Mohammedan SC on 9 January 2021 and registered their first I-league victory against All India Football Federation's developmental side Indian Arrows. Pawan made his first ever professional debut in the I-League after coming on as a substitute in extra time against Chennai City FC. He was included in the starting line-up of the following match played against NEROCA on 16 March.
