= 2021–22 FD Senior Division =

Top tier football league in the state of Delhi

FD Senior Division
- Season: 2021–22
- Dates: 9 October 2021 – 7 January 2022 (including Premier League)
- Champions: Delhi FC (1st title)

The 2021–22 FD Senior Division was the top-tier football season of Delhi Football League. The season started on October 9, 2021, and commenced on January 7, 2022. Previously, a short format tournament was held for the I-League Qualifiers.

== Format ==
18 teams are divided in two groups, comprising 10 teams in group A and 8 teams in group B. Group stage matches will be played in robin round basis. Five teams from each group will qualify for the inaugural Delhi Premier League.

Premier League will be played in round robin format. 10 teams will play each other once and league leader will be adjudged the winner. Bottom teams could be relegated to lower division.

== Teams ==
18 teams took part in the 2021 regular edition of the league:

=== Group A ===
- Indian Air Force FC
- Royal Rangers FC
- Youngmen SC
- City FC
- Tarun Sangha FC
- Uttarakhand FC
- National United SC
- Ahbab FC
- Jaguar FC
- Friends United FC

=== Group B ===
- Delhi FC
- Garhwal FC
- Delhi United FC
- Hindustan FC
- Shastri FC
- Rangers SC
- Sudeva Delhi FC
- Garhwal Diamond FC

== Foreign players ==
Club	Player 1	Player 2	Player 3
Delhi FC	(Brazil) Sérgio Barboza	(Ivory Coast) Arthur Kouassi	(Cameroon) Aser Pierrick Dipanda
City FC	(Nigeria) Adeyemi Wahab Lasisi	(Ivory Coast) Major Bangaly Coulibaly	
Rangers SC	(Ivory Coast) Bema Coulibaly		
Garhwal FC	(Ivory Coast) Oumar Cisse	(Senegal) Hamidou Dieye	
Hindustan FC	(Ivory Coast) Cheick Hamza Bamba		
Tarun Sangha FC	(Nigeria) Stanley Ifeanyi Eze	(Ivory Coast) Lassine Karamoko	

== Standings ==
=== Group stage ===
Source: The Away End

==== Group A ====
Pos	Team	Pld	W	D	L	GF	GA	GD	Pts	
1	Royal Rangers FC	9	7	1	1	22	5	+17	22	Advanced to Premier League
2	Indian Air Force FC	9	7	1	1	19	8	+11	22	Advanced to Premier League
3	Friends United FC	9	6	1	2	16	10	+6	19	Advanced to Premier League
4	Uttarakhand FC	9	5	2	2	19	8	+11	17	Advanced to Premier League
5	Tarun Sangha FC	9	5	0	4	15	16	-1	15	Advanced to Premier League
6	Youngmen SC	9	4	1	4	10	11	-1	13	
7	City FC	9	3	0	6	12	23	-11	9	
8	Ahbab FC	9	1	3	5	9	18	-9	6	
9	National United SC	9	1	1	7	9	17	-8	4	
10	Jaguar FC	9	1	0	8	7	22	-15	3	

==== Group B ====
Pos	Team	Pld	W	D	L	GF	GA	GD	Pts	
1	Delhi FC	7	6	0	1	42	5	+37	18	Advanced to Premier League
2	Garhwal FC	7	5	2	0	23	4	+19	17	Advanced to Premier League
3	Hindustan FC	7	4	1	2	18	10	+8	13	Advanced to Premier League
4	Rangers SC	7	4	0	3	19	13	+6	12	Advanced to Premier League
5	Sudeva Delhi FC	7	4	0	3	10	7	+3	12	Advanced to Premier League
6	Delhi United FC	7	2	0	5	8	30	-22	6	
7	Garhwal Diamond FC	7	0	2	5	4	22	-18	2	
8	Shastri FC	7	0	1	6	3	36	-33	1	

=== Premier League ===
Pos	Team	Pld	W	D	L	GF	GA	GD	Pts	Qualification
1	Delhi	9	7	1	1	20	6	+14	22	Champions and possible qualification for 2022–23 I-League 2 (Note: Depending on licensing criteria)
2	Hindustan	9	6	1	2	20	14	+6	19	Possible qualification for 2022–23 I-League 2
3	Friends United FC	9	5	1	3	15	10	+5	16	
4	Royal Rangers FC	9	5	1	3	16	11	+5	16	
5	Garhwal	9	4	2	3	23	13	+10	14	
6	Indian Air Force FC	9	2	1	6	7	18	−11	7	
7	Sudeva Delhi	9	2	4	3	9	6	+3	10	
8	Rangers SC	9	3	1	5	15	15	0	10	
9	Uttarakhand FC	9	2	0	7	9	24	−15	6	
10	Tarun Sangha	9	2	2	5	7	24	−17	8	

Source: The Away End
Rules for classification: 1) points; 2) head-to-head points; 3) head-to-head goal difference; 4) head-to-head goals scored; 5) goal difference; 6) number of goals scored; 7) fair play ranking; 8) drawing of lots

== See also ==
- 2021–22 season in state football leagues of India
  - 2021–22 Punjab State Super Football League
  - 2022 Himachal Football League
