= Sport in Delhi =

Overview of sports in the Indian union territory of Delhi

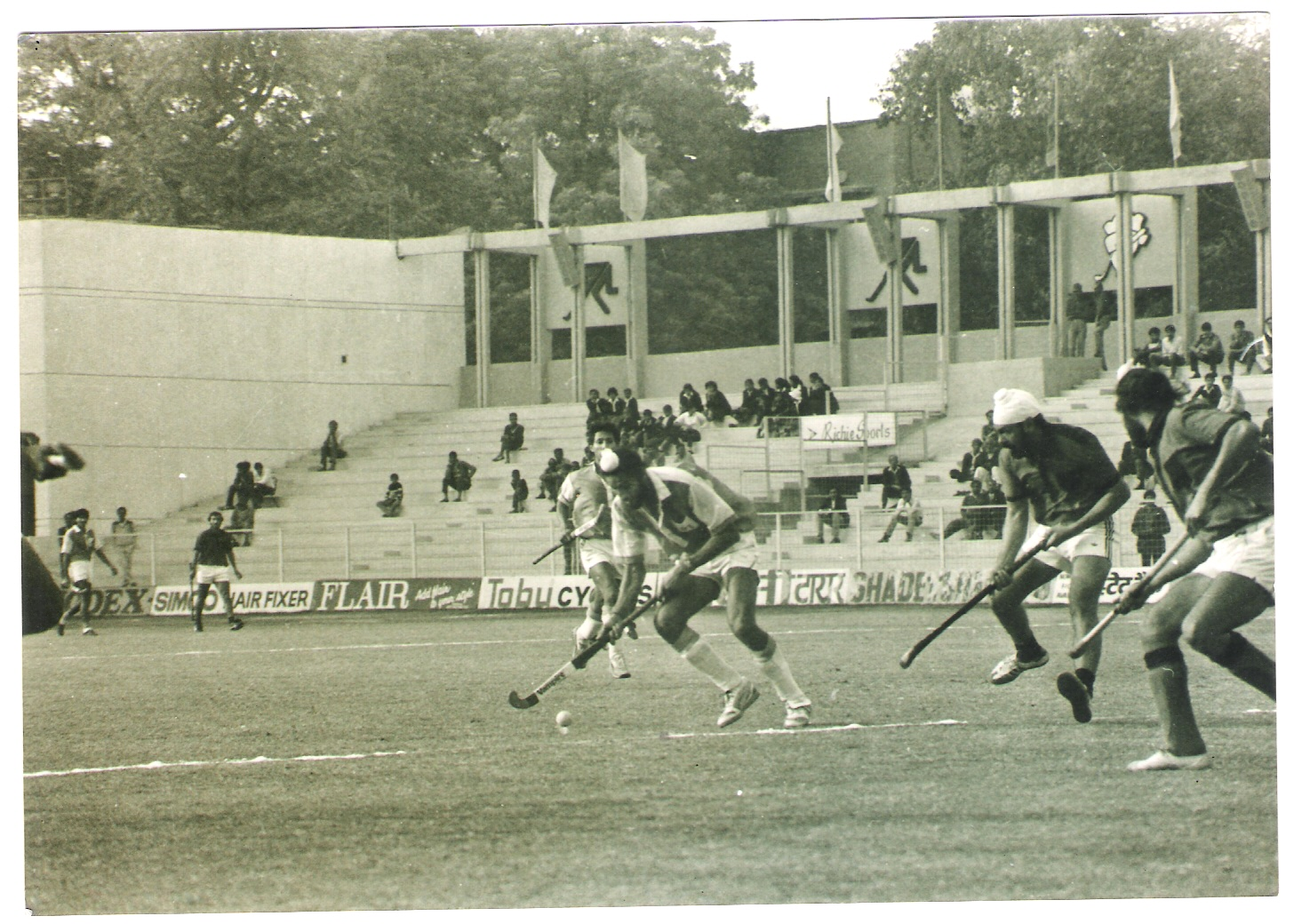
Jagbir Singh in action at the Shivaji Stadium, New Delhi

Sport in Delhi in the National Capital Region has a long and distinguished history. Delhi is the capital territory of India; it has hosted many international tournaments and has professional teams in different national leagues like Hockey India League, Indian Premier League and Indian Super League.

== Delhi Skateboarding ==
Delhi Skateboarding team has been the top team in RSFI national championship 2020, 2021, 2022 2023 2024. Delhi team was also top in First India roller games 2022 and first national inter district championship 2023. Players like Shivam Balhara, Aryan Rawat, Shivam Tiwari and Aadya Aditi have been spearheading Delhi team since 2018. In 2023 while Shivam Balhara is representing India in Paris Olympic qualifiers, Aadya Aditi and Shivam Tiwari are representing India in the 19th Asian games in Hangzhou, China.

== Delhi as the host ==
Delhi has hosted many international sports championships and multi-sports events:

- 1951 Asian Games — New Delhi hosted the first ever Asian Games
- 1982 Asian Games — In 1982, New Delhi hosted the ninth edition of the Asian Games
- 2010 Commonwealth Games — New Delhi became the second Asian city, after Kuala Lumpur, to host the Commonwealth Games
- 1989 Asian Athletics Championships — New Delhi hosted the Eighth Asian Athletics Chancellorships

=== Delhi Half Marathon ===
The Delhi Half Marathon is an annual half marathon foot-race held in New Delhi. Established in 2005, it is both an elite runner and mass participation event. It is an AIMS-certified course and is listed as a Gold Label Road Race by the IAAF. The 2009 event attracted around 29,000 runners who competed in one of the four races: the half marathon, the 7 km Great Delhi Run, a 4.3 km run for senior citizens, and a 3.5 km wheelchair race.

=== 2010 Hockey World Cup ===
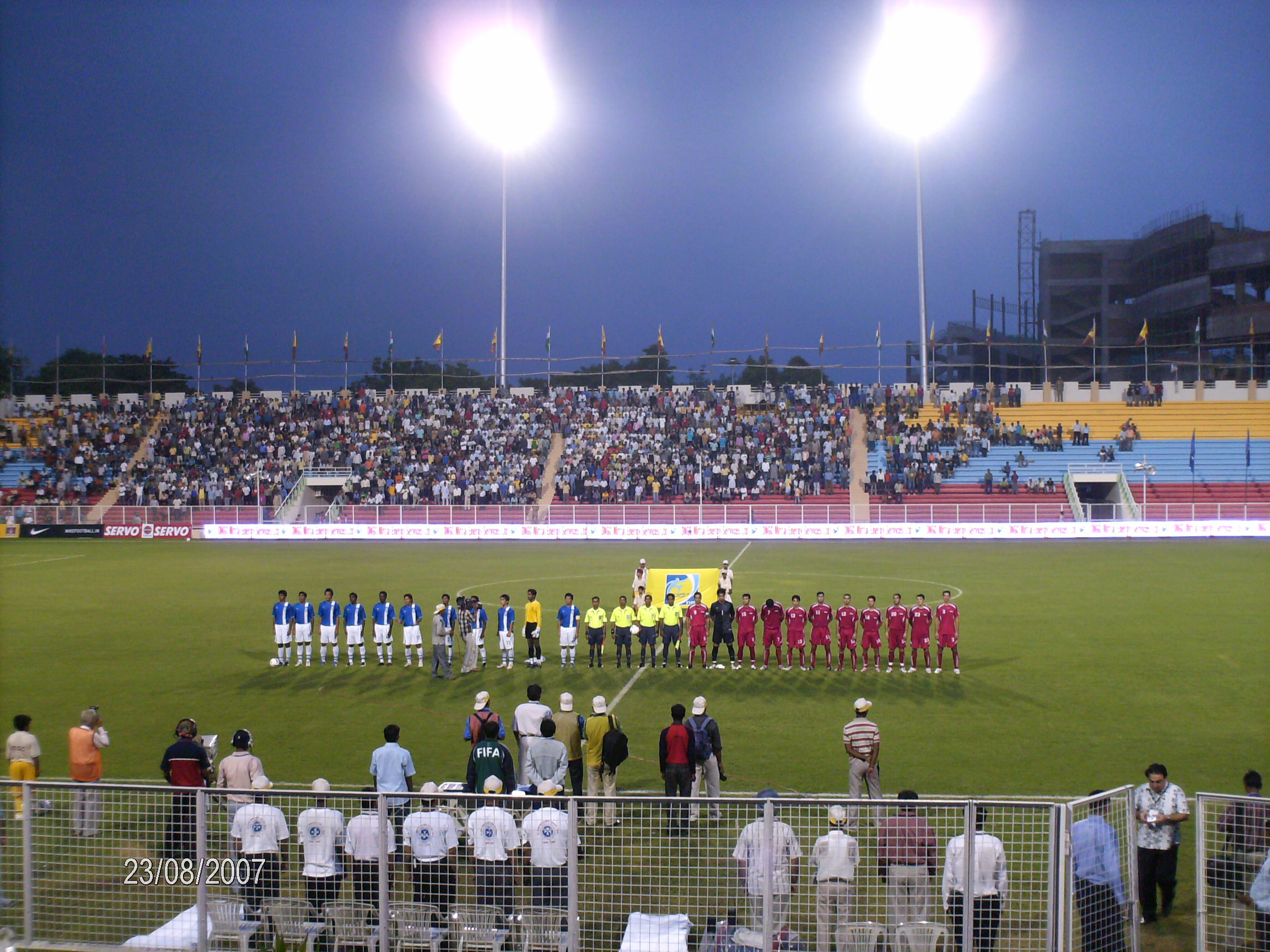
2007 ONGC Nehru Cup: India vs Syria

The 2010 Hockey World Cup was the twelfth installment of the Men's Hockey World Cup. New Delhi became first Indian city to host this major event, taking place over two weeks from 28 February – 13 March 2010 at New Delhi's Dhyan Chand National Stadium.

=== Nehru Cup ===
The Nehru Cup (more formally known as the ONGC Nehru Cup) due to the competition's sponsorship by ONGC is an international association football tournament organised by the (AIFF). It was launched in 1982, but was not held from 1998 to 2006. After the trophy was won by Iraq in 1997, it was reinstated only in 2007.

=== Cricket World Cup ===
Delhi had been one of the host cities of Cricket world cup's three terms held in Indian sub-continent.

== Cricket ==
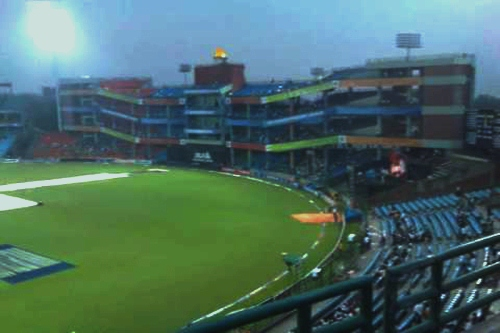
Feroz Shah Kotla stadium, home of the Delhi Capitals

Cricket is organized and established within Delhi. It is considered to be the most popular spectator sport in Delhi. Delhi has several of India's leading cricket clubs. Not only at professional level, cricket is also popular among the people of Delhi.

Delhi cricket team is the first-class cricket team of Delhi, that plays in India's domestic competition, the Ranji Trophy. They have won the tournament seven times and have been runners-up seven. In the Duleep and Deodhar Trophy, Delhi comes under the North Zone team.

Delhi is the home of Indian Premier League franchise Delhi Capitals, owned by the GMR Group and JSW Group.

Delhi District Cricket Association (DDCA) is the governing body of cricket in Delhi region. It manages the Feroz Shah Kotla Ground and Rajat Sharma is the current president of DDCA Executive Committee. DDCA affiliates many cricket clubs in Delhi.

== Association football ==
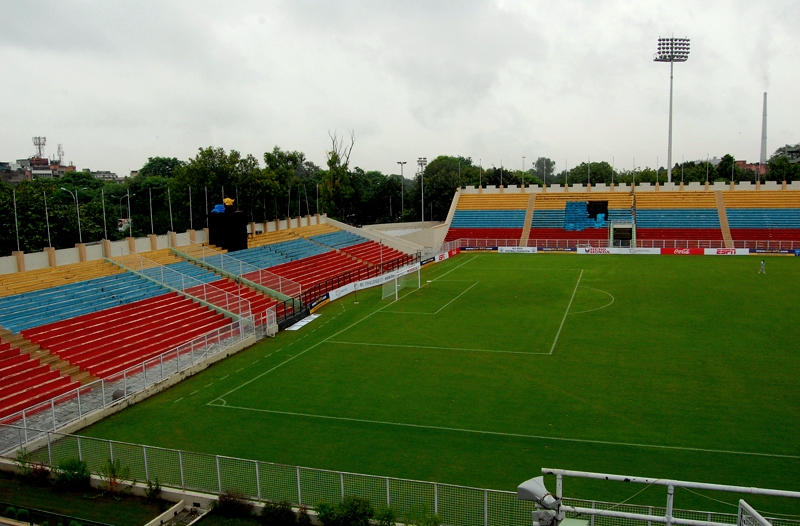
Ambedkar Stadium

The main football stadiums in Delhi are Ambedkar Stadium and Jawaharlal Nehru Stadium. Delhi hosted the Nehru Cup, international football tournament organised by the All India Football Federation.

The mid-2010s saw many football academies being set up in Delhi as a result of gained popularity due to Indian Super League. The FIFA U-17 World Cup 2017 was a major success.

Most notable clubs and competitions include:

- SC Delhi
- Delhi FC
- Sudeva Delhi FC
- Hindustan Football Club, the club plays in the Delhi Senior Division league.
- Delhi Premier League
- FD Women's League

== Tennis ==
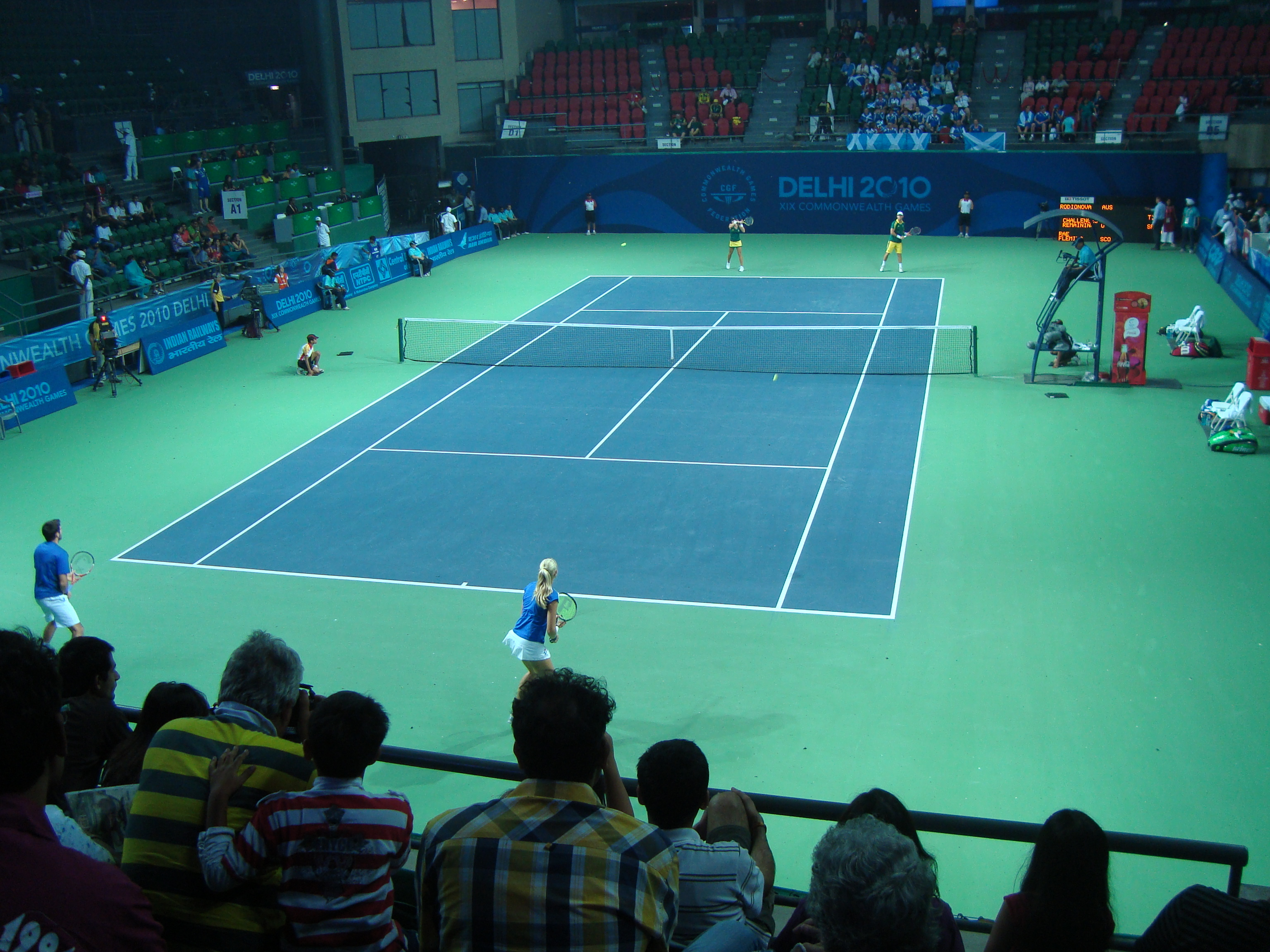
RK Khanna Tennis Complex's Central Court

Tennis in Delhi has been played since British Raj. Delhi Lawn Tennis Association is the governing body of tennis in Delhi, its headquarters are located at African Avenue. R.K. Khanna Tennis Complex is the main tennis stadium in Delhi-NCR for the international tournaments. It also hosts the headquarters of the All India Tennis Association, the national governing body of tennis in India.

== Basketball ==
Delhi is home to the Delhi Capitals, 2016 Champion of India's top professional basketball division, the UBA Pro Basketball League.

== Swimming ==
Swimming is a popular activity in Delhi due to the hot weather. A 2014 news report said that people were willing to queue for seven hours for an opportunity to join a "government-run sports complex, featuring an Olympic-sized swimming pool."

== Ground and Stadium ==
- Ambedkar Stadium
- Bharat Nagar Sports Complex
- Central Secretariat Ground
- Chhatrasal Stadium
- Dayanand Anglo Vedic College Ground
- Delhi University Stadium
- Dussehra Ground
- Dr. Karni Singh Shooting Range
- Feroz Shah Kotla Ground
- Feroz Shah Kotla Ground No 2
- Feroz Shah Kotla Ground No 3
- Gargi College Ground
- Guru Gobind Singh College of Commerce Ground
- Harbax Singh Stadium
- Indira Gandhi Arena
- Indira Gandhi Indoor Stadium
- Jamia Millia Islamia University Ground
- Jawaharlal Nehru Stadium, Delhi
- Karnail Singh Stadium
- Major Dhyan Chand National Stadium
- Najafgarh Stadium, Najafgarh
- Palam A Stadium
- Palam B Stadium
- Rajiv Gandhi Stadium, Bawana
- R.K. Khanna Tennis Complex
- Roshanara Club Ground
- Rohini Sports Complex
- Saket Sports Complex
- Delhi Skateboarding academy, Neb sarai
- Siri Fort Sports Complex
- SPM Swimming Pool Complex
- Talkatora Stadium
- Thyagaraj Sports Complex
- Yamuna Sports Complex

== See also ==
- Sport in India
- 2011 Cricket World Cup
- Indian Grand Prix
