= 2013 DSA Senior Division =

DSA Senior Division
- Season: 2013-14
- Champions: Garhwal Heroes
- Matches played: 57
- Goals scored: 143 (2.51 per match)

The 2013 DSA Senior Division is the 2013 season of the DSA Senior Division which is the third tier of the Indian football system and the top tier of the Delhi football system. The league began on 22 January 2013.

== Format ==
The league will consist of two groups in the beginning stage, in which each group contains seven teams. After the first round is complete the top four clubs from each group are promoted to the next round of the league which will be played at the Ambedkar Stadium.

== 2013 DSA Senior Division Clubs ==
Club
BOM-Ahbab F.C.
Delhi United
Garhwal Heroes
Goodwill F.C.
Hindustan
Indian Air Force
New Delhi Heroes
NVD City FC
Royal Rangers
Shahdara F.C.
Simla Youngs
Tarung Sangha
Veterans FC
Youngmen SC

== Preliminary round ==
=== Group A ===
Team	Pld	W	D	L	GF	GA	GD	Pts	Qualification
Hindustan	6	5	1	0	17	3	+14	16	Super League
Garwal Heroes	6	4	1	1	12	7	+5	13	Super League
Goodwill	6	3	2	1	12	4	+8	11	Super League
Sahadhara	6	2	2	2	5	11	+6	8	Super League
Ahbab	6	2	1	3	7	9	-2	7	
Simla Youngs	6	1	0	5	5	10	-5	3	
New Delhi Heroes	6	0	1	5	6	20	-14	1	

=== Group B ===
Team	Pld	W	D	L	GF	GA	GD	Pts	Qualification
Delhi United	6	4	1	1	13	4	+9	13	Super League
Indian Air Force	6	3	2	1	8	7	+1	11	Super League
Tarun Sangha	6	2	4	0	8	3	+5	10	Super League
Veterans	6	3	1	2	7	6	+1	10	Super League
Youngmen	6	1	3	2	6	8	-2	6	
City FC	6	0	3	3	6	13	-7	3	
Royal Rangers	6	0	2	4	4	11	-7	2	

== Super League Round ==
=== Group A ===
Team	Pld	W	D	L	GF	GA	GD	Pts
Goodwill	3	1	2	0	3	2	+1	5
Veterans	3	1	2	0	2	1	+1	5
Indian Air Force	3	1	1	1	2	2	0	4
Hindustan	3	0	1	2	1	3	-2	1

=== Group B ===
Team	Pld	W	D	L	GF	GA	GD	Pts
Garhwal Heroes	2	2	0	0	8	3	+5	6
Delhi United	2	0	2	0	1	1	0	2
Shahdara	2	0	1	1	4	5	-1	1
Tarun Sangha	2	0	1	1	1	5	-4	1

== Semi-finals ==
4 March 2013

Delhi United	0 – 1	Goodwill
	Report	Frank 86'

9 March 2013

Garhwal Heroes	3 – 0	Veterans
Prasad 29'; Kamai 65'; Al-Hasan 66'	Report

== Final ==
11 March 2013

Garhwal Heroes	1 – 0	Goodwill
Camara 56'	Report

Ambedkar Stadium
