= 2021 Bihar State Soccer League =

Bihar State Soccer League
- Season: 2021–22
- Matches played: 24
- Goals scored: 6 (0.25 per match)

The 2021 Bihar State Soccer League is the 1st season of the Bihar State Soccer League which is the 4th tier of the Indian football system and the top tier of the Bihar football system. The league began on 12 December 2021.

== Format ==
All seven teams will play once with each other in group stage. Top 4 teams will play in knockouts.

== Clubs ==
A total of 7 teams are participating in the league for the first edition in 2021–22.

Club	City/Town
Babu FC	Dholi
Bihar United FC	
Muzaffarpur Sporting Club	Muzaffarpur
Patori FC	
RDPS FC	Motihari
Shirsh Bihar United FC	Muzaffarpur
Sporting FC	Patna

== See also ==
- 2021–22 season in state football leagues of India
  - 2021–22 FD Senior Division
  - 2021–22 Calcutta Premier Division
  - 2021 Manipur State League
