= Remus Gomes =

Indian footballer

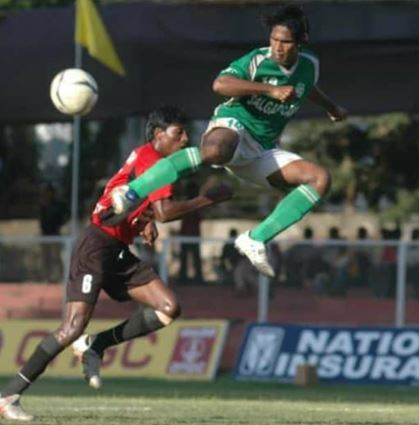
- Remus Gomes in action during his period at Salgaocar S.C.

Personal information
- Date of birth: 12 December 1978 (age 47)
- Place of birth: Goa, India
- Height: 1.76 m (5 ft 9 1/2 in)
- Position: Defender

Youth career
- 1997–2000: SAI Training Centre, Margao

Senior career*
Years	Team	Apps	(Gls)
2000–2001	Vasco		
2001–2004	Dempo		
2004–2005	Fransa-Pax		
2005–2011	Salgaocar		
2011–2012	Sporting Goa		
2012–2014	Vasco		

Managerial career
- 2024–: India U20 (assistant coach)
- * Club domestic league appearances and goals

Remus Gomes (born 12 December 1978) is an Indian coach and former professional footballer. He coached the U-21 and U19 squad of Dempo SC, before becoming the assistant coach of the India national under-20 football team. He has had a long and successful playing career of over eighteen years, representing some of the most prestigious Indian clubs including Vasco Sports Club, Dempo Sports Club, Salgaocar Football Club and Sporting Clube De Goa. His most successful period was at Salgaocar Football Club, where he went on to win the Goa Professional League title three times, the Durand Cup once, and one Police Cup. He played a pivotal role during his six-year stint with the club.

== Personal life ==
Remus Gomes was born on 12 December 1978 in Goa, India to Peter Gomes and Belinda Gomes. He currently resides in Divar Island, Goa, India, with his wife and two children.

== Childhood ==
Remus joined the Sports Authority of India (SAI) Training Centre, Margao at the age of fourteen, and trained in the football facility till the age of eighteen.

== Club career ==
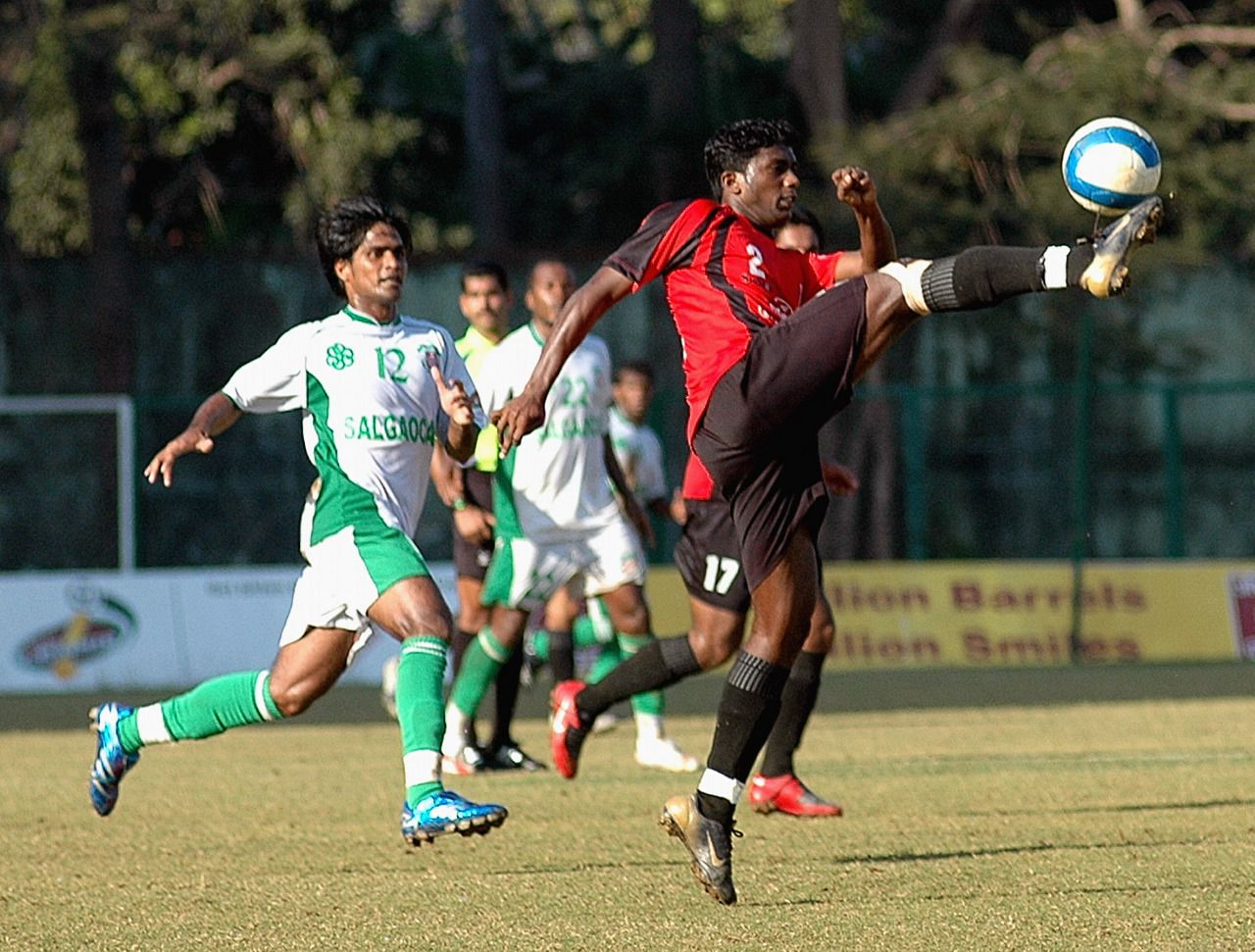
Remus Gomes (running, behind) against N. P. Pradeep (centre) during an I-League match between Salgaocar and Mahindra United

Remus started his professional career in 2000 at Vasco Sports Club, where he featured in their Goa Professional League campaign. During this time, he featured in their Police Cup tournament run, winning his maiden trophy in the process. After an impressive start to his career with Vasco S.C., he moved to Dempo Sports Club, where he played for three seasons, during which the team qualified for the I-League.

After three years at Dempo, Remus went on to join Fransa Sports Club, another team in the Goan top-flight division- The Goa Professional League. This is where he was coached by one of the former Indian players and legends, Shabbir Ali. Shabbir developed a liking for Remus' style of play and his game really flourished under him.

Remus joined Salgaocar Football Club, which was then one of the most well-respected and successful clubs in the country, after his short stint at Fransa Football Club. He represented the club for six years, playing his most successful football over here, having won three Goa Professional League titles, one Durand Cup title and one Police Cup title. It was here that Remus was coached by Savio Madeira, someone who greatly influenced Remus' game. He also captained the club on numerous occasions and is still well respected by the loyal club supporters.

Remus joined Sporting Clube De Goa in 2011, during the team's I-League campaign. Remus faced many injuries during his time at Sporting. He returned to Vasco S.C. in 2012, after his friend, coach Gavin Aruajo called him back, and he represented the club once again in the Goa Professional League for another two years. He was also coached by Subhash Bhowmick during this period and won a Police Cup.

In the twilight of his career, he played for Cavellosim football club and Laxmi Prasad S.C. for two seasons each in the Goa Professional League. He also went on to win another Police Cup during his stint with Laxmi Prasad S.C.

== Coaching career ==
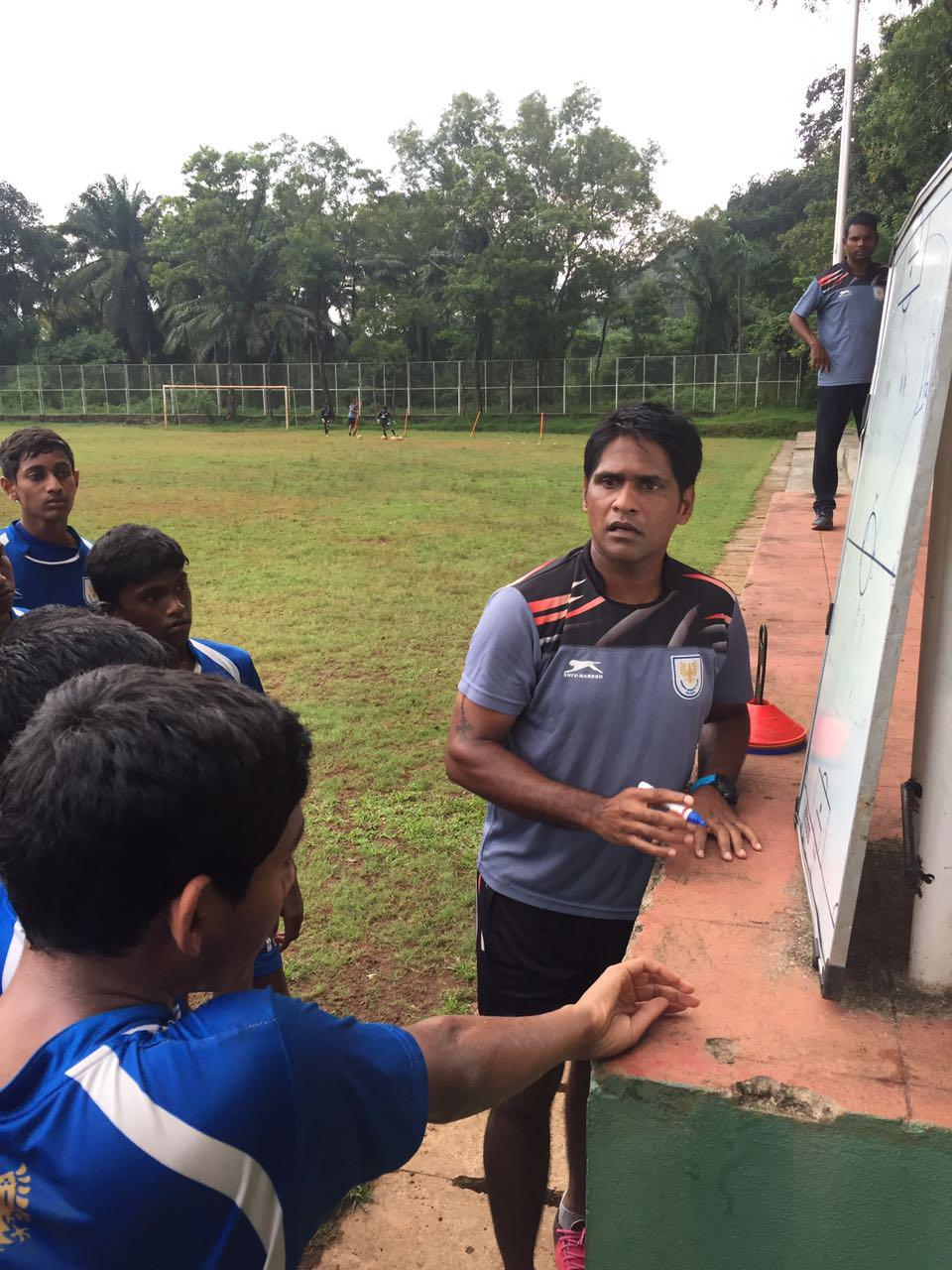
Remus Gomes during a coaching session with the Dempo Youth Academy players

Remus started his coaching career with a brief stint at the Goa Football Development Council (GFDC), where he met Katz Naidoo, who was then the technical head and would greatly influence Remus' career as a coach.

Remus joined Dempo Sports Club upon the invitation of Katz Naidoo, who had a good impression of Remus after their time at the Goa Football Development Council (GFDC). Remus was introduced in the Dempo Youth Development wing as the assistant coach to the U-18 Head Coach. After spending a season there, he was given the responsibility of the U14 and the U-16 teams at the Dempo Youth Development wing. In 2017, when the Dempo S.C. Youth Academy started, he was the first coach to be appointed as the head coach of the U-14 category. Following that, he earned promotions to the U-16 and U-18 age categories, his most notable achievements during that period including winning the U-14 GFA League and the U-16 GFA League.

=== Season 2020-21 ===
Remus was promoted as the head coach of Dempo S.C.´s U-18 and U-20 teams for the season 2020–21, wherein they participated in two competitions:

1. TACA Goa U-20 League: The Dempo S.C. U-20 team won all eleven of their matches, scoring 35 goals and conceding just four during the entire course of the tournament. Remus stated in an interview that the players worked hard for five years, and they were reaping the fruit of their hardwork. He dedicated this huge feat to the vision of the club chairman Srinivas Dempo, former technical director Katz Naidoo and the technical director Anju Turambekar.
2. JSW Youth Cup: The Dempo S.C. U-18 team was one of the teams invited to participate in the JSW Youth Cup. They played five matches in a span of twelve days, remaining unbeaten in the group stages, beating Bengaluru F.C. U-18 (3–1), Sesa Football Academy U-18 (4–0), Roundglass Punjab F.C. U-18 (1-1) and Reliance Foundation Youth Sports U-18 (4–1). Dempo S.C. U-18 lost to Reliance Foundation Youth Sports U-18 in the semi-finals (1–0).

Remus has greatly been influenced as a coach by Savio Madeira and Katz Naidoo, both of whom he considers the pillars of his coaching career. Remus, on several occasions, has stated him being grateful to Srinivas Dempo, the chairperson of the Dempo group, for placing his trust in him.

=== Season 2022-23 ===
For the season 2022-23 Remus Gomes guided his U20 squad to win the GFA First Division Senior Men's League and also won the U18 GFA Division 1. The U20 team also reached the semi finals of the Police Cup where they were knocked out on penalties.
