= 2022–23 Premier League (disambiguation) =

The 2022–23 Premier League was a professional association football league season in England.

2022–23 Premier League may also refer to:

== Association football ==
- 2022–23 Armenian Premier League
- 2022–23 Azerbaijan Premier League
- 2022–23 Bahraini Premier League
- 2022–23 Bangladesh Premier League
- 2023 Belarusian Premier League
- 2022–23 Premier League of Belize
- 2022–23 Premier League of Bosnia and Herzegovina
- 2023 Canadian Premier League season
- 2022–23 Delhi Premier League
- 2022–23 Egyptian Premier League
- 2022–23 Ethiopian Premier League
- 2023 Faroe Islands Premier League
- 2022–23 Ghana Premier League
- 2022–23 Hong Kong Premier League
- 2022–23 Iraqi Premier League
- 2022–23 Israeli Premier League
- 2023 Kazakhstan Premier League
- 2022–23 Kenyan Premier League
- 2022–23 Kerala Premier League
- 2022–23 Kuwaiti Premier League
- 2022–23 Lebanese Premier League
- 2022–23 Maltese Premier League
- 2023 National Premier Leagues (Australia)
- 2022–23 Namibia Premier Football League
- 2022–23 Russian Premier League
- 2022–23 Scottish Women's Premier League
- 2022–23 Syrian Premier League
- 2022–23 Ukrainian Premier League
- 2022–23 Welsh Premier League

== Basketball ==
- 2022–23 Hrvatski telekom Premijer liga
- 2022–23 Israeli Basketball Premier League

== Cricket ==
- 2022–23 Bangladesh Premier League
- 2023 Caribbean Premier League
- 2023 Kashmir Premier League
- 2023 Indian Premier League
- 2023 Lanka Premier League
- 2023 Women's Premier League (India)

== Darts ==
- 2023 Premier League Darts

== Volleyball ==
- 2023 Premier Volleyball League season (Philippines)
