= 2021 Delhi 2nd Division qualifiers =

- Dates: 17–31 July
- Champions: Indian Air Force (8th title)
- Matches played: 23
- Goals scored: 98 (4.26 per match)
- Top goalscorer: Ansumana Kromah (7)
- Best goalkeeper: Sayak Barai
- Highest scoring: Delhi United FC 2-7 Ahbab FC
- Longest unbeaten run: Delhi FC (6 matches)

The 2021 Delhi 2nd Division qualifiers was a qualification tournament for the 2021 I-League Qualifiers organized by Football Delhi.

The qualification tournament was originally set to begin from May, but it was postponed and kicked off on July 17. The 10 teams were divided into two groups. The top two teams from each group are advancing to the semi-finals. Delhi FC and Garhwal FC were nominated for 2021 I-League Qualifiers.

== Teams ==
A total of 10 teams participates in the league. Teams were divided into groups A and B:

| Club | Head coach | Jersey sponsor |
|---|---|---|
| Ahbab FC | | Hajmola |
| City FC | | Ultratech Cement |
| Delhi FC | Yan Law | Spartan |
| Delhi United FC | | Fenuday |
| Friends United FC | | |
| Garhwal FC | Vikas Rawat | Vector |
| Indian Air Force | | |
| Rangers SC | | IJLC Pvt. Ltd. |
| Royal Rangers FC | | |
| Shastri FC | | Browny Sports |

== Standings ==
=== Group A ===
| Team | Pld | W | D | L | GF | GA | GD | Pts |
|---|---|---|---|---|---|---|---|---|
| Delhi FC | 4 | 3 | 1 | 0 | 18 | 4 | +14 | 10 |
| Garhwal FC | 4 | 3 | 1 | 0 | 12 | 2 | +10 | 10 |
| Friends United FC | 4 | 2 | 0 | 2 | 8 | 7 | -1 | 6 |
| City FC | 4 | 1 | 0 | 1 | 3 | 13 | -10 | 3 |
| Rangers SC | 4 | 0 | 0 | 4 | 2 | 17 | -15 | 0 |

=== Group B ===
| Team | Pld | W | D | L | GF | GA | GD | Pts |
|---|---|---|---|---|---|---|---|---|
| Indian Air Force | 4 | 2 | 1 | 0 | 9 | 4 | +5 | 10 |
| Royal Rangers FC | 4 | 2 | 2 | 0 | 11 | 3 | +8 | 8 |
| Ahbab FC | 4 | 2 | 1 | 1 | 11 | 5 | +6 | 7 |
| Delhi United FC | 4 | 1 | 0 | 3 | 6 | 14 | -8 | 3 |
| Shastri FC | 4 | 0 | 0 | 4 | 2 | 13 | -11 | 0 |

== Knockout stage ==
=== Bracket ===
Semi-finals
Delhi FC | 5
Royal Rangers FC | 3
Garhwal | 2 (6)
Indian Air Force | 2 (7)

Final
Delhi FC | 2 (4)
Indian Air Force | 2 (5)
