= Michiteru Mita =

Japanese footballer and manager

Personal information
- Date of birth: 16 May 1975 (age 51)
- Place of birth: Chiba, Japan

Youth career
- Kashiwa Nippon HS
- Nippon Sport Science University

Senior career*
Years	Team	Apps	(Gls)
- S.B.R.
- Kanagawa Teachers

Managerial career
- 2011–2012: Simla Youngs
- 2012–2014: Hindustan
- 2017–2023: Northern Mariana Islands U17
- 2017–2023: Northern Mariana Islands U20
- 2017–2023: Northern Mariana Islands
- 2024–: Myanmar U17
- * Club domestic league appearances and goals

Michiteru Mita (三田 智輝, Mita Michiteru; born 16 May 1975) is a Japanese former footballer and manager who is head coach of Myanmar U17.

== Managerial statistics ==
As of 10 April 2022.

Managerial record by team and tenure
Team	From	To	Record				
Team	From	To	P	W	D	L	Win %
Northern Mariana Islands	2017	2024	7	1	1	5	14.3
Northern Mariana Islands U20	2022	2024	5	0	0	5	0.0
Total			12	1	1	10	8.3
