= Atsushi Nakamura =

Japanese football manager

Atsushi Nakamura 中村 敦
Personal information
- Full name: Atsushi Nakamura
- Date of birth: 18 July 1973 (age 53)
- Place of birth: Japan

Managerial career
- Years: Team
- 2014–2017: Nara Club
- 2017-2018: Singburi
- 2018–2019: Bhutan U20
- 2020–2021: Tochigi City
- 2022–2023: Sudeva Delhi
- 2023–2024: Kaifeng Songyun
- 2024–2026: Bhutan

Atsushi Nakamura (Japanese: 中村 敦, born 18 July 1973) is a Japanese professional football coach.

== Career ==
Nakamura started his managerial career with Japanese fifth tier side Nara Club, helping them win the league and earn promotion to the Japanese fourth tier. In 2017, he was appointed manager of Singburi in Thailand, but left due to unpaid wages. In 2018, Nakamura was appointed as coach of Bhutan U20.

In 2020, he was appointed manager of Japanese fifth tier club Tochigi City, helping them win the league. In 2022, he was appointed manager of Sudeva Delhi in the Indian second tier, becoming the first Japanese manager in India.

On 7 August 2024, Nakamura was appointed as the head coach of the Bhutan national team.
