= Chhatrasal Stadium =

Sports venue in Delhi, India

- Interactive map of Chhatrasal Stadium
- Location: North Delhi, Delhi
- Coordinates: 28.7038°N 77.1874°E
- Capacity: 16,000
- Surface: Grass

Tenants
- Football Delhi; Sudeva Delhi FC; Delhi FC

The Chhatrasal Stadium is a sports stadium in North Delhi. The stadium is famous for its wrestlers, such as Yogeshwar Dutt, Ravi Kumar Dahiya, Sushil Kumar, Bajrang Punia, Amit Kumar Dahiya and Aman Sehrawat who have won medals at Olympic Games, Commonwealth Games, Asian Games and numerous World championships. The stadium also hosts athletics, Basketball, Archery, Football and Kabaddi matches. The stadium is currently used mostly by the I-League 2 club Sudeva Delhi FC.

== History ==
The stadium is named after Maharaja Chhatrasal whose figure is mounted with black marble near the entry gate. The original stadium was built in early 1980. During the 2010 Delhi Commonwealth Games it was renovated with a new and advanced track. The stadium is directed by Dronacharya Awardee, Satpal Singh.

The stadium has an approximate capacity of 16,000.

== Location ==
Chhatrasal Stadium is located within walking distance of Model Town Metro Station and Azadpur metro station. There are 13 entry gates. The stadium is often closed on Sundays while training for various disciplines takes place in the morning and evening times.
