= Chencho Dorji =

Bhutanese football manager

Personal information
- Full name: Chencho Dorji
- Date of birth: 1 January 1980 (age 46)
- Place of birth: Mongar, Bhutan

Team information
- Current team: Bhutan Football Federation (technical director)

Managerial career
- Years: Team
- 2014–2018: Bhutan U-17
- 2019–2020: NEROCA
- 2020–2022: Sudeva Delhi
- 2023–2024: Sudeva Delhi (technical director)
- 2026–: Bhutan U-23
- 2026: Bhutan (caretaker/assistant)

Chencho Dorji (born 1 January 1980 in Mongar) is a Bhutanese football manager/head coach. Besides Bhutan, he has coached in India.

== Managerial career ==
Dorji completed his C-License coaching course in 2005. He served a number of different age-group teams over the years. Dorji worked as the head coach of the Bhutan youth national teams before his move to the Indian I-League. "The I-League is one of the biggest leagues in South Asia and it has teams that have been playing at such a high level for many years. We have been preparing well and no team should take us lightly. We can certainly come up with surprise results;" Dorji said about his move to Sudeva.

"It is a great honour to be part of the I-League. I really thank the president and the vice-president for believing in me and deciding to give the huge responsibility. lf you do well, you will survive and I am very excited about this challenge. As with every head coach, I also want to win. l want to win all the matches, but that does not happen in football."

— Chencho Dorji, after becoming the coach of Sudeva.

Dorji became the coach of Sudeva again in 2023, and guided the team in the I-League 2.

== Statistics ==
As of 26 January 2021

Team	From	To	Record				
Team	From	To	G	W	D	L	Win %
Sudeva Delhi	22 September 2020	31 May 2022	14	5	3	6	35.71
Total			14	5	3	6	35.71
