= Lal Bahadur Shastri Cup =

- Organiser(s): Shastri Football Club
- Founded: 1978; 48 years ago
- Abolished: 2006; 20 years ago
- Region: India
- Teams: 10
- Last champions: Indian Air Force
- Most championships: Indian Air Force; Simla Youngs FC; AOC Secunderabad (2 titles each)

Lal Bahadur Shastri Cup, also known as the Lal Bahadur Shastri Memorial Football Tournament, is an Indian association football tournament held in Delhi and organized by Shastri Football Club. The tournament was first started in 1978 in the memory of former Indian prime minister Lal Bahadur Shastri and is named after him. Apart from some top clubs from Delhi, clubs from neighbouring states also participated in the tournament.

Lal Bahadur Shastri Cup 14th edition returned after 6 years of gap in 2004, with the last tournament being held in 2006 was won by Indian Air Force. The tournament has not been held since then.

== Results ==
List of Lal Bahadur Shastri Cup finals
Year	Champions	Score	Runners-up	Note
1978	DESU and Aryan FC (joint winners)			
1979	Youngsters FC and Simla Youngs FC (joint winners)			
1980	New Delhi Heroes FC and Garhwal Heroes (joint winners)			
1981	Delhi Police	–	Indian Air Force	
1983	Indian Air Force	–	Garhwal Heroes	
1985	Simla Youngs FC	–	Goans SC	
1986	AOC Secunderabad	–	Benares Heroes	
1992	Indian National FC	–	Shastri FC	
1993	Ludhiana Police	–	Shastri FC	
1994	Shastri FC	–	Ludhiana Police	
1995	AOC Secunderabad	–		
1997	Rail Coach Factory	–	DFA Varanasi	
1998	Indian Bank	1–0	Delhi Blues XI	
2004	Tata Football Academy	2–0	Bengal Mumbai FC	
2005	Punjab State Electricity Board	3–1	South-East-Central Railway	
2006	Indian Air Force	1–1, 2–2, 5–4 (p)	Garhwal Heroes	
