= Hindustan FC =

Indian association football club

Hindustan
- Full name: Hindustan Football Club
- Short name: HFC
- Founded: 1948; 78 years ago
- Ground: Ambedkar Stadium
- Capacity: 35,000
- League: Delhi Premier League
- Website: hindustanfc.in
Home colours	Away colours	Third colours

Hindustan Football Club is an Indian professional football club based in New Delhi. Affiliated with the Football Delhi (FD), the club currently participates in the Delhi Premier League.

Founded in 1948, Hindustan predominantly participated in the I-League 2nd Division, which was then second tier of the Indian football league system.

== History ==
=== Formation and early history ===
Hindustan FC was founded in New Delhi Chittaranjan Park area. Owned and run by Bengalis, it is one of the oldest football clubs in the capital city of India. They for the first time lifted the regional league title in 2001–02 season. while club's goalkeeper Salim Ansari was presented the player of the year award. In November 2002, Hindustan participated in the inaugural edition of Delhi Lt. Governor's Cup and reached to the semi-finals. The club later competed in the National Football League Second Division continuously, in 2004–05, 2005–06 and 2006–07, but were not granted the permission of joining the newly formed I-League 2nd Division. In 2007, Hindustan FC roped in their first foreign coach, Bernard Operanozie from Nigeria. Hindustan clinched their second DSA Senior Division title in 2009 season as co-winners with Indian National.

=== Present years ===
Hindustan Football Academy was started by the former club chairman D. K. Bose, and they roped in Spanish professional coach Óscar Bruzón on board for a period of two years to train Delhi's budding footballers in the age group of under-12 and under-16. Hindustan FC, founded just after the independence of India, have been the flag bearers from the capital in the second tier of Indian football, having participated for a record 14 times. They also participated in the 2014 I-League 2nd Division and moved to the final round of I-League Qualifiers. The club ended their campaign finishing on fifth position, earning four points in eight matches.

Though their biggest achievement is finishing as the runners-up in the 2017–18 I-League 2nd Division, under the coaching of Vikrant Sharma. In the 2018–19 I-League 2nd Division, Hindustan finished at the bottom of the Group A and bowed out of the tournament. The club has participated in the 2021 FD Senior Division, and finished as runners-up.

== Stadium ==
Ambedkar Stadium has been used as the clubs' home ground for most of their DSA Senior Division/DPL League matches. It has also hosted their I-League 2nd Division matches. The stadium has a capacity of 35,000 spectators. Hindustan also uses Thyagaraj Sports Complex ground. The club formerly used Government of India press grounds for matches of DSA B-Division League.

== Rivalries ==
Hindustan FC has nurtured rivalries with other Delhi-based clubs, predominantly with Garhwal, Simla Youngs, Indian Air Force, New Delhi Heroes and Sudeva Moonlight (now 'Sudeva Delhi'). Besides the state league, they faced some more rivals in the prestigious Durand Cup, the oldest existing club football tournament in Asia and third oldest in the world.

== Kit manufacturers and shirt sponsors ==
Period	Kit manufacturer	Shirt sponsor
1996—1998		Phoenix Shoes
1998—2000		LML
2000—2003		Electrolux
2003—2005		Coca-Cola India
2005—2006		
2006—2008		Group 4 Securicor
2008—2010		ONGC
2010—2012		SAIL
2012—2014	Lotto	Solutrean
2014—2020	Cosco	Hero MotoCorp

== Women's team ==
On 29 November 2012, Hindustan FC launched its women's team with the unveiling of team jersey. At a press conference, Hindustan president Sushil Pandit said that the decision to launch the team was in line with the club philosophy to support women's football.

Delhi Soccer Association is looking to start its women's league and Hindustan FC would not want to be left behind.

— Sushil Pandit, President of Hindustan FC, after launching their women's team ahead of the Delhi Women's League in 2012.

The women's team competes in the Delhi Women's Football League, organised by Football Delhi. Its U17 women's team has been participating in the Khelo India Women's League since 2019.

== Youth & academy ==
Hindustan FC ran U-13, U-15 and U-17 level teams and academies, which were based at the Thygaraja Stadium. In 2013, the club launched its U19 team to participate in the Elite League (India). The U19 team was from Delhi zone and first participated in the 2014–15 I-League U19 season (group D – rest of India), and reached the final round.

The club also established an academy, named Hindustan Football Academy. They also organize a youth football tournament yearly in Delhi, known as Hind Kishore School Tournament.

== Honours ==
=== League ===
- I-League 2nd Division
  - Runners-up (1): 2017–18
- DSA/FD Senior Division League
  - Champions (2): 2001–02, 2008–09 (Note: Joint-winners (with "Indian National FC").)
  - Runners-up (7): 1996, 1998, 2000, 2002–03, 2005, 2008–09, 2021–22

=== Cup ===
- Lal Bahadur Shastri Cup
  - Runners-up (1): 1995
- Dharamvir Walia Memorial Cup
  - Winners (1): 2013

== Notable players ==
For current and former notable Hindustan FC players with a Wikipedia article, see: Hindustan FC players.

== Managerial history ==
Name	Nationality	Years	Ref.
Bernard Operanozie	Nigeria	2007–2008	
Monoranjan Bhattacharya	India	2008–2009	
Tope Ayodeji Fuja	Nigeria	2011–2012	
Michiteru Mita	Japan	2012–2014	
Abhijoy basu	India	2014–2017	
Bernard Operanozie	Nigeria	2017	
Vikrant Sharma	India	2017–2018	
Sena Sena	India	2018	

== See also ==
- List of football clubs in Delhi
- Sport in Delhi
