= Bihar Soccer League =

Football league in Bihar, India

- Organising body: Bihar Football Association; Shirsh Sports Pvt Ltd.
- Founded: 2021; 5 years ago
- Country: India
- Divisions: 1
- Number of clubs: 7
- Level on pyramid: 5
- Promotion to: I-League 3
- Current: 2021

The Bihar Soccer League, also known as Bihar State Soccer League, is the top-tier state football league in the Indian state of Bihar, conducted by Bihar Football Association with Shirsh Sports Pvt Ltd.

All matches are played on 3 venues: Motihari, Patna and Muzaffarpur.

== Clubs ==
Club	City/Town
Babu FC	Dholi
Bihar United FC	
Muzaffarpur Sporting Club	Muzaffarpur
Patori FC	Patori
RDPS FC	Motihari
Shirsh Bihar United FC	Muzaffarpur
Sporting FC	Patna
