= Najafgarh Stadium =

Stadium in Najafgarh, Delhi, India

- Location in Delhi
- Location: Najafgarh, National Capital Region
- Coordinates: 28°36′40″N 76°59′19″E
- Owner: Delhi Development Authority
- Capacity: n/a

Construction
- Opened: 2000

Najafgarh Ground or Najafgarh Stadium is a District Level Stadium Located in the Najafgarh area of Delhi, National Capital Region. It was Established in 2000. The ground hosted a match between Manish Warriors and Canada cricket team when Canada cricket team toured India in November 2010 for practice for 2011 Cricket World Cup.

The stadium is owned and managed by Government of Delhi. The stadium is only place in Najafgarh that can host sport event. It was made open to general public by Government of Delhi on 19 May 2015.

== See also ==
- Feroz Shah Kotla Ground
