= Bihar Football Association =

State governing body of Football in Bihar

- Sport: Football
- Jurisdiction: Bihar
- Membership: 38 district associations
- Abbreviation: BFA
- Founded: 1968
- Affiliation: All India Football Federation (AIFF)
- Affiliation date: 24 OCTOBER 2026
- Headquarters: House No. L3/6, Sri Krishna Puri, Boring Road, Patna – 800001, Bihar
- President: Shri Jai Bahadur Singh
- Secretary: Shri Shyam Babu Singh

The Bihar Football Association is the state governing body of football in Bihar, India. The Bihar men's and women's football team are administered by the association. It is affiliated with the All India Football Federation, the national administrating body for football in India. The Bihar State Soccer League is the top-flight football league of Bihar. The association sends state teams for Santosh Trophy and Rajmata Jijabai Trophy.

== State teams ==
=== Men ===
- Bihar football team
- Bihar under-20 football team
- Bihar under-15 football team
- Bihar under-13 football team

=== Women ===
- Bihar women's football team
- Bihar women's under-19 football team
- Bihar women's under-17 football team

== Affiliated district associations ==
All 38 districts of Bihar are affiliated with the Bihar Football Association.

No.	Association	District	President
1	Araria District Football Association	Araria	
2	Arwal District Football Association	Arwal	
3	Aurangabad District Football Association	Aurangabad	
4	Banka District Football Association	Banka	
5	Begusarai District Football Association	Begusarai	
6	Bhagalpur District Football Association	Bhagalpur	
7	Bhojpur District Football Association	Bhojpur	
8	Buxar District Football Association	Buxar	
9	Darbhanga District Football Association	Darbhanga	
10	East Champaran District Football Association	East Champaran	
11	Gaya District Football Association	Gaya Secretary Abhay Singh, President R.K. Sinha	
12	Gopalganj District Football Association	Gopalganj	
13	Jamui District Football Association	Jamui	
14	Jehanabad District Football Association	Jehanabad	
15	Khagaria District Football Association	Khagaria	
16	Kishanganj District Football Association	Kishanganj	
17	Kaimur District Football Association	Kaimur Secretary Nirmal Singh , President Virender Pratap Singh	
18	Katihar District Football Association	Katihar	
19	Lakhisarai District Football Association	Lakhisarai	
20	Madhubani District Football Association	Madhubani	
21	Munger District Football Association	Munger	
22	Madhepura District Football Association	Madhepura	
23	Muzaffarpur District Football Association	Muzaffarpur	
24	Nalanda District Football Association	Nalanda	
25	Nawada District Football Association	Nawada	
26	Patna District Football Association	Patna	
27	Purnia District Football Association	Purnia	
28	Rohtas District Football Association	Rohtas	President Shri Jitendra Singh Secretary Surendra Kumar  Deputy Secretary Rahul Singh
29	Saharsa District Football Association	Saharsa	
30	Samastipur District Football Association	Samastipur	
31	Sheohar District Football Association	Sheohar	
32	Sheikhpura District Football Association	Sheikhpura	
33	Saran District Football Association	Saran	
34	Sitamarhi District Football Association	Sitamarhi	
35	Supaul District Football Association	Supaul	
36	Siwan District Football Association	Siwan	
37	Vaishali District Football Association	Vaishali	
38	West Champaran District Football Association	West Champaran	

== Competitions ==
=== Club level ===
==== Men's ====
- Bihar State Soccer League
- Moin-ul-Haq Cup
- All India Chaturbhuj Cup

==== Women's ====
- Bihar State Women's League

== See also ==
- List of Indian state football associations
- Football in India
