= JSW Youth Cup =

- Organiser(s): Bengaluru FC
- Founded: 2022; 4 years ago
- Region: India
- Teams: 5
- Current champions: Punjab (U-18); Sudeva Delhi (U-13)
- Most championships: Punjab (U-18); Sudeva Delhi (U-13)

JSW Youth Cup (named after sponsor JSW Group) is an Indian youth football tournament for residential academies held in Bellary and organised by Bengaluru FC annually. The tournament was first started in 2022.

Bengaluru FC had announced that the 1st edition of the JSW Youth Cup football tournament was going to be held from third week of March.

== Winners ==
List of JSW Youth Cup Finals (U-18)
Year	Winners	Score	Runners-up	Ref.
2022	RoundGlass Punjab FC	2–1	Reliance Foundation Young Champs	

List of JSW Youth Cup Finals (U-15)
Year	Winners	Score	Runners-up	Ref.
2022	RoundGlass Punjab FC	2–1	Sports Odisha	

List of JSW Youth Cup Finals (U-13)
Year	Winners	Score	Runners-up	Ref.
2022	Sudeva Delhi FC	1–1 (4–3 p)	RoundGlass Punjab FC	
