= Vatika FC =

Indian association football club based in Gurgaon

- Full name: Vatika Football Club
- Short name: VFC
- Founded: 2018; 8 years ago
- Ground: Vatika Sports Complex
- Capacity: 5,000
- Owner: Saurav Baisoya; Kushagra Srivastava
- League: Delhi Premier League
Home colours	Away colours

Vatika Football Club is an Indian professional football club based in Gurgaon, Haryana. The club currently competed in the I-League 3, the 4th tier of the Indian football league system, and currently in the Delhi Premier League.

== Honours ==
Delhi Premier League: Champions (1): 2023

== See also ==
- List of football clubs in India
- Dominence of Haryana in sports
