= Shirsh Bihar United FC =

Indian association football club based in Mujaffarpur

Shirsh Bihar United
- Full name: Shirsh Bihar United Football Club
- Short name: SBUFC
- Founded: 2017; 8 years ago
- Ground: Khudiram Bose Stadium
- Capacity: 3,000
- League: Bihar State Soccer League
Home colours	Away colours

Shirsh Bihar United Football Club is an Indian professional football club from Muzaffarpur, Bihar. It currently participates in Bihar State Soccer League.

== History ==
Shirsh Bihar United FC was first nominated for I-League 2nd division in 2018, but did not participate in the league because they had not completed one year.

On 20 October 2019, Bihar United played their last league match of District football league Motihari and became champions of A division.

Shirsh Bihar also participated in International tournaments such as Dana Cup in Denmark and Barcelona Summer Cup in Spain.

Bihar United women's team won the first edition of Bihar State Women's League and qualified for the Indian Women's League. which was held in Muzaffarpur

Shirsh Bihar was nominated for the 2021–22 I-League 2nd Division.

== Stadium ==
Shirsh Bihar United play their home matches at the Khudiram Bose Stadium in Muzaffarpur.

For women's league matches, SBU uses Moin-ul-Haq Stadium.

== Players ==
Note: Flags indicate national team as defined under FIFA eligibility rules; some limited exceptions apply. Players may hold more than one non-FIFA nationality.

No.	Pos.	Nation	Player
2	DF	(India) IND	Vivek Kumar Singh
3	DF	(India) IND	Saurabh Kumar
4	DF	(India) IND	Salauddin Middya
5	DF	(India) IND	Jiran Ali Ansari
6	MF	(India) IND	Ankit Kumar
7	MF	(India) IND	Shubhankar Dey
8	FW	(India) IND	Raphael Soren
9	FW	(India) IND	Roushan Kumar
—	FW	(India) IND	MD Sarfaraz

No.	Pos.	Nation	Player
11	FW	(India) IND	Arif Khan
12	DF	(India) IND	MD Musharraf Perwez
14	MF	(India) IND	Abuzar Mohamed
15	MF	(India) IND	Guman Shrestha
—	MF	(India) IND	Avinash Paswan
—		(India) IND	Guddu Kumar
—		(India) IND	Rajan Kumar
—		(India) IND	Jawed Ali Khan
—		(India) IND	Raj Gupta
—		(India) IND	Nuneshwar Murmu

== Personnel ==
Current technical staff (as of 5 August 2021)
Position	Name
Owner	(India) Alapana Sinha
CFO	(India) Sunil Kumar Verma
Team manager	(India) Amit Sinha
Head coach	Vacant
Scouting director	(India) Anand Pal

== Honours ==
=== Leagues ===
- Bihar Soccer League
  - Champion(1): 2021
- East Champaran district league
  - Champions (3): 2018, 2019, 2020

=== Women's team ===
- Bihar State Women's League
  - Champions (1): 2021

=== Cups ===
- Chaturbhuj Cup
  - Runner-up (1): 2018
- Monsoon Football Cup
  - Champions (1): 2021

== Affiliated clubs ==
The following club is currently affiliated with Shirsh Bihar United:

- (Canada) Montreal Manic FC (2020–present)

== See also ==
- Bihar Football Association
