= Simla Youngs FC =

Former Indian association football club

Simla Youngs
- Full name: Simla Youngs Football Club
- Nickname(s): The Youngs
- Short name: SYFC
- Founded: 1936; 89 years ago
- Ground: Ambedkar Stadium
- Capacity: 35,000
- League: FD A Division League

Simla Youngs Football Club is an Indian football club from New Delhi, India. Formed in 1936, it has been an amateur team, but in January 2011 they participated in the 2nd Division, then second tier of Indian football league system. They also competed in the DSA Senior Division.

== History ==
Simla Youngs FC was founded in 1936 in Simla part of Delhi, and have since participated in various amateur tournaments.

In January 2011, they were officially certified by the All India Football Federation to participate in the I-League 2nd Division, then second tier of football in India. They later roped in Japanese manager Michiteru Mita as their new head coach.

== Honours ==
=== League ===
- Delhi Football League
  - Champions (6): 1950, 1952, 1972, 1973, 1976, 2005
  - Runner-up (3): 1985, 1991, 1993

=== Cup ===
- Lal Bahadur Shastri Cup
  - Champions (2): 1979, 1985
- Delhi Lt. Governor's Cup
  - Champions (1): 2003

== See also ==
- List of football clubs in Delhi
