= New Delhi Heroes FC =

Indian association football club

New Delhi Heroes
- Full name: New Delhi Heroes Football Club
- Nickname(s): The Heroes
- Founded: 1939; 86 years ago
- Ground: Ambedkar Stadium; Jawaharlal Nehru Stadium
- Capacity: 35,000; 60,254
- Owner: IOS Sports and Entertainment
Home colours	Away colours

New Delhi Heroes FC is an Indian professional football club based in New Delhi, that competes in the B-Division League.

== History ==
New Delhi Heroes, Delhi's most successful club, was formed in 1939. The founders opted for green and yellow colours, which soon became a force to reckon within football fields of Delhi. In a time span of just fifteen years they became one of the most formidable teams of North India, winning several prestigious tournaments and producing talented players who have become legends in local football. In 1945 they won the inaugural DCM Football tournament at the Talkatora grounds, overcoming a formidable British regimental team, King's Own Yorkshire Light Infantry (KOYLI) 3–2 in a hard-fought match. KOYLI had two players who were war time internationals for England.

In the 1950s, an exciting new crop of players emerged to play for ND Heroes and they became supreme team in the capital. They won the Delhi Football Association league four consecutive seasons (1953 to 1956). Later they were champions again in 1958 and 1959. After their success in 1954, ND Heroes were sent on Afghan independence celebration in Kabul, and also played Jinnah tournament in Karachi. During this decade they took part in all major national tournaments: IFA Shield, Calcutta Rovers Cup in Bombay, DCM and Durand tournaments in Delhi.

Following the success of 119th Osian's Durand Cup in October–November 2006, IOS Sports and Entertainment, India's leading sports and entertainment management company, took over the club in May 2007. ND Heroes won the 2007 Delhi League title, representing the state in I-League 2nd Division.

== Honours ==
=== League ===
- Delhi Football League
  - Champions (7): 1953, 1954, 1955, 1956, 1958, 1959, 2007–08

=== Cup ===
- DCM Trophy
  - Champions (1): 1945
- Lal Bahadur Shastri Cup
  - Champions (1): 1980
