= Garhwal Heroes FC =

Indian association football club based in Delhi

Garhwal Heroes
- Full name: Garhwal Heroes Football Club
- Nickname: Garhwalis
- Short name: GHFC
- Founded: 1953; 73 years ago (as Garhwal Heroes Football Club)
- Ground: Ambedkar Stadium; Jawaharlal Nehru Stadium
- Capacity: 35,000; 60,254
- Owner: Bhagwan Singh Negi
- League: Delhi Premier League; I-League 3
Home colours	Away colours

Garhwal Heroes Football Club (also known as Garhwal Football Club) is an Indian professional football club based in New Delhi. The club lifted its first FD Senior Division league title in 1986, which became one of the most successful seasons in their history. In 2010, Garhwal FC became the first Delhi based club to enter into the quarter final of Durand Cup, prestigious and oldest knockout football club tournament in India. They also competed in the I-League 2nd Division.

== History ==
=== Foundation ===
Garhwal Heroes FC was initially set up by Kesar Singh Negi as a platform for young players of the Garhwali community to compete locally in Delhi. As the club gained popularity, it was formally registered with the Football Delhi (formerly Delhi Soccer Association) in 1953. Since then, GHFC has regularly featured in the league championship organized by the Football Delhi (FD). One of the most memorable moments came in 1986, when GHFC were crowned the champions of the FD Senior Division. Unfortunately, the one and a half decades following the historic triumph saw GHFC beset by financial problems which resulted in the club being relegated to the A Division and then the B Division of the Delhi League. The club got a fresh lease of life when it was taken over by B. S. Negi and M. S. Patwal in 2001 following which the club gradually started its ascent once more. From the nadir of the B Division, the club gained promotion to A Division and then to the Senior Division in 2005. GHFC won the FD Senior Division League once more in 2012–13.

=== Garhwal FC era (2013–present) ===
In 2013, GHFC also won the Delhi leg of the Manchester United Premier Cup, which is a nationwide U-16 club competition. As GHFC tries to attain sustainability of its operations, the partnership will strengthen the club's youth development and scouting network.

In 2013, GHFC was rechristened as Garhwal Football Club (GFC) in order to fulfill the AFC Club Licensing Criteria laid down by the All India Football Federation (AIFF) – a step that would enable GFC to compete in the I-League – the highest level of professional football in the country. GFC brought about a major restructuring drive that would make it a complete club ready for the next generation. In addition to becoming an independent commercial entity as mandated by AIFF, GFC also set up a highly organized youth development system and a professional management team. They provide a pathway for player development to Bhaichung Bhutia Football Schools. BBFS players will be able to further their football development by playing professionally. GFC finished runners up in All India Football Tournament in Pithoragarh, Uttarakhand.

In July 2021, Garhwal FC participated in the Delhi 2nd Division Qualifiers and moved through knockout stages from group A. In August 2023, the club earned an I-League 3 spot to compete in the inaugural edition.

== Competitive seasons ==
2020 was Garhwal's one of the successful seasons when the club finished top of the 2019–20 2nd Division League Group A preliminary round and entered into the 2020 I-League Qualifiers, where they finished at the bottom.

== Achievements ==
Apart from being champions of the Delhi League, other notable achievements in the past include winning the Delhi Women's League in 2011 and reaching the quarterfinals of the prestigious Durand Cup in 2010, beating the likes of Sporting Clube de Goa and JCT in the process.

== Tradition ==
Historically, the Garhwal Kingdom in the Garhwal Himalayas was established by King Kanak Pal by integrating the 52 forts or "Garhs" in the region at a time when these forts were owned by several warring chieftains. This helped the kingdom to unite and flourish despite the hardships posed by the unforgiving terrain and extreme weather conditions. Unity and bravery of the Garhwalis were also instrumental in helping the Kingdom to withstand multiple invasions – firstly from the Mughals and then from the Gorkhas. These values of fighting against all odds to survive and succeed formed the basis of the club's philosophy when it was set up. Thus, Unity, Bravery, Victory (Ekta, Shaurya, Vijay) became the guiding principles of the club. The goal of the club is to promote community welfare by achieving sporting success in the field of football on the basis these principles.

Since its inception, GFC has always been a community-oriented club with most of its roster being local players. It enjoys support both within Delhi and Uttarakhand with over 5000 fans celebrating its victory in the Delhi League in 2012–13.

== Club management ==
Role	Name
Honorary president	(India) Bhagwan Singh Negi
Treasurer	(India) Magan Singh Negi
Director	(India) Kishor Gam Taid
Assistant director	(India) Anurag Khilnani
Honorary vice president	(India) Sukhpal Singh Negi
Honorary secretary	(India) Anil Kumar Negi

== Youth team ==
Garhwal FC's U17 team competes in various regional and national youth tournaments, as well as Hero Youth League.

== Honours ==
=== Domestic ===
Senior

- Delhi Premier League/Delhi Senior Division
  - Champions (4): 1986, 2012–13, 2018–19, 2023–24
  - Runners-up (2): 1990, 2010
- Lal Bahadur Shastri Cup
  - Champions (1): 1980
  - Runners-up (2): 1983, 2006
- Mohan Kumar Mangalam Football Tournament
  - Champions (1): 1988
- Shaheed Bhagat Singh Memorial Cup
  - Champions (1): 2022–23

Youth

- FD U-18 Youth League
  - Third place (1): 2022–23

== See also ==
- Garhwal United FC
- List of football clubs in India
- Sport in Delhi
