= Delhi FC =

Indian association football club

Delhi
- Full name: Delhi Football Club
- Nickname: The Warriors
- Short name: DFC
- Founded: 1994; 32 years ago
- Ground: Ambedkar Stadium; Minerva Academy Ground
- Capacity: 35,000
- Owner: Ranjit Bajaj
- Head coach: Lobzang Dorji
- League: Delhi Premier League
- Website: delhifootballclub.com
| Home colours | Away colours | Third colours |

Delhi Football Club is an Indian professional football club founded in 1994 in Delhi. The club last competed in the Delhi Premier League. The club debuted in the 2023–24 I-League, the second tier of Indian football, following promotion from the 2022–23 I-League 2. Their supporters are called The Warrior Ultras.

== History ==
Delhi FC was founded in 1994 and competed in lower local divisions until 2009, when it was promoted to the FD Senior Division. Affiliated with Football Delhi, the club is regularly participating in the top division of the Delhi Football League system, the Delhi Premier League.

In August 2020, Minerva Academy owner Ranjit Bajaj took over Delhi FC after selling Punjab FC to RoundGlass completely. Delhi FC participated in the 130th edition of the Durand Cup and reached the quarter-finals, after beating the ISL side Kerala Blasters in their final group match.

In May 2023, Delhi FC clinched its first I-League 2 title and gained promotion to the I-League, becoming the first club from Delhi to achieve it on sporting merit. The club appointed Yan Law as head coach for their debut I-League season. In September 2023, the club took part in the inaugural edition of the Climate Cup in Ladakh, in which they clinched title, defeating Tibetan National Sports Association 6–0 in the final. The club got relegated to the I-League 2 in April 2025, but won it the next season. However, their spot was taken by Samaleswari SC.

== Stadium ==
Ambedkar Stadium, located in New Delhi, is the home ground of Delhi FC for the DPL. The club also plays some matches at Jawaharlal Nehru Stadium or Chhatrasal Stadium. However, the club played the home matches of their inaugural I-League season at Namdhari Stadium in Punjab.

They named Mahilpur Football Stadium (Coach Ali Hasan Stadium) as home ground for the second I-League season.

== Kit manufacturers and shirt sponsors ==
| Period | Kit manufacturer | Shirt sponsor |
|---|---|---|
| 2021—2023 | Spartan | — |
| 2023 | Astro | Colordesign India |
| 2023—2024 | Nivia Sports | Forza Football |
| 2024—2026 | King Sports | PSSC |
| 2026— | Masita | — |

== Players ==
As of April 2026

Note: Flags indicate national team as defined under FIFA eligibility rules; some limited exceptions apply. Players may hold more than one non-FIFA nationality.

| No. | Pos. | Nation | Player |
|---|---|---|---|
| 2 | DF | IND | Dhanajit Ashangbam |
| 4 | DF | IND | Kartik |
| 5 | DF | IND | TN Lunminthang Haokip |
| 10 | MF | IND | Samson Keishing |
| 11 | FW | IND | Himanshu Jangra (captain) |
| 13 | GK | IND | Lalmuansanga |
| 14 | MF | IND | Hemneichung Lunkim |
| 15 | DF | IND | Keisham Sanathoi Meetei |
| 17 | FW | IND | Arjun Singh Gautam |
| 19 | FW | IND | Ayaan Shakeel |
| 21 | FW | IND | Arjun Amist |
| 26 | FW | IND | Seiminthang Khongsai |

| No. | Pos. | Nation | Player |
|---|---|---|---|
| 27 | MF | IND | Priyanshu |
| 30 | FW | IND | Thongkhongmayum Naoba |
| 31 | FW | IND | Aditya Sindhi |
| 32 | DF | IND | Nirbhay Singh |
| 37 | DF | IND | Neeraj Bhandari |
| 55 | MF | IND | Akash Tirkey |
| 74 | MF | IND | Tuanlal Tonsing |
| 90 | FW | IND | Suhel Khan |
| 93 | DF | IND | Amritpal Singh |
| 96 | FW | IND | Rohit Rawat |
| 99 | GK | IND | Gojen Hanse |

== Statistics and records ==
=== Seasons ===
| Season | League | | | | | | | | | |
| Season | League | Level | P | W | D | L | GF | GA | Points | Position |
|---|---|---|---|---|---|---|---|---|---|---|
| 2021 | Delhi 2nd Division Qualifiers | III | 6 | 4 | 1 | 1 | 25 | 9 | 10 | 2nd ▲ |
| 2021 | I-League Qualifiers | II | 7 | 5 | 1 | 1 | 18 | 4 | 16 | 3rd ▼ |
| 2021–22 | FD Senior Division | III | 16 | 13 | 1 | 2 | 62 | 11 | 40 | 1st |
| 2022–23 | Delhi Premier League | IV | 20 | 12 | 3 | 5 | 47 | 28 | 39 | 2nd ▲ |
| 2022–23 | I-League 2 | III | 12 | 7 | 2 | 3 | 26 | 9 | 23 | 1st ▲ |
| 2023–24 | I-League | II | 24 | 11 | 2 | 11 | 44 | 40 | 35 | 6th |
| 2024–25 | I-League | II | 22 | 3 | 5 | 14 | 21 | 44 | 14 | 12th ▼ |
| 2025–26 | I-League 2 | III | 8 | 5 | 2 | 1 | 20 | 10 | 17 | 1st ▲ |

== Honours ==
=== Football ===
==== Domestic leagues ====
- I-League 2nd Division/I-League 2
  - Champions (2): 2022–23, 2025–26
  - Third place (1): 2021
- FD Senior Division/Delhi Premier League
  - Champions (1): 2021–22
  - Runners-up (1): 2022–23
  - Runners-up (1): 2021 (Delhi 2nd Division Qualifiers)
- DSA A Division
  - Runners-up (1): 2009
- DSA B Division
  - Champions (1): 2001

==== Domestic cups ====
- Bordoloi Trophy
  - Champions (1): 2022
- Climate Cup
  - Champions (1): 2023
- Principal Harbhajan Singh Memorial Tournament
  - Champions (1): 2022
- Shandar Football Tournament
  - Champions (1): 2021
- Shaheed Bhagat Singh Cup
  - Champions (1): 2022
- Chakradhar Deka Memorial Cup
  - Champions (1): 2022
- All Open Football Tournament
  - Champions (1): 2022

=== Futsal ===
- Futsal Club Championship
  - Champions (1): 2021–22
- Football Delhi Futsal League
  - Champions (1): 2021

== Affiliated clubs ==
The following clubs are currently affiliated with Delhi FC:

- (India) Minerva Academy FC (2020–present)
- (India) Techtro Lucknow FC (2020–present)
- (India) Techtro Swades United FC (2020–present)

== Futsal ==
The club's futsal team takes part in the Delhi Futsal League, and won the 2021 edition. They also won the inaugural edition of the AIFF Futsal Club Championship, becoming the first Indian team to qualify for AFC Futsal Club Championship, which was eventually cancelled.
