= Indian Air Force football team =

Indian Air Force
- Full name: Indian Air Force football team
- Short name: IAFFT
- Ground: Ambedkar Stadium; Jawaharlal Nehru Stadium
- Capacity: 35,000; 60,254
- Owner(s): Services Sports Control Board; Indian Air Force
- Head coach: Priya Darshan
- League: Delhi Premier League
Home colours	Away colours

Indian Air Force Sports, also known as Indian Air Force football team, serves as a football section of the Indian Air Force, New Delhi. The team regularly participates in the Delhi Premier League and the Durand Cup. The team is affiliated with Football Delhi.

== Honours ==
=== Association football ===
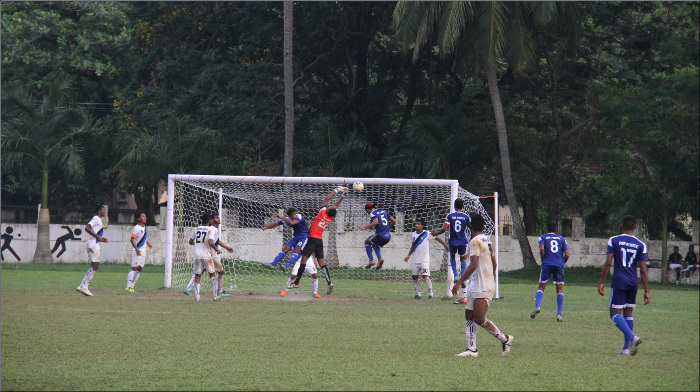
Indian Navy beat Indian Air Force (3–0) in a keenly contested finals of the 68th Inter Services Football Championship 2016–17 conducted at the Naval Base, Kochi. Rear Admiral R J Nadkarni, VSM, Chief of Staff, Southern Naval Command, chief guest presented the Services Football Trophy for the Year 2016–17 to the Indian Navy Team and gave away the medals to the team members of the winners and runners-up.

- FD Senior Division/Delhi Premier League
  - Champions (8): 1971, 1975, 1998, 2002, 2003, 2006–07, 2018, 2021
  - Runners-up (3): 1997, 2004, 2019
- Durand Cup
  - Runners-up (1): 1955
- DCM Trophy
  - Champions (1): 1955, 1956
- Lal Bahadur Shastri Cup
  - Champions (2): 1983, 2006
  - Runners-up (1): 1981
- Mohan Kumar Mangalam Football Tournament
  - Champions (1): 2005
  - Runners-up (1): 2020
- Ashish Jabbar Memorial Cup
  - Runners-up (1): 1982
- Inter Services Football Championship
  - Runners-up (1): 2016–17

=== Field hockey ===
- Aga Khan Gold Cup
  - Runners-up (1): 1958

== See also ==
- List of football clubs in India
- Army Red
- Army Green
- Indian Navy
- Services football team
- Railways football team
- Assam Rifles
- Central Reserve Police Force SC
- CISF Protectors football team
- Indian Army Service Corps
