= Delhi Football League =

Indian football league in the union territory of Delhi

- Organising bodies: Delhi Soccer Association
- Founded: 1948; 78 years ago
- Country: India
- Leagues: Delhi Premier League; Senior Division League; A-Division League; B-Division League; C-Division League
- Divisions: 5
- Number of clubs: 80+ (overall)
- Level on pyramid: 5–9
- Promotion to: Various
- Relegation to: Various
- Website: www.footballdelhi.com

The Delhi Football League is a ladder-based football competition in the Indian union territory of Delhi, organised by the Delhi Soccer Association (DSA) as part of the state leagues. Delhi Premier League is the top division, started in 1948 as the DSA Senior Division.

== History ==
The first parent body of Delhi football was formed in 1926, with professor Mohammed Zubair Qureishi as secretary. There was no proper local league but the clubs used to participate in private tournaments organised by sport enthusiasts. Due to the violence and upheaval caused by the Partition of India, the Delhi League was suspended after 1946. It resumed in 1948 and the oldest club in the capital Young Men has won it that year. From 1948 onwards, the Delhi League took a particular shape. It had three divisions. The top 10 teams played in the A division, on a double-leg basis, with all matches being held at the Ambedkar Stadium, earlier known as the Delhi Gate Stadium. The B and C division matches took place at either the nearby Crescent Ground or the President's Estate Ground. Except for transport allowance, kit and refreshment, there was no payment to the players. However, club officials would strive to get their top players jobs in leading public sector concerns like Delhi Audit, Northern Railway, State Bank of India, Central Secretariat Service, Delhi Electric Supply Undertaking (DESU), Food Corporation of India (FCI) and so on. A competitive institutional league was also held annually.

== Structure ==
Delhi Football League
Tier	Division
1 _{(5 on Indian football pyramid)}	Delhi Premier League _{↑promote (to I-League 3) ↓relegate}
2 _{(6 on Indian football pyramid)}	DSA Senior Division League _{↑promote ↓relegate}
3 _{(7 on Indian football Football pyramid)}	DSA A-Division League _{↑promote↓relegate}
4 _{(8 on Indian football Football pyramid)}	DSA B-Division League _{↑promote↓relegate}
5 _{(9 on Indian football pyramid)}	DSA C-Division League _{↑promote}

== Delhi Premier League ==
Delhi Premier League
- Organising bodies: Delhi Soccer Association
- Founded: 2022; 4 years ago
- Country: India
- Number of clubs: 14
- Level on pyramid: 5
- Promotion to: I-League 3
- Relegation to: FD Senior Division League
- Current champions: Garhwal Heroes FC (1st title)
- Current: 2025–26 Delhi Premier League

Delhi Premier League, previously known as Football Delhi Senior Division League (FD Senior Division) and DSA Senior Division, is the top state-level football league in Delhi and level 5 of Indian football league system. It is also the highest level inter-city league played in the capital. Competition is conducted by Delhi Soccer Association, official governing body of Delhi region under AIFF. Most players from this league are selected to represent Delhi for Santosh Trophy.

=== Clubs ===
Eleven clubs competed in the first edition.

Clubs	Venues
Delhi FC	Ambedkar Stadium Jawaharlal Nehru Stadium
Hindustan FC	Ambedkar Stadium Jawaharlal Nehru Stadium
Royal Rangers FC	Ambedkar Stadium Jawaharlal Nehru Stadium
Friends United FC	Ambedkar Stadium Jawaharlal Nehru Stadium
Garhwal Heroes FC	Ambedkar Stadium Jawaharlal Nehru Stadium
Tarun Sangha FC	Ambedkar Stadium Jawaharlal Nehru Stadium
Rangers SC	Ambedkar Stadium Jawaharlal Nehru Stadium
Sudeva Delhi FC	Ambedkar Stadium Jawaharlal Nehru Stadium
Uttarakhand FC	Ambedkar Stadium Jawaharlal Nehru Stadium
Amity Indian National FC	Ambedkar Stadium Jawaharlal Nehru Stadium
Indian Air Force	Ambedkar Stadium Jawaharlal Nehru Stadium
Vatika FC	Ambedkar Stadium Jawaharlal Nehru Stadium

=== Champions ===
Season	Champions	Runners-up	Note
2022–23	Vatika	Delhi	
2023–24	Garhwal Heroes	Royal Rangers	
2024–25	CISF Protectors	Garhwal Heroes	

== Delhi Senior Division League ==
Delhi Senior Division League
- Organising bodies: Delhi Soccer Association
- Country: India
- Number of clubs: 14
- Level on pyramid: 6
- Promotion to: Delhi Premier League
- Relegation to: DSA A-Division League
- Current champions: Noida City FC
- Current: 2025 DSA Senior Division

Delhi Senior Division League is the second tier of Delhi Football League system.

Clubs	Venues
Ahbab FC	Ambedkar Stadium
M2M FC	Ambedkar Stadium
Rangers SC	Ambedkar Stadium
United Bharat FC	Ambedkar Stadium
Warriors FC	Ambedkar Stadium
Young Boys FC	Ambedkar Stadium
Jaguar FC	Ambedkar Stadium
Ajmal FC	Ambedkar Stadium
Garhwal United FC	Ambedkar Stadium
Juba Sangha FC	Ambedkar Stadium
Indian Air Force	Ambedkar Stadium
Frontier FC	Ambedkar Stadium
The Dream Team	

=== Champions ===
Season	Champions	Runners-up	Note
2024–25	Noida City FC	-	
2025–26	Juba Sangha FC	Indian Air Force	

== Delhi A-Division League ==
Delhi A-Division League
- Organising bodies: Delhi Soccer Association
- Country: India
- Level on pyramid: 7
- Promotion to: DSA Senior Division League
- Relegation to: DSA B-Division League

Delhi A-Division League is the third tier of Delhi Football League system.

== Delhi B-Division League ==
Delhi B-Division League
- Organising bodies: Delhi Soccer Association
- Country: India
- Level on pyramid: 8
- Promotion to: DSA A-Division League
- Relegation to: DSA C-Division League

Delhi B-Division League is the fourth tier of Delhi Football League system.

== Delhi C-Division League ==
Delhi C-Division League
- Organising bodies: Delhi Soccer Association
- Country: India
- Number of clubs: 11
- Level on pyramid: 9
- Promotion to: DSA B-Division League

Delhi C-Division League is the fifth tier of Delhi Football League system.

== Champions of the top-most division ==
The Delhi League was started in 1948, but has not been finished on some occasions. From 1985, a new format, Super League (two groups followed by knock-out semifinals and final), was adopted.

Year	Winner	Runners-up	Note
1948	Youngmen SC	Data not available	
1949	Raisina Sporting	Data not available	
1950	Simla Youngs	Data not available	
1951	Youngmen SC	Data not available	
1952	Simla Youngs	Data not available	
1953	New Delhi Heroes	Data not available	
1954	New Delhi Heroes	Data not available	
1955	New Delhi Heroes	Data not available	
1956	New Delhi Heroes	Data not available	
1957	Youngmen SC	Data not available	
1958	New Delhi Heroes	Data not available	
1959	New Delhi Heroes	Data not available	
1960	City Club	Data not available	
1961	Raisina Sporting	Data not available	
1962	Raisina Sporting	Data not available	
1963	City Club	Data not available	
1964	City Club	Data not available	
1965	Youngmen SC	Data not available	
1966	President's Estate	Data not available	
1967	President's Estate	Data not available	
1969	Youngmen SC	Data not available	
1971	Indian Air Force	Data not available	
1972	Simla Youngs	Data not available	
1973	Simla Youngs	Data not available	
1975	Indian Air Force	Data not available	
1976	Simla Youngs	Data not available	
1985	Moonlight FC	Simla Youngs	
1986	Garhwal Heroes	Youngsters FC	
1987	None		Unfinished
1988	Shastri FC and Moonlight FC		Joint winners
1989	Shastri FC and Moonlight FC		Joint winners
1990	Moonlight FC		
1991	Students Club	Simla Youngs	
1992	Shastri FC	Special Area Games	
1993	South India FC	Simla Youngs	
1994	Shastri FC	Indian National FC	
1995	Mughals SC	Shastri FC	
1996	Shastri FC	Hindustan	
1997	City Club	Indian Air Force	
1998	Indian Air Force	Hindustan	
1999	Indian National FC	Shastri FC	
2000	Indian National FC	Hindustan	
2001–02	Hindustan	Indian National FC	
2002	Indian Air Force	Hindustan	
2003	Indian Air Force	Tarun Sangha FC	
2004	Indian Air Force	Indian Air Force	
2005	Simla Youngs	Hindustan	
2006–07	Indian Air Force	Indian National FC	
2007–08	New Delhi Heroes	Indian National FC	
2008–09	Indian National FC	Hindustan	
2009	Hindustan and Indian National FC		Joint winners
2011–12	Delhi United	Shahadra FC	
2013	Garhwal Heroes	Goodwill FC	
2013–14	Indian National FC	Garhwal Heroes	
2018	Indian Air Force		
2019	Garhwal Heroes	Indian Air Force	
2020	Not held		due to COVID-19 pandemic
2021	Indian Air Force	Delhi	
2021–22	Delhi	Hindustan	
2022–23	Vatika FC	Delhi	
2023–24	Garhwal Heroes	Royal Rangers FC	
2024–25	CISF Protectors	Garhwal Heroes	

== See also ==
- Delhi Soccer Association
- SC Delhi
