= Sudeva Delhi FC =

Indian association football club based in Delhi

Sudeva Delhi
- Full name: Sudeva Delhi Football Club
- Short name: SDFC
- Founded: 2014; 12 years ago (as Sudeva Moonlight FC)
- Ground: Ambedkar Stadium; Chhatrasal Stadium; Sudeva Academy Ground
- Capacity: 35,000; 16,000
- Owner(s): Anuj Gupta; Vijay Hakari
- Head coach: Zahid Shafi Mir
- League: I-League 2
- Website: www.sudeva.co.in
Home colours	Away colours	Third colours

Sudeva Delhi Football Club is an Indian professional football club based in Delhi. The club competes in the I-League 2, the third tier of the Indian football league system, after getting relegated from the second-tier I-League in 2022–23. Its reverves have competed in the Delhi Premier League.

Founded as Sudeva Moonlight FC in 2014, and affiliated with Football Delhi (FD). They joined I-League in 2020–21 season and became the first club from the capital city to do so. Paul Williams, local English publican, has brought a 20% stake in the club.

== History ==
=== The beginning ===
Sudeva as a sporting organization, was incorporated in 2014 in Delhi by two young entrepreneurs, Anuj Gupta, a solicitor in England and Vijay Hakari, an environmentalist, sharing a common passion for raising the standards of football training in the country. The organization runs grassroots programs for potential talent, starting from the age of 9, right up to the senior level.

=== As Sudeva Moonlight ===
In 2016, Sudeva acquired "Moonlight Football Club", a Delhi-based club that appeared in DSA Senior Division (now known as Football Delhi Senior Division League) and DCM Trophy, having clinched league title twice in 1985 and 1990 (alongside runner-up finishes in 1988 and 1999). The club had submitted its bid in 2016 to center into the I-League, but it eventually failed through. Sudeva Moonlight debuted in I-League 2nd Division during the 2016–17 season, and appointed Carlton Chapman as head coach. In 2018, Sudeva acquired Sudeva Olimpic Residential Academy, a club that currently competes in the Spanish Tercera Division, and became the first club in the history of Indian football to acquire a European club.

In 2018, they participated in J&K Invitational Cup in Srinagar. In that edition, they ended their campaign reaching semi-finals.

=== As Sudeva Delhi ===
In June 2020, All India Football Federation (AIFF) invited bids for a new team to join the I-League. Sudeva was one of three football clubs that submitted the bid documents and on August 12, 2020, AIFF announced that Sudeva would take part in the 2020–21 I-League season, after winning the bid for direct entry. Thus the club became first Delhi-based team to compete in the I-League.

Sudeva Delhi was launched by Delhi Deputy Chief Minister Manish Sisodia on November 27, 2020. Ahead of the 2020–21 I-League season, Sudeva Delhi appointed Chencho Dorji as their head coach. Dorji is the first Bhutanese coach at the helm of any club in the history of the I-League.

It is a great honour to be part of the I-League. I really thank the president and the vice-president for believing in me and deciding to give the huge responsibility. lf you do well, you will survive and I am very excited about this challenge. As with every head coach, I also want to win. l want to win all the matches, but that does not happen in football.

— Chencho Dorji, the head coach of Sudeva Delhi.

The first club from the national capital to play in the I-League, Sudeva Delhi FC have opted for an all-Indian squad in their first season and the concept was supported by coach Dorji: "The message was always clear that we will go with an all-Indian squad". The club began their very first top flight competitive season on 9 January with a match against Mohammedan Sporting, which ended as their 1–0 loss. After struggling in lots of matches, they managed to win against teams like Chennai City, NEROCA and Indian Arrows. They managed to get 18 points from 14 games, which includes five wins, six losses and there draws and finished in eighth position of the league table. In 2021, club's youth prodigy Shubho Paul was roped in as one of the fifteen global youth players by the German giant FC Bayern Munich's world squad and their U19 team.

Sudeva began their 2021–22 season with 2021 Durand Cup in Kolkata, and bowed out of the tournament from group stages. In 2021–22 I-League, after moving to relegation stage, the club ended their campaign in eleventh position. In January 2022, Sudeva Delhi entered into a strategic partnership under the name of "Bellmare Asia Football Alliance", with Japanese J1 League club Shonan Bellmare. After Dorji's departure, the club was managed by Mehrajuddin Wadoo till September 2022. In September 2022, the club roped in Japanese manager Atsushi Nakamura as new head coach, who was replaced in the mid-season by Sankarlal Chakraborty. The club struggled a lot in 2022–23 season, and relegated from I-League, alongside Kenkre. Until August, Chakraborty managed Sudeva.

In the 2023–24 I-League 2, Sudeva Delhi ended their campaign achieving third place with 23 points, 8 wins in 14 matches, missing the opportunity to secure promotion in the 2024–25 I-League. In November 2024, the club took part in the 2024 edition of Sikkim Gold Cup, in which they bowed out facing a penalty shoot-out defeat to local side Gangtok Himalayan in pre-quarterfinals. In October 2024, the club withdrew from the 2024–25 I-League 2. In 2024, the club entered into a strategic partnership with Bundesliga club VfB Stuttgart focusing on youth development.

== Kit manufacturers and shirt sponsors ==
Period	Kit manufacturer	Shirt sponsor
2016–2017	N/A	Chevrolet
2017–2020	T10 Sports	Sudeva
2020–2021	Puma	Liquid Water
2021–2022	Hummel	Liquid Water
2022–2024	Shiv-Naresh	Liquid Water
2024–Present	Shiv-Naresh	Aditya Birla Group; MakeMyTrip; Hindalco Industries

== Stadium ==
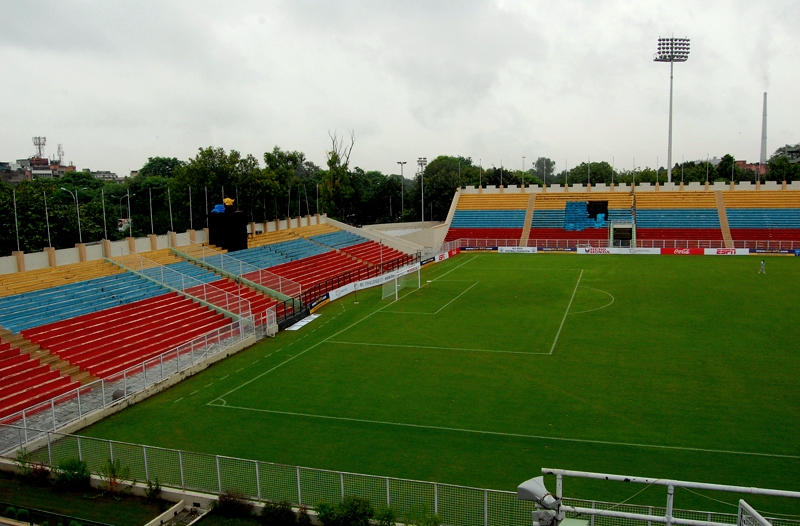
The Ambedkar Stadium, New Delhi

Ambedkar Stadium, located in Delhi, is the home ground of Sudeva Delhi. Since 2022, the club also plays some of their home matches of I-League at Chhatrasal Stadium.

In previous editions of I-League, due to COVID-19 pandemic in India, played league games in centralized venues in West Bengal. In 2023–24 I-League 2, the club used Ambedkar Stadium. In the 2026 I-League 2, the team used the Sudeva Residential Academy Ground as its home venue.

== Personnel ==
=== Current technical staff ===
Position	Name
Head coach	(India) Zahid Shafi Mir
Goalkeeping coach	(India) Sandip Dhole
Team manager	(India) Ravi Hooda
Physiotherapists	(India) Soumya Purkhait (India) Chirag Sharma
Head coach U17	(India) Uttam Singh
Head coach U15	(India) Deepak Deswal

== Managerial record ==
Information correct after match played on 5 March 2022. Only competitive matches are counted.

Name	Nationality	From	To	P	W	D	L	GF	GA	Win%	Ref.
Frederik Bägerfeldt	Sweden	3 September 2016	1 October 2016	0	0	0	0	0	0	—	
Carlton Chapman	India	1 October 2016	31 May 2017	6	1	2	3	6	9	16.67	
Arjunan Shanta Kumar	India	31 May 2017	2017	0	0	0	0	0	0	—	
Pushpender Kundu	India	7 January 2018	8 November 2020	0	0	0	0	0	0	—	
Chencho Dorji	Bhutan	22 September 2020	9 November 2021	14	5	3	6	16	14	35.71	
Mehrajuddin Wadoo (caretaker)	India	13 November 2021	September 2022	13	2	4	7	9	19	15.38	
Atsushi Nakamura	Japan	1 September 2022	13 December 2022	6	0	0	6	3	13	0.00	
Sankarlal Chakraborty	India	14 December 2022	3 August 2023	15	3	4	8	0	0	20.00	
Chencho Dorji	Bhutan	20 September 2023	present	0	0	0	0	0	0	—	

== Team records ==
=== Season by season ===
As of 6 June 2023

Season	League								Second Phase	Super Cup	Other competitions	Top league scorer(s)		Ref.
Season	P	W	D	L	GF	GA	Pts	Position	Second Phase	Super Cup	Durand Cup	Player	Goals	Ref.
2016–17	6	1	2	3	6	9	5	4th	DNQ	did not exist ▼	DNP	(India) Syed Shoaib Ahmed	2	
2020–21	14	5	3	6	16	14	18	8th	2nd	Tournament Suspended	DNP	(India) Kean Lewis	3	
2021–22	17	4	5	8	13	23	17	11th		Tournament Suspended	Group stage	(India) Abhijit Sarkar	1	
2022–23	22	3	4	15	25	56	13	12th		DNQ	DNQ	(Argentina) Alexis Gómez	8	

== Honours ==
=== League ===
- I-League 2
  - Third place: 2023–24

=== Cup ===
- Hot Weather Football Championship
  - Champions (1): 2019
- LAHDC Climate Cup
  - Champions (1): 2025

== Notable players ==
The following foreign players of Sudeva Delhi – have been capped at senior/youth international level for their respective countries. Years in brackets indicate their spells at the club.

- (Haiti) Peterson Joseph (2016–2017)
- (Trinidad and Tobago) Daneil Cyrus (2022)
- (Tajikistan) Shavkati Khotam (2023)

== Affiliated clubs ==
The following clubs are currently affiliated with Sudeva Delhi FC:

Strategic affiliation

- (Germany) VfB Stuttgart (2024–present)

Acquisitive affiliation

- (Spain) CD Olímpic de Xàtiva (2018–present)

Affiliation as part of the "Bellmare Asia Football Alliance"

- (Japan) Shonan Bellmare (2022–present)
- (Cambodia) Boeung Ket (2022–present)
- (China) Wuhan Three Towns (2022–present)
- (Laos) FC Chanthabouly (2022–present)
- (Philippines) Davao Aguilas (2022–present)

== Other departments ==
=== Football (youth men's) ===
Sudeva Delhi is known for running football academics, grassroot developments, full-fledged residential facilities, through the formation of Sudeva Sports Village in Delhi. Since the inception of youth section, the club has been operating its U13, Club's football academy gained an 'elite category' accreditation by the AIFF. U15, U19 teams, and participating in various age-group leagues conducted by both the Football Delhi (FD) and AIFF. In 2018–19 Hero Sub-Junior League, the team was managed by Nigerian coach Oladipupo Joseph Odu. In 2022, Sudeva tied-up with HCL Foundation for the advancement of residential football program.

Club's U17 team for the first time, took part in the 2022–23 U-17 Youth Cup in January 2023, after going through the qualification stages. In semi-finals, they defeated Chennaiyin. In final on 31 January, the club finished as runner-up, after a 2–0 defeat to Classic FA. Sudeva Delhi participated in 2023 Reliance Foundation Development League, in which they moved to "National championship stage", and ended up as runners-up. In May, they participated in Premier League's 2023 edition of Next Gen Cup in Mumbai and faced teams like Everton.

Honours

- JSW U-13 Youth Cup
  - Champions (1): 2022
- FD U-18 Youth League
  - Champions (1): 2022–23
- Hero U-17 Youth League
  - Runners-up (2): 2022–23, 2023–24
- FD U-13 Youth League
  - Champions (1): 2022–23
- FD U-15 Youth League
  - Champions (1): 2022–23
- Shaheed Bhagat Singh Cup (U-18)
  - Runners-up (1): 2022
- Reliance Development League
  - Runners-up (1): 2023

=== Football (women's) ===
Sudeva Delhi began its women's football section in May 2022, to compete in domestic leagues. The club then roped in Disha Malhotra Julka as head coach, who is India's first female FA license holder. In 2023–24 season of FD Women's League, Sudeva Delhi secured third-place finish.

Honours

- FD Women's Premier League
  - Third place (1): 2022–23

=== Futsal ===
The futsal section of Sudeva Delhi has participated in the inaugural edition of AIFF Futsal Club Championship under coaching of Prakhar Agarwal, in which they failed to reach the knock-out stages. In the 2021–22 season, the club secured two big wins, defeated Classic FA 6–1, and Real Kashmir 9–5.

== See also ==
- List of football clubs in Delhi
- Sport in Delhi
- Sudeva Delhi Futsal
