= Delhi Soccer Association =

Association football governing body in Delhi

Delhi Soccer Association (Football Delhi)
- Sport: Football
- Jurisdiction: Delhi
- Abbreviation: DSA
- Founded: 1926 (as Delhi Football Association)
- Affiliation: All India Football Federation (AIFF)
- Headquarters: New Delhi
- President: Bahadur Singh Mehra

Official website
- footballdelhi.com

Former logo for Football Delhi (2017–23)

The Delhi Soccer Association, also known as Football Delhi, is one of the 36 Indian state football associations that are affiliated to the All India Football Federation. It is the governing body of football-related sports in the National Capital Region (India). The Delhi football team is also administered by Football Delhi. It sends state teams for Santosh Trophy and Rajmata Jijabai Trophy.

== History ==
The DSA was originally founded as the Delhi Football Association in 1926. The parent organisation was founded by Professor Mohammed Zubair Qureshi, along with Sardar Sabha Singh and Youngmen FC secretary RB Sen. Qureshi also served as the first secretary of Delhi FA. In the 1980s, due to the deep factions, rebel leagues and dual teams emerging for Santosh Trophy from Delhi football environment, the Delhi Soccer Association was formed in order to bring the factions under a single umbrella and reach a compromise following a court ruling in 1992–93. The organisation and logo were rebranded by the then elected President Shaji Prabhakaran to Football Delhi in 2017. This was reversed in 2023, following the election of the President Anuj Gupta.

== State teams ==
=== Men ===
- Delhi football team
- Delhi under-20 football team
- Delhi under-15 football team
- Delhi under-13 football team

=== Women ===
- Delhi women's football team
- Delhi women's under-19 football team
- Delhi women's under-17 football team

== Club competitions ==
=== Men's ===
- Delhi Premier League
- FD Senior Division League
- FD A-Division
- FD B-Division
- FD C-Division

=== Women's ===
- FD Women's Premier League
- FD Women's B-Division League

=== Youth ===
- Delhi Future Stars Youth / Grassroot / School League

=== Futsal ===
- FD Futsal League
- FD Women's Futsal League

=== Other ===
- Shaheed Bhagat Singh Memorial Cup

== Pyramid ==
=== Men's ===
Delhi Football League
Tier	Division
1 _{(Level 5 on Indian Football pyramid)}	Delhi Premier League _{↑promote (to I-League 3) ↓relegate}
2 _{(Level 6 on Indian Football pyramid)}	FD Senior Division League _{↑promote ↓relegate}
3 _{(Level 7 on Indian Football pyramid)}	FD A-Division _{↑promote↓relegate}
4 _{(Level 8 on Indian Football pyramid)}	FD B-Division _{↑promote↓relegate}
5 _{(Level 9 on Indian Football pyramid)}	FD C-Division _{↑promote}

=== Women's ===
FD Women's League
Tier	Division
I _{(Level 2 on Indian Women's Football pyramid)}	FD Women's Premier League _{↑promote (to Indian Women's League 2) ↓relegate}
II _{(Level 3 on Indian Women's Football Pyramid)}	FD Women's Championship _{↑promote}

== Evolution ==
Years		1826	1848– 2020	2020–2021	2021–2022	2022–present
Level		1826	1848– 2020	2020–2021	2021–2022	2022–present
Men's
State leagues	1	Formation of Football Delhi (FD) as Delhi Soccer Association (DSA)	FD Senior Division League			Delhi Premier League
State leagues	2	Formation of Football Delhi (FD) as Delhi Soccer Association (DSA)	None			FD Senior Division League
State leagues	3	Formation of Football Delhi (FD) as Delhi Soccer Association (DSA)	None		FD A-Division	
State leagues	4	Formation of Football Delhi (FD) as Delhi Soccer Association (DSA)	None		FD B-Division	
State leagues	5	Formation of Football Delhi (FD) as Delhi Soccer Association (DSA)	None		FD C-Division	
Women's
State leagues	1		None	FD Women's Premier League		

== See also ==
- List of Indian state football associations
- Football in India
- Sport in Delhi
