= 2022–23 Rajasthan United FC season =

5th season in existence of Rajasthan United FC

Rajasthan United
2022–23 season
- Head coach: (India) Pushpender Kundu
- Stadium: Ambedkar Stadium
- I-League: 9th
- Durand Cup: Quarter-finals
- Baji Rout Cup: Winners
- Super Cup: Qualifying playoff
- Top goalscorer: League: Aidar Mambetaliev (4 goals); All: Martín Cháves (5 goals)
- Highest home attendance: 4,875 (vs NEROCA)
- Lowest home attendance: 300 (vs Sreenidi Deccan)
- Average home league attendance: 1,369
- Biggest win: 0–3 (vs Sreenidi Deccan (A), 6 November 2022, Baji Rout Cup)
- Biggest defeat: 0–5 (vs Churchill Brothers (H), 17 January 2023, I-League)
Home colours	Away colours	Third colours
- All statistics correct as of 3 April 2023.

The 2022–23 season is the fifth season in Indian professional football club Rajasthan United FC's existence, and their 2nd season in I-League. In addition to the I-League, Rajasthan United will also participate in the Durand Cup and the Super Cup.

== First-team squad ==
As of 24 January 2023

Squad no.	Player	Nationality	Position(s)	Age	Signed from	Since	Apps	Goals
Goalkeepers
1	Vishal Joon	(India)	GK	27	(India) Friends United	2021	11	0
13	Rafique Ali Sardar	(India)	GK	24	(India) Mohammedan	2022	8	0
24	Subhojeet Basu	(India)	GK	29	(India) Indian Air Force	2022	0	0
	Niraj Kumar	(India)	GK	20	(India) Jamshedpur	2022	3	0
Defenders
2	Novin Gurung	(India)	RB	23	(India) Indian Navy	2022	0	0
4	Kojam Beyong	(India)	CB	19	(India) Jamshedpur B	2022	5	0
5	Amritpal Singh	(India)	RB	21	(India) Hyderabad	2022	3	1
17	Jagdeep Singh	(India)	LB	21	(India) Bengaluru B	2022	4	0
23	Melroy Assisi	(India)	CB	23	(India) Chennaiyin	2022	22	1
28	Md Fayazuddin Shah	(India)	LB	23	(India) TRAU	2022	4	0
67	Aidar Mambetaliev	(Kyrgyzstan)	CB	24	(Kyrgyzstan) Alga Bishkek	2022	13	2
71	Sanwil D'Costa	(India)	RB	22	(Bhutan) FC Takin	2023		
Midfielders
6	Lalliansanga Renthlei	(India)	DM / CM	23	(India) Sudeva Delhi	2022	14	0
8	Bektur Amangeldiev	(Kyrgyzstan)	DM / CM	23	(Kyrgyzstan) Dordoi Bishkek	2022	9	2
11	William Neihsial	(India)	RM	24	(India) Sudeva Delhi	2022	13	0
12	Pintu Mahata	(India)	CM	25	(India) Indian Navy	2022	3	0
15	Yash Tripathi	(India)	CM	21	(India) Neerja Modi Academy	2022	0	0
18	Souvik Das	(India)	CM	27	(India) Sudeva Delhi	2023		
20	Ragav Gupta	(India)	CM	23	(India) Real Kashmir	2022	11	0
21	Zoma Vanlalzahawhma	(India)	AM	21	(India) Sudeva Delhi	2022	2	0
33	Britto PM	(India)	RM	29	(India) Indian Navy	2022	8	2
88	Rohmingthanga Bawlte	(India)	LM	23	(India) Real Kashmir	2022	0	0
Forwards
7	Atai Dzhumashev	(Kyrgyzstan)	LW	24	(Kyrgyzstan) Abdysh-Ata Kant	2023	1	0
9	Otabek Zokirov	(Uzbekistan)	LW	30	(Tajikistan) Istaravshan	2023		
14	Alister Anthony	(India)	ST / RW	21	(Ivory Coast) ES Bafing	2022		
25	Léonce Dodoz	(Ivory Coast)	ST	30	(Ivory Coast) Ambernath United	2023		
29	Lalremsanga	(India)	RW	21	(India) Aizawl	2022	11	1
30	Chanso Horam	(India)	LW	21	(India) Mumbai City	2022	8	0
32	Owais Khatib	(India)	CF	25	(India) PIFA Sports	2022	0	0
75	Shaiborlang Kharpan	(India)	CF	27	(India) Sudeva Delhi	2022	7	0
	Sérgio Barboza	(Brazil)	RW	29	(Guatemala) Suchitepéquez	2022	3	1

== Transfers and loans ==
=== Transfers In ===
Entry Date	Position	No	Player	Previous Club	Fee	Source
4 July 2022	MF	8	(India) Pintu Mahata	(India) Indian Navy	None	
5 July 2022	DF	28	(India) Fayazuddin Shah	(India) TRAU	None	
7 July 2022	FW	33	(India) Britto PM	(India) Indian Navy	None	
13 July 2022	FW	75	(India) Shaiborlang Kharpan	(India) Sudeva Delhi	None	
15 July 2022	FW	29	(India) Lalremsanga Fanai	(India) Aizawl	None	
16 July 2022	MF	9	(India) Yash Tripathi	(India) Odisha	None	
17 July 2022	GK	1	(India) Niraj Kumar	(India) Jamshedpur	None	
21 July 2022	FW	49	(India) William Lalnunfela	(India) NorthEast United	None	
22 July 2022	DF	15	(India) Novin Gurung	(India) Indian Navy	None	
1 August 2022	FW	14	(India) Alister Anthony	(India) Ambernath United	None	
2 August 2022	MF	6	(India) Lalliansanga Renthlei	(India) Sudeva Delhi	None	
4 August 2022	MF	11	(India) William Neihsial	(India) Sudeva Delhi	None	
4 August 2022	MF		(India) Surchandra Singh	(India) Real Kashmir	None	
5 August 2022	DF	05	(India) Amritpal Singh	(India) Hyderabad	None	
5 August 2022	DF	33	(India) Jagdeep Singh	(India) Bengaluru B	None	
6 August 2022	MF	8	(Kyrgyzstan) Bektur Amangeldiev	(Kyrgyzstan) Dordoi Bishkek	None	
6 August 2022	DF	67	(Kyrgyzstan) Aydar Mambetaliev	(Kyrgyzstan) Alga Bishkek	None	
7 August 2022	FW	7	(Brazil) Sérgio Barboza	(Guatemala) Suchitepéquez	None	
7 August 2022	MF	6	(India) Ragav Gupta	(India) Real Kashmir	None	
8 August 2022	MF	9	(Lebanon) Youssef Atriss	(Lebanon) Bourj	None	
8 August 2022	MF		(India) Anant Tawe	(India) RU Academy	None	
8 August 2022	DF		(India) Yura Tarung	(India) RU Academy	None	
16 August 2022	FW	10	(Uruguay) Martín Cháves	(Greece) Rodos	None	
29 September 2022	MF		(Spain) Joseba Beitia	(India) RoundGlass Punjab	None	
04 October 2022	FW		(The Gambia) Nuha Marong	(Bangladesh) Bashundhara Kings	None	
23 October 2022	FW	32	(India) Owais Khatib		None	
23 October 2022	GK		(India) MD Rafique Sardar		None	
23 October 2022	GK		(India) Subhojeet Basu		None	
03 January 2023	FW	25	(Ivory Coast) Léonce Dodoz	(Ivory Coast) ES Bafing	None	
04 January 2023	MF	18	(India) Souvik Das	(India) Sudeva Delhi	None	
04 January 2023	DF	71	(India) Sanwil D'Costa	(Bhutan) FC Takin	None	
05 January 2023	FW	9	(Uzbekistan) Otabek Zokirov	(Tajikistan) Istaravshan	None	
05 January 2023	FW	7	(Kyrgyzstan) Atai Dzhumashev	(Kyrgyzstan) Abdysh-Ata Kant	None	

=== Loans in ===
Starts Date	End date	No	Position	Player	From Club	Fee	Source
4 July 2022	30 June 2023	30	FW	(India) Chanso Horam	(India) Mumbai City	None	

=== Transfers out ===
Exit Date	Position	No	Player	To Club	Fee	Source
11 June 2022	DF	2	(India) Gurmukh Singh	(India) Chennaiyin	None	
28 June 2022	DF	27	(India) Abhishek Ambekar	(India) Mohammedan	None	
28 June 2022	MF	40	(India) Pritam Singh	(India) Mohammedan	None	
30 June 2022	DF	3	(India) Pawan Joshi	(India) Vatika FC	None	
1 July 2022	DF	22	(India) Shreyansh Choudhary	(India) Jaipur Elite	None	
1 July 2022	FW	33	(India) Sauma Das	(India) Southern Samity	None	
4 July 2022	GK	22	(India) Bhaskar Roy	(India) Mumbai City	None	
9 July 2022	DM	23	(Nigeria) Akeem Abioye	(India) Garhwal FC	None	
30 July 2022	GK	32	(India) Dibyendu sarkar	(India) Peerless	None	
30 July 2022	DM	5	(Brazil) Fabiano Alves		None	
30 August 2022	GK	01	(India) Niraj Kumar	(India) Odisha	Undisclosed	
7 September 2022	MF		(India) Surchandra Singh	(India) NEROCA F C	Undisclosed	
10 October 2022	DF		(India) Yura tarun	(India) Reserves		
10 October 2022	DF		(India) Amritpal Singh	(India) Reserves		
10 October 2022	DF		(India) Saurabh Bhanwala	(India) Reserves		
10 October 2022	FW		(Brazil) Sérgio Barboza	(India) Reserves		
10 October 2022	FW		(India) Alocious Muthayyan	(India) Reserves		
10 October 2022	FW		(India) William Lalnunfela	(India) Reserves		
10 October 2022	FW		(India) Aman Thapa	(India) Reserves		
10 October 2022	FW		(India) Yuvraj Singh	(India) Reserves		
10 October 2022	MF		(India) Shilton D'Silva	(India) Reserves		
01 January 2023	FW	45	(The Gambia) Nuha Marong	(Malaysia) Kelantan FC		
01 January 2023	FW	9	(Lebanon) Youssef Atriss			
01 January 2023	FW	10	(Uruguay) Martín Cháves	(India) Churchill Brothers		
2 January 2023	MF	43	(Spain) Omar Ramos	(India) Gokulam Kerala	None	
21 January 2023	MF	77	(India) Gyamar Nikum	(India) Mumbai City	₹6,00,0000	
23 January 2023	MF	90	(Spain) Joseba Beitia	(India) NorthEast United FC	Undisclosed	
27 January 2023	DF	93	(India) Hardik Bhatt	(India) Mumbai City	Undisclosed	
28 January 2023	MF	31	(India) Shilton D'Silva	(India) Gokulam Kerala	None	

== Management ==
As of 1 November 2022

Role	Name	Refs.
Head Coach/Manager	(India) Pushpender Kundu	
Assistant Coach	(India) Peejay Singh	
Team Manager	(India) Nikhil Shetty	
Strength and Conditioning Coach	(India) Pushpendra Singh	
Goalkeeping Coach	(India) Joel Prabhakar Raj	
Physio	(India) Ashwin Kumar P	
Masseur	(India) Mithun Dhibar	

== Pre-season and friendlies ==
Win Draw Loss

30 September 2022 Friendly	Goa	3–0	Rajasthan United	Salvador do Mundo, Goa
18.00 IST				Stadium: Salvador do Mundo

2 October 2022 Friendly	Churchill Brothers	2–1	Rajasthan United	Navelim, Goa
09.00 IST				Stadium: Rosary Ground

13 October 2022 Friendly	Rajasthan United	3–2	RoundGlass Punjab	Jaipur, Rajasthan
09.45 IST				Stadium: Poornima University

26 October 2022 Friendly	Rajasthan United	3–1	Sudeva Delhi	New Delhi
15.45 IST	Cháves 50' (pen.), 56'; Barboza 74'			Stadium: Ambedkar Stadium

== Competition ==
=== Overview ===
Win Draw Loss

Competition	First match	Last match	Starting round	Final position	Record							
Competition	First match	Last match	Starting round	Final position	Pld	W	D	L	GF	GA	GD	Win %
Baji Rout Cup	4 November 2022	8 November 2022	Quarter-finals	Winners	3	2	1	0	7	2	+5	66.67
Durand Cup	20 August 2022	12 September 2022	Group stage	Quarter-finals	5	2	1	2	7	10	−3	40.00
Super Cup	3 April 2023	3 April 2023	Qualifying Playoff	Qualifying Playoff	1	0	1	0	2	2	+0	0.00
I-League	15 November 2022	11 March 2023	Matchday 1	9th	22	7	4	11	19	32	−13	31.82
Total					31	11	7	13	35	46	−11	35.48

Last updated: 11 March 2023
Source: Soccerway

=== Durand Cup ===
Rajasthan United were drawn in the Group B for the 131st edition of the Durand Cup along with three other ISL sides.

==== Group stage ====
Pos	Team	Pld	W	D	L	GF	GA	GD	Pts	Qualification	MCI	RUN	AMB	EAB	INA
1	Mumbai City	4	2	1	1	13	7	+6	7 (Note: Head-to-head points: Mumbai City 4, Rajasthan United 3, Mohun Bagan 1.)	Qualify for the Knockout stage	—	5–1	—	—	4–1
2	Rajasthan United	4	2	1	1	6	7	−1	7	Qualify for the Knockout stage	—	—	—	—	2–0
3	Mohun Bagan (H)	4	2	1	1	6	4	+2	7		1–1	2–3	—	—	2–0
4	East Bengal (H)	4	1	2	1	4	4	0	5		4–3	0–0	0–1	—	0–0
5	Indian Navy	4	0	1	3	1	8	−7	1		—	—	—	—	—

Source: Sportstar
Rules for classification: 1) points; 2) head-to-head points; 3) head-to-head goal difference; 4) goal difference; 5) number of goals scored; 6) drawing of lots
(H) Hosts

==== Matches ====
Win Draw Loss

20 August 2022 1	ATK Mohun Bagan	2–3	Rajasthan United	Kolkata, West Bengal
18.00 IST	Hnamte (yellow card) 41'; Nassiri 43'; Kuruniyan 46'; Rathi (yellow card) 56'	Report	Amangeldiev 45+1'; Fanai 60'; Nikum 90+5'	Stadium: Vivekananda Yuba Bharati Krirangan; Attendance: 2,820; Referee: Crystal John; Man of the Match: Niraj Kumar (Rajasthan United)

25 August 2022 2	East Bengal	0–0	Rajasthan United	Kolkata, West Bengal
18.00 IST	Lima (yellow card) 59'; González (yellow card) 79'; Rahman (yellow card) 90+5'	Report	Mambetaliev (yellow card) 13'; Amangeldiev (yellow card) 53'	Stadium: Kishore Bharati Krirangan; Attendance: 7,132; Referee: Crystal John; Man of the Match: Melroy Melwin Assisi (Rajasthan United)

29 August 2022 3	Mumbai City	5–1	Rajasthan United	Kolkata, West Bengal
15.00 IST	Stewart 10'; Chhangte 18'; Mehtab 36' (yellow card) 84'; Jahouh 63'; Stalin (yellow card) 69'; Vikram 90+2'	Report	Assisi (yellow card) 48'; Nikum 67'; Atriss (yellow card) 83'	Stadium: Kishore Bharati Krirangan; Referee: Rahul Kumar Gupta; Man of the Match: Ahmed Jahouh (Mumbai City)

5 September 2022 4	Rajasthan United	2–0	Indian Navy	Kolkata, West Bengal
15.00 IST	Atriss 73'; Barboza 89' (yellow card) 89'	Report	Thapa (yellow card) 59'	Stadium: Kishore Bharati Krirangan; Referee: Lakshay Tushir; Man of the Match: Martín Cháves (Rajasthan United)

==== Quarter-finals ====
12 September 2022 QF	Hyderabad	3–1	Rajasthan United	Kolkata, West Bengal
18.00 IST	Ogbeche 6'; Mishra 45'; Siverio 68'; Onaindia (yellow card) 80'	Report	Cháves 29' (pen.); Mambetaliev (yellow card) 49'	Stadium: Kishore Bharati Krirangan; Attendance: 1,024; Man of the Match: Akash Mishra (Hyderabad)

=== Baji Rout Cup ===
==== Matches ====
Win Draw Loss

==== Quarter finals ====
4 November 2022 QF	Rajasthan United	2–0	Mohammedan	Angul, Odisha
14.00 IST	Cháves 21'; Marong 54'	Report		Stadium: Kadam Padia Stadium; Man of the Match: Martín Cháves (Rajasthan United)

==== Semi finals ====
6 November 2022 SF	Sreenidi Deccan	0–3	Rajasthan United	Angul, Odisha
14.00 IST		Report	Cháves 45+1'; Marong 55'; Beitia 81' (pen.)	Stadium: Kadam Padia Stadium; Man of the Match: Martín Cháves (Rajasthan United)

==== Final ====
8 November 2022 Final	Churchill Brothers	2–2 (a.e.t.) (2–4 p)	Rajasthan United	Talcher, Odisha
13.30 IST	Pakparvar 45+1'; Mapuia 83'	Report	Kharpan 7'; R. Gupta 10'	Stadium: Black Diamond Stadium; Man of the Match: Rafique Ali Sardar (Rajasthan United)
	Penalties
	M. Cissé (penalty scored); Mapuia (penalty missed); Costa (penalty scored); Tana (penalty missed)		Barboza (penalty scored); R. Gupta (penalty scored); Beitia (penalty scored); Cháves (penalty scored)

=== I-League ===
==== League table ====
Pos	Team	Pld	W	D	L	GF	GA	GD	Pts	Qualification
7	Aizawl	22	6	8	8	27	29	−2	26 (Note: Head-to-head points: Aizawl 4, Mohammedan 1.)	
8	Mohammedan	22	7	5	10	34	35	−1	26	
9	Rajasthan United	22	7	4	11	19	32	−13	25 (Note: Head-to-head points: Rajasthan United 6, NEROCA 0.)	
10	NEROCA	22	7	4	11	22	26	−4	25	
11	Kenkre (R)	22	3	8	11	23	40	−17	17	Relegation to 2023–24 I-League 2

Source: I-League
Rules for classification: 1) points; 2) head-to-head points; 3) head-to-head goal difference; 4) goal difference; 5) number of goals scored; 6) drawing of lots
(R) Relegated

==== League Results by Round ====
Match	1	2	3	4	5	6	7	8	9	10	11	12	13	14	15	16	17	18	19	20	21	22
Ground	A	A	A	A	H	H	A	A	H	H	H	H	H	H	A	A	H	A	A	A	H	H
Result	W	L	D	W	W	D	L	L	W	D	W	L	L	L	L	L	L	D	W	W	L	L
League Position	3	8	7	4	4	4	5	7	5	6	6	6	7	8	8	9	10	10	9	7	9	9

Updated to match(es) played on 11 March 2023. Source: I-League
A = Away; H = Home; W = Win; D = Draw; L = Loss

==== Matches ====
Note: I-league announced the fixtures for the 2022–23 season on 1 November 2022.

15 November 2022 1	Churchill Brothers	1–2	Rajasthan United	Bambolim, Goa
19.00 IST	Gaikwad (yellow card) 22'; Sané 45+1'; Costa (yellow card) 81'	Report	Neihsial (yellow card) 24'; Beitia (yellow card) 26'; M. Assisi 29' (yellow card) 34'; H. Bhatt (yellow card) 49' (yellow-red card) 84'; Cháves (yellow card) 68'; Britto 75'	Stadium: GMC Athletic Stadium; Attendance: 1,832; Referee: Akashkumar Kamleshkumar Mehta; Man of the Match: Britto PM (Rajasthan United)

19 November 2022 2	Real Kashmir	2–0	Rajasthan United	Srinagar, Jammu and Kashmir
14.00 IST	Moro 20'; Singh (yellow card) 34'; I. Seidu (yellow card) 51'; George (yellow card) 70'; Pulamte 77'	Report	Cháves (yellow card) 10'; M. Assisi (yellow card) 66'	Stadium: TRC Turf Ground; Attendance: 4,000; Referee: Jatinder Singh; Man of the Match: Lamine Moro (Real Kashmir)

23 November 2022 3	RoundGlass Punjab	1–1	Rajasthan United	Panchkula, Haryana
16.30 IST	Lalhlimpuia 13'; Ignjatović (yellow card) 17'; Šećerović (yellow card) 65'	Report	Mambetaliev (yellow card) 45+3'; Cháves (yellow card) 77'; Nikum 90+1'; Marong (yellow card) 90+2'	Stadium: Tau Devi Lal Stadium; Attendance: 1,137; Referee: Lakshay; Man of the Match: Daniel Lalhlimpuia (RoundGlass Punjab)

26 November 2022 4	Sudeva Delhi	1–3	Rajasthan United	New Delhi, Delhi
14.00 IST	T. Misawa 22'; S. Nongmeikapam (yellow card) 73'	Report	Cháves 16'; Britto 45+3'; Renthlei (yellow card) 50'; H. Bhatt (yellow card) 53'; Mambetaliev 85'; Ali Sardar (yellow card) 90+7'	Stadium: Chhatrasal Stadium; Attendance: 3,506; Referee: Mithun Kumar Kundu; Man of the Match: Martín Cháves (Rajasthan United)

3 December 2022 5	Rajasthan United	1–0	NEROCA	New Delhi, Delhi
14.00 IST	Mambetaliev 38' (yellow card) 50'; M. Assisi (yellow card) 90+4'	Report	M. Kosimov (yellow card) 45+2'; Simbo (yellow card) 64'; Jakhonov (yellow card) 67'; Reamsochung (yellow card) 80'	Stadium: Ambedkar Stadium; Attendance: 4,875; Referee: Mrutyunjay L Amatya; Man of the Match: Joseba Beitia (Rajasthan United)

7 December 2022 6	Rajasthan United	1–1	Mumbai Kenkre	New Delhi, Delhi
16.30 IST	Amangeldiev 74'	Report	A. Gaikwad 52'; Raju (yellow card) 72'; Nongkhlaw (yellow card) 82'; Lalhmangaihsanga (yellow card) 90+2'	Stadium: Ambedkar Stadium; Attendance: 3,025; Referee: Akashkumar Kamleshkumar Mehta; Man of the Match: Aman Gaikwad (Mumbai Kenkre)

12 December 2022 7	Gokulam Kerala	1–0	Rajasthan United	Manjeri, Kerala
19.00 IST	A. Somlaga (yellow card) 38'; Sreekuttan 51'; D. Ndo (yellow card) 81'; Shijin T (yellow card) 82'	Report	Ali Sardar (yellow card) 90+8'; Beitia (yellow card) 90+11' (red card) 90+11'	Stadium: Payyanad Stadium; Attendance: 3,600; Referee: Lakshay; Man of the Match: Sreekuttan VS (Gokulam Kerala)

15 December 2022 8	TRAU	3–1	Rajasthan United	Imphal, Manipur
14.00 IST	Tursunov 32', 45'; Bodo 70'; B. Samte (yellow card) 90+2'	Report	V. Joon (yellow card) 44'; Singh 65'; Mahata (yellow card) 90+2'	Stadium: Khuman Lampak Stadium; Attendance: 1,727; Referee: Tanmoy Dhar; Man of the Match: Komron Tursunov (TRAU)

20 December 2022 9	Rajasthan United	1–0	Aizawl	New Delhi, Delhi
19.00 IST	Cháves 13'	Report	E. Makinde (yellow card) 27'	Stadium: Ambedkar Stadium; Attendance: 1,356; Referee: Srikant Bohidar; Man of the Match: Martín Cháves (Rajasthan United)

6 January 2023 10	Rajasthan United	1–1	Mohammedan	New Delhi, Delhi
16.30 IST	Beitia (penalty missed) 87' (pen.); Neihsial (yellow card) 65'	Report	N'Diaye (yellow card) 28'; Thangmuansang (yellow card) 80'; Joseph 81'	Stadium: Ambedkar Stadium; Attendance: 600; Referee: Lakshay; Man of the Match: Rafique Ali Sardar (Rajasthan United)

11 January 2023 11	Rajasthan United	1–0	Sreenidi Deccan	New Delhi, Delhi
19.00 IST	Mambetaliev 43'; M. Assisi (yellow card) 55'; Renthlei (yellow card) 75'	Report	Shayesteh (yellow card) 45+2'; Akhtar (yellow card) 63'; Mayakkannan (yellow card) 90+3'; Lamba (yellow card) 90+5'	Stadium: Ambedkar Stadium; Referee: Williams Joy Koshi; Man of the Match: Aidar Mambetaliev (Rajasthan United)

17 January 2023 12	Rajasthan United	0–5	Churchill Brothers	New Delhi, Delhi
19.00 IST		Report	E. Yaghr 2', 54'; Sané 29', 90'; A. Gaonkar 61'; Vaz (yellow card) 62'	Stadium: Ambedkar Stadium; Attendance: 1,123; Referee: Dipu Roy; Man of the Match: Abdoulaye Sané (Churchill Brothers)

28 January 2023 13	Rajasthan United	1–2	TRAU	New Delhi, Delhi
14.00 IST	Kharpan 19'; Britto (yellow card) 90+2' (yellow-red card) 90+4'	Report	S. Johnson Singh 14'; Tursunov 40'; G. Yeboah (yellow card) 90+2'	Stadium: Ambedkar Stadium; Attendance: 1,129; Referee: Jehrul Islam; Man of the Match: Salam Johnson Singh (TRAU)

2 February 2023 14	Rajasthan United	2–3	Sudeva Delhi	New Delhi, Delhi
16.30 IST	Amritpal (yellow card) 5' (yellow-red card) 8'; Sukhandeep 20' (o.g.); Dzhumashev 31'; Amangeldiev (yellow card) 61'; M. Assisi (yellow card) 75'	Report	S. Lotjem 20'; Gómez 26'; N. Darjee (yellow card) 36'; Sukhandeep (yellow card) 58'; S. Khotam 67'	Stadium: Ambedkar Stadium; Attendance: 1,212; Referee: Joyshing Monsang Thumli; Man of the Match: Shavkati Hotam (Sudeva Delhi)

9 February 2023 15	Aizawl	2–1	Rajasthan United	Aizawl, Mizoram
14.00 IST	Sailo (yellow card) 16'; A. Saito (yellow card) 35'; Ralte (yellow card) 40'; Lalchhawnkima (yellow card) 43'; Tharpuia 71'; Veras 90+6'	Report	Mambetaliev 17'; M. Assisi (yellow card) 85'	Stadium: Rajiv Gandhi Stadium; Attendance: 1,245; Referee: Lakshay; Man of the Match: Ivan Veras (Aizawl)

12 February 2023 16	Sreenidi Deccan	2–0	Rajasthan United	Hyderabad, Telangana
15.00 IST	Akhtar 5'; Lalromawia 40'	Report	M. Assisi (yellow card) 24'; Gurung (yellow card) 71' (yellow-red card) 90+4'; Amangeldiev (yellow card) 74'; Amritpal (yellow card) 84'	Stadium: Deccan Arena; Attendance: 198; Referee: K Ramdasan; Man of the Match: David Castañeda (Sreenidi Deccan)

15 February 2023 17	Rajasthan United	1–2	Gokulam Kerala	New Delhi, Delhi
16.30 IST	Neihsial (yellow card) 4'; Amangeldiev 9'; Renthlei (yellow card) 39' (red card) 89'; Britto (yellow card) 90+2'; J. Singh (yellow card) 90+7'	Report	R. Raju (yellow card) 11'; Noufal (yellow card) 62'; Mendigutxia 90' (pen.), 90+8'	Stadium: Ambedkar Stadium; Attendance: 407; Referee: Rahul Kumar Gupta; Man of the Match: Sergio Mendigutxia (Gokulam Kerala)

18 February 2023 18	Mumbai Kenkre	0–0	Rajasthan United	Mumbai, Maharashtra
16.30 IST	A. Panchal (yellow card) 15'; R. Bidias Rim (yellow card) 16'; F. Nwankwo (penalty missed)	Report	V. Joon (yellow card) 42'; O. Zokirov (yellow card) 90+3'; Dzhumashev (yellow card) 90+5'	Stadium: Cooperage Ground; Referee: Lakshay; Man of the Match: Tenzin Samdup (Mumbai Kenkre)

23 February 2023 19	NEROCA	0–1	Rajasthan United	Imphal, Manipur
16.30 IST	T. Ragui (yellow card) 5'; Gopi Singh (yellow card) 90+3'	Report	O. Zokirov 29'; Gurung (yellow card) 81'	Stadium: Khuman Lampak Main Stadium; Attendance: 4,328; Referee: I Jamal Mohamed; Man of the Match: Otabek Zokirov (Rajasthan United)

28 February 2023 20	Mohammedan	0–1	Rajasthan United	Kolkata, West Bengal
19.00 IST	Kima (yellow card) 84'; Milan (yellow card) 90'; Thangmuansang (yellow card) 90+6'	Report	O. Zokirov 9'; J. Singh (yellow card) 81'	Stadium: Kishore Bharati Krirangan; Attendance: 1,356; Referee: Jatinder Singh; Man of the Match: Melroy Assisi (Rajasthan United)

4 March 2023 21	Rajasthan United	0–4	RoundGlass Punjab	New Delhi, Delhi
17.30 IST	Gurung (yellow card) 15'; Amangeldiev (yellow card) 62'; Amritpal (yellow card) 90+1'; M. Assisi (yellow card) 90+4'	Report	Y. Tripathi 16' (o.g.); Majcen 41'; Mera 76' (yellow card) 77'; Meitei (yellow card) 85'; Valpuia 90+2'	Stadium: Ambedkar Stadium; Attendance: 500; Referee: Pratik Mondal; Man of the Match: Chencho Gyeltshen (RoundGlass Punjab)

11 March 2023 22	Rajasthan United	0–1	Real Kashmir	New Delhi, Delhi
16.30 IST	M. Assisi (yellow card) 45+1'; Mahata (yellow card) 85'	Report	Boateng 7' (yellow card) 71'; Bawitlung (yellow card) 72'; Lourenco (yellow card) 82'; Prateek (yellow card) 90+4'	Stadium: Ambedkar Stadium; Attendance: 536; Referee: K Ramdasan; Man of the Match: Ernest Boateng (Real Kashmir)

=== Super Cup ===
After finishing 9th in the I-League, Rajasthan United had to play a qualifying playoff against 10th-ranked NEROCA to earn a place in the qualifiers, but they were beaten on penalties.

==== Matches ====
Win Draw Loss

==== Qualifying Playoff ====
3 April 2023	Rajasthan United	2–2 (a.e.t.) (1–3 p)	NEROCA	Manjeri, Kerala
20:30 IST	R. Gupta (yellow card) 9'; Kharpan 65'; M. Assisi (yellow card) 68'; Lalremsanga 98'	Report	L. Haokip 45+1'; L. Sitlhou (red card) 102'; S. Fernandes 120+3'	Stadium: Payyanad Stadium; Attendance: 1,210; Referee: Pratik Mondal; Man of the Match: Soram Poirei (NEROCA)
	Penalties
	R. Gupta (penalty missed); Neihsial (penalty scored); Amritpal (penalty missed); Horam (penalty missed)		S. Fernandes (penalty scored); P. Singson (penalty scored); L. Rakesh Meitei (penalty missed); J. Singh (penalty scored)

== Squad statistics ==
=== Goal scorers ===
Rank	No.	Pos.	Nat.	Name	I-League	Durand Cup	Baji Rout Cup	Super Cup	Total
1	10	FW	(Uruguay)	Martín Cháves	2	1	2	0	5
2	67	DF	(Kyrgyzstan)	Aidar Mambetaliev	4	0	0	0	4
3	77	MF	(India)	Gyamar Nikum	1	2	0	0	3
3	8	DM	(Kyrgyzstan)	Bektur Amangeldiev	2	1	0	0	3
3	75	FW	(India)	Shaiborlang Kharpan	1	0	1	1	3
5	9	MF	(Uzbekistan)	Otabek Zokirov	2	0	0	0	2
5	29	FW	(India)	Lalremsanga	0	1	0	1	2
5	33	MF	(India)	Britto PM	2	0	0	0	2
5	45	FW	(The Gambia)	Nuha Marong	0	0	2	0	2
5	90	MF	(Spain)	Joseba Beitia	1	0	1	0	2
10	5	DF	(India)	Amritpal Singh	1	0	0	0	1
10	7	FW	(Kyrgyzstan)	Atai Dzhumashev	1	0	0	0	1
10	9	FW	(Lebanon)	Youssef Atriss	0	1	0	0	1
10	20	MF	(India)	Ragav Gupta	0	0	1	0	1
10	23	DF	(India)	Melroy Assisi	1	0	0	0	1
10	-	FW	(Brazil)	Sérgio Barboza	0	1	0	0	1
