= 2022 Durand Cup group stage =

Group stage of 2022 Durand Cup

Tournament details
- Country: India
- Teams: 20

The 2022 IndianOil Durand Cup group stage was played from 16 August to 5 September 2022. A total of 20 teams, consisting of 11 ISL clubs, 5 I-League clubs and 4 Indian Armed Forces teams, competed in the group stage to decide the 8 places in the knockout stage.

== Format ==
In the group stage, each group is played on a single round-robin format. The top two teams advance to the knockout stage.

=== Tiebreakers ===
The teams are ranked according to points (3 points for a win, 1 point for a draw, 0 points for a loss). If tied on points, tiebreakers were applied in the following order:

1. Points in head-to-head matches among tied teams;
2. Goal difference in head-to-head matches among tied teams;
3. Goals scored in head-to-head matches among tied teams;
4. If more than two teams are tied, and after applying all head-to-head criteria above, a subset of teams are still tied, all head-to-head criteria above are reapplied exclusively to this subset of teams;
5. Goal difference in all group matches;
6. Goals scored in all group matches;
7. Drawing of lots.

== Centralised venues ==
On 11 July, Durand Cup Organising Committee announced that for the first time the tournament would be played across more than one city—3 cities—including Kolkata. The other two venues were decided to be Imphal and Guwahati. The four groups were assigned one centralised venue keeping in mind that at least one of the teams in the group must be based from the host city.

- Group A: Kolkata, West Bengal (Vivekananda Yuba Bharati Krirangan and Kishore Bharati Krirangan)
- Group B: Kolkata, West Bengal (Vivekananda Yuba Bharati Krirangan and Kishore Bharati Krirangan)
- Group C: Imphal, Manipur (Khuman Lampak Stadium)
- Group D: Guwahati, Assam (Indira Gandhi Athletic Stadium)

== Groups ==
=== Group A ===
Pos	Team	Pld	W	D	L	GF	GA	GD	Pts	Qualification	MOH	BEN	JAM	GOA	IAF
1	Mohammedan (H)	4	3	1	0	9	2	+7	10	Qualify for the Knockout stage	—	1–1	3–0	3–1	2–0
2	Bengaluru	4	2	2	0	9	4	+5	8	Qualify for the Knockout stage	—	—	2–1	2–2	4–0
3	Jamshedpur	4	2	0	2	4	6	−2	6		—	—	—	1–0	2–1
4	Goa	4	1	1	2	4	6	−2	4		—	—	—	—	1–0
5	Indian Air Force	4	0	0	4	1	9	−8	0		—	—	—	—	—

Source: Sportstar
Rules for classification: 1) points; 2) head-to-head points; 3) head-to-head goal difference; 4) goal difference; 5) number of goals scored; 6) drawing of lots
(H) Hosts

==== Matches ====
16 August 2022 1	Mohammedan	3–1	Goa	Kolkata
19.00 IST	Pritam 49'; Rahman 84'; Davronov (yellow card) 85'; Joseph 90+3'	Report	Nemil 34'; Viegas (yellow card) 44'	Stadium: Vivekananda Yuba Bharati Krirangan; Attendance: 12,857; Referee: C R Srikrishna; Man of the Match: Faslu Rahman (Mohammedan)

17 August 2022 2	Jamshedpur	1–2	Bengaluru	Kolkata
14.30 IST	Thakuri (yellow card) 25'; Angelo (yellow card) 40'; Rishi 61'	Report	Chhetri 23'; Mondal (yellow card) 42' (yellow-red card) 58'; Krishna 56'; Shrivas (yellow card) 86'	Stadium: Kishore Bharati Krirangan; Referee: Rahul Kumar Gupta; Man of the Match: Sunil Chhetri (Bengaluru)

19 August 2022 3	Goa	1–0	Indian Air Force	Kolkata
15.00 IST	Nemil 8'	Report		Stadium: Kishore Bharati Krirangan; Referee: Lakshay Tushir; Man of the Match: Muhammed Nemil (Goa)

21 August 2022 4	Mohammedan	3–0	Jamshedpur	Kolkata
18.00 IST	Rahman 38'; Abhishek 71'; Faiaz 74'	Report		Stadium: Kishore Bharati Krirangan; Referee: Senthil Nathan; Man of the Match: Sairuat Kima (Mohammedan)

23 August 2022 5	Bengaluru	4–0	Indian Air Force	Kolkata
18.00 IST	Krishna 9'; Songliansiam 23' (o.g.); Ramires (yellow card) 61'; Ali 71'; Narayanan 90+3'	Report		Stadium: Kishore Bharati Krirangan; Referee: Surojit Das; Man of the Match: Roy Krishna (Bengaluru)

26 August 2022 6	Jamshedpur	1–0	Goa	Kolkata
18.00 IST	Poojary (yellow card) 45+2'; Hijam (yellow card) 56'; Tapan 84'	Report	Lalremruata (yellow card) 90'	Stadium: Vivekananda Yuba Bharati Krirangan; Referee: C R Srikrishna; Man of the Match: Tapan Halder (Jamshedpur)

27 August 2022 7	Mohammedan	2–0	Indian Air Force	Kolkata
15.00 IST	N'Diaye 33'; Abhishek (yellow card) 65'; Davronov (yellow card) 79'; Pritam (yellow card) 83'; Paswan 87' (yellow card) 87'; Joseph (yellow card) 90+5'	Report	Jerone (yellow card) 7'	Stadium: Kishore Bharati Krirangan; Referee: Senthil Nathan; Man of the Match: Abhash Thapa (Mohammedan)

30 August 2022 8	Bengaluru	2–2	Goa	Kolkata
18.00 IST	Ramires (yellow card) 9'; Chhetri 24'; Narayanan 26'; Udanta (yellow card) 56'	Report	Buam 53'; Rebello 64'	Stadium: Vivekananda Yuba Bharati Krirangan; Referee: Crystal John; Man of the Match: Phrangki Buam (Goa)

1 September 2022 9	Jamshedpur	2–1	Indian Air Force	Kolkata
18.00 IST	Thakuri 26'; Bist (yellow card) 65'; Lalruatmawia 84'	Report	Danish (yellow card) 19'; Somananda 39'	Stadium: Kishore Bharati Krirangan; Referee: Surojit Das; Man of the Match: Lalruatmawia (Jamshedpur)

2 September 2022 10	Mohammedan	1–1	Bengaluru	Kolkata
18.00 IST	Pritam 13' (yellow card) 24'; Vanlalzuidika (yellow card) 27'; Halder (yellow card) 60' (yellow-red card) 73'; Ambekar (yellow card) 61'; N'Diaye (yellow card) 90+2'	Report	Suresh (yellow card) 34'; Kumar (yellow card) 66'; Narayanan 90+1'	Stadium: Vivekananda Yuba Bharati Krirangan; Referee: C R Srikrishna; Man of the Match: Shaher Shaheen (Mohammedan)

=== Group B ===
Pos	Team	Pld	W	D	L	GF	GA	GD	Pts	Qualification	MCI	RUN	AMB	EAB	INA
1	Mumbai City	4	2	1	1	13	7	+6	7 (Note: Head-to-head points: Mumbai City 4, Rajasthan United 3, Mohun Bagan 1.)	Qualify for the Knockout stage	—	5–1	—	—	4–1
2	Rajasthan United	4	2	1	1	6	7	−1	7	Qualify for the Knockout stage	—	—	—	—	2–0
3	Mohun Bagan (H)	4	2	1	1	6	4	+2	7		1–1	2–3	—	—	2–0
4	East Bengal (H)	4	1	2	1	4	4	0	5		4–3	0–0	0–1	—	0–0
5	Indian Navy	4	0	1	3	1	8	−7	1		—	—	—	—	—

Source: Sportstar
Rules for classification: 1) points; 2) head-to-head points; 3) head-to-head goal difference; 4) goal difference; 5) number of goals scored; 6) drawing of lots
(H) Hosts

==== Matches ====
18 August 2022 1	Mumbai City	4–1	Indian Navy	Kolkata
15.00 IST	Vikram 45+4'; Stewart 65' (pen.); Griffiths (yellow card) 88'; Chhangte 89', 90+1'	Report	Sreyas (yellow card) 40'; Mattummal 43'	Stadium: Vivekananda Yuba Bharati Krirangan; Referee: Senthil Nathan; Man of the Match: Lallianzuala Chhangte (Mumbai City)

20 August 2022 2	Mohun Bagan	2–3	Rajasthan United	Kolkata
18.00 IST	Hnamte (yellow card) 41'; Nassiri 43'; Kuruniyan 46'; Rathi (yellow card) 56'	Report	Amangeldiev 45+1'; Fanai 61'; Nikum 90+5' (yellow card) 90+5'	Stadium: Vivekananda Yuba Bharati Krirangan; Referee: Crystal John; Man of the Match: Niraj Kumar (Rajasthan United)

22 August 2022 3	East Bengal	0–0	Indian Navy	Kolkata
18.00 IST	Mukherjee (yellow card) 62'	Report	Mahata (yellow card) 60'	Stadium: Vivekananda Yuba Bharati Krirangan; Referee: Lakshay Tushir; Man of the Match: Harikrishna AU (Indian Navy)

24 August 2022 4	Mohun Bagan	1–1	Mumbai City	Kolkata
18.00 IST	Colaco 40'; Boumous (yellow card) 61'	Report	Ranawade (yellow card) 37'; Jahouh (yellow card) 61'; Díaz 77'	Stadium: Vivekananda Yuba Bharati Krirangan; Referee: Rahul Kumar Gupta; Man of the Match: Liston Colaco (Mohun Bagan)

25 August 2022 5	East Bengal	0–0	Rajasthan United	Kolkata
18.00 IST	Lima (yellow card) 59'; González (yellow card) 79'; Rahman (yellow card) 90+5'	Report	Mambetaliev (yellow card) 13'; Amangeldiev (yellow card) 53'	Stadium: Kishore Bharati Krirangan; Referee: Crystal John; Man of the Match: Melroy Melwin Assisi (Rajasthan United)

28 August 2022 6	East Bengal	0–1	Mohun Bagan	Kolkata
18:00 IST	González (yellow card) 90+1'	Report	Boumous (yellow card) 39'; McHugh (yellow card) 44'; Passi 45+2' (o.g.); Rai (yellow card) 47'; Manvir (yellow card) 79'	Stadium: Vivekananda Yuba Bharati Krirangan; Referee: C R Srikrishna; Man of the Match: Carl McHugh (Mohun Bagan)

29 August 2022 7	Mumbai City	5–1	Rajasthan United	Kolkata
15.00 IST	Stewart 10'; Chhangte 18'; Mehtab 36' (yellow card) 84'; Jahouh 63'; Stalin (yellow card) 69'; Vikram 90+2'	Report	Assisi (yellow card) 48'; Nikum 67'; Atriss (yellow card) 83'	Stadium: Kishore Bharati Krirangan; Referee: Rahul Kumar Gupta; Man of the Match: Ahmed Jahouh (Mumbai City)

31 August 2022 8	Mohun Bagan	2–0	Indian Navy	Kolkata
18.00 IST	Rodrigues 18'; Nassiri 28'; Tangri (yellow card) 39'; Rana (yellow card) 68'; Suryavanshi (yellow card) 90+1'	Report		Stadium: Kishore Bharati Krirangan; Referee: Lakshay Tushir; Man of the Match: Lenny Rodrigues (Mohun Bagan)

3 September 2022 9	East Bengal	4–3	Mumbai City	Kolkata
18.00 IST	Passi 17', 34'; Silva 22', 81'; Chakrabarti (yellow card) 45'; Singh (yellow card) 60'	Report	Stewart 27' (yellow card) 7'; Gill (yellow card) 7'; Chhangte 36', 43'; Bipin (yellow card) 58'; Nawaz (yellow card) 87'; Noguera (yellow card) 90'	Stadium: Kishore Bharati Krirangan; Referee: Rahul Kumar Gupta; Man of the Match: Cleiton Silva (East Bengal)

5 September 2022 10	Rajasthan United	2–0	Indian Navy	Kolkata
15.00 IST	Atriss 73'; Barboza 89' (yellow card) 89'	Report	Thapa (yellow card) 59'	Stadium: Kishore Bharati Krirangan; Referee: Lakshay Tushir; Man of the Match: Martín Cháves (Rajasthan United)

=== Group C ===
Pos	Team	Pld	W	D	L	GF	GA	GD	Pts	Qualification	HYD	CHE	ARR	NER	TRA
1	Hyderabad	4	3	0	1	8	2	+6	9	Qualify for the Knockout stage	—	3–1	—	—	—
2	Chennaiyin	4	2	1	1	9	6	+3	7	Qualify for the Knockout stage	—	—	2–2	—	—
3	Army Red	4	1	2	1	4	4	0	5		1–0	—	—	0–0	—
4	NEROCA (H)	4	1	1	2	3	6	−3	4		0–3	0–2	—	—	3–1
5	TRAU (H)	4	1	0	3	4	10	−6	3		0–2	1–4	2–1	—	—

Source: Sportstar
Rules for classification: 1) points; 2) head-to-head points; 3) head-to-head goal difference; 4) goal difference; 5) number of goals scored; 6) drawing of lots
(H) Hosts

==== Matches ====
18 August 2022 1	NEROCA	3–1	TRAU	Imphal
18.00 IST	Ragui 16'; Shimray 36'; Chidi 50'; James (yellow card) 71'	Report	Tursunov 19'; Samte (yellow card) 35'	Stadium: Khuman Lampak Stadium; Referee: Umesh Bora; Man of the Match: Naorem Tondomba Singh (NEROCA)

20 August 2022 2	Chennaiyin	2–2	Army Red	Imphal
15.00 IST	Düker 89'; Vanspaul 90+4'	Report	Khongsai 54'; Shil 90+6' (yellow card) 90+7'	Stadium: Khuman Lampak Stadium; Referee: Aditya Purkayastha; Man of the Match: Suresh Meitei (Army Red)

22 August 2022 3	TRAU	0–2	Hyderabad	Imphal
15.00 IST	Singh (yellow card) 60'; Johnson (yellow card) 67'	Report	D'Silva (yellow card) 9'; Jongte (yellow card) 11'; Narzary 27'; Herrera 53'; Sana (yellow card) 55'	Stadium: Khuman Lampak Stadium; Referee: Pratik Mondal; Man of the Match: Hitesh Sharma (Hyderabad)

24 August 2022 4	Army Red	0–0	NEROCA	Imphal
15.00 IST	Sunil (yellow card) 17'; Shafeel (yellow card) 68'	Report		Stadium: Khuman Lampak Stadium; Referee: Umesh Bora; Man of the Match: Soram Poirei (NEROCA)

26 August 2022 5	Hyderabad	3–1	Chennaiyin	Imphal
15.00 IST	Yasir (yellow card) 39'; Victor 56' (pen.); Ogbeche 64', 74'	Report	Bag (yellow card) 35'; Thapa 42'; Diagne (red card) 54'	Stadium: Khuman Lampak Stadium; Referee: Rowan Arumughan; Man of the Match: João Victor (Hyderabad)

28 August 2022 6	TRAU	2–1	Army Red	Imphal
15.00 IST	Bodo 81'; Milan 90'; Joysana (yellow card) 90+2'	Report	Shil 35'; Kamei (yellow card) 58'	Stadium: Khuman Lampak Stadium; Referee: Pratik Mondal; Man of the Match: Baoringdao Bodo (TRAU)

30 August 2022 7	NEROCA	0–3	Hyderabad	Imphal
15.00 IST		Report	Chianese 3'; Ogbeche 17', 82'	Stadium: Khuman Lampak Stadium; Referee: Aditya Purkayastha; Man of the Match: Hitesh Sharma (Hyderabad)

1 September 2022 8	TRAU	1–4	Chennaiyin	Imphal
18.00 IST	Roshan (yellow card) 24'; Salam (yellow card) 36' (red card) 36'; Tursunov 45' (pen.)	Report	Slišković 1', 55'; Karikari 19' (pen.); Hakhamaneshi 51'	Stadium: Khuman Lampak Stadium; Referee: Rowan Arumughan; Man of the Match: Julius Düker (Chennaiyin)

3 September 2022 9	Army Red	1–0	Hyderabad	Imphal
15.00 IST	Meitei 33'; Sunil (yellow card) 37'	Report	Mohammed (yellow card) 32'; Victor (yellow card) 90+10'	Stadium: Khuman Lampak Stadium; Referee: Umesh Bora; Man of the Match: Bhabindra Malla Thakuri (Army Red)

5 September 2022 10	NEROCA	0–2	Chennaiyin	Imphal
18.00 IST	Reamsochung (yellow card) 37'; Rakesh (yellow card) 70'; Simbo (yellow card) 77'	Report	Thapa 15'; Hakhamaneshi 71'	Stadium: Khuman Lampak Stadium; Referee: Pratik Mondal; Man of the Match: Anirudh Thapa (Chennaiyin)

=== Group D ===
Pos	Team	Pld	W	D	L	GF	GA	GD	Pts	Qualification	ODI	KER	ARG	NEU	SDE
1	Odisha	4	4	0	0	11	0	+11	12	Qualify for the Knockout stage	—	2–0	—	6–0	3–0
2	Kerala Blasters	4	2	1	1	6	3	+3	7	Qualify for the Knockout stage	—	—	2–0	—	—
3	Army Green	4	1	1	2	3	4	−1	4		0–1	—	—	—	0–0
4	NorthEast United (H)	4	1	0	3	3	12	−9	3		0–6	0–3	1–3	—	2–0
5	Sudeva Delhi	4	0	2	2	1	6	−5	2		—	1–1	—	—	—

Source: Sportstar
Rules for classification: 1) points; 2) head-to-head points; 3) head-to-head goal difference; 4) goal difference; 5) number of goals scored; 6) drawing of lots
(H) Hosts

==== Matches ====
17 August 2022 1	NorthEast United	0–6	Odisha	Guwahati
17.30 IST		Report	Jerry 14', 38'; Sekar 26'; Panwar (yellow card) 34'; Isak 81'; Maurício 88'; Thoiba 90+1'	Stadium: Indira Gandhi Athletic Stadium; Referee: Pranjal Banerjee; Man of the Match: Jerry Mawihmingthanga (Odisha)

19 August 2022 2	Sudeva Delhi	1–1	Kerala Blasters	Guwahati
18.00 IST	Kuki 45' (yellow card) 79'; Bhat (yellow card) 85'	Report	Krishna (yellow card) 37'; Ajsal 42'; Jasim (yellow card) 70'	Stadium: Indira Gandhi Athletic Stadium; Referee: Priyobarta Singh; Man of the Match: Mangku Kuki (Sudeva Delhi)

21 August 2022 3	NorthEast United	1–3	Army Green	Guwahati
15.00 IST	Mirdha 90+1'	Report	Lallawmkima 9', 55' (yellow card) 45+3'; Kothari 24'; Varghese (yellow card) 46'	Stadium: Indira Gandhi Athletic Stadium; Referee: Dipu Roy; Man of the Match: PC Lallawmkima (Army Green)

23 August 2022 4	Odisha	2–0	Kerala Blasters	Guwahati
15.00 IST	Isaac 51'; Saúl 74'	Report	Azhar (yellow card) 66'	Stadium: Indira Gandhi Athletic Stadium; Referee: Ashwin Kanojiya; Man of the Match: Thoiba Singh (Odisha)

25 August 2022 5	Army Green	0–0	Sudeva Delhi	Guwahati
15.00 IST		Report	Lawmnasangzuala (yellow card) 68'; Bhat (yellow card) 90'	Stadium: Indira Gandhi Athletic Stadium; Referee: Priyobarta Singh; Man of the Match: Oinam Gautham Singh (Army Green)

27 August 2022 6	NorthEast United	0–3	Kerala Blasters	Guwahati
18.00 IST	Boro (yellow card) 35'; Gogoi (yellow card) 62'	Report	Aimen 28', 90'; Ajsal 55'; Kankonkar (yellow card) 66'; Gigi (yellow card) 81'	Stadium: Indira Gandhi Athletic Stadium; Referee: Pranjal Banerjee; Man of the Match: Mohammed Aimen (Kerala Blasters)

29 August 2022 7	Odisha	3–0	Sudeva Delhi	Guwahati
18.00 IST	Saúl 19', 38'; Jerry 40'; Thoiba (yellow card) 71'	Report	Darjee (yellow card) 18'; Nurain (yellow card) 80'	Stadium: Indira Gandhi Athletic Stadium; Referee: Dipu Roy; Man of the Match: Saúl Crespo (Odisha)

31 August 2022 8	Kerala Blasters	2–0	Army Green	Guwahati
15.00 IST	Aimen 25'; Das 45+3'; Mohanan (yellow card) 81'	Report	Chhetri (yellow card) 17'; Lallawmkima (yellow card) 41'	Stadium: Indira Gandhi Athletic Stadium; Referee: Priyobarta Singh; Man of the Match: Mohammed Aimen

2 September 2022 9	NorthEast United	2–0	Sudeva Delhi	Guwahati
15.00 IST	Boro (yellow card) 31'; Mirdha 64'; Nigam 90+6'	Report		Stadium: Indira Gandhi Athletic Stadium; Referee: Ashwin Mohanlal Kanojiya; Man of the Match: Dipu Mirdha (NorthEast United)

4 September 2022 10	Army Green	0–1	Odisha	Guwahati
18.00 IST	Nitin (yellow card) 45+1'	Report	Martín 83'	Stadium: Indira Gandhi Athletic Stadium; Referee: Pranjal Banerjee; Man of the Match: Raynier Fernandes (Odisha)
