= 2020–21 TRAU FC season =

2020–21 football season for TRAU Football Club

TRAU FC
2020–21 season
- Head coach: L. Nandakumar Singh
- I-League: 3rd
- AIFF Super Cup: Cancelled
- Top goalscorer: League: Bidyashagar Singh (12 goals); All: Bidyashagar Singh (12 goals)
- Average home league attendance: Closed Door

The 2020–21 season was the 66th season of TRAU FC in existence and second season in the I-League. The club finished their second I-League season at the 3rd position with 26 points.

Trau FC's top goal scorer was Bidyashagar Singh with 12 goals from 15 matches.

== Squad ==
As of 15 January 2021

Note: Flags indicate national team as defined under FIFA eligibility rules; some limited exceptions apply. Players may hold more than one non-FIFA nationality.

No.	Pos.	Nation	Player
1	GK	IND	Soram Anganba
2	DF	IND	Shouvik Ghosh
4	DF	BRA	Helder Lobato
5	DF	IND	Soraisham Dinesh Singh
6	MF	IND	Phalguni Konsam (Captain)
7	FW	TJK	Komron Tursunov (Vice Captain)
45	MF	BRA	Bruno Rodrigues
8	MF	IND	Shougrakpam Netrajit Singh
9	FW	IND	Mayosing Khongreiwa
10	FW	IND	Seiminmang Manchong
11	FW	IND	Bidyashagar Singh
12	MF	IND	Chongtham Kishan
14	DF	IND	Abhishek Das
15	DF	IND	Md.Abdul Salam
16	MF	IND	Sapam Bishorjit
17	FW	IND	Robinson
18	FW	IND	Bedashwor Singh
19	DF	IND	Naresh Singh
20	MF	IND	Cleaven Hmar

No.	Pos.	Nation	Player
21	FW	NGR	Joseph Olaleye
22	DF	IND	James
23	GK	IND	H.Prasanjit Singh
24	MF	IND	Prikanta Sorokhaibam
25	FW	IND	Tjuddin
26	FW	IND	Fayajuddin
27	MF	IND	Vicky Meitei
28	FW	IND	Ningthoujam Olen
29	MF	IND	Yuno Richard Thaikho
30	DF	IND	Amit Tudu
32	MF	IND	Laishram Milan Singh
34	FW	IND	Khundongbam Krishnanda
35	DF	IND	Shahbaaz Khan
36	MF	IND	Meitalkeishangbam Roger
37	MF	IND	Chanso Horam
38	DF	IND	Herojit
41	GK	IND	Amrit Gope

== Current technical staff ==
As of 15 March 2020.

Position	Name
Head Coach	(India) L.Nandakumar Singh
Assistant Coach	(India) KH Surmani
Goalkeeping Coach	(India) Joykumar

== Competitions ==
Win Draw Loss

Competition	First match	Last match	Starting round	Record							
Competition	First match	Last match	Starting round	Pld	W	D	L	GF	GA	GD	Win %
I-League	10 January 2021	29 March 2021	Matchday 1	15	7	5	3	26	20	+6	46.67
Super Cup	2021	2021	cancelled	0	0	0	0	0	0	+0	—
Total				15	7	5	3	26	20	+6	46.67

Last updated: 30 March 2021.
Source: Competitions

=== I-League ===
==== League table ====
Pos	Team	Pld	W	D	L	GF	GA	GD	Pts	Qualification or relegation
3	Real Kashmir	10	4	5	1	18	9	+9	17	Promote to Championship Stage (Group A)
4	Gokulam Kerala	10	5	1	4	20	14	+6	16	Promote to Championship Stage (Group A)
5	TRAU	10	4	4	2	17	13	+4	16	Promote to Championship Stage (Group A)
6	Mohammedan	10	4	4	2	9	8	+1	16	Promote to Championship Stage (Group A)
7	Aizawl	10	4	3	3	13	8	+5	15	Demote to Relegation Stage (Group B)

Source: I-League
Rules for classification: 1) points; 2) head-to-head points; 3) head-to-head goal difference; 4) goal difference; 5) number of goals scored; 6) drawing of lots

==== League Results by round ====
Round	1	2	3	4	5	6	7	8	9	10
Result	D	D	D	W	D	L	W	L	W	W
League Position	6	8	7	2	2	8	5	6	6	5

Updated to match(es) played on 2 March 2021. Source: Matchday
W = Win; D = Draw; L = Loss

=== League Matchdays ===
10 January 2021 1	Real Kashmir	1–1	TRAU	Kolkata
14:00 IST	Mason Robertson 70'	Report	Komron Tursunov 1'	Stadium: Mohun Bagan Ground; Attendance: 0 Man of the Match: Helder Lobato Ribeiro (TRAU)

15 January 2021 2	NEROCA FC	1–1	TRAU	Kolkata
19:00 IST	Varun Thokchom 10'	Report	Joseph Olaleye 15'	Stadium: Kalyani Stadium; Attendance: 0 Man of the Match: YJiteshwor Singh (NEROCA)

15 January 2021 3	TRAU	1–1	Mohammedan SC	Kolkata
16:05 IST	Komron Tursunov 2'; Ribeiro 45+3'	Report	Nikhil Kadam 58'; Hira Mondal 68'	Stadium: Kalyani Stadium; Attendance: 0 Man of the Match: Komron Tursunov (TRAU)

24 January 2021 4	TRAU	2–0	Chennai City	Kolkata
14:00 IST	Elvedin Škrijelj 49' (o.g.); Bidyashagar Singh 69'	Report		Stadium: Salt Lake Stadium; Attendance: 0 Man of the Match: Bidyashagar Singh (TRAU)

29 January 2021 5	Churchill Brothers	1–1	TRAU FC	Kolkata
19:00 IST	Bidyashagar Singh 23'	Report	Clayvin Zuniga 19'	Stadium: Kalyani Stadium; Attendance: 0 Man of the Match: Bidyashagar Singh (TRAU)

4 February 2021 6	TRAU	0–2	Punjab FC	Kolkata
19:00 IST		Report	Chencho Gyeltshen 42', 64'	Stadium: Kalyani Stadium; Attendance: 0 Man of the Match: Chencho Gyeltshen (Punjab)

9 February 2021 7	TRAU	1–0	Aizawal FC	Kolkata
19:00 IST	Komron Tursunov 5'	Report		Stadium: Kalyani Stadium; Attendance: 0 Man of the Match: Amrit Gope (TRAU)

13 February 2021 8	TRAU	1–3	Gokulam Kerala	Kolkata
14:00 IST	Komron Tursunov 88'	Report	Emil Benny 16'; Sharif Mukhammad 57'; Zodingliana 86'	Stadium: Kishore Bharati Krirangan; Attendance: 0 Man of the Match: Emil Benny (GKFC)

28 February 2021 9	Indian Arrows	1–5	TRAU	Kolkata
16:05 IST	Harsh Patre 42'	Report	Bidyashagar Singh 14', 50'; Khongreiwoshi 15'; Komron 74'; Chanso Horam 86'	Stadium: Kalyani Stadium; Attendance: 0 Man of the Match: Komron Tursunov (TRAU)

28 February 2021 10	Sudeva Delhi	2–3	TRAU	Kolkata
19:15 IST	William 17'; Shubho Paul 41'	Report	Bidyashagar Singh 36'; Phalguni Singh 55'; Joseph Olaleye 82'	Stadium: Kalyani Stadium; Attendance: 0 Man of the Match: Phalguni Singh (TRAU)

=== Championship Stage (Group A) ===
Pos	Team	Pld	W	D	L	GF	GA	GD	Pts	Qualification
1	Churchill Brothers	11	7	4	0	17	7	+10	25	Champions and Qualification for 2022 AFC Cup group stage
2	TRAU	11	5	4	2	21	13	+8	19	
3	Gokulam Kerala	11	6	1	4	21	14	+7	19	
4	Punjab	11	5	3	3	12	8	+4	18	
5	Real Kashmir	11	4	5	2	19	11	+8	17	
6	Mohammedan	11	4	4	3	9	12	−3	16	

Updated to match(es) played on unknown. Source: I-League
Rules for classification: 1) points; 2) head-to-head points; 3) head-to-head goal difference; 4) goal difference; 5) number of goals scored; 6) drawing of lots

5 March 2021 1	Mohammedan SC	0–4	Trau	kolkata
16:05 ist		Report	Phalguni Singh 29'; Bidyashagar Singh 39', 42', 65'	Stadium: Kalyani Stadium; Attendance: 0 Man of the Match: Bidyashagar Singh (Trau)

10 March 2021 2	Real Kashmir	1–3	Trau	kolkata
16:05 ist	Danish Farooq 24'	Report	Bidyashagar Singh 8', 37', 85'	Stadium: Kalyani Stadium; Attendance: 0 Man of the Match: Bidyashagar Singh (Trau)

15 March 2021 3	Trau	1–0	Punjab FC	kolkata
16:05 ist	Komron Tursunov 81'	Report	Mohammed Irshad (red card) 78'	Stadium: Kalyani Stadium; Attendance: 0 Man of the Match: Komron Tursunov (Trau)

21 March 2021 4	Trau	1–1	Churchill Brothers	Kolkata
14:00 IST	Phalguni Singh 43'	Report	Luka Majcen 28'	Stadium: Kishore Bharati Krirangan; Attendance: 0 Man of the Match: Phalguni Singh (Trau)

27 March 2021 5	Gokulam Kerala	4–1	Trau	Kolkata
17:00 IST	Sharif Mukhammad 70'; Emil Benny 74'; Denny Antwi 77'; Muhammed Rashid 90+8'	Report	Bidyashagar Singh 23'	Stadium: Kishore Bharati Krirangan; Attendance: 0 Man of the Match: Emil Benny (GKFC)
