= Gyamar Nikum =

Indian football player

Personal information
- Date of birth: 26 October 2004 (age 22)
- Place of birth: Naharlagun, Arunachal Pradesh, India
- Height: 1.67 m (5 ft 6 in)
- Position: Midfielder

Team information
- Current team: Gokulam Kerala

Youth career
- 2019–2020: Arunachal Pradesh
- 2020–2021: Rajasthan United
- 2023–2025: Mumbai City B

Senior career*
| Years | Team | Apps | (Gls) |
| 2021–2023 | Rajasthan United | 18 | (1) |
| 2023–2026 | Mumbai City | 6 | (0) |
| 2023–2024 | → Inter Kashi (loan) | 22 | (4) |
| 2026– | Gokulam Kerala | 0 | (0) |
- * Club domestic league appearances and goals as of 5:50, 1 October 2026 (UTC)

Gyamar Nikum (born 26 October 2004) is an Indian professional footballer who plays as a midfielder for Indian Football League club Gokulam Kerala.

He is one of the youngest players and first from Arunachal Pradesh in history to be selected and debut in the I-League Qualifiers, at an age of 16 years and 359 days.

== Club career ==
=== Youth career ===
Hailing from the town of Naharlagun in Arunachal Pradesh's Papum Pare district, Nikum started playing football at the age of 8. By the age of 14, he had played in the U15 sub-junior national championships for Arunachal Pradesh.

On 2019, Nikum achieved a career milestone when he was selected for the Arunachal Pradesh team to play in the U18 BC Roy Trophy, where they made it to the semi-finals. It was in that tournament where the midfielder was scouted by Rajasthan United and offered a chance to be a part of their residential academy in Bhilwara. After impressing then coach Vikrant Sharma, he was fast tracked to the first-team squad.

=== Rajasthan United ===
On 20 October 2021, Nikum became one of the youngest players and first from Arunachal Pradesh in history to be selected and debut in the I-League Qualifiers, when he appeared against Madan Maharaj, at an age of 16 years and 359 days.

Nikum had a breakout 2021–22 season, where he appeared in fourteen of their eighteen games as Rajasthan United had a memorable debut season in the I-League, finishing in the top 7 of Phase 1 and qualifying for the Championship stage.

In July 2022, Nikum signed a new four-year contract extension with Rajasthan United. On 20 August, he scored his first and the winning goal for the club in a shock 3–2 win over ATK Mohun Bagan, in the Durand Cup.

=== Mumbai City ===
On 22 January 2023, 18 year-old Nikum joined Mumbai City for a reported transfer fee of ₹6–7.5 million on a four-and-a-half-year contract, with an option to extend further. The transfer fee is a record for a player of his age.

On 1 October 2026, Mumbai City announced they had mutually terminated Nikum's contract.

==== Inter Kashi (loan) ====
On 3 September 2023, I-League club Inter Kashi announced the signing of Nikum on a one-year loan deal, until the end of the 2023–24 I-League season. Following a season of 22 appearances, four goals, and four assists, Nikum was adjudged to be the Best Emerging Player of the season.

== International career ==
In June 2022, Nikum got called up by the AIFF for the India U20 training camp in Bhubaneswar, Odisha.

== Career statistics ==
=== Club ===
As of 19 February 2022

| Club | Season | League | | | Cup | | AFC | | Total | |
| Club | Season | Division | Apps | Goals | Apps | Goals | Apps | Goals | Apps | Goals |
|---|---|---|---|---|---|---|---|---|---|---|
| Rajasthan United | 2021 | I-League 2nd Division | 1 | 0 | 0 | 0 | – | | 1 | 0 |
| Rajasthan United | 2021–22 | I-League | 14 | 0 | 0 | 0 | – | | 14 | 0 |
| Rajasthan United | 2022–23 | I-League | 4 | 1 | 5 (Note: Appearance(s) in Durand Cup) | 2 | – | | 9 | 3 |
| Rajasthan United | Total | | 19 | 1 | 5 | 2 | 0 | 0 | 24 | 3 |
| Mumbai City | 2022–23 | Indian Super League | 1 | 0 | 0 | 0 | – | | 1 | 0 |
| Inter Kashi (loan) | 2023–24 | I-League | 0 | 0 | 0 | 0 | – | | 0 | 0 |
| Career total | | | 20 | 1 | 5 | 2 | 0 | 0 | 25 | 3 |

== Honours ==
Mumbai City

- Indian Super League premiership : 2022–23
