= Bektur Amangeldiyev =

Kyrgyz footballer (born 1998)

Personal information
- Full name: Bektur Amangeldiyevich Amangeldiyev
- Date of birth: 20 November 1998 (age 27)
- Place of birth: Bishkek, Kyrgyzstan
- Height: 1.85 m (6 ft 1 in)
- Position: Midfielder

Youth career
- –2016: Dinamo-Manas
- 2016–2018: Abdysh-Ata Kant

Senior career*
Years	Team	Apps	(Gls)
2018–2019	Ilbirs Bishkek		
2019–2020	Kaganat		
2019	→ Alga Bishkek (loan)	8	(0)
2020–2021	Abdysh-Ata Kant	11	(1)
2021–2022	Kaganat	14	(1)
2022	Dordoi Bishkek	5	(0)
2022–2023	Rajasthan United	15	(2)
2023–2024	Nagaworld	23	(2)
2024–2025	Talant	8	(0)
2025	Rajasthan United	13	(2)
- * Club domestic league appearances and goals as of 23:32, 6 April 2025 (UTC)

Bektur Amangeldiyevich Amangeldiyev (Kyrgyz: Бектур Амангелдиев; Russian: Бектур Амангелдиевич Амангелдиев; born 20 November 1998) is a Kyrgyz professional footballer who plays as a midfielder.

== Club career ==
=== Early career ===
Amangeldiyev started his football career at Dinamo-Manas. In 2016, he made a move to Abdysh-Ata Kant II. After spending two years at the club, he shifted base to Ilbirs Bishkek. The following year saw the midfielder join Kaganat. The player's then piled his trade with Dordoi Bishkek in January, 2022.

Amangeldiyev played 37 matches, until 2022, in the Kyrgyz Premier League. In the process, he has also netted two goals. Also, despite being a midfielder, the 23-year-old can pitch in as a centre-back at times.

=== Rajasthan United ===
In August 2022, Amangeldiyev moved abroad for the first time and signed with I-League club Rajasthan United, on a one-year deal. On 20 August, he scored on his debut in a shock 3–2 win over ATK Mohun Bagan, in the Durand Cup.

He left Rajasthan in 2023 for Nagaworld FC in Combodian Premier league.

He returned to his home country to play for FC Talant in 2024

In January 2025, Rajasthan United signed him again in winter window.

== Career statistics ==
=== Club ===
As of 6 April 2025

Club	Season	League			Cup		Continental		Total	
Club	Season	Division	Apps	Goals	Apps	Goals	Apps	Goals	Apps	Goals
Alga Bishkek (loan)	2019	Kyrgyz Premier League	8	0	0	0	—		8	0
Abdysh-Ata Kant	2020	Kyrgyz Premier League	7	1	0	0	—		7	1
Abdysh-Ata Kant	2021	Kyrgyz Premier League	4	0	0	0	—		4	0
Abdysh-Ata Kant	Total		11	1	0	0	0	0	11	1
Kaganat	2021	Kyrgyz Premier League	13	1	0	0	—		13	1
Dordoi Bishkek	2022	Kyrgyz Premier League	5	0	0	0	—		5	0
Rajasthan United	2022–23	I-League	15	2	5 (Note: Appearance(s) in Durand Cup)	1	–		20	3
Nagaworld	2023–24	Cambodian Premier League	23	2	0	0	—		23	2
Talant	2024	Kyrgyz Premier League	8	0	2 (Note: Appearance(s) in Kyrgyzstan Cup)	0	—		10	0
Rajasthan United	2024–25	I-League	13	2	0	0	—		13	2
Career total			96	8	7	1	0	0	103	9

== Honours ==
Rajasthan United

- Baji Rout Cup: 2022
