= 2021–22 Rajasthan United FC season =

8th season in existence of Kerala Blasters FC

Rajasthan United FC
2021–22 season
- Head Coach: (Spain) Francesc Bonet
- I-League: TBD

The 2021–22 season is the fourth season in Rajasthan United FC's existence, and their 1st season in I-League.

== First team squad ==
Squad no.	Name	Nationality	Position(s)	Age	Previous club	Since	Apps	Goals
Goalkeepers
01	Vishal Joon	(India)	GK	28	(India) Friends United	2021	9	0
22	Bhaskar Roy	(India)	GK	28	(India) Indian Navy			
25	Yasheel Shah	(India)	GK	26	(India) PIFA Sports FC			
32	Dibyendu Sarkar	(India)	GK	35				
Defenders
17	Anil Chawan	(India)	CB	22	(India) SC East Bengal			
24	Prashant Choudhary	(India)	CB	27	(India) Sudeva Delhi FC			
2	Gurmukh Singh	(India)	RB	23	(India) Garhwal FC			
16	Puneet Chadda	(India)	LB	27	(India) Rajasthan Perfect FC			
29	Shreyansh Choudhary	(India)	LB	20	(India) Rajasthan Perfect FC			
4	Tarif Akhand	(India)	CB	23	(India) Kenkre FC			
27	Abhishek Ambekar	(India)	LB	30	(India) Sudeva Delhi FC			
13	Akashdeep Singh Kahlon	(India)	RB	28	(India) SC East Bengal			
3	Pawan Joshi	(India)	RB	26	(India) Hindustan FC			
93	Hardik Bhatt	(India)	RB	24	(India) Hyderya Sports FC			
MidFielders
8	Akeem Abioye	(Nigeria)	DM	23	(India) Rangers SC			
39	Varad Ayare	(India)	CM	20	(India) Iron Born SC			
21	Alocious M	(India)	CM	23	(India) Calcutta Customs			
28	Harmanjot Singh	(India)	CM	25				
77	Gyamar Nikum	(India)	AM	17	Rajasthan United Academy			
5	Fabiano Alves	(Brazil)	DM	27	(Slovakia) FC Nitra			
23	Melroy Assisi	(India)	CM	23	(India) Chennaiyin FC			
40	Ningthoujam Pritam Singh	(India)	RM	28	(India) RoundGlass Punjab FC			
31	Shilton D'Silva	(India)	AM	29	(India) Mohammedan SC			
	Omar Ramos	(Spain)						
Forwards
7	Aman Thapa							
33	Sauma Das							
21	Alocious M							
	Dilliram Sanyasi	(India)	RW	26	East Bengal II			
91	Pedro Manzi	(Spain)	CF	33	Bengaluru United			

== Transfers and loans ==
=== Loans out ===
No	Position	Player	Loaned to	Fee	Date	On loan until	Source
10	FW	(Brazil) Marcelinho	NorthEast United	None	6 January 2022	End of Season	

== Current technical staff ==
Current technical staff (as of 16 December 2021)
Position	Name
CEO	(India) Dinesh Negi
Team manager	(India) Gabriel B Gomes
Technical director	(India) Vikrant Sharma (India) Magan Singh Rajvi
Head coach	(Spain) Fransesc Bonet
Assistant coach	(India) Pushpender Kundu
U-18 Coach	(India) Himanshu Bisht
Physio	(India) Dr.Varun Khergamker

== Competition ==
=== I-League 2nd Division ===
Pos	Team	Pld	W	D	L	GF	GA	GD	Pts	Qualification
1	Rajasthan United	3	1	2	0	5	4	+1	5	Qualified for Finals
2	Madan Maharaj	3	1	2	0	5	4	+1	5	Qualified for Finals
3	Ryntih	3	1	0	2	4	4	0	3	
4	Bengaluru United	3	0	2	1	4	6	−2	2	

Source: AIFF

Pos	Team	Pld	W	D	L	GF	GA	GD	Pts	Qualification
1	Delhi	4	4	0	0	11	2	+9	12	Qualified for Finals
2	Kenkre	4	2	1	1	4	3	+1	7	Qualified for Finals
3	Kerala United	4	2	0	2	7	5	+2	6	
4	Corbett	4	0	2	2	2	8	−6	2	
5	ARA	4	0	1	3	3	9	−6	1	

Source: AIFF

Pos	Team	Pld	W	D	L	GF	GA	GD	Pts	Qualification
1	Rajasthan United (C)	3	2	1	0	3	0	+3	7	Promotion to 2021–22 I-League
2	Kenkre	3	1	2	0	2	1	+1	5	Promotion to 2021–22 I-League
3	Delhi	3	1	1	1	7	2	+5	4	
4	Madan Maharaj	3	0	0	3	0	9	−9	0	

Source: AIFF
(C) Champions

=== I-League ===
==== League table ====
Pos	Team	Pld	W	D	L	GF	GA	GD	Pts	Qualification
5	Churchill Brothers	12	6	2	4	16	15	+1	20	Championship stage
6	NEROCA	12	4	6	2	17	16	+1	18	Championship stage
7	Rajasthan United	12	3	7	2	10	8	+2	16	Championship stage
8	Real Kashmir	12	2	7	3	18	22	−4	13	Relegation stage
9	TRAU	12	3	3	6	12	15	−3	12	Relegation stage

Source: Hero I-League
Rules for classification: 1) points; 2) head-to-head points; 3) head-to-head goal difference; 4) goal difference; 5) number of goals scored; 6) drawing of lots

Pos	Team	Pld	W	D	L	GF	GA	GD	Pts
3	Sreenidi Deccan	18	9	5	4	27	19	+8	32
4	Churchill Brothers	18	9	3	6	24	22	+2	30
5	RoundGlass Punjab	18	8	4	6	33	29	+4	28
6	Rajasthan United	18	5	7	6	16	16	0	22
7	NEROCA	18	4	8	6	21	30	−9	20

Source: Hero I-League
Rules for classification: 1) points; 2) head-to-head points; 3) head-to-head goal difference; 4) goal difference; 5) number of goals scored; 6) drawing of lots

Pos	Team	Pld	W	D	L	GF	GA	GD	Pts
1	Aizawl	17	7	0	10	23	26	−3	21
2	TRAU	17	4	6	7	15	17	−2	18
3	Indian Arrows	17	4	5	8	10	23	−13	17 (Note: Head-to-head standings: Indian Arrows 4 points, Sudeva Delhi 1 point.)
4	Sudeva Delhi	17	4	5	8	13	23	−10	17
5	Real Kashmir	17	2	8	7	23	31	−8	14
6	Kenkre	17	3	3	11	11	25	−14	12

Source: Hero I-League
Rules for classification: 1) points; 2) head-to-head points; 3) head-to-head goal difference; 4) goal difference; 5) number of goals scored; 6) drawing of lots
Notes:

Pos	Team	Pld	W	D	L	GF	GA	GD	Pts
4	Churchill Brothers	18	9	3	6	24	22	+2	30
5	RoundGlass Punjab	18	8	4	6	33	29	+4	28
6	Rajasthan United	18	5	7	6	16	16	0	22
7	NEROCA	18	4	8	6	21	30	−9	20
8	Aizawl	17	7	0	10	23	26	−3	21

Source: Hero I-League
Rules for classification: 1) points; 2) head-to-head points; 3) head-to-head goal difference; 4) goal difference; 5) number of goals scored; 6) drawing of lots
