= Pintu Mahata =

Indian footballer

Personal information
- Date of birth: 3 June 1997 (age 29)
- Place of birth: West Bengal, India
- Height: 1.78 m (5 ft 10 in)
- Positions: Winger; midfielder

Team information
- Current team: Diamond Harbour
- Number: 27

Youth career
- Mohun Bagan

Senior career*
Years	Team	Apps	(Gls)
2016–2019	Mohun Bagan	9	(7)
2019–2020	East Bengal	7	(3)
2020–2021	Sudeva Delhi	6	(0)
2021	Services		
2021–2022	Indian Navy	3	(0)
2022–2023	Rajasthan United	15	(0)
2023–2024	Indian Navy	6	(0)
2024–	Diamond Harbour	8	(0)
- * Club domestic league appearances and goals

Pintu Mahata (born 3 June 1997) is an Indian professional footballer who plays as a winger for Diamond Harbour.

== Career ==
A youth product for Mohun Bagan, Mahato was included in the club's first-team after injuries to regular starting players Subhasish Bose and Raynier Fernandes. He made his professional debut for the club on 1 April 2017 against Bengaluru FC. He came on as an 89th-minute substitute for Souvik Chakraborty as Mohun Bagan won 3–0. On 3 September 2018, derby debutant Mahato scored his maiden goal against East Bengal and also became the man of the match. On 18 October, against Mohammedan Sporting, Pintu scored an 89th Minute winner and also became the Man of the Match.

=== Rajasthan United ===
In July 2022, I-League outfit Rajasthan United completed the permanent signing of Mahata on a two-year deal.

== Career statistics ==
=== Club ===
As of 19 January 2025

Club	Season	League			Cup		AFC		Total	
Club	Season	Division	Apps	Goals	Apps	Goals	Apps	Goals	Apps	Goals
Mohun Bagan	2016–17	I-League	2	0	0	0	—		2	0
Mohun Bagan	2017–18	I-League	0	0	0	0	—		0	0
Mohun Bagan	2018–19	I-League	7	0	0	0	—		7	0
Mohun Bagan	Mohun Bagan total		9	0	0	0	0	0	9	0
East Bengal	2019–20	I-League	7	0	0	0	—		7	0
Sudeva Delhi	2020–21	I-League	6	0	0	0	—		6	0
Indian Navy	2021	Durand Cup	—		2 (Note: Appearance(s) in Durand Cup)	0	—		2	0
Indian Navy	2022	Durand Cup	—		3	0	—		3	0
Indian Navy	Indian Navy total		—		5	0	—		5	0
Rajasthan United	2022–23	I-League	15	0	0	0	—		15	0
Indian Navy	2023	Durand Cup	—		3	0	—		3	0
Indian Navy	2024	Durand Cup	—		3	0	—		3	0
Indian Navy	Indian Navy total		—		6	0	—		5	0
Diamond Harbour	2024–25	CFL	3	0	1 (Note: Appearance in Sikkim Gold Cup)	0	—		8	0
Diamond Harbour	2024–25	I-League 3	4	0	1	0	—		8	0
Diamond Harbour	2024–25	I-League 2			1	0	—		8	0
Career total			44	0	12	0	0	0	56	0

== Honours ==
=== Club ===
Mohun Bagan

- Calcutta Football League (1): 2018–19

Diamond Harbour

- I-League 3 (1): 2024–25
