= Amritpal Singh (footballer) =

Indian footballer

Personal information
- Date of birth: 9 January 2001 (age 25)
- Place of birth: Amritsar, Punjab, India
- Position: Centre-back

Team information
- Current team: Rajasthan United
- Number: 5

Youth career
- East Bengal

Senior career*
Years	Team	Apps	(Gls)
2016–2019	Pune City B	1	(0)
2019–2022	Hyderabad B	10	(1)
2021–2023	Hyderabad	1	(0)
2022–2023	→ Rajasthan United (loan)	7	(1)
2023–	Rajasthan United	0	(0)
- * Club domestic league appearances and goals as of 14:01, 4 March 2023 (UTC)

Amritpal Singh (born 9 January 2001) is an Indian professional footballer who plays as a defender for I-League club Rajasthan United.

== Club career ==
Amritpal began his football career with the FC Pune City Academy in 2016 before joining Hyderabad FC Reserves Hyderabad FC Reserves in 2019. After featuring for HFC B over two years in various competitions, he was promoted to the first team in 2021–22 season, and was part of the HFC side that won the Indian Super League title in 2022.

On 9 June 2023, Rajasthan United announced the permanent signing of Amritpal. He signed a three-year deal until 2026.

== Honours ==
Hyderabad FC

- Indian Super League: 2021–22
