= Novin Gurung =

Indian footballer (born 1999)

Personal information
- Date of birth: 28 April 1999 (age 27)
- Place of birth: Sikkim, India
- Height: 1.74 m (5 ft 8 1/2 in)
- Position: Right back

Team information
- Current team: Rajasthan United
- Number: 15

Youth career
- Namchi Sports Hostel
- Sports Academy of Sikkim
- 2015–2017: Shillong Lajong

Senior career*
Years	Team	Apps	(Gls)
2017–2019	Shillong Lajong	36	(0)
2019–2020	Real Kashmir	11	(0)
2020–2021	East Bengal	0	(0)
2022–	Rajasthan United	27	(1)
- * Club domestic league appearances and goals as of 23:44, 9 March 2025 (UTC)

Novin Gurung (born 28 April 1999) is an Indian professional footballer who plays as a defender for Indian Football League club Rajasthan United. He also works in the Indian Navy, part of the Indian Armed Forces since 2018.

== Career ==
Born in Sikkim, Gurung began his career at the Namchi Sports Hostel before joining the Sports Academy of Sikkim. He then joined the Shillong Lajong academy in 2015. He was promoted to the first-team before the start of the 2016–17 I-League season. He made his professional debut for the club on 15 February 2017 against East Bengal. He came on as an 82nd-minute substitute for Redeem Tlang as Shillong Lajong drew the match 1–1.

== Career statistics ==
=== Club ===
As of 11 March 2023

Club	Season	League			Cup		AFC		Total	
Club	Season	Division	Apps	Goals	Apps	Goals	Apps	Goals	Apps	Goals
Shillong Lajong	2016–17	I-League	1	0	0	0	—		1	0
Shillong Lajong	2017–18	I-League	17	0	2 (Note: Appearance(s) in Super Cup)	0	—		19	0
Shillong Lajong	2018–19	I-League	18	0	0	0	—		18	0
Shillong Lajong	Shillong Lajong total		36	0	2	0	0	0	38	0
Indian Navy	2019		0	0	3 (Note: Appearance(s) in Durand Cup)	0	–		3	0
Real Kashmir	2019–20	I-League	11	0	0	0	—		11	0
East Bengal	2020–21	Indian Super League	0	0	0	0	—		0	0
Indian Navy	2021		0	0	2	0	–		2	0
Indian Navy	2022		0	0	3	0	–		3	0
Rajasthan United	2022–23	I-League	9	0	0	0	–		9	0
Career total			56	0	10	0	0	0	66	0
