= Nuha Marong =

Gambian footballer (1993)

Personal information
- Full name: Nuha Marong Krubally
- Date of birth: 16 June 1993 (age 33)
- Place of birth: Santa Coloma de Farners, Spain
- Height: 1.91 m (6 ft 3 in)
- Position: Striker

Team information
- Current team: Olot
- Number: 22

Youth career
- Farners
- Blanes
- 2008–2010: PB Lloret
- 2010–2012: Lloret

Senior career*
Years	Team	Apps	(Gls)
2012–2013	Lloret	37	(14)
2013–2016	Llagostera	19	(1)
2014–2015	→ Sant Andreu (loan)	28	(2)
2015–2016	→ Elche B (loan)	36	(21)
2016–2017	Osasuna B	31	(5)
2017–2018	Saguntino	27	(9)
2018	Castellón	4	(0)
2018–2019	Atlético Baleares	40	(13)
2019–2020	Racing Santander	19	(3)
2020–2021	Granada B	34	(6)
2021–2022	UCAM Murcia	11	(2)
2022	Costa Brava	13	(3)
2022	Bashundhara Kings	10	(3)
2022	Rajasthan United	5	(0)
2023	Kelantan	13	(3)
2023–2024	Oman	2	(0)
2024	Atlético Baleares	30	(3)
2025	Unión Sur Yaiza	15	(0)
2025–2026	Atlético Paso	10	(0)
2026–	Olot	14	(1)

International career^{‡}
2019–	Gambia	4	(0)
- * Club domestic league appearances and goals as of 15 May 2026 ‡ National team caps and goals as of 22 March 2019

Nuha Marong Krubally (born 16 June 1993) is a professional footballer who plays as a forward for Olot in the Segunda Federación. Born in Spain, he plays for the Gambia national team.

== Club career ==
Born in Santa Coloma de Farners, Girona, Catalonia to Gambian parents, Nuha represented CE Farners, CD Blanes, Penya Barcelonista de Lloret and CF Lloret as a youth. He made his senior debut with the latter during the 2011–12 season, in the regional leagues.

On 26 June 2013, Nuha joined Segunda División B side UE Llagostera. He was sparingly used during the campaign, but notably scored the winner in a 3–1 home defeat of Gimnàstic de Tarragona in the play-offs, which ensured his team's first-ever promotion to Segunda División.

Nuha subsequently served loan stints at Tercera División sides UE Sant Andreu and Elche CF Ilicitano, scoring a career-best 21 goals for the latter. On 13 July 2016 he moved to another reserve team, CA Osasuna B in the third division.

On 24 June 2017, Nuha signed for Atlético Saguntino still in the third division. The following 17 May, he joined CD Castellón for the fourth tier play-offs, and subsequently agreed to a deal with CD Atlético Baleares on 6 July.

On 9 July 2019, Nuha agreed to a four-year deal with Racing de Santander, newly promoted to Segunda División. On 9 January 2020 he was signed by Granada CF, which first sent him to the reserve team, Club Recreativo Granada.

In 2022, Nuha signed with Bangladeshi outfit Bashundhara Kings. On 18 May, he helped the team winning their 2022 AFC Cup group stage opener with 1–0 margin against Maldivian side Maziya S&RC at the Salt Lake Stadium.

On 29 August 2022, Marong moved to India, signing with I-League side Rajasthan United on a season-long deal.

== International career ==
Nuha was called up for the Gambia national team on 6 February 2019. He made his debut for the latter on 22 March, in an Africa Cup of Nations qualifier against Algeria.

== Career statistics ==
=== Club ===
As of 3 December 2022

Club	Season	League			Cup		Continental		Total	
Club	Season	Division	Apps	Goals	Apps	Goals	Apps	Goals	Apps	Goals
Llagostera	2013–14	Segunda División B	19	2	0	0	—		19	2
Sant Andreu (loan)	2014–15	Segunda División B	29	2	0	0	—		29	2
Elche B (loan)	2015–16	Tercera División	36	21	0	0	—		36	21
Osasuna B	2016–17	Segunda División B	31	5	0	0	—		31	5
Saguntino	2017–18	Segunda División B	27	9	3 (Note: Appearance(s) in Copa Federación)	0	—		30	9
Castellón	2018	Tercera División	4	0	0	0	—		4	0
Atlético Baleares	2018–19	Segunda División B	40	13	0	0	—		40	13
Racing; Santander	2019–20	LaLiga 2	19	3	0	0	—		19	3
Granada B	2019–20	Segunda División B	9	1	0	0	—		9	1
Granada B	2020–21	Segunda División B	25	5	0	0	—		25	5
Granada B	Granada B total		34	6	0	0	0	0	34	6
UCAM Murcia	2021–22	Primera División RFEF	11	2	1 (Note: Appearance(s) in Copa del Rey)	0	—		12	2
Costa Brava	2021–22	Primera División RFEF	13	3	0	0	—		13	3
Bashundhara; Kings	2021–22	Bangladesh; Premier League	10	3	0	0	2 (Note: Appearance(s) in AFC Cup)	2	12	5
Rajasthan United	2022–23	I-League	5	0	0	0	—		5	0
Career total			278	69	4	0	2	2	284	71

== Honours ==
Rajasthan United

- Baji Rout Cup: 2022
