= Kamal Singh Saroha =

Indian sports entrepreneur and engineer

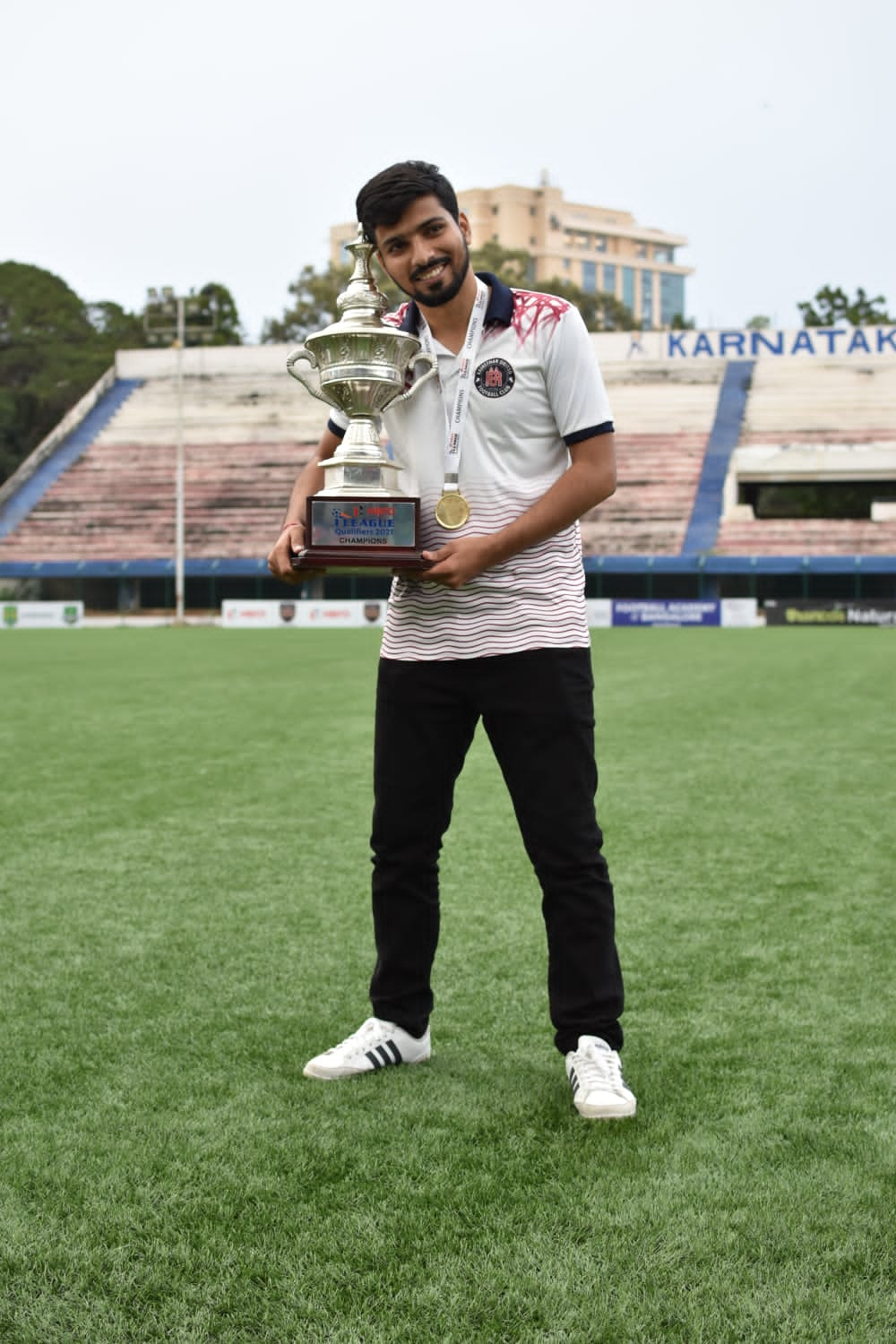
- Born: 21 August 1995 (age 30); Jaipur, India
- Education: Civil Engineering from JECRC Foundation and MBA from SKIT Jaipur
- Occupation: Sports Entrepreneur

Kamal Singh Saroha (born 21 August 1995) is the founder and director of the team Rajasthan United FC which plays in I-League.He also works as a Sports Director of Football for Rajasthan United FC.

== Early life ==
Kamal Singh Saroha obtained a degree in civil engineering in the year of 2018. Like many, he had a craze for the sport of football. He formed a team inside his college, JECRC (Jaipur Engineering College and Research Centre), which did not have its own football team. After graduation, Kamal fell prey to the corporate world as he took up a job in Gurgaon. But, his heart was always with football. So, to follow his passion he went back to Jaipur to open a sporting apparel company.

AU Rajasthan FC, now Rajasthan Perfect FC, one of their clients, were hopeful of participating in the I League 2nd Division. In 2018, an AU Rajasthan representative approached Saroha, requesting him to put out a team in the state league in the upcoming year as there were shortage of team. Later on, Saroha fielded the team JECRC FC (Jaipur Engineering College and Research Centre FC).

== Rajasthan United Football Club ==
In 2020, Kamal Singh Saroha along with Rajat Mishra and Swapnil Dhaka as the co-founders, rebranded the JECRC FC (Jaipur Engineering College and Research Centre FC) to Rajasthan United FC. In 2021, Rajasthan United FC qualified for the I-League, being the first ever club in Rajasthan to qualify for the I-League.
