= Aman Thapa =

Indian footballer

Personal information
- Date of birth: 3 January 1999 (age 27)
- Place of birth: Dehradun, Uttarakhand, India
- Height: 1.70 m (5 ft 7 in)
- Position: Winger

Youth career
- BBFS

Senior career*
Years	Team	Apps	(Gls)
2018–2019	ATK B	5	(0)
2019–2020	Garhwal	7	(3)
2021	Ahbab		
2021	Royal Rangers		
2021–2022	Rajasthan United	19	(3)
2022	Mohammedan	0	(0)
2022–	Rajasthan United	0	(0)
- * Club domestic league appearances and goals as of 21:33, 7 May 2022 (UTC)

Aman Thapa (born 3 January 1999) is an Indian professional footballer who plays as a winger for I-League club Rajasthan United.

== Club career ==
=== Rajasthan United ===
In September 2021, Rajasthan United roped in Thapa ahead of the I-League Qualifiers. On 4 October, Thapa scored the winning goal against Ryntih in a thrilling encounter, which ended 3–2. He played a big role in the club's successful promotion campaign to the I-League, scoring two goals in six appearances.

In February 2022, he was resigned by the club ahead of the I-League restart after the tournament got suspended due to a COVID-19 outbreak among the players and staff. On 8 March, Thapa scored the historic first-ever goal for Rajasthan United in the I-League, in a 1–0 win against Aizawl.

=== Mohammedan ===
In June 2022, Thapa joined Mohammedan on a two-year deal. On 18 June, Rajasthan United officially objected to the transfer of Thapa to Mohammedan. The club has said he has a valid contract till 31 May, 2023.

=== Rajasthan United ===
Thapa returned to Rajasthan United, after the objection was accepted. He was made part of their Durand Cup squad.

== Career statistics ==
=== Club ===
As of 7 May 2022

Club	Season	League			Cup		AFC		Total	
Club	Season	Division	Apps	Goals	Apps	Goals	Apps	Goals	Apps	Goals
ATK B	2018–19	I-League 2nd Division	5	0	0	0	–		5	0
Garhwal	2020	I-League 2nd Division	7	3	0	0	–		7	3
Rajasthan United	2021	I-League 2nd Division	6	2	0	0	–		6	2
Rajasthan United	2021–22	I-League	13	1	0	0	–		13	1
Rajasthan United	Rajasthan United total		19	3	0	0	0	0	19	3
Mohammedan	2022–23	I-League	0	0	0	0	–		0	0
Rajasthan United	2022–23	I-League	0	0	0	0	–		0	0
Career total			31	6	0	0	0	0	31	6
