= Sukhandeep Singh =

Indian footballer (born 2001)

Personal information
- Date of birth: 31 December 2001 (age 24)
- Place of birth: Dibbipura, Punjab, India
- Height: 1.83 m (6 ft 0 in)
- Position: Right-back

Team information
- Current team: Namdhari FC
- Number: 19

Youth career
- 2015–2016: Minerva Punjab
- Bengaluru B

Senior career*
Years	Team	Apps	(Gls)
–2020	Ozone	2	(0)
2020	Real Kashmir	0	(0)
2020–2021	Dalbir FC		
2021–2023	Sudeva Delhi	30	(0)
2023-	Namdhari FC	22	(0)
- * Club domestic league appearances and goals as of 5/5/24 @ 12:25PM(AEST)

Sukhandeep Singh (born 31 December 2001) is an Indian professional footballer who plays as a right-back for I-League club Namdhari FC.

== Career ==
Born in Dibipura village in Tehsil, Punjab. He started his career with Sant Baba Hazara Singh football Academy, Gurdaspur.

== Career statistics ==
As of 11 March 2023

Appearances and goals by club, season and competition
Club	Season	League			Cup		AFC		Total	
Club	Season	Division	Apps	Goals	Apps	Goals	Apps	Goals	Apps	Goals
Ozone	2018–19	I-League 2nd Division	2	0	0	0	–		2	0
Sudeva Delhi	2021–22	I-League	11	0	3 (Note: Appearance(s) in Durand Cup)	0	–		14	0
Sudeva Delhi	2022–23	I-League	19	0	3	0	–		22	0
Sudeva Delhi	Total		30	0	6	0	0	0	36	0
Career total			32	0	6	0	0	0	38	0
