= William Pauliankhum =

Indian footballer

William Neihsial
Personal information
- Full name: William Neihsial Lengen
- Date of birth: 26 September 1998 (age 28)
- Place of birth: Manipur, India
- Position: Winger

Youth career
- Football Club Zalen
- Nangkiew Irat Sports Club

Senior career*
Years	Team	Apps	(Gls)
2019–2020	ATK B	8	(5)
2020–2022	Sudeva Delhi	28	(3)
2022–2024	Rajasthan United	38	(3)
2024	Inter Kashi	0	(0)
2024–2026	Rajasthan United	21	(0)
2026	Samaleswari		
- * Club domestic league appearances and goals as of 13:28, 6 March 2026 (UTC)

William Neihsial Lengen (born 26 September 1998) is an Indian professional footballer who plays as a forward.

== Club career ==
=== Rajasthan United ===
In August 2022, Rajasthan United secured the signature of Neihsial ahead of the Durand Cup campaign.

== Career statistics ==
=== Club ===
As of 15 December 2024

Club	Season	League			Cup		AFC		Total	
Club	Season	Division	Apps	Goals	Apps	Goals	Apps	Goals	Apps	Goals
ATK B	2020	I-League 2nd Division	8	5	2 (Note: Appearance(s) in Durand Cup)	1	—		10	6
Sudeva Delhi	2020–21	I-League	12	2	0	0	—		12	2
Sudeva Delhi	2021–22	I-League	16	1	3	1	—		19	2
Sudeva Delhi	Sudeva Delhi total		28	3	3	1	0	0	31	4
Rajasthan United	2022–23	I-League	20	0	5 (Note: Appearance(s) in Super Cup)	0	—		25	0
Rajasthan United	2023-24	I-League	18	3	4	1	—		22	4
Rajasthan United	Rajasthan United total		38	3	9	1	—		47	4
Inter Kashi	2024-25	I-League	—		—		—		—	
Rajasthan United	2024-25	I-League	5	0	—		—		5	0
