= Atay Dzhumashev =

Kyrgyzstani professional footballer

Personal information
- Full name: Atay Turarovich Dzhumashev
- Date of birth: 15 September 1998 (age 28)
- Place of birth: Bishkek, Kyrgyzstan
- Height: 1.76 m (5 ft 9 in)
- Position: Winger

Team information
- Current team: Muras United
- Number: 70

Youth career
- 2016–2017: Abdysh-Ata Kant

Senior career*
Years	Team	Apps	(Gls)
2017–2018	Abdysh-Ata Kant		
2018	→ Neftchi Kochkor-Ata (loan)		
2019	Energetik-BGU Minsk	7	(0)
2020	Kaganat	13	(3)
2021–2022	Abdysh-Ata Kant	52	(26)
2023	Rajasthan United	13	(1)
2023–2024	Abdysh-Ata Kant	51	(14)
2025–	Muras United		

International career^{‡}
2018	Kyrgyzstan U23	2	(0)
2021–2025	Kyrgyzstan	7	(0)
- * Club domestic league appearances and goals as of 31 December 2024 ‡ National team caps and goals as of 2 September 2025

Atay Turarovich Dzhumashev (Kyrgyz: Атай Жумашев; Russian: Атай Турарович Джумашев; born 15 September 1998) is a Kyrgyzstani professional footballer who plays as a forward for Kyrgyz Premier League club Muras United.

== Club career ==
Dzhumashev began his senior club career at Abdysh-Ata Kant in 2017 with moving to Neftchi Kochkor-Ata on a loan spell in 2018. Dzhumashev enjoyed a fruitful 2022 campaign with Abdysh-Ata Kant in the Kyrgyzstan Premier League since his return to the club in 2021. He found the back of the net 14 times and provided six assists in 26 league matches.

On 5 January 2023, Dzhumashev signed with Indian I-League side Rajasthan United on a season-long deal.

== International career ==
Dzhumashev made his senior international debut for the Kyrgyzstan national team on 2 September 2021 in their 1–0 victory over Palestine. He was later named in the matchday squad for their friendly against Tajikistan in March.

== Career statistics ==
=== Club ===
As of match played 3 August 2019.

Club	Season	League			National Cup		Other		Total	
Club	Season	Division	Apps	Goals	Apps	Goals	Apps	Goals	Apps	Goals
Energetik-BGU Minsk	2019	Belarusian Premier League	7	0	1	0	-		8	0
Career total			7	0	1	0	-	-	8	0
