= Seiminmang Manchong =

Indian footballer

Personal information
- Date of birth: 10 January 2000 (age 26)
- Place of birth: Manipur, India
- Height: 1.74 m (5 ft 8 1/2 in)
- Position: Forward

Team information
- Current team: Sudeva Delhi

Youth career
- TRAU
- 2015–2017: Royal Wahingdoh
- 2017–2018: Delhi Dynamos

Senior career*
Years	Team	Apps	(Gls)
2017–2018	Delhi Dynamos B	9	(4)
2018–2020	Odisha	6	(0)
2020–2021	TRAU	4	(0)
2021–2022	Mohammedan	3	(0)
2022–2024	Sudeva Delhi	12	(4)
2024–2025	Rajasthan United	17	(4)
2025–2026	Gokulam Kerala	0	(0)
2026–	Sudeva Delhi		
- * Club domestic league appearances and goals

Seiminmang Manchong (born 10 January 2000), also known as Mangku Kuki, is an Indian professional footballer who plays as a forward for the I-League 2 club Sudeva Delhi.

== Club career ==
Born in Manipur, Manchong began his career with local club TRAU before joining the youth squad at Royal Wahingdoh in Shillong, Meghalaya.

In 2017, Manchong joined the Delhi Dynamos youth squad and immediately joined their reserve side in the I-League 2nd Division. Manchong played in Delhi Dynamos Reserves first match of the season against Lonestar Kashmir on 21 March 2018. He scored the only goal as his side won 1–0.

=== Delhi Dynamos / Odisha ===
On 16 August 2018, it was announced that Manchong would be called up to the Delhi Dynamos senior pre-season squad prior to the 2018–19 season. A month later, on 22 September, it was announced that Manchong would officially be part of the senior squad for the upcoming season.

Manchong made his senior debut for the club on 17 October 2018 against ATK. He came on as an 87th-minute substitute for Pritam Kotal as Odisha lost 1–2.

== Career statistics ==
=== Club ===
As of 27 April 2024

Club	Season	League			Cup		AFC		Total	
Club	Season	Division	Apps	Goals	Apps	Goals	Apps	Goals	Apps	Goals
Delhi Dynamos B	2017–18	I-League 2nd Division	9	4	0	0	—		9	4
Odisha	2018–19	Indian Super League	2	0	0	0	—		2	0
Odisha	2019–20	Indian Super League	4	0	0	0	—		4	0
Odisha	Odisha total		6	0	0	0	0	0	6	0
TRAU	2020–21	I-League	4	0	0	0	—		4	0
Mohammedan	2021–22	I-League	3	0	0	0	—		3	0
Sudeva Delhi	2022–23	I-League	0	0	2 (Note: Appearance(s) in Durand Cup)	1	—		1	1
Sudeva Delhi	2023–24	I-League 2	12	4	0	0	—		12	4
Sudeva Delhi	Total		12	4	2	1	0	0	14	5
Rajasthan United	2024–25	I-League	17	4	0	0	—		17	4
Career total			51	12	2	1	0	0	53	13

== External golf links ==
- Profile at the Indian Super League website
