= Martín Cháves =

Uruguayan footballer (born 1998)

Personal information
- Full name: Martín Nicolás Cháves García
- Date of birth: 12 May 1998 (age 28)
- Place of birth: Colonia del Sacramento, Uruguay
- Height: 1.65 m (5 ft 5 in)
- Position: Attacking midfielder

Team information
- Current team: Persiraja Banda Aceh
- Number: 10

Youth career
- 2004–2007: Nacional de Colonia
- 2007–2013: Club Juventud Colonia
- 2013–2018: Peñarol
- 2017–2018: → Grêmio (loan)

Senior career*
Years	Team	Apps	(Gls)
2019	Juventud	0	(0)
2019–2020	NorthEast United	18	(3)
2021–2022	Rodos	23	(0)
2022–2023	Rajasthan United	9	(2)
2023–2024	Churchill Brothers	30	(7)
2024–2025	Gokulam Kerala	19	(2)
2026	Técnico Universitario	11	(0)
2026–	Persiraja Banda Aceh	4	(0)

International career
2014–2015	Uruguay U17	4	(0)
- * Club domestic league appearances and goals as of 2 October 2026

Martín Nicolás Cháves García (born 12 May 1998) is a Uruguayan professional footballer who plays as an attacking midfielder for Championship club Persiraja Banda Aceh.

== Club career ==
Cháves started his youth career in his hometown of Colonia del Sacramento with Nacional de Colonia and Juventud Colonia. He soon moved to Montevideo where he joined the academy of Uruguay's most successful club; Peñarol. He failed to break into Peñarol's senior team and joined Brazilian club Grêmio on loan in 2017, where he was assigned to their reserve team.

Uruguayan Primera División club Juventud announced the signing of Cháves on a permanent deal in January 2019, however he didn't receive any game time with their senior team in both the Torneo Apertura and the Torneo Intermedio.

On 29 August 2019, Cháves penned a one-year deal with Indian Super League side NorthEast United.

On 31 July 2021, Cháves joined Greek second division club Rodos.

=== Rajasthan United ===
In August 2022, Cháves returned to India and signed with I-League club Rajasthan United on a one-year deal. On 25 August, he made his debut for the club against East Bengal in the Durand Cup, which ended in a 0–0 stalemate. He came on as a 73rd-minute substitute for Lalremsanga.

In November 2022, he helped his team to reach the final of the Baji Rout Cup in Odisha. They later clinched the title defeating Churchill Brothers. On 12 January 2023, Rajasthan United confirmed that they had parted ways with Cháves. The club stated he had returned to Uruguay, citing personal reasons, in a bid to be close to his family. The post has since been deleted.

=== Churchill Brothers ===
On 16 January 2023, Cháves put pen to paper on a deal until the end of the season.

== International career ==
Cháves is a former Uruguay youth international and represented his nation at the 2015 South American U-17 Championship. He made his tournament debut on 15 March 2015 in a 1–0 win against Ecuador. He played one more match in the tournament, and his side eventually finished fifth.

== Career statistics ==
=== Club ===
As of 19 December 2024

Club	Season	League			Cup		Continental		Total	
Club	Season	Division	Apps	Goals	Apps	Goals	Apps	Goals	Apps	Goals
Juventud	2019	Uruguayan Primera División	0	0	0	0	—		0	0
NorthEast United	2019–20	Indian Super League	18	3	0	0	—		18	3
Rodos	2021–22	Super League Greece 2	23	0	0	0	—		23	0
Rajasthan United	2022–23	I-League	9	2	4 (Note: Appearance(s) in Durand Cup)	1	—		13	3
Churchill Brothers	2022–23	I-League	8	2	4 (Note: Appearance(s) in Super Cup)	2	—		12	4
Churchill Brothers	2023–24	I-League	22	5	0	0	—		22	5
Churchill Brothers	Total		30	7	4	2	0	0	34	9
Gokulam Kerala	2024–25	I-League	5	1	0	0	—		5	1
Career total			85	13	8	3	0	0	93	16

== Honours ==
Rajasthan United

- Baji Rout Cup: 2022
