= Chanso Horam =

Indian footballer

Personal information
- Date of birth: 29 October 2001 (age 25)
- Place of birth: Manipur, India
- Height: 1.70 m (5 ft 7 in)
- Position: Winger

Team information
- Current team: Rajasthan United

Youth career
- Rising Athletic Union (RAU)

Senior career*
Years	Team	Apps	(Gls)
2019–2020	NEROCA	15	(0)
2020–2024	Mumbai City	0	(0)
2020–2021	→ TRAU (loan)	8	(1)
2022–2023	→ Rajasthan United (loan)	16	(0)
2024–	Rajasthan United	0	(0)
- * Club domestic league appearances and goals as of 22:36, 11 March 2023 (UTC)

Chanso Horam (born 29 October 2001) is an Indian professional footballer who plays as a winger for I-League club Rajasthan United.

== Career ==
=== Early years ===
Chanso started his journey playing in the Manipur State League, where he represented several clubs and gathered a lot of experience when he was called up for the Manipur state camp ahead of the Santosh Trophy in 2018. A year later he inspired Yarkhok United to qualify for the Manipur State League in 2019.

Yarkhok United defeated KIYC 4–2 over two legs in the final to become the first team from Ukhrul district to qualify for the Manipur State League in 2019. Horam was one of the players who registered his name on the scoresheet and was an influential figure throughout the season. His consistent performances convinced NEROCA to rope in the youngster.

=== Club career ===
He made his I-League professional debut for Neroca on 30 November 2019 at EMS Stadium against Gokulam Kerala FC, he started and played full match as they lost 2–1.

On 31 October 2020 Chanso signed for Mumbai City FC.

== Playing style ==
He is a technically sound player and primarily plays as an attacking midfielder. However, his pace gives him an added advantage thus, allowing him to play as a right-winger too. He even helps the team in pressing and defense when not in possession.

== Career statistics ==
=== Club ===
As of match played 3 June 2020

Appearances and goals by club, season and competition
Club	Season	League			Cup		Continental		Total	
Club	Season	Division	Apps	Goals	Apps	Goals	Apps	Goals	Apps	Goals
NEROCA	2019–20	I-League	15	0	0	0	-	-	15	0
Total			15	0	0	0	0	0	15	0
