= Helder Lobato =

Brazilian footballer (born 1988)

Personal information
- Full name: Helder Lobato Ribeiro
- Date of birth: 18 July 1988 (age 38)
- Place of birth: Belém, Brazil
- Height: 1.90 m (6 ft 3 in)
- Position: Centre-back

Team information
- Current team: TRAU
- Number: 4

Senior career*
Years	Team	Apps	(Gls)
2011	AA Goiatuba	8	(0)
2011–2012	São Raimundo-PA	6	(1)
2012–2013	Santa Cruz-PA		
2013	Trem (loan)		
2013	Castanhal		
2014	CA Patrocinense	1	(0)
2014	SE Patrocinense		
2014–2015	Tapajós		
2015–2016	Al Wehdat	25	(2)
2016–2017	Borneo FC	22	(0)
2017–2018	Burgan		
2018–2020	Al-Shabab		
2020–	TRAU	24	(2)
- * Club domestic league appearances and goals as of 18:22, 4 May 2022 (UTC)

Helder Lobato Ribeiro (born 18 July 1988), sometimes known as just Helder, is a Brazilian professional footballer who captains plays as a defender for TRAU in the I-League.

== Honours ==
Al-Wehdat

- Jordan League: 2015–16

TRAU

- I-League third place: 2020–21
