= Aydar Mambetaliyev =

Kyrgyz footballer

Personal information
- Full name: Aydar Mambetaliyev
- Date of birth: 22 July 1998 (age 28)
- Place of birth: Bishkek, Kyrgyzstan
- Height: 1.90 m (6 ft 3 in)
- Position: Centre-back

Team information
- Current team: Kyrgyzaltyn
- Number: 67

Youth career
- –2015: Dinamo-Manas

Senior career*
Years	Team	Apps	(Gls)
2016	Alga Bishkek	2	(0)
2017	Abdysh-Ata Kant	0	(0)
2018	Club Valencia	0	(0)
2018–2019	Abdysh-Ata Kant	0	(0)
2019	Ococias Kyoto	0	(0)
2019–2020	Bangladesh Police	5	(0)
2020	Kaganat	3	(0)
2020–2021	Alga Bishkek	6	(0)
2021	Alay Osh	11	(0)
2021–2022	Alga Bishkek	26	(3)
2022–2023	Rajasthan United	15	(4)
2023	FC Talant	7	(1)
2023–2024	Sulut United	11	(0)
2024–	Kyrgyzaltyn	13	(0)
- * Club domestic league appearances and goals as of 27 November 2024

Aydar Mambetaliyev (Kyrgyz: Айдар Мамбеталиев; Russian: Айдар Мамбеталиев; born 22 July 1998) is a Kyrgyz professional footballer who plays as a centre-back for Kyrgyz Premier League club Kyrgyzaltyn.

== Club career ==
=== Earlier career ===
Mambetaliyev started his professional football career at Dinamo-Manas. He also piled his trade for Alga Bishkek, Abdysh-Ata Kant, Kaganat and Alay in Kyrgyzstan. He played 46 matches, until 2022, in the Kyrgyz Premier League. In the process, he has also netted three goals.

Mambetaliyev's first stint outside the country was with Maldivian outfit Club Valencia. Ococias Kyoto and Bangladesh Police are the other foreign clubs for which he has booted up.

=== Rajasthan United ===
In August 2022, Mambetaliyev signed with I-League club Rajasthan United, on a two-year deal. He was made captain of the team ahead of the Durand Cup. On 20 August, he made his debut in a shock 3–2 win over ATK Mohun Bagan, in the Durand Cup. In November, they reached final of Baji Rout Cup in Odisha, and won title defeating Churchill Brothers.

=== Sulut United ===
On 31 October 2023, he signed a contract with Indonesian Liga 2 club Sulut United to play in second round of 2023–24 Liga 2.

== Career statistics ==
=== Club ===
As of 4 February 2024

Club	Season	League			Cup		Continental		Total	
Club	Season	Division	Apps	Goals	Apps	Goals	Apps	Goals	Apps	Goals
Bangladesh; Police	2019–20	Bangladesh Premier; League	5	0	2 (Note: Appearance(s) in Bangladesh Federation Cup)	0	—		7	0
Kaganat	2020	Kyrgyz Premier League	3	0	0	0	—		3	0
Alga Bishkek	2020	Kyrgyz Premier League	6	0	0	0	—		6	0
Alay Osh	2021	Kyrgyz Premier League	11	0	0	0	3 (Note: Appearance(s) in AFC Cup)	1	14	1
Alga Bishkek	2021	Kyrgyz Premier League	15	0	0	0	—		15	0
Alga Bishkek	2022	Kyrgyz Premier League	11	3	0	0	—		11	3
Alga Bishkek	Alga Bishkek total		26	3	0	0	0	0	26	3
Rajasthan United	2022–23	I-League	15	4	5 (Note: Appearance(s) in Durand Cup)	0	–		20	4
FC Talant	2023	Kyrgyz Premier League	7	1	0	0	–		7	1
Sulut United	2023–24	Liga 2	11	0	0	0	–		11	0
Career total			84	8	7	0	3	1	94	9

== Honours ==
Rajasthan United

- Baji Rout Cup: 2022
