= Akeem Abioye =

Nigerian footballer (born 1998)

Personal information
- Date of birth: 12 September 1998 (age 28)
- Place of birth: Nigeria
- Position: Midfielder

Senior career*
Years	Team	Apps	(Gls)
2019–2020	Sudeva Delhi	7	(1)
2021–2022	Rajasthan United	6	(0)
2022–2023	Garhwal		
2023	Sudeva Delhi	14	(0)
- * Club domestic league appearances and goals

Akeem Abioye (born 12 September 1998) is a Nigerian professional footballer who plays as a midfielder.

== Club career ==
Born in Nigeria, Abioye made his senior debut with I-league club Rajasthan United, in the 2021–22 season against RoundGlass Punjab FC and has secured appearances for the Indian side primarily playing as right midfielder.

Initially signed by the Indian side Rajasthan United, he had appearance for the senior squad and played for I-League 2nd Division side (erstwhile) in the I-League Qualifiers season whereby the Nigerian has played up to the standards and made the club enable to acquire the promotion in the I-League.

== Career statistics ==
=== Club ===
As of 11 March 2023

Club	Season	League			Cup		Continental		Total	
Club	Season	Division	Apps	Goals	Apps	Goals	Apps	Goals	Apps	Goals
Rajasthan United	2021	I-League 2nd Division	5	0	0	0	–		5	0
Rajasthan United	2021–22	I-League	1	0	0	0	–		1	0
Rajasthan United	Rajasthan United total		6	0	0	0	0	0	6	0
Sudeva Delhi	2022–23	I-League	14	0	0	0	–		14	0
Career total			20	0	0	0	0	0	20	0
