= Lalremsanga Fanai =

Indian footballer

Personal information
- Full name: Lalremsanga Fanai
- Date of birth: 30 September 2001 (age 25)
- Place of birth: Mamit district, Mizoram, India
- Height: 1.73 m (5 ft 8 in)
- Position: Striker

Team information
- Current team: Mohammedan
- Number: 29

Youth career
- Aizawl

Senior career*
Years	Team	Apps	(Gls)
2017–2019	Aizawl	12	(4)
2020–2022	Aizawl	29	(11)
2022–2024	Rajasthan United	17	(9)
2023–2024	→ Mohammedan (loan)	20	(11)
2024–	Mohammedan	3	(1)
- * Club domestic league appearances and goals as of 8:30, 26 September 2024 (UTC)

Lalremsanga Fanai (born 30 September 2001) is an Indian professional footballer who plays as a forward for Indian Super League club Mohammedan.

== Career ==
Lalremsanga was the top scorer of 2017–18 Mizoram Premier League, he is product of Aizawl F.C. Academy and played a vital role in Aizawl FC's achievement in the 2017–18 Youth League U18, he was also part of the National Under-17 probable squad for the 2017 FIFA U-17 World Cup. He was promoted to senior squad for 2018–19 season.

He made his professional debut for the Aizawl against Shillong Lajong F.C. on 28 October 2018. He started and played full match as Aizawl lost 2–1.

== Career statistics ==
=== Club ===
As of 17 March 2024

Club	Season	League			Cup		AFC		Total	
Club	Season	Division	Apps	Goals	Apps	Goals	Apps	Goals	Apps	Goals
Aizawl	2018–19	I-League	12	4	0	0	—		12	4
Aizawl	2019–20	I-League	0	0	0	0	—		0	0
Aizawl	2020–21	I-League	12	4	0	0	—		12	4
Aizawl	2021–22	I-League	17	7	0	0	—		17	7
Aizawl	Aizawl total		41	15	0	0	0	0	41	15
Rajasthan United	2022–23	I-League	17	9	6 (Note: Appearance(s) in Durand Cup) (Note: Appearance(s) in Super Cup)	2	—		23	11
Mohammedan (loan)	2023–24	I-League	20	11	3	3	—		23	14
Mohammedan	2024–25	Indian Super League	3	1	0	0	—		0	0
Career total			81	36	9	5	0	0	90	40
