= 2022 Durand Cup =

131st edition of the Durand Cup

IndianOil Durand Cup
- Official logo for the 2022 edition

Tournament details
- Country: India
- Venue(s): Kolkata, Guwahati and Imphal
- Dates: 16 August – 18 September
- Teams: 20

Final positions
- Champions: Bengaluru (1st title)
- Runners-up: Mumbai City

Tournament statistics
- Matches played: 47
- Goals scored: 133 (2.83 per match)
- Top goal scorer: Lallianzuala Chhangte (7 goals)

Awards
- Best player: Greg Stewart
- Best goalkeeper: Antonio Dylan (2 clean sheets)
- All statistics correct as of 18 September 2022.

The 2022 Durand Cup (also known as IndianOil Durand Cup due to sponsorship ties with Indian Oil Corporation) was the 131st edition of the Durand Cup, the oldest football tournament in Asia, and also the first edition since it was supported by the Asian Football Confederation. This year for the first time the tournament was played in more than one venue. The tournament is hosted by the Durand Football Tournament Society in co-operation with the AIFF, Eastern Command of the Indian Armed Forces and the Government of West Bengal, supported by the governments Assam and Manipur.

This was the first season of the tournament wherein every club in the top tier Indian Super League has been mandated to participate, along with 5 selected clubs from the I-League, and the four teams representing the armed forces.

Goa was the defending champion, having defeated Mohammedan in the 2021 final, but this time they couldn't progress beyond the group stage. The final was an all-ISL affair for the first time, and Bengaluru won their first-ever Durand Cup by defeating the debutants – Mumbai City by 2–1.

== Teams ==
A total of 20 teams participated in the Indian football season opener: 11 clubs from the top division Indian Super League, 5 clubs from I-League and the traditional 4 teams representing the Indian Armed Forces.

Locations of the participating clubs in Durand Cup

Team	Head coach	Captain	Location
Indian Super League clubs
Mohun Bagan	(Spain) Juan Ferrando	(India) Pritam Kotal	Kolkata, West Bengal
Bengaluru	(England) Simon Grayson	(India) Sunil Chhetri	Bengaluru, Karnataka
East Bengal	(England) Stephen Constantine	(Brazil) Cleiton Silva	Kolkata, West Bengal
Chennaiyin	(Germany) Thomas Brdarić	(India) Anirudh Thapa	Chennai, Tamil Nadu
Goa	(India) Deggie Cardozo	(India) Lesly Rebello	Margao, Goa
Hyderabad	(Spain) Manolo Márquez	(Brazil) João Victor	Hyderabad, Telangana
Jamshedpur	(Spain) Carlos Santamarina	(India) Sandip Mandi	Jamshedpur, Jharkhand
Kerala Blasters	(Poland) Tomasz Tchórz	(India) Sachin Suresh	Kochi, Kerala
Mumbai City	(England) Des Buckingham	(Senegal) Mourtada Fall	Mumbai, Maharashtra
NorthEast United	(India) Subam Rabha	(India) Sampow Rongmei	Guwahati, Assam
Odisha	(Spain) Josep Gombau	(Spain) Carlos Delgado	Bhubaneswar, Odisha
I-League clubs
Mohammedan	(Russia) Andrey Chernyshov	(Trinidad and Tobago) Marcus Joseph	Kolkata, West Bengal
NEROCA	(India) Khogen Singh	(India) Naorem Tondomba Singh	Imphal, Manipur
Rajasthan United	(India) Pushpender Kundu	(Kyrgyzstan) Aydar Mambetaliev	Jaipur, Rajasthan
Sudeva Delhi	(Bhutan) Chencho Dorji	(India) Nischal Chandan	New Delhi, Delhi
TRAU	(India) Nandakumar Singh	(Tajikistan) Komron Tursunov	Imphal, Manipur
Indian Armed Forces teams
Army Green	(India) Robikanta Singh	(India) PC Lallawmkima	—N/a
Army Red	(India) Mileswamy Govindaraju Ramachandran	(India) Jain P	Kolkata, West Bengal
Indian Air Force	(India) Priya Darshan	(India) Shibinraj Kunniyil	New Delhi, Delhi
Indian Navy	(India) Abhilash Vasantha Nair	(India) Vishnu Velutha Kulathil	—N/a

Several top I-League clubs, most notably previous season's champions Gokulam Kerala, withdrew from the tournament. Gokulam cited improper scheduling, therefore chose to solely focus on league games, as they got replaced by Sudeva Delhi.

== Venues ==
A total of 47 matches were played across 3 cities: Kolkata, Guwahati and Imphal, with 27 matches played in Kolkata, including the knock-out fixtures, and 10 matches each played in Guwahati and Imphal.

Kolkata
Vivekananda Yuba Bharati Krirangan	Kishore Bharati Krirangan
Capacity: 85,000	Capacity: 12,000
Guwahati	Imphal
Indira Gandhi Athletic Stadium	Khuman Lampak Stadium
Capacity: 25,000	Capacity: 35,285

== Prize money ==
Position	Amount
Golden Glove	₹3 lakh (US$3,100)
Golden Boot	₹3 lakh (US$3,100)
Golden Ball	₹3 lakh (US$3,100)
Runner-ups	₹30 lakh (US$31,000)
Champions	₹50 lakh (US$52,000)
Total	₹89 lakh (US$92,000)

== Marketing ==
=== Official sponsors and partners ===
==== Co-sponsors ====
- Coal India
- State Bank of India
- ITC
- Punjab National Bank
- GAIL

==== Supported by ====
- Pramerica Life
- JIS Group
- Chemtex
- Siti Networks

==== Associate sponsors ====
- Kalyani Group
- Dalmia Group
- Amul

==== Tournament partner ====
- Cherry Tree

==== Broadcast and streaming partner ====
- Sports18
- Voot

Source: Durand Cup on Twitter

=== Trophy tour ===
The Durand Football Tournament Society (DFTS) organised a 15-day trophy tour prior to the beginning of the tournament. The tour was flagged off at the Eastern Command headquarters at Fort William in Kolkata on 19 July in the presence of the DFTS Chairman and Chief of Staff (Eastern Command) – Lt. Gen. KK Repswal, the Minister of Sports and Youth Affairs (Government of West Bengal) – Aroop Biswas and General Officer Commanding-in-Chief (Eastern Command) – Lt. Gen. RP Kalita. The Durand Cup, along with the President Cup and the Shimla Cup, visited Guwahati on 21 July, Imphal from 24–25 July, Jaipur from 27–28 July and a number of cities in Goa from 2–3 August before returning to Kolkata, where the tour was flagged in on 12 August at Gostha Pal Sarani, in front of the statue of legendary Indian footballer Gostha Pal. The destinations for the tour is selected particularly keeping in mind that Guwahati and Imphal are the first time hosts for the tournament, a Rajasthani team from Jaipur would be participating for the first time after forty years, and the defending champions hail from Goa.

=== Official song ===
On 12 August, the DFTS released a theme song along with a music video to commemorate the age-old tournament entering a new era with the first time recognition from the AFC and participation of all ISL clubs. The song was titled "Durand...Durand" which was sung and performed by Papon, Shaan and Rewben Mashangva. The song was live performed on the opening matchdays at the three respective host venues by Papon and Mashangva.

== Group stage ==
=== Group A ===
Pos	Team	Pld	W	D	L	GF	GA	GD	Pts	Qualification	MOH	BEN	JAM	GOA	IAF
1	Mohammedan (H)	4	3	1	0	9	2	+7	10	Qualify for the Knockout stage	—	1–1	3–0	3–1	2–0
2	Bengaluru	4	2	2	0	9	4	+5	8	Qualify for the Knockout stage	—	—	2–1	2–2	4–0
3	Jamshedpur	4	2	0	2	4	6	−2	6		—	—	—	1–0	2–1
4	Goa	4	1	1	2	4	6	−2	4		—	—	—	—	1–0
5	Indian Air Force	4	0	0	4	1	9	−8	0		—	—	—	—	—

Source: Sportstar
Rules for classification: 1) points; 2) head-to-head points; 3) head-to-head goal difference; 4) goal difference; 5) number of goals scored; 6) drawing of lots
(H) Hosts

=== Group B ===
Pos	Team	Pld	W	D	L	GF	GA	GD	Pts	Qualification	MCI	RUN	AMB	EAB	INA
1	Mumbai City	4	2	1	1	13	7	+6	7 (Note: Head-to-head points: Mumbai City 4, Rajasthan United 3, Mohun Bagan 1.)	Qualify for the Knockout stage	—	5–1	—	—	4–1
2	Rajasthan United	4	2	1	1	6	7	−1	7	Qualify for the Knockout stage	—	—	—	—	2–0
3	Mohun Bagan (H)	4	2	1	1	6	4	+2	7		1–1	2–3	—	—	2–0
4	East Bengal (H)	4	1	2	1	4	4	0	5		4–3	0–0	0–1	—	0–0
5	Indian Navy	4	0	1	3	1	8	−7	1		—	—	—	—	—

Source: Sportstar
Rules for classification: 1) points; 2) head-to-head points; 3) head-to-head goal difference; 4) goal difference; 5) number of goals scored; 6) drawing of lots
(H) Hosts

=== Group C ===
Pos	Team	Pld	W	D	L	GF	GA	GD	Pts	Qualification	HYD	CHE	ARR	NER	TRA
1	Hyderabad	4	3	0	1	8	2	+6	9	Qualify for the Knockout stage	—	3–1	—	—	—
2	Chennaiyin	4	2	1	1	9	6	+3	7	Qualify for the Knockout stage	—	—	2–2	—	—
3	Army Red	4	1	2	1	4	4	0	5		1–0	—	—	0–0	—
4	NEROCA (H)	4	1	1	2	3	6	−3	4		0–3	0–2	—	—	3–1
5	TRAU (H)	4	1	0	3	4	10	−6	3		0–2	1–4	2–1	—	—

Source: Sportstar
Rules for classification: 1) points; 2) head-to-head points; 3) head-to-head goal difference; 4) goal difference; 5) number of goals scored; 6) drawing of lots
(H) Hosts

=== Group D ===
Pos	Team	Pld	W	D	L	GF	GA	GD	Pts	Qualification	ODI	KER	ARG	NEU	SDE
1	Odisha	4	4	0	0	11	0	+11	12	Qualify for the Knockout stage	—	2–0	—	6–0	3–0
2	Kerala Blasters	4	2	1	1	6	3	+3	7	Qualify for the Knockout stage	—	—	2–0	—	—
3	Army Green	4	1	1	2	3	4	−1	4		0–1	—	—	—	0–0
4	NorthEast United (H)	4	1	0	3	3	12	−9	3		0–6	0–3	1–3	—	2–0
5	Sudeva Delhi	4	0	2	2	1	6	−5	2		—	1–1	—	—	—

Source: Sportstar
Rules for classification: 1) points; 2) head-to-head points; 3) head-to-head goal difference; 4) goal difference; 5) number of goals scored; 6) drawing of lots
(H) Hosts

== Knockout stage ==
=== Bracket ===
Quarterfinals
Mohammedan	3
Kerala Blasters	0
Mumbai City (a.e.t.)	5
Chennaiyin	3
Odisha	1
Bengaluru (a.e.t.)	2
Hyderabad	3
Rajasthan United	1

Semifinals
Mohammedan	0
Mumbai City	1
Bengaluru	1
Hyderabad	0

Final
Mumbai City	1
Bengaluru	2

=== Quarter-finals ===
==== Matches ====
9 September 2022
18.00 IST
QF–1

Mohammedan	3–0	Kerala Blasters
Faiaz 17'; Dauda 59', 84'	Report	Basith (yellow card) 86'; Gigi (yellow card) 90'

Vivekananda Yuba Bharati Krirangan, Kolkata
Referee: Crystal John
10 September 2022
18.00 IST
QF–2

Odisha	1–2 (a.e.t.)	Bengaluru
Gahlot (yellow card) 30'; Malik (yellow card) 72'; Sarangi (yellow card) 75' (yellow-red card) 85'; Panwar (yellow card) 90+2'; Maurício 115'	Report	Hernández (yellow card) 27'; Roshan (yellow card) 39'; Narayanan 97'; Krishna (yellow card) 90' (goal) 120+1'

Kishore Bharati Krirangan, Kolkata
Referee: Dipu Roy
11 September 2022
18.00 IST
QF–3

Mumbai City	5–3 (a.e.t.)	Chennaiyin
Stewart 40', 100', 118'; Chhangte 78', 94'; Jahouh (yellow card) 113'	Report	Bag (yellow card) 37'; Slišković 59' (yellow card) 69'; Dhas 89'; Hakhamaneshi (yellow card) 93'; Ali 112'

Vivekananda Yuba Bharati Krirangan, Kolkata
Referee: Aditya Purkayastha
12 September 2022
18.00 IST
QF–4

Hyderabad	3–1	Rajasthan United
Ogbeche 6'; Mishra 45'; Siverio 68'; Onaindia (yellow card) 80'	Report	Cháves 29' (pen.); Mambetaliev (yellow card) 49'

Kishore Bharati Krirangan, Kolkata
Attendance: 1,024
Referee: C. R. Srikrishna

=== Semi-finals ===
==== Matches ====
14 September 2022
18.00 IST
SF–1

Mohammedan	0–1	Mumbai City
Ambekar (yellow card) 55'	Report	Bipin 90'

Vivekananda Yuba Bharati Krirangan, Kolkata
Referee: Rahul Kumar Gupta
15 September 2022
18.00 IST
SF–2

Bengaluru	1–0	Hyderabad
Shrivas (yellow card) 17'; Onaindia 30' (o.g.); Kumar (yellow card) 37'; Roshan (yellow card) 48'	Report	Victor (yellow card) 90'

Vivekananda Yuba Bharati Krirangan, Kolkata
Referee: Rowan Arumughan

=== Final ===
18 September 2022
18.00 IST

Mumbai City	1–2	Bengaluru
Apuia 30'	Report	Narayanan 10'; Costa 61'

Vivekananda Yuba Bharati Krirangan, Kolkata
Referee: C R Srikrishna

== Statistics ==
As of 18 September 2022

=== Top scorers ===
Rank	Player	Team	Goals
1	(India) Lallianzuala Chhangte	Mumbai City	7
2	(Scotland) Greg Stewart	Mumbai City	6
3	(Nigeria) Bartholomew Ogbeche	Hyderabad	5
3	(India) Sivasakthi Narayanan	Bengaluru	5
5	(Spain) Saúl Crespo	Odisha	3
5	(India) Jerry Mawihmingthanga	Odisha	3
5	(India) Mohammed Aimen	Kerala Blasters	3
5	(India) Sunil Chhetri	Bengaluru	3
5	(Fiji) Roy Krishna	Bengaluru	3
5	(Croatia) Petar Slišković	Chennaiyin	3

Hattricks
Player	Goals	Round	Against	Result	Date
(Scotland) Greg Stewart	3	QF	Chennaiyin	5–3	11 September 2022

Note: The team's score of the scorer is denoted first in the result row.

=== Most clean sheets ===
Rank	Player	Team	Clean sheets
1	(India) Antonio Dylan	Odisha	2
1	(India) Kamaljit Singh	East Bengal	2
1	(India) Sankar Roy	Mohammedan	2
1	(India) Lalthuammawia Ralte	Odisha	2
1	(India) Sachin Suresh	Kerala Blasters	2
1	(India) Vishal Kaith	Mohun Bagan	2

=== Most yellow cards ===
- Team – (13) Mohammedan

=== Most red cards ===
- Player – (1 each)
  - (India) Hira Mondal
  - (Senegal) Fallou Diagne
  - (India) Salam Johnson Singh
  - (India) Abhishek Halder
  - (India) Shubham Sarangi
- Team – (1 each)
  - Bengaluru
  - Chennaiyin
  - TRAU
  - Mohammedan
  - Odisha

== Season awards ==
- Golden glove: Antonio Dylan (Odisha)
- Golden boot: Lallianzuala Chhangte (Mumbai City)
- Golden ball: Greg Stewart (Mumbai City)
