= Rajasthan United FC =

Indian association football club based in Jaipur

Rajasthan United
- Full name: Rajasthan United Football Club
- Nickname: Desert Warriors
- Short name: RUFC
- Founded: 2018; 8 years ago (as Jaipur Engineering College and Research Centre CF)
- Ground: Vidhyadhar Nagar Stadium
- Capacity: 3,000
- Owner: Vertak Group
- Head coach: Vikas Rawat
- League: Indian Football League
- 2025–26: Indian Football League, 4th of 10
- Website: rajasthanunitedfc.in
Home colours	Away colours	Third colours

Rajasthan United Football Club is an Indian professional football club based in Jaipur, Rajasthan. Founded in 2018 as JECRC CF, the academy team participated in inaugural edition of R-League A Division in 2019, and clinched the title. In 2020, JECRC CF was rebranded as Rajasthan United. The club is currently competing in the Indian Football League, the second tier of Indian football league system.

Rajasthan United won the 2021 I-League Qualifiers and thus became the first ever club from the state to qualify for the I-League.

== History ==
Rajasthan United FC is the premier professional football club based in Jaipur. The club was founded in 2018 by an engineering student Kamal Singh Saroha, with his colleagues and friends as JECRC CF (Jaipur Engineering College and Research Centre), and re-branded as Rajasthan United in 2020, after the introduction of Rajat Mishra and Swapnil Dhaka as the co-founders. In its first year of inception, they managed to win the R-League A Division. In the second season, United came out as runners-up and earned a spot for the I-League qualifiers.

In collaboration with Witty International School, they set up its residential football academy in Bhilwara. In 2021, United were crowned champions of the I-League Qualifiers, thus becoming the first club from Rajasthan to qualify for the I-League. In December, the club appointed Spanish manager Francesc Bonet as new head coach.

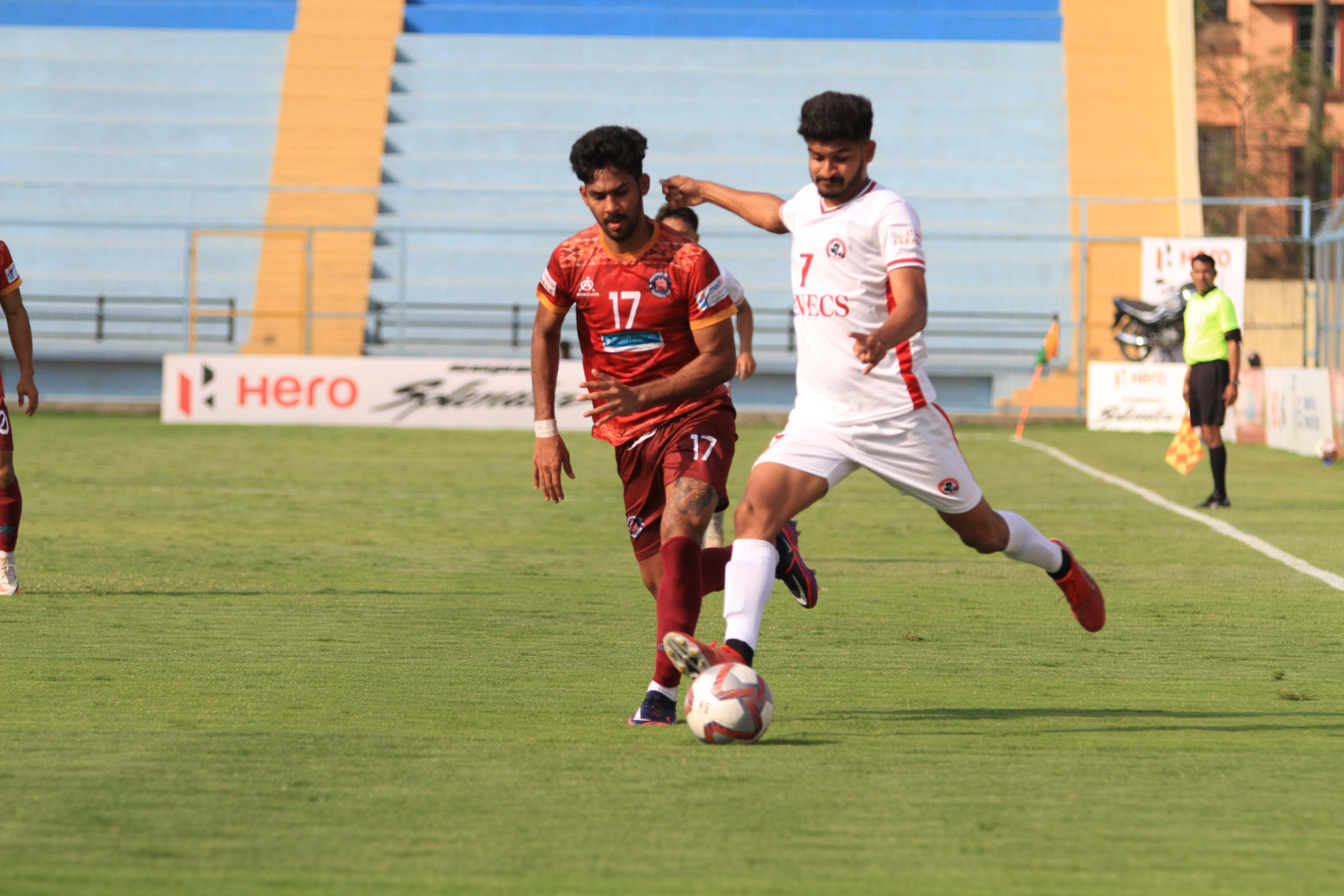
Rajasthan United player (in red), in action against Aizawl on a matchday of I-League, at the Kishore Bharati Krirangan in March 2022.

On 26 December 2021, they made their I-League debut against RoundGlass Punjab with only nine players, in which they were defeated by 2–0. United later roped in former La Liga player Mauro dos Santos of Argentina. The club reached championship stage of 2021–22 I-League and ended their campaign as sixth in league table.

Rajasthan United began their 2022–23 season campaign at the 131st edition of Durand Cup on 20 August with a magnificent 3–2 win against Indian Super League side ATK Mohun Bagan. The club moved to the quarter-finals, defeating Indian Navy in the final group game, but was eliminated losing 3–1 to Hyderabad at the end. In November, the club reached final of Baji Rout Cup in Odisha, in which they clinched title defeating Churchill Brothers in penalty shootout. When the 2022–23 I-League began, the club again faced Churchill Brothers in their first match, and earned three points with 2–1 win. In December, the club participated in Dausa Gold Cup in Rajasthan, in which they finished as runners-up after 1–0 defeat to FC Kerala. In October 2024, the club roped in Uruguayan Walter Caprile as head coach. In the 2024–25 season, the club ended their league campaign with fifth-place finish, securing 33 points.

== Stadiums ==
Rajasthan United FC used the Rajasthan University Sports Complex in Jaipur as their home ground, and sometimes the Witty Sports Club ground. In October 2022, the club announced that they will use Ambedkar Stadium in New Delhi for matches of 2022–23 I-League, as the traditional home and away games format was reinstalled. Before 2021, in few matches of the state league, they used Sawai Mansingh Stadium.

In April 2023, Rajasthan United announced that the club will use Vidyadhar Nagar Stadium in Jaipur in the 2023–24 I-League season. The club hosted all their league home matches at the stadium.

=== 2025–26 season: Floodlight issue ===
In February 2026, it was reported that the club's home matches for the 2025–26 Indian Football League season were likely to be shifted away from the Vidyadhar Nagar Stadium due to the absence of floodlights, which are required for evening broadcast fixtures. As a result, the AIFF considered relocating the matches to alternative venues such as Hyderabad or Haryana.

Club chairman Krishan Kumar Tak publicly expressed frustration over the situation, stating that repeated requests and communications with state authorities regarding the installation of floodlights had not resulted in any concrete action. He also highlighted the disparity in funding priorities, noting that significant financial investments had been made in cricket infrastructure while relatively modest funds required for football facilities remained unapproved.

On 13 March 2026, the issue gained prominence during the club's home fixture against Namdhari at the Vidyadhar Nagar Stadium, which was played in the afternoon due to the absence of floodlights despite concerns over high temperatures. The situation was further complicated by AIFF's guidelines advising against matches in temperatures exceeding 30 °C due to player safety concerns. During the same period, Deputy Chief Minister Diya Kumari and Sports Secretary Neeraj Kumar Pawan, discussed the installation of floodlights, with a proposal worth approximately ₹5 crore reported to be under review.

== Crest ==
The club's crest features historical monuments of Rajasthan, Maharana Pratap and Thar Desert in the background with R.U.F.C. monogram. It symbolises rich royal culture and heritage of Rajasthan.

== Kit manufacturers and shirt sponsors ==
Period	Kit manufacturer	Shirt sponsor
2019–2020	AIO Sports	Fire1on1
2021	AIO Sports	MISTK
2021–2022	Ambition Sportswear	Purnima University
2022–2023	Omtex Sports	Purnima University
2023–2024	AIO Sports	AU Small Finance Bank
2024–present	King Sports	Vertak Group

== Players ==
=== First-team squad ===
As of 1 March 2026

Note: Flags indicate national team as defined under FIFA eligibility rules; some limited exceptions apply. Players may hold more than one non-FIFA nationality.

No.	Pos.	Nation	Player
5	DF	IND	Gursimrat Singh Gill
7	FW	IND	Thomyo Shimray
9	FW	IND	Pranjal Bhumij
10	MF	GHA	Isaac Nortey
11	FW	IND	William Pauliankhum
12	DF	IND	Shafeel PP
14	DF	IND	Lalfelkima Ralte
15	DF	IND	Novin Gurung
16	MF	IND	Pragyan Gogoi
17	MF	ESP	Jordan Lamela

No.	Pos.	Nation	Player
29	MF	BRA	Jonathan Fernandes
30	FW	IND	Pangambam Naoba Meitei
66	GK	IND	Dinesh Choudhary
99	FW	IND	Jaideep Singh
—	FW	BRA	Diego Maurício
—	DF	IND	Jahangir Ahmad (ON loan from Chennaiyin FC)
—	DF	ESP	Adri Castellano

== Personnel ==
=== Current technical staff ===
As of 22 April 2026

Role	Name
Head coach	(India) Vikrant Sharma
Assistant coach	(India) Vikas Rawat
Goalkeeping coach	(India) Dipankar Choudhury
Goalkeeping coach	(India) Neeraj Sharma
Strength and conditioning coach	(India) Himanshu Bisht
Physio	(India) Varun Anil Khergamker
Team manager	(India) Hrishi Kharat
Operation Manager	(India) Kanishka Mazumdar

== Records and statistics ==
=== Overall records ===
As of 2 September 2024

Season	Division	Teams	Position	Avg. attendance	Super Cup	Durand Cup	AFC Champions League	AFC Cup
2021	I-League 2nd Division	9	1st	🔒 Closed Doors ▼	Did not participate ▼	Did not participate ▼	Did not qualify ▼	Did not qualify ▼
2021–22	I-League	13	6th	🔒 Closed Doors ▼	Did not participate ▼	Did not participate ▼	Did not qualify ▼	Did not qualify ▼
2022–23	I-League	12	9th	1,369	Qualifying-playoff	Quarter-finals	Did not qualify ▼	Did not qualify ▼
2023–24		13	11th	207	Did not participate	Did not participate	Did not qualify	Did not qualify

=== Season by season ===
As of 2 September 2024

⭐	Top scorer in division
🇮🇳	Top Indian scorer in division

Season	League									Finals	Super Cup	Other competitions	Top scorer(s)	
Season	Division	Pld	W	D	L	GF	GA	Pts	Pos	Finals	Super Cup	Durand Cup	Player(s)	Goals
2021	I-League 2nd Division	6	3	3	0	8	4	12	Champions	—	Did not participate ▼	Did not participate ▼	(India) Sukhjit Singh (India) Aman Thapa	2
2021–22	I-League	18	5	7	6	16	16	22	6th	—	Did not participate ▼	Did not participate ▼	(Uzbekistan) Sardor Jakhonov (India) Alocious Muthayyan (Spain) Pedro Manzi (India) Pritam Singh	3
2022–23	I-League	22	7	4	11	19	32	25	9th	—	Qualifying-playoff	Quarter-finals	(Kyrgyzstan) Aidar Mambetaliev	4
2023–24	I-League	24	6	7	11	40	63	25	11th	—	Qualifier	Group stage	(Ghana) Richardson Denzell	16
2024–25	I-League	22	9	6	7	34	33	33	5th	—	DNQ	DNP	(Spain) Alain Oyarzun	8
2025–26	I-League									—	Group stage	DNP		

=== Managerial record ===
As of 2 September 2024

Name	Nationality	From	To	P	W	D	L	GF	GA	Win%	Ref.
Vikrant Sharma	India	2020	2021	6	3	3	0	8	4	50.00	
Francesc Bonet	Spain	2021	2022	18	5	7	6	16	16	27.78	
Pushpender Kundu	India	2022	2024	43	13	10	20	51	78	30.23	
Walter Caprile	Uruguay	2024	2025	6	2	1	3	14	6	33.33	
Vikas Rawat	India	2025	present	3	3	0	0	8	2	100.00	

== Notable players ==
=== Past and present internationals ===
The foreign players below have senior/youth international caps for their respective countries. Players whose name is listed, represented their countries before or after playing for Rajasthan United.

- (Tajikistan) Komron Tursunov (2021–2022)
- (Argentina) Mauro dos Santos (2022)
- (Spain) Omar Ramos (2022)
- (Kyrgyzstan) Aidar Mambetaliev (2022–2023)
- (Lebanon) Youssef Atriss (2022–2023)
- (Uruguay) Martín Cháves (2022–2023)
- (The Gambia) Nuha Marong (2022–2023)
- (Kyrgyzstan) Atay Dzhumashev (2022–2023)
- (Ghana) Richard Gadze (2023–2024)
- (Ghana) (Togo) Ibrahim Moro (2023–2024)
- (England) (Burundi) Saido Berahino (2024)
- (Ecuador) Ronaldo Johnson Mina (2024–)
- (Uruguay) Maicol Cabrera (2025–)
- (Ghana) Abdul Halik Hudu (2025–present)

== Honours ==
=== League ===
- I-League 2nd Division
  - Champions (1): 2021
- Rajasthan State Men's League
  - Champions (1): 2019
  - Runners-up (1): 2021

=== Cup ===
- Sikkim Gold Cup
  - Champions (1): 2025
- Baji Rout Cup
  - Champions (1): 2022
- Dausa Gold Cup
  - Runners-up (1): 2022
- Captain Pratap Singh Memorial Cup (Note: The tournament is known fully as "All India Late Captain Pratap Singh Memorial Football Tournament; The Reserve team of Rajasthan United FC finished as runner-up in 2023)
  - Runners-up (1): 2023
- LAHDC Climate Cup
  - Runners-up (1): 2025

== RUFC youth ==
Youth football is practiced in Rajasthan United FC, and their under-17 team for the first time, took part in the 2022–23 U-17 Youth Cup in January 2023. The club launched a residential football academy in Bhilwara, Rajasthan, in 2021, collaborating with Poornima University. The academy of Rajasthan United gained an 'elite category' accreditation by the All India Football Federation in December 2023. Clubs under-17 team took part in Administrator's Challenge Cup in Chandigarh in 2022.

Honours

- Rajasthan U-17 Senior Open Tournament
  - Runners-up (1): 2022–23

== Affiliated clubs ==
The following clubs are affiliated with Rajasthan United FC:

- (India) Kohima Town Club (2022–present)
- (Germany) TSG 1899 Hoffenheim (2025–present)
- (Germany) FC Ingolstadt 04 (2025–present)

== See also ==
- List of football clubs in India
