= 2023–24 Rajasthan United FC season =

6th season in existence of Rajasthan United FC

Rajasthan United FC
2023–24 season
- Owner: R.U.F.C. Sports Private Limited
- Chairman: Krishan Kumar Tak
- Manager: Pushpender Kundu
- Stadium: Vidyadhar Nagar Stadium
- I-League: 11th
- Durand Cup: Group stage
- Federation Cup: Group stage
- Top goalscorer: League: Richardson Denzell (16); All: Richardson Denzell (19)
Home colours	Away colours	Third colours

The 2023–24 season was the sixth season of Rajasthan United and the club's third consecutive season in the second tier of Indian football. In addition to the domestic league, Rajasthan United competed in this season's editions of the Durand Cup and Federation Cup. The season covered the period from 1 June 2023 to 31 May 2024.

== First team ==
=== First-team coaching staff ===
Position	Name	Nationality	Year appointed	Last club/team	References
Manager	Pushpender Kundu	India	2022	(India) Rajasthan United (as assistant coach)	
Assistant Coach	Prashant J Singh	India	2022	(India) Thane City (CEO)	
Goalkeeping Coach	Joel Prabhakar Raj	India	2022	(India) Hyderabad FC Reserves (as goalkeeping coach)	

=== First-team squad ===
Notes:

- Players and squad numbers last updated on 10 August 2023.
- Appearances and goals last updated on 21 August 2023, including all competitions for senior teams.
- Flags indicate national team as defined under FIFA eligibility rules. Players may hold more than one non-FIFA nationality.
- Player^{*} – Player who joined the club permanently or on loan during the season.
- Player^{†} – Player who departed the club permanently or on loan during the season.

No.	Player	Nat.	Position(s) (Footedness)	Date of birth (age)	Signed		Transfer fee	Apps.	Goals
No.	Player	Nat.	Position(s) (Footedness)	Date of birth (age)	In	From	Transfer fee	Apps.	Goals
Goalkeepers
1	Sachin Jha^{*}	IND	GK (R)	16 March 2000 (age 26)	2023	(India) Sudeva Delhi	Free transfer	3	0
12	Anant Shah^{*}	IND	GK (R)	19 October 2007 (age 19)	2023	(India) Rajasthan United Academy	Free transfer	0	0
42	Gaurav Kumar Singh^{*}	IND	GK (R)	14 September 1994 (age 32)	2023	(India) Jaipur United	Free transfer	0	0
Defenders
2	Naresh Singh^{*}	IND	RB (R)	1 April 1998 (age 28)	2023	(India) TRAU	Free transfer	3	0
3	Suraj Negi^{*}	IND	LB (L)	17 January 1996 (age 30)	2023	(India) Mumbai Kenkre	Free transfer	3	0
4	Banpynkhrawnam Nongkhlaw^{*}	IND	CB (L)	21 September 1997 (age 29)	2023	(India) Mumbai Kenkre	Free transfer	2	0
5	Amritpal Singh^{*}	IND	CB (R)	9 January 2001 (age 25)	2023	(India) Hyderabad	Free transfer	10	1
19	Sairuat Kima^{*}	IND	CB (R)	7 November 1997 (age 29)	2023	(India) Mohammedan	Free transfer	3	0
21	Gautam Virwani^{*}	IND	CB / LB (L)	1 May 2001 (age 25)	2023	(India) Jagat Singh Palahi	Free transfer	1	0
33	Sanit Dhadwal^{*}	IND		9 November 2001 (age 25)	2023	(India) HOPS FC	Free transfer	0	0
50	Matthew Dunga^{*}	GHA	CB (R)	7 November 1994 (age 32)	2023	(Ghana) Accra Great Olympics	Free transfer	2	0
93	Hardik Bhatt (captain)	IND	RB (R)	17 April 1997 (age 29)	2021	(India) Bengaluru United	Free transfer	20	0
–	Lalbiakzuala^{*}	IND	LB (L)	27 May 2000 (age 26)	2023	(India) Aizawl	Free transfer	0	0
–	Mohit Singh Verito^{*}	IND	RB (R)	5 August 2000 (age 26)	2023	(Spain) Olímpic de Xàtiva	Free transfer	0	0
Midfielders
6	Gou Kuki^{*}	IND	DM / CM (R)	25 October 2000 (age 26)	2023	(India) Sudeva Delhi	Free transfer	0	0
8	Zoma Vanlalzahawhma	IND	CM / AM (R)	29 December 2000 (age 25)	2022	(India) Sudeva Delhi	Free transfer	11	0
10	Ragav Gupta	IND	CM (L)	9 January 1999 (age 27)	2022	(India) Real Kashmir	Free transfer	23	0
13	Jacob John Kattookaren^{*}	IND	CM (R)	13 November 1999 (age 26)	2023	(India) SC Bengaluru	Free transfer	2	0
16	Jirjar Terang^{*}	IND	CM / DM (R)	2 April 2000 (age 26)	2023	(India) Downtown Heroes	Free transfer	0	0
18	Surag Chhetri^{*}	IND	CM / AM (R)	6 April 2000 (age 26)	2023	Oil India	Free transfer	2	0
20	Lalremruata HP^{*}	IND	CM / AM (R)	20 March 2002 (age 24)	2023	(India) Goa	Free transfer	1	0
24	Yash Tripathi	IND	RM / AM (R)	20 January 2001 (age 25)	2022	(India) Neerja Modi FA	Free transfer	3	0
88	Lalhunmawia Chhakchhuak^{*}	IND	DM (R)	9 May 2005 (age 21)	2023	(India) Chanmari	Free transfer	3	0
Attackers
9	Amit Godara^{*}	IND	ST (R)	7 August 2001 (age 25)	2023	(India) Jaipur United	Free transfer	0	0
11	William Neihsial	IND	RW / AM (L)	26 September 1998 (age 28)	2022	(India) Sudeva Delhi	Free transfer	28	1
17	Lalchungnunga Chhangte^{*}	IND	LW (R)	24 January 2001 (age 25)	2023	(India) Hyderabad	Loan transfer	3	0
22	Richardson Denzell^{*}	GHA	ST (R)	1 November 2004 (age 22)	2023	(Ghana) Asekem FC	Free transfer	3	1
26	Malsawmzuala Tlangte^{*}	IND	LW (R)		2023	(India) SYS FC	Free transfer	1	0
–	Pravitto Raju^{*}	IND	RW (R)	25 April 1997 (age 29)	2023	(India) Mumbai Kenkre	Free transfer	0	0
Out on loan
29	Lalremsanga Fanai^{†}	IND	RW (R)	30 September 2001 (age 25)	2022	(India) Aizawl	Free transfer	23	2

== New contracts and transfers ==
=== New contracts ===
Date	No.	Pos.	Nat.	Player	Ref.
27 June 2023	9	FW	(India)	Amit Godara	
15 July 2023		FW	(India)	Imran Mani	

=== Transfers in ===
Date	No.	Pos.	Nat.	Player	Transferred from	Fee	Ref.
8 June 2023	4	DF	(India)	Banpynkhrawnam Nongkhlaw	(India) Mumbai Kenkre	Free transfer	
9 June 2023	5	DF	(India)	Amritpal Singh	(India) Hyderabad	Free transfer	
16 June 2023	6	MF	(India)	Gou Kuki	(India) Sudeva Delhi	Free transfer	
21 June 2023	17	MF	(India)	Lalchungnunga Chhangte	(India) Hyderabad	Loan transfer	
22 June 2023	18	MF	(India)	Surag Chhetri	Oil India	Free transfer	
24 June 2023	20	MF	(India)	Lalremruata HP	(India) Goa	Free transfer	
26 June 2023	42	GK	(India)	Gaurav Chandel	(India) Jaipur United	Free transfer	
28 June 2023	88	MF	(India)	Lalhunmawia Chhakchhuak	(India) Chanmari	Free transfer	
29 June 2023		MF	(India)	Pravitto Raju	(India) Mumbai Kenkre	Free transfer	
2 July 2023		DF	(India)	Lalbiakzuala	(India) Aizawl	Free transfer	
6 July 2023		MF	(India)	Zothanpuia	(India) Aizawl Reserves	Free transfer	
8 July 2023	3	DF	(India)	Suraj Negi	(India) Mumbai Kenkre	Free transfer	
12 July 2023		DF	(India)	Mohit Singh Verito	(Spain) Olímpic de Xàtiva	Free transfer	
16 July 2023	21	DF	(India)	Gautam Virwani	(India) Jagat Singh Palahi	Free transfer	
17 July 2023	19	DF	(India)	Sairuat Kima	(India) Mohammedan	Free transfer	
18 July 2023	16	MF	(India)	Jirjar Terang	(India) Downtown Heroes	Free transfer	
20 July 2023	13	MF	(India)	Jacob John Kattookaren	(India) SC Bengaluru	Free transfer	
22 July 2023	33	DF	(India)	Sanit Dhadwal	(India) HOPS FC	Free transfer	
24 July 2023	26	FW	(India)	Malsawmzuala Tlangte	(India) SYS FC	Free transfer	
30 July 2023	1	GK	(India)	Sachin Jha	(India) Sudeva Delhi	Free transfer	
30 July 2023	22	FW	(Ghana)	Richardson Denzell	(Ghana) Asekem FC	Free transfer	
10 August 2023	50	DF	(Ghana)	Matthew Dunga	(Ghana) Accra Great Olympics	Free transfer	

=== Transfers out ===
Date	No.	Pos.	Nat.	Player	Transferred to	Fee	Ref.
7 June 2023	67	DF	(Kyrgyzstan)	Aidar Mambetaliev	(Kyrgyzstan) Talant	Free transfer	
7 June 2023	7	MF	(Kyrgyzstan)	Atai Dzhumashev	(Kyrgyzstan) Abdysh-Ata Kant	Free transfer	
7 June 2023	9	MF	(Uzbekistan)	Otabek Zokirov		Free transfer	
7 June 2023	8	MF	(Kyrgyzstan)	Bektur Amangeldiev	(Cambodia) Nagaworld	Free transfer	
1 July 2023	6	MF	(India)	Lalliansanga Renthlei	(India) Odisha	Free transfer	
20 July 2023	23	DF	(India)	Melroy Assisi	(India) Punjab	Undisclosed	
25 July 2023	1	GK	(India)	Vishal Joon		Free transfer	
13 August 2023	18	MF	(India)	Souvik Das	(India) SC Bengaluru	Free transfer	
14 August 2023	17	DF	(India)	Jagdeep Singh	(India) Sreenidi Deccan	Free transfer	

=== Loans out ===
Date	No.	Pos.	Nat.	Player	Loaned to	On loan until	Ref.
6 July 2023	29	FW	(India)	Lalremsanga Fanai	(India) Mohammedan	31 May 2024	

== Competitions ==
=== Overall record ===
Competition	First match	Last match	Starting round	Final position	Record							
Competition	First match	Last match	Starting round	Final position	Pld	W	D	L	GF	GA	GD	Win %
I-League	28 October 2023	TBD	Matchday 1	TBD	20	6	7	7	36	42	−6	30.00
Durand Cup	5 August 2023	21 August 2023	Group stage	Group stage	3	1	1	1	2	2	+0	33.33
SuperCup	8 January 2024	8 January 2024	Qualifier	Qualifier	1	0	0	1	0	5	−5	0.00
Total					24	7	8	9	38	49	−11	29.17

Source: Soccerway

== Competitions ==
=== I-League ===
==== League table ====
Pos	Team	Pld	W	D	L	GF	GA	GD	Pts	Qualification
9	Namdhari	24	7	6	11	29	40	−11	27	
10	Aizawl	22	6	7	9	36	35	+1	25	
11	Rajasthan United	24	6	7	11	40	63	−23	25	
12	NEROCA (R)	23	4	2	17	26	61	−35	14	Relegation to I-League 2
13	TRAU (R)	23	4	1	18	26	64	−38	13	Relegation to I-League 2

Source: I-League
Rules for classification: 1) Points; 2) Head-to-head points; 3) Head-to-head goal difference; 4) Total goal difference; 5) Total number of goals scored; 6) drawing of lots
(Note: Head-to-head record is used only after all the matches between the teams in question have been played).
(R) Relegated

==== Matches ====
Note: I-League announced the fixtures for the 2023–24 season on 6 October 2023.

28 October 2023 1	Real Kashmir	2–0	Rajasthan United	Srinagar
14:00 IST	Wayne Vaz 49'; Shaher Shaheen 90+7'	Report		Stadium: TRC Turf Ground; Attendance: 1,872; Man of the Match: Wayne Vaz (Real Kashmir)

2 November 2023 2	Delhi	4–3	Rajasthan United	Bhaini Sahib
14:00 IST	Aroldinho 3', 44'; Gurtej Singh 33'; Sérgio Barboza 53' (pen.)	Report	Yash Tripathi 13', 66', 68'	Stadium: Namdhari Stadium

9 November 2023 3	Gokulam Kerala	6–0	Rajasthan United	Kozhikode
19:00 IST	Komron Tursunov 33'; Álex Sánchez 61', 74', 88'; Sreekuttan VS 69'	Report		Stadium: EMS Stadium; Attendance: 4,318; Man of the Match: Álex Sánchez

13 November 2023 4	Rajasthan United	2–0	Churchill Brothers	Hyderabad
19:00 IST	Lalchungnunga 5'; Richard Gadze 38'	Report		Stadium: Deccan Arena; Man of the Match: Richard Gadze (Rajasthan United)

18 November 2023 5	Rajasthan United	1–2	Mohammedan	Hyderabad
19:00 IST	Ragav Gupta 90+4'	Report	Sagolsem Bikash Singh 45+1'; Eddie Hernández 69'	Stadium: Deccan Arena; Man of the Match: Sagolsem Bikash Singh (Mohammedan)

23 November 2023 6	Rajasthan United	1–2	Sreenidi Deccan	Hyderabad
19:00 IST	Richardson Denzell 4'		William Alves 45+2'; Jefferson Oliveira 45+5' (o.g.)	Stadium: Deccan Arena; Man of the Match: Eli Sabiá

28 November 2023 7	Rajasthan United	2–2	Aizawl	Hyderabad
14:00 IST	Seigoulun Khongsai 23'; Richardson Denzell 31'	Report	Lalrinzuala Lalbiaknia 26', 68'	Stadium: Deccan Arena; Man of the Match: Lalrinzuala Lalbiaknia

3 December 2023 7	Rajasthan United	1–1	Shillong Lajong	Hyderabad
16:30 IST	Richardson Denzell 10'	Report	Daniel Gonçalves 90+5'	Stadium: Deccan Arena; Man of the Match: Ibrahim Morro (Rajasthan United)

6 December 2023 9	Rajasthan United	2–2	Inter Kashi	Hyderabad
16:30 IST	Denzell 40' (pen.); Mandi 51' (o.g.)	Report	Passi 4'; Nikum 24'	Stadium: Deccan Arena; Referee: Mrutyunjay Amatya; Man of the Match: Richard Gadze(Rajasthan United)

15 December 2023 10	NEROCA	3–4	Rajasthan United	Kolkata
19:00 IST	Dário Júnior 45+3' (o.g.); Ansumana Kromah 81'; Lourembam David 86'		Syed Suhail Pasha 24'; Lalchungnunga Chhangte 45+4'; Richardson Denzell 53', 84'	Stadium: Kalyani Stadium; Man of the Match: Richardson Denzell

22 December 2023 11	Rajasthan United	5–4	TRAU	Hyderabad
19:00 IST	William 21'; Richardson Denzell 58', 68', 90+6'; Novin Gurung 85'		Abraham Okyere 9'; Danish Aribam 31'; Deepak Singh 53'; Jefferson Oliveira 55' (o.g.)	Stadium: Deccan Arena

9 February 2024 13	Rajasthan United	1–0	Real Kashmir	Bhaini Ala
14:00 IST	Marin Mudrazija 90+2'	Report		Stadium: Namdhari Stadium; Attendance: 100; Referee: Akahkumar Kamaleshkumar Mehta; Man of the Match: Marin Mudrazija(Rajasthan United)

13 February 2024 14	Mohammedan	5–1	Rajasthan United	Kolkata
19:00 IST				Stadium: Naihati Stadium

16 February 2024 15	Rajasthan United	1–4	Gokulam Kerala	Bhaini Ala
19:00 IST	Denzell 9'		Komron Tursunov 28', 64'; Álex Sánchez 50'; Laishram Johnson 81'	Stadium: Namdhari Stadium; Man of the Match: Komron Tursunov (Gokulam)

23 February 2024 16	Aizawl	0–0	Rajasthan United	Aizawl
19:00 IST				Stadium: Rajiv Gandhi Stadium

28 February 2024 17	Shillong Lajong	4–4	Rajasthan United	Shillong
19:00 IST	Kynsaibor Lhuid 24'; Douglas Tardin 45+3' (pen.); Daniel Goncalves 80'; Phrangki Buam 85'		Naoba Meitei 12'; Ragav Gupta 51'; Richardson Denzell 90+3'; Lalchungnunga Chhangte 90+5'	Stadium: SSA Stadium; Attendance: 6,617; Referee: Surojit Das; Man of the Match: Daniel Goncalves (Shillong Lajong)

2 March 2024 18	Inter Kashi	1–1	Rajasthan United	Kalyani
16:30 UTC+5:30	Mario Barco 40'		Lalchungnunga Chhangte 28'	Stadium: Kalyani Stadium

6 March 2024 12	Rajasthan United	0–0	Namdhari	Bhaini Ala
15:30 IST		Report		Stadium: Namdhari Stadium; Attendance: 500; Referee: Lalit Singh Rawat; Man of the Match: Richardson Denzell (Rajasthan United)

11 March 2024 19	Rajasthan United	5–1	NEROCA	Bhaini Ala
13:30 IST	Richardson Denzell 20'; Marin Mudrazija 26', 54', 80'; Kima 90'	Report	Lourembam David Singh 40'	Stadium: Namdhari Stadium; Attendance: 100; Referee: Tanmoy Dhar; Man of the Match: Marin Mudrazija (Rajasthan United)

15 March 2024 20	TRAU	0–2	Rajasthan United	Kalyani
16:30 IST		Report	Richardson Denzell 4'; William Pauliankhum 66'	Stadium: Kalyani Stadium; Attendance: 222; Referee: Ashish Tiwari; Man of the Match: Richardson Denzell (Rajasthan United)

22 March 2024 21	Namdhari	2–0	Rajasthan United	Bhaini Ala
15:30 IST	Manvir Singh 64'; Iván Garrido 78'	Report		Stadium: Namdhari Stadium; Attendance: 400; Referee: Dipu Roy; Man of the Match: Peter Haokip (Namdhari)

31 March 2024 22	Sreenidi Deccan	6–1	Rajasthan United	Hyderabad
16:30 IST	Alves 8', 42'; Lalromawia 15', 90+2'; Hassan 61'; Bawitlung 86'	Report	Naoba Meitei 74'	Stadium: Deccan Arena; Attendance: 149; Referee: I. Jamal Mohamed; Man of the Match: Lalromawia (Sreenidi Deccan)

5 April 2024 23	Rajasthan United	3–6	Delhi	Bhaini Ala
15:30 IST	Denzell 20', 73'; Gupta 90+3'	Report	Poojary 8'; Kholmurodov 39'; NT Singh 44'; A. Singh 65', 87' (o.g.); Dias 89'	Stadium: Namdhari Stadium; Attendance: 200; Referee: Akashkumar Mehta; Man of the Match: Hudson Jesus (Delhi)

10 April 2024 24	Churchill Brothers	7–0	Rajasthan United	Vasco
19:00 IST	Ogana Louis 17', 46'; Costa 26'; Semkholun 50'; Cháves 73'; Dias 88'; Samb 90+4'	Report		Stadium: Tilak Maidan; Attendance: 550; Referee: I. Jamal Mohamed; Man of the Match: Ogana Louis (Churchill Brothers)

=== Durand Cup ===
==== Group Stage ====
Pos	Team	Pld	W	D	L	GF	GA	GD	Pts	Qualification	ARM	RJU	BDO	OFC
1	Indian Army	3	2	1	0	3	1	+2	7	Qualify for the knockout stage	—	—	—	—
2	Rajasthan United	3	1	1	1	2	2	0	4		0–0	—	—	—
3	Bodoland (H)	3	1	0	2	3	4	−1	3		1–2	0–1	—	2–1
4	Odisha	3	1	0	2	3	4	−1	3		0–1	2–1	—	—

Source: Twitter
Rules for classification: Group stage tiebreakers
(H) Hosts

==== Matches ====
The fixtures were announced on 22 July 2023. Rajasthan United was drawn in Group F for the 132nd edition of the Durand Cup.

Win Draw Loss

5 August 2023 Group stage	Bodoland	0–1	Rajasthan United	Kokrajhar, Assam
14:30 IST	S. Basumatary (yellow card) 83'	Report	R. Gupta (yellow card) 28'; Neihsial 47'; J. Kattookaren (yellow card) 86'; Nongkhlaw (yellow card) 90+5'	Stadium: SAI Stadium; Attendance: 9,246; Referee: Ashwin; Man of the Match: William Neihsial (Rajasthan United)

11 August 2023 Group stage	Odisha	2–1	Rajasthan United	Kokrajhar, Assam
18:00 IST	P. Samal (yellow card) 12'; C. Murmu 49'; A. Aphaoba Singh 64' (pen.); Antonay (yellow card) 85'	Report	Nongkhlaw (yellow card) 26'; L. Chhangte (yellow card) 28'; R. Denzell 52'; L. Chhakchhuak (yellow card) 90+4'	Stadium: SAI Stadium; Man of the Match: Ashangbam Aphaoba Singh (Odisha)

21 August 2023 Group stage	Rajasthan United	0–0	Indian Army	Kokrajhar, Assam
18:00 IST	Kima (yellow card) 4'; L. Chhakchhuak (yellow card) 34'	Report	Meitei (yellow card) 5'; D. Singh (yellow card) 25'; Premkumar SK (yellow card) 59'	Stadium: SAI Stadium; Man of the Match: Sairuat Kima (Rajasthan United)

=== Indian Super Cup ===
Rajasthan entered the competition in the play-off round. Inter Kashi defeated Rajasthan United in the qualification round by 5–0 on 8 January, the fixtures were announced on 18 December 2023.

8 January 2024 2024 Indian Super Cup qualifier	Inter Kashi	5–0	Rajasthan United	Bhubaneswar
14:00 UTC+5:30	Barco 10', 75'; Lalrindika 58'; Haobam 87'; Ajsal 88'	Report		Stadium: Kalinga Stadium; Referee: Pranjal Banerjee (India); Man of the Match: Mario Barco (Inter Kashi)

== Statistics ==
Keys
No.	Squad number	Pos.	Position
Player^{*}	Player who joined the club permanently or on loan during the season		
Player^{†}	Player who departed the club permanently or on loan during the season		

=== Appearances ===
Includes all competitions for senior teams.

As of 21 August 2023

2023–24 season							Club total
No.	Pos.	Player	I-League	Federation Cup	Durand Cup	Total	Club total
1	GK	(India) Sachin Jha^{*}	0	0	3	3	3
2	DF	(India) Naresh Singh^{*}	0	0	1+2	1+2	3
3	DF	(India) Suraj Negi^{*}	0	0	3	3	3
4	DF	(India) Banpynkhrawnam Nongkhlaw^{*}	0	0	2	2	2
5	DF	(India) Amritpal Singh^{*}	0	0	0+1	0+1	10
6	MF	(India) Gou Kuki	0	0	0	0	0
8	MF	(India) Zoma Vanlalzahawhma	0	0	3	3	11
9	FW	(India) Amit Godara^{*}	0	0	0	0	0
10	MF	(India) Ragav Gupta	0	0	2+1	2+1	23
11	FW	(India) William Neihsial	0	0	3	3	28
12	GK	(India) Anant Shah^{*}	0	0	0	0	0
13	MF	(India) Jacob John Kattookaren^{*}	0	0	0+2	0+2	2
16	MF	(India) Jirjar Terang^{*}	0	0	0	0	0
17	FW	(India) Lalchungnunga Chhangte^{*}	0	0	3	3	3
18	MF	(India) Surag Chettri^{*}	0	0	1+1	1+1	2
19	DF	(India) Sairuat Kima^{*}	0	0	3	3	3
20	MF	(India) Lalremruata HP^{*}	0	0	0+1	0+1	1
21	DF	(India) Gautam Virwani^{*}	0	0	0+1	0+1	1
22	FW	(Ghana) Richardson Denzell^{*}	0	0	3	3	3
24	MF	(India) Yash Tripathi	0	0	0+1	0+1	3
26	FW	(India) Malsawmzuala Tlangte	0	0	0+1	0+1	1
33	DF	(India) Sanit Dhadwal^{*}	0	0	0	0	0
42	GK	(India) Gaurav Kumar Singh^{*}	0	0	0	0	0
50	DF	(Ghana) Matthew Dunga^{*}	0	0	1+1	1+1	2
88	MF	(India) Lalhunmawia Chhakchhuak^{*}	0	0	3	3	3
93	DF	(India) Hardik Bhatt	0	0	2	2	20

=== Goals ===
Includes all competitions for senior teams. The list is sorted by squad number when season-total goals are equal. Players with no goals are not included in the list.

As of 21 August 2023

2023–24 season								Club total
Rk.	No.	Pos.	Player	I-League	Federation Cup	Durand Cup	Total	Club total
1	11	FW	(India) William Neihsial	0	0	1	1	1
1	22	FW	(Ghana) Richardson Denzell	0	0	1	1	1
Own goal(s)				0	0	0	0	—
Total				0	0	2	2	—

=== Assists ===
Includes all competitions. The list is sorted by squad number when total assists are equal. Players with no assists are not included in the list.

As of 21 August 2023

Rk.	No.	Pos.	Player	I-League	Federation Cup	Durand Cup	Total
1	19	DF	(India) Sairuat Kima	0	0	1	1
1	22	FW	(Ghana) Richardson Denzell	0	0	1	1
Total				0	0	2	2

=== Clean sheets ===
Includes all competitions. The list is sorted by squad number when total clean sheets are equal. Numbers in parentheses represent games where both goalkeepers participated and both kept a clean sheet; the number in parentheses is awarded to the goalkeeper who was substituted on, whilst a full clean sheet is awarded to the goalkeeper who was on the field at the start of play. Goalkeepers with no clean sheets not included in the list.

As of 21 August 2023

Rk.	No.	Pos.	Player	I-League	Federation Cup	Durand Cup	Total
1	1	GK	(India) Sachin Jha	0	0	2	2
Total				0	0	2	2
