= 2023–24 Delhi FC season =

Indian association football club

Delhi FC
2023–24 season
- Owner: Ranjit Bajaj
- Head coach: Yan Law
- Stadium: Ambedkar Stadium
- I-League: 6th
- Durand Cup: Group Stage
- Federation Cup: TBD

The 2023–24 season was the first season for Delhi FC in the I-League.

In May 2023, the club clinched their first ever I-League 2 title, and gained promotion to I-League, and became the first team from Delhi to get promoted to I-League on sporting merit. The club appointed Yan Law as the head coach on 26 June 2023. On 30 June, it was confirmed that Delhi would participate in the 132nd edition of the Durand Cup.

== Personnel ==
Current technical staff
Position	Name
Owner	(India) Ranjit Bajaj
Team manager	(India) Anish Shetty
Head coach	(India) Yan Law
Assistant coach	(India) Israil Gurung
Assistant coach	(India) Anwar Ali Sr.
Goalkeeping coach	(India) Mannu Rao
Physio	(India) Bhusan Dahikar

== Players ==
Note: Flags indicate national team as defined under FIFA eligibility rules; some limited exceptions apply. Players may hold more than one non-FIFA nationality.

No.	Pos.	Nation	Player
1	GK	IND	Pawan Kumar
3	DF	IND	Gurtej Singh
4	DF	TJK	Alisher Kholmurodov
6	MF	IND	Vanlalhriatzuala K.
7	FW	JPN	Takuto Miki
8	MF	IND	Dhruv Sharma
9	MF	IND	Vinil Poojary
10	FW	BRA	Sérgio Barboza
11	FW	IND	Himanshu Jangra
12	MF	SEN	Pape Gassama
15	FW	IND	Balwant Singh
16	FW	BRA	Hudson Jesus
17	DF	IND	Kitboklang Khyriem
21	GK	IND	Nitish Mehra
22	FW	IND	Bali Gagandeep

No.	Pos.	Nation	Player
25	FW	UZB	Shokhrukhbek Muratov
26	MF	IND	Gaurav Rawat
27	FW	IND	Ankit Singh
28	MF	IND	Naorem Tondomba Singh (on loan from Mumbai City)
32	GK	IND	Naveen Kumar
33	DF	IND	Munmun Lugun
47	DF	IND	Raju Gaikwad
49	MF	IND	Girik Khosla
60	MF	IND	Suprodip Hazra
67	MF	IND	Rahul Rawat
84	MF	IND	Bhupinder Singh
—	MF	IND	Fahad Temuri

== Reserve players ==
Note: Flags indicate national team as defined under FIFA eligibility rules; some limited exceptions apply. Players may hold more than one non-FIFA nationality.

No.	Pos.	Nation	Player
4	MF	IND	Kartik Kanojia
14	FW	IND	Krishna Pandit
18	MF	IND	Abhay Gurung
24	DF	IND	Koushik Sarkar
55	MF	IND	Akash Tirkey
—	MF	IND	Kuntal Pakhira
—	MF	IND	Lalengmawia
—	GK	IND	Calvin Abhishek
—	FW	IND	Tarun Slathia

=== Contract extension ===
Date	No	Pos	Player	Ref
21 June 2023	33	DF	(India) Munmun Lugun	
22 June 2023	15	FW	(India) Balwant Singh	
23 June 2023	03	DF	(India) Gurtej Singh	
28 June 2023	05	MF	(India) Suprodip Hazra	
30 June 2023	06	MF	(India) Vanlalhriatzuala	
1 July 2023	12	MF	(India) Fahad Temuri	
7 July 2023	32	DF	(India) Kitboklang Khyriem	
7 July 2023	19	MF	(India) Dhruv Sharma	
7 July 2023	67	MF	(India) Rahul Rawat	
8 July 2023	18	MF	(India) Abhay Gurung	
8 July 2023		MF	(India) Kuntal Pakhira	
9 July 2023	26	MF	(India) Gaurav Rawat	
10 July 2023		MF	(India) Kartik Kanojia	
10 July 2023		MF	(India) Gwgwmsar Gayari	
11 July 2023	84	MF	(India) Bhupinder Singh	
11 July 2023	23	GK	(India) Nitish Mehra	
26 July 2023		FW	(India) Krishna Pandit	

== Transfers ==
=== In ===
Date	Pos	Player	Transferred from	Fee	Ref
27 June 2023	FW	(India) Himanshu Jangra	(India) East Bengal	Loan Return	
29 June 2023	FW	(India) Azharuddin Mallick	(India) Mohammedan	Free Agent	
30 June 2023	MF	(India) Vinil Poojary	(India) Bengaluru United	Free Agent	
7 July 2023	GK	(India) James Kithan	(India) Gokulam Kerala	Free Agent	
7 July 2023	DF	(India) Raju Gaikwad	(India) Churchill Brothers	Free Agent	
9 July 2023	DF	(India) Koushik Sarkar	(India) Bhawanipore	Free Agent	
9 July 2023	MF	(India) Prakash Sarkar	(India) Real Kashmir	Free Agent	
14 July 2023	MF	(India) Lalengmawia	(India)	Free Agent	
17 July 2023	MF	(India) Girik Khosla	(India) Real Kashmir	Free Agent	
27 July 2023	FW	(India) Ankit Singh	(India) Techtro Swades United	Free Agent	
30 July 2023	DF	(Egypt) Alaa Nasr	(Maldives) TC Sports	Free Agent	
3 August 2023	GK	(India) Calvin Abhishek	(India) Peerless	Free Agent	
3 August 2023	GK	(India) Pawan Kumar	(India) East Bengal	Free Agent	
14 August 2023	FW	(Brazil) Sérgio Barboza	(United States) Nona FC	Free Agent	
18 August 2023	MF	(Senegal) Pape Gassama	(United States) Nona FC	Free Agent	
23 August 2023	FW	(Brazil) Hudson Jesus	(Brazil) Trem	Free Agent	
26 August 2023	FW	(India) Tarun Slathia	(India) Jagat Singh Palahi FC	Free Agent	
31 August 2023	GK	(India) Naveen Kumar	(India) FC Goa	Free Agent	
22 December 2023	MF	(Spain) Joseba Beitia		Free Agent	
31 January 2024	FW	(Uzbekistan) Shokhrukhbek Muratov	(Kyrgyzstan) FC Alay Osh	Free Transfer	
31 January 2024	FW	(Japan) Takuto Miki		Free Agent	
31 January 2024	DF	(Tajikistan) Alisher Kholmurodov	(Tajikistan) Regar-TadAZ	Free Agent	

=== Loaned in ===
Date	Pos	Player	Loaned from	Fee	Ref
19 June 2023	MF	(India) Naorem Tondomba Singh	Mumbai City		

=== Out ===
Date	Pos	Player	Transferred to	Fee	Ref
1 June 2023	DF	(India) Bikram Pradhan	Bhawanipore	Free Agent	
9 June 2023	GK	(India) Susnata Malick	Diamond Harbour	Free Agent	
1 July 2023	FW	(India) Nirmal Singh Bisht	(India) Garhwal FC	Loan Return	
7 July 2023	DF	(India) Karandeep Singh	Mohammedan	Free Agent	
18 July 2023	MF	(India) Muhammed Inayath		Free Agent	
18 July 2023	MF	(India) Neeraj Bhandari	(India) Garhwal FC	Free Agent	
18 July 2023	MF	(India) Jibin Devassy		Free Agent	
18 July 2023	FW	(India) Ajay Singh		Free Agent	
18 July 2023	FW	(India) Manvir Singh}		Free Agent	
18 July 2023	MF	(India) Thingnam Radhakanta Singh		Free Agent	
18 July 2023	GK	(India) Vigneshwaran Baskaran		Free Agent	
14 September 2023	DF	(India) Wangkhei Olen Singh	NEROCA	Free Agent	
14 September 2023	MF	(India) Prakash Sarkar	(India) Bhawanipore	Free Transfer	
15 September 2023	MF	(India) Azharuddin Mallick	(India) Bhawanipore	Free Transfer	
05 January 2024	FW	(Brazil) Aroldo DA SILVA	(Malta) Marsa	Free Transfer	
18 January 2024	MF	(Spain) Joseba Beitia	(Panama) UMECIT FC	Free Transfer	
25 January 2024	GK	(India) James Kithan	(India) Mohammedan	Free Transfer	
31 January 2024	DF	(Egypt) Alaaeldin Nasr		Free Agent	

=== Loaned out ===
Start Date	End Date	Pos	Player	Loaned to	Fee	Ref
9 July 2023	31 May 2027	DF	(India) Anwar Ali	Mohun Bagan SG	Undisclosed	

== Pre-season ==
2 August 2023 Friendly	Namdhari	3–5	Delhi FC	Bhaini
08:00 IST			Fahad Temuri; Alaaeldin Nasr; Vinil Poojary; ?	Stadium: Namdhari Football Ground

1 September 2023 Climate Cup	(Tibet) Tibetan NFA	2–4	Delhi FC	Leh
08:30 IST			Himanshu Jangra 15'; Gaurav Rawat 26'; Kartik Kanojia 66'; Girik Khosla 90+4'	Stadium: Spituk Football Stadium

3 September 2023 Climate Cup	Delhi FC	2–1	1 Ladakh FC	Leh
15:30 IST	Himanshu Jangra 38'; Akash Tirkey 79'			Stadium: Spituk Football Stadium

5 September 2023 Climate Cup	UT Ladakh	0–10	Delhi FC	Leh
8:30 IST			Fahad Temuri 3' 45'; Kitboklang Khyriem 10'; Tarun Slathia 59' 69' 78'; Kuntal Pakhira 62' 90+4'; Rahul Rawat 72'; Himanshu Jangra 90+2'	Stadium: Spituk Football Stadium

8 September 2023 Climate Cup	(Tibet) Tibetan NFA	0–6	Delhi FC	Leh
12:45 IST			Akash Tirkey 36'; Tarun Slathia 45+1'; OG 45+8'; Himanshu Jangra 50' 90+3'; Vanlalhriatzuala 74'	Stadium: Spituk Football Stadium

20 September 2023 Chakradhar Cup	Delhi FC	2–0	Assam Police	Nalbari
15:00 IST			Himanshu Jangra 66'; Aroldinho 90+5'	Stadium: Nalbari Ground

22 September 2023 Chakradhar Cup	Delhi FC	0–0 (3–1 p)	Indian Oil FC	Nalbari
15:00 IST		Report		Stadium: Nalbari Ground

24 September 2023 Chakradhar Cup	Delhi FC	1–2	Shillong Lajong	Nalbari
15:00 IST	Akash Tirkey 80'	Report		Stadium: Nalbari Ground

== Competitions ==
=== Overview ===
Competition	First match	Last match	Starting round	Final position	Record							
Competition	First match	Last match	Starting round	Final position	Pld	W	D	L	GF	GA	GD	Win %
I-League	30 October 2023	13 April 2024	Match day 1	6th	24	11	2	11	44	40	+4	45.83
Durand Cup	6 August 2023	18 August 2023	Group stage	Group stage	3	0	2	1	3	4	−1	0.00
Total					27	11	4	12	47	44	+3	40.74

Source: Competitions

=== I-League ===
==== League table ====
Pos	Team	Pld	W	D	L	GF	GA	GD	Pts
4	Inter Kashi	24	11	8	5	47	41	+6	41
5	Real Kashmir	24	11	7	6	36	19	+17	40
6	Delhi	24	11	2	11	44	40	+4	35
7	Churchill Brothers	24	9	6	9	40	31	+9	33
8	Shillong Lajong	24	8	7	9	36	37	−1	31

Source: I-League
Rules for classification: 1) Points; 2) Head-to-head points; 3) Head-to-head goal difference; 4) Total goal difference; 5) Total number of goals scored; 6) drawing of lots
(Note: Head-to-head record is used only after all the matches between the teams in question have been played).

==== Matches ====
Note: I-League announced the fixtures for the 2023–24 season on 6 October 2023.

30 October 2023 1	Delhi	1–1	TRAU	Bhaini Ala
14:00 IST	Balwant Singh 47'	Report	Liton Shil 29'	Stadium: Namdhari Stadium

2 November 2023 2	Delhi	4–3	Rajasthan United	Bhaini Ala
14:00 IST	Aroldinho 3', 44'; Gurtej Singh 33'; Sérgio Barboza 53' (pen.)	Report	Yash Tripathi 13', 66', 68'	Stadium: Namdhari Stadium; Man of the Match: Yash Tripathi (Rajasthan United)

10 November 2023 3	Delhi	1–2	Mohammedan	Bhaini Ala
14:00 IST	Bali Gagandeep 90+8'	Report	Gurtej Singh 4' (o.g.); Lalremsanga Fanai 13'	Stadium: Namdhari Stadium; Man of the Match: Padam Chatri

17 November 2023 4	Aizawl	1–5	Delhi	Aizawl
16:30 IST	R Lalthanmawia 46'	Report	Gaurav Rawat 14', 23'; Aroldinho 61'; Sérgio Barboza 76'; Alaaeldin Nasr 86'	Stadium: Rajiv Gandhi Stadium; Man of the Match: Gaurav Rawat

22 November 2023 5	Shillong Lajong	2–1	Delhi	Shillong
16:30 IST	Abdou Karim 24'; Phrangki Buam 82'	Report	Gaurav Rawat 60'	Stadium: SSA Stadium; Man of the Match: Phrangki Buam (Shillong)

27 November 2023 6	Delhi	3–4	NEROCA	Bhaini Ala
14:00 IST	Aroldinho 81'; Sérgio Barboza 85', 90'	Report	Tangva Ragui 16'; Balwinder Singh 73'; David Singh 77'; Aniket Panchal 78'	Stadium: Namdhari Stadium; Man of the Match: David Simbo (NEROCA)

1 December 2023 7	Delhi	2–1	Churchill Brothers	Bhaini Ala
14:00 IST	Sérgio Barboza 47'; Ponif Vaz 87' (o.g.)	Report	Martín Cháves 24'	Stadium: Namdhari Stadium; Man of the Match: Pape Gassama (Delhi)

5 December 2023 8	Namdhari	1–2	Delhi	Bhaini Ala
14:00 IST	Sehajdeep Singh 90+9'	Report	Bali Gagandeep 3'; Hudson Jesus 68' (pen.)	Stadium: Namdhari Stadium; Man of the Match: Bali Gagandeep (Delhi)

11 December 2023 9	Sreenidi Deccan	1–0	Delhi	Hyderabad
19:30 IST	Bali Gagandeep 64' (o.g.)			Stadium: Deccan Arena

15 December 2023 10	Inter Kashi	2–0	Delhi	Kalyani
19:30 IST	Md. Asif 14'; Jordon Lamela 36'	Report		Stadium: Kalyani Stadium; Man of the Match: Jordon Lamela (Inter Kashi)

24 December 2023 11	Delhi	1–0	Real Kashmir	Bhaini Ala
14:00 IST	Jesus 77'	Report		Stadium: Namdhari Stadium; Attendance: 918; Referee: Tanmoy Dhar; Man of the Match: Hudson Jesus (Delhi)

11 February 2024 13	TRAU	5–3	Delhi	Kalyani
19:00 IST	Liton Shil 5', 73'; Danish Aribam 64', 71' (pen.); Robinson 75'	Report	Balwant Singh 2'; Shokhrukhbek Muratov 41'; Sérgio Barboza 59' (pen.)	Stadium: Kalyani Stadium; Attendance: 128; Referee: Pratik Mondal; Man of the Match: Danish Aribam (TRAU)

15 February 2024 14	Delhi	1–0	Aizawl	Bhaini Ala
14:00 IST	Barboza 90+3'	Report		Stadium: Namdhari Stadium; Attendance: 150; Referee: Jehrul Islam; Man of the Match: Sérgio Barboza (Delhi)

19 February 2024 12	Delhi	1–2	Gokulam Kerala	Bhaini Ala
14:00 IST	Nidhin 85' (o.g.)	Report	Álex Sánchez 85' (pen.); Lalliansanga Renthlei 90+3'	Stadium: Namdhari Stadium; Attendance: 200; Referee: Pratik Mondal; Man of the Match: Lalliansanga Renthlei (Gokulam Kerala)

23 February 2024 15	NEROCA	1–2	Delhi	Shillong
19:00 IST		Report	Shokhrukhbek Muratov 4'; Rahul Rawat 21'	Stadium: SSA Stadium; Attendance: 100; Referee: Jatinder Singh; Man of the Match: Shokhrukhbek Muratov (Delhi)

27 February 2024 16	Churchill Brothers	2–0	Delhi	Vasco
19:00 IST	Louis 12' (pen.), 20'	Report		Stadium: Tilak Maidan; Attendance: 921; Referee: Arvind Sekhar A. Man of the Match: Ogana Louis (Churchill Brothers)

3 March 2024 17	Delhi	2–3	Namdhari	Bhaini Ala
14:00 IST	Alisher Kholmurodov 75'; Bali Gagandeep 90'		Harpreet Singh 73'; Iván Garrido 76'; Akashdeep Singh 90+2'	Stadium: Namdhari Stadium; Attendance: 500; Referee: K. Ramdasan; Man of the Match: Akashdeep Singh (Namdhari)

10 March 2024 18	Delhi	0–1	Sreenidi Deccan	Bhaini Ala
14:00 IST		Report	Lalromawia 23'	Stadium: Namdhari Stadium; Attendance: 250; Referee: K. Lyngdoh Nongum; Man of the Match: Lalromawia (Sreenidi Deccan)

13 March 2024 19	Delhi	0–2	Inter Kashi	Bhaini Ala
15:30 IST		Report	Haobam 76'; Hartley 79'	Stadium: Namdhari Stadium; Referee: Surojit Das; Man of the Match: Peter Hartley (Delhi)

17 March 2024 20	Real Kashmir	1–1	Delhi	Srinagar
14:00 IST	Gurtej Singh 52'	Report	Anwar Ali Sr 82' (o.g.)	Stadium: TRC Turf Ground; Attendance: 1,635; Referee: Jatinder Singh; Man of the Match: Gurtej Singh (Real Kashmir)

23 March 2024 21	Gokulam Kerala	0–2	Delhi	Kozhikode
19:00 IST		Report	Barboza 59', 87'	Stadium: EMS Stadium; Attendance: 1,100; Referee: I. Jamal Mohamed; Man of the Match: Sérgio Barboza (Delhi)

28 March 2024 22	Delhi	3–1	Shillong Lajong	Bhaini Ala
15:30 IST	Barboza 65' (pen.), 75', 90+3'	Report	Lyngdoh 90+5'	Stadium: Namdhari Stadium; Attendance: 200; Referee: Mrutyunjay Amatya; Man of the Match: Sérgio Barboza (Delhi)

5 April 2024 23	Rajasthan United	3–6	Delhi	Bhaini Ala
15:30 IST	Denzell 20', 73'; Gupta 90+3'	Report	Poojary 8'; Kholmurodov 39'; NT Singh 44'; A. Singh 65' (o.g.), 87' (o.g.); Dias 89'	Stadium: Namdhari Stadium; Attendance: 200; Referee: Akashkumar Mehta; Man of the Match: Hudson Jesus (Delhi)

13 April 2024 24	Mohammedan	1–3	Delhi	Naihati
18:00 IST	Mirjalol Kasimov 90+9'	Report	Kholmurodov 7'; Goyary 31'; Barboza 90+8'	Stadium: Naihati Stadium; Attendance: 24,678; Referee: Jehrul Islam; Man of the Match: Alisher Kholmurodov (Delhi)

=== Group E ===
Pos	Team	Pld	W	D	L	GF	GA	GD	Pts	Qualification	CHN	HYD	DEL	(Nepal) TRI
1	Chennaiyin	3	3	0	0	8	2	+6	9	Qualify for the knockout stage	—	—	—	3–0
2	Hyderabad	3	1	1	1	5	4	+1	4		1–3	—	—	3–0
3	Delhi	3	0	2	1	3	4	−1	2		1–2	1–1	—	1–1
4	(Nepal) Tribhuvan Army	3	0	1	2	1	7	−6	1		—	—	—	—

Source: Twitter
Rules for classification: Group stage tiebreakers

==== Matches ====
6 August 2023 1	Delhi	1–1	Hyderabad	Guwahati
14.30 IST	Jangra 6'	Report	Ramhlunchhunga 57'	Stadium: Indira Gandhi Athletic Stadium; Attendance: 1,253; Referee: Crystal John; Man of the Match: Ramhlunchhunga (Hyderabad)

9 August 2023 2	Delhi	1–1	(Nepal) Tribhuvan Army	Kokrajhar
14.30 IST	Khosla 88'	Report	D. Henjan 39'	Stadium: SAI Stadium; Referee: Ashwin

18 August 2023 3	Delhi	1–2	Chennaiyin	Guwahati
15.00 IST	Pape Gassama 54'	Report	Rafael Crivellaro 38'; Vincy Barretto 51'	Stadium: Indira Gandhi Athletic Stadium; Man of the Match: Vanlalhriatzuala K (Delhi FC)

== Statistics ==
=== Goalscorers ===
Rank	No.	Pos.	Nationality	Player	I League	Durand Cup	Total
1	10	FW	(Brazil)	Sérgio Barboza	12	0	12
2	13	FW	(Brazil)	Aroldo DA SILVA	3	0	3
2	26	MF	(India)	Gaurav Rawat	4	0	4
4	4	DF	(Tajikistan)	Alisher Kholmurodov	3	0	3
4	16	FW	(Brazil)	Hudson Jesus	3	0	3
4	22	FW	(India)	Bali Gagandeep	3	0	3
7	3	DF	(India)	Gurtej Singh	2	0	2
7	15	FW	(India)	Balwant Singh	2	0	2
7	25	FW	(Uzbekistan)	Shokhrukhbek Muratov	2	0	2
10	9	FW	(India)	Vinil Poojary	1	0	1
10	11	FW	(India)	Himanshu Jangra	0	1	1
10	12	MF	(Senegal)	Pape Gassama	0	1	1
10	19	DF	(Egypt)	Alaaeldin Nasr	1	0	1
10	28	MF	(India)	Naorem Tondomba Singh	1	0	1
10	67	MF	(India)	Rahul Rawat	1	0	1
10	49	FW	(India)	Girik Khosla	0	1	1
10		MF	(India)	Gwgwmsar Gayary	1	0	1
Own Goals					4	0	4
Totals					41	3	44
