= 2023–24 Gokulam Kerala FC season =

Indian football club season

Gokulam Kerala
2023–24 season
- Chairman: Gokulam Gopalan
- Head Coach: Mingo Oramas (until 31 March 2024); Sereef Khan (from 31 March 2024)
- Stadium: EMS Stadium
- I-League: 3rd
- Durand Cup: Quarter Final
- Super Cup: Group Stage
- Top goalscorer: League: Álex Sánchez; 19 Goals; All: Álex Sánchez; 20 Goals
- Highest home attendance: 19,764
- Lowest home attendance: 2,000
- Average home league attendance: 8,760
- Biggest win: 5-0 (vs Rajasthan United (H), 09 November 2023, I-League)
- All statistics correct as of 13 April 2024.

The 2023–24 season is Gokulam Kerala's seventh season since its establishment in 2017 and their sixth season in the I-League. In addition to the I-League, Gokulam Kerala will participate in the Indian Super Cup and Durand Cup. on 6 June 2023, Spanish manager Mingo Oramas agreed a two-year deal to become GKFC manager. On 30 June 2023, the organization committee announced that Gokulam is participating in the Asia's oldest football tournament, Durand cup. The organizers of the 132nd Durand Cup football tournament announced the groups for the 24-participating teams, with defending champions Bengaluru clubbed with two popular Kerala sides Kerala Blasters and 2019 champions Gokulam Kerala in Group C, to be held in Kolkata. The Indian Air Force is the fourth side in the group. On 5 August 2023, gokulam announced 22 member squad for durand cup Gokulam Kerala confirmed their Participation in Super cup along with other 5 I-league clubs. On 31 March, it was announced that GKFC had sacked head coach Domingo oramas following their defeat to Delhi FC.

== Current technical staff ==
| Position | Name |
|---|---|
| Head coach | |
| Assistant Coach | (India) Shereef Khan |
| Fitness and conditioning Coach | |
| Technical Director | Vacant |
| Goalkeeping Coach | (India) Sandip Nandy |
| Team Manager | (India) Aravind AR |

== First-team squad ==
| Squad no. | Name | Nationality | Position(s) | Age | Previous club | Since | Apps | Goals | Assists |
Goalkeepers
| 1 | Bishorjit Singh | (India) | GK | 31 | (India) TRAU | 2023 | 4 | 0 | 0 |
| 21 | Avilash Paul | (India) | GK | 28 | (India) Mohun Bagan SG | 2023 | 14 | 0 | 0 |
| 35 | Devansh Dabas | (India) | GK | 22 | (India) Chennaiyin(Loan) | 2023 | 10 | 0 | 0 |
Defenders
| 2 | Salam Ranjan Singh | (India) | CB | 27 | (India) TRAU | 2023 | 21 | 0 | 1 |
| 3 | Saurabh Meher | (India) | RB/LB | 23 | (India) GKFC Reserves | 2022 | 2 | 0 | 0 |
| 4 | Vikas Saini | (India) | RB | 26 | (India) Churchill Brothers | 2022 | 31 | 0 | 1 |
| 5 | Nidhin Krishna | (India) | CB/ RB | 24 | (India) Kerala United | 2023 | 25 | 1 | 0 |
| 12 | Laishram Johnson | (India) | RB/LB | 18 | (India) Sagolband United | 2023 | 7 | 1 | 0 |
| 15 | Abdul Hakku | (India) | CB/ RB | 28 | (India) Real Kashmir | 2022 | 36 | 2 | 1 |
| 17 | Aminou Bouba | (Cameroon) | CB | 32 | (Cameroon) Eding Sport FC | 2021 | 75 | 5 | 2 |
| 33 | Muhammad Saheef | (India) | LB | 20 | (India) Kerala Blasters(Loan) | 2023 | 23 | 0 | 1 |
| 45 | Anas Edathodika | (India) | CB | 37 | | 2023 | 4 | 0 | 0 |
| 66 | Mashoor Shereef | (India) | CB/RB | 31 | (India) Punjab | 2024 | 3 | 0 | 0 |
| 93 | Akhil Praveen | (India) | CB | 28 | (India) Kerala United | 2022 | 17 | 0 | 0 |
MidFielders
| 6 | Rishad PP | (India) | CM | 27 | (India) GKFC Reserves | 2021 | 44 | 2 | 4 |
| 10 | Pitu Viera | (Spain) | AM | 26 | (Spain) La Unión Atlético | 2024 | 6 | 1 | 1 |
| 20 | Nikola Stojanović | (Serbia) | CM | 28 | (India) Mohammedan | 2024 | 11 | 5 | 1 |
| 29 | Noufal PN | (India) | AM | 22 | (India) GKFC Reserves | 2022 | 53 | 5 | 16 |
| 42 | Abhijith Kurungodan | (India) | CM | 26 | (India) GKFC Reserves | 2021 | 37 | 4 | 4 |
| 44 | Basit Ahmed Bhat | (India) | LM | 25 | (India) Downtown Heroes | 2023 | 13 | 0 | 0 |
| 46 | Christy Davis | (India) | CM | 24 | (India) Mohammedan | 2023 | 12 | 0 | 1 |
| 77 | Lalliansanga Renthlei | (India) | CM | 24 | (India) Odisha(Loan) | 2023 | 3 | 1 | 0 |
| 99 | Calvin Baretto | (India) | CM | 23 | (India) GKFC Reserves | 2023 | 1 | 0 | 0 |
Forwards
| 7 | Komron Tursunov | (Tajikistan) | FW | 27 | (India) TRAU | 2023 | 20 | 6 | 2 |
| 8 | Sreekuttan VS | (India) | FW | 24 | (India) Kerala blasters | 2022 | 71 | 7 | 7 |
| 9 | Senthamil Shanbagam | (India) | FW | 22 | (India) Chennaiyin | 2023 | 7 | 0 | 0 |
| 11 | Sourav K | (India) | FW | 22 | (India) GKFC Reserves | 2021 | 45 | 4 | 3 |
| 22 | Shijin Thadhayouse | (India) | FW | 21 | (India) SAI | 2022 | 22 | 3 | 1 |
| 25 | Matija Babović | (Serbia) | FW | 24 | (Slovenia) Petržalka | 2024 | 11 | 5 | 1 |
| 38 | Álex Sánchez | (Spain) | FW | 34 | (Spain) Ejea | 2023 | 28 | 20 | 9 |

== New contracts ==
| Date | Position | No. | Player | Ref. |
|---|---|---|---|---|
| 20 June 2023 | MF | 06 | (India) Rishad PP | |

== Transfers and loans ==
=== Transfers in ===
| Entry date | Position | Player | Previous club | Fee | Ref. |
|---|---|---|---|---|---|
| 4 June 2023 | MF | (India) basudeb mandi | (India) United SC | None | |
| 16 June 2023 | MF | (Spain) Nili Perdomo | (Greece) Kallithea | None | |
| 22 June 2023 | MF | (India) Rahul Raju | (India) Bengaluru FC | None | |
| 10 July 2023 | DF | (India) Laishram Johnson Singh | (India) Sagolband United FC | None | |
| 11 July 2023 | DF | (India) Nidhin Krishna | (India) Kerala United FC | None | |
| 13 July 2023 | DF | (India) Salam Ranjan Singh | (India) TRAU | None | |
| 13 July 2023 | GK | (India) Bishal Lama | (India) Shillong Lajong | None | |
| 14 July 2023 | GK | (India) Bishorjit Singh | (India) TRAU | None | |
| 18 July 2023 | MF | (India) Basit Ahmed Bhat | (India) Downtown Heroes | None | |
| 19 July 2023 | FW | (India) Naocha Singh Ngangbam | (India) Ksherti Iril | None | |
| 19 July 2023 | GK | (India) Zothanmawia | (India) Mohammedan | None | |
| 20 July 2023 | FW | (India) Naro Hari Shrestha | (India) ARA FC | None | |
| 24 July 2023 | MF | (India) Rahul Khokhar | (India) Bangalore Eagles FC | None | |
| 31 July 2023 | FW | (Spain) Álex Sánchez | (Spain) Ejea | None | |
| 31 July 2023 | MF | (India) Abhijith K | (India) Reserves | None | |
| 31 July 2023 | MF | (India) Calvin Barretto | (India) Reserves | None | |
| 21 August 2023 | FW | (Tajikistan) Komron Tursunov | (India) TRAU | None | |
| 29 August 2023 | MF | (Spain) Edu Bedia | (India) Goa | None | |
| 31 August 2023 | GK | (India) Avilash Paul | (India) Mohun Bagan SG | None | |
| 1 September 2023 | MF | (India) Christy Molly Davis | (India) Mohammedan | None | |
| 6 September 2023 | DF | (India) Muhammed Bilal | (India) Sreenidhi B | None | |
| 8 September 2023 | DF | (India) Muhammed Basit | (India) Southern Samity | None | |
| 14 September 2023 | FW | (India) Azfar Noorani | (India) Mumbai Kenkre | None | |
| 21 September 2023 | GK | (India) Iqbal | | None | |
| 1 October 2023 | FW | (India) Senthamizhi Shanbagam | (India) Chennaiyin | None | |
| 15 October 2023 | DF | (India) Anas Edathodika | Free Agent | None | |
| 2 January 2024 | MF | (Serbia) Nikola Stojanović | Free Agent | None | |
| 20 January 2024 | DF | (India) Mashoor Shereef | (India) Punjab FC | None | |
| 7 February 2024 | MF | (Spain) Pitu Viera | (Spain) La Unión Atlético | None | |
| 9 February 2024 | FW | (Serbia) Matija Babović | (Slovenia) Petržalka | None | |

=== Loan in ===
| Start date | End date | Position | Player | From club | Fee | Ref |
|---|---|---|---|---|---|---|
| 31 August 2023 | 31 May 2024 | FW | (Nigeria) Justine Emmanuel | (India) Kerala Blasters | ₹ 28K | |
| 2 September 2023 | 31 May 2024 | DF | (India) Muhammad Saheef | (India) Kerala Blasters | None | . |
| 3 September 2023 | 31 May 2024 | GK | (India) Devansh Dabas | (India) Chennaiyin | None | |
| 27 January 2024 | 31 May 2024 | MF | (India) Lalliansanga Renthlei | (India) Odisha | None | |

=== Loan out ===
| Start date | End date | Position | Player | To club | Fee | Ref |
|---|---|---|---|---|---|---|
| 8 September 2023 | 31 May 2024 | MF | (India) Arjun Jayaraj | (India) Sporting Club Bengaluru | None | |
| 11 October 2023 | 31 May 2024 | MF | (India) Rahul Raju | (India) Churchill Brothers | None | |
| 10 January 2024 | 31 May 2024 | MF | (India) Dilip Oraon | (India) United SC | None | |

=== Transfers out ===
| Exit date | Position | No. | Player | To club | Fee | Ref. |
|---|---|---|---|---|---|---|
| 1 June 2023 | MF | 23 | (Afghanistan) Farshad Noor | Brunei DPMM | Free Agent | |
| 1 June 2023 | DF | 66 | (India) Sajad Hussain Parray | (India) Hyderabad | Loan Return | |
| 1 June 2023 | MF | 99 | (India) Rahul Raju | (India) Bengaluru | Loan Return | |
| 1 June 2023 | GK | 42 | (India) Shibinraj Kunniyil | (India) Indian Air Force | Loan Return | |
| 19 June 2023 | DF | 02 | (India) Subhankar Adhikari | (India) Sreenidi Deccan | Free Agent | |
| 1 July 2023 | MF | 50 | (India) Tanmoy Ghosh | (India) Mohammedan | Free Agent | |
| 3 July 2023 | FW | 19 | (India) Jobby Justin | (India) Bhawanipore | Free Agent | |
| 3 July 2023 | MF | 14 | (India) Jijo Joseph | (India) Bhawanipore | Free Agent | |
| 7 July 2023 | GK | 40 | (India) James Kithan | (India) Delhi | Free Agent | |
| 25 July 2023 | FW | 70 | (Spain) Sergio Mendigutxia | (Sweden) AFC Eskilstuna | Free Agent | |
| 3 August 2023 | DF | 05 | (India) Pawan Kumar | (India) Sreenidi Deccan | Free Agent | |
| 5 August 2023 | GK | 01 | (India) Bilal Khan | (India) Churchill Brothers | Free Agent | |
| 21 August 2023 | MF | 47 | (Spain) Omar Ramos | | Free Agent | |
| 21 August 2023 | MF | 10 | (Brazil) Kaká | | Free Agent | |
| 21 August 2023 | FW | 09 | (Ghana) Samuel Mensah Koney | | Free Agent | |
| 16 September 2023 | DF | 3 | (India) Mohammed Jassim | (India) Mohammedan | Free Agent | |
| 11 October 2023 | GK | 21 | (India) Zothanmawia | (India) Chhinga Veng | Free Agent | |
| 11 October 2023 | MF | 7 | (India) Thahir Zaman | (India) Real Malabar FC | Free Agent | |
| 11 October 2023 | MF | 18 | (India) Shilton D'Silva | (India) Income Tax Bengaluru | Free Agent | |
| 11 October 2023 | FW | 14 | (India) Naro Hari Shrestha | (India) Diamond Harbour FC | Free Agent | |
| 28 October 2023 | GK | | (India) Bishal Lama | (India) Shillong Lajong | None | |
| 21 December 2023 | MF | 10 | (Spain) Nili Perdomo | (Greece) Chania | None | |
| 10 January 2024 | FW | | (India) Ngangom Ronald Singh | (India) Bengaluru United | None | |
| 10 January 2024 | FW | | (India) Naocha Singh Ngangbam | (India) Bengaluru United | None | |
| 16 January 2024 | MF | 23 | (Spain) Edu Bedia | (Spain) Gimnàstic | None | |
| 27 January 2024 | MF | 53 | (India) Azfar Noorani | (India) Mumbai Kenkre | Free Transfer | |
| 29 January 2024 | FW | 14 | (Nigeria) Justine Emmanuel | (India) Kerala Blasters | Loan Return | |

== Pre-season ==
| 2 August 2023 Friendly | Gokulam Kerala | 0-1 | Kerala Police | Kozhikode |
| 16:00 IST | | | | Stadium: EMS Stadium |

| 17 August 2023 Friendly | Jamshedpur | 2–0 | Gokulam Kerala | Jamshedpur |
| 18:00 IST | Tachikawa; Stevanović | Report | | Stadium: Flatlets Training Ground |
Note: The match was abandoned due to heavy rain around the 75th-minute mark.

| 3 September 2023 Friendly | Gokulam Kerala | 1–0 | Indian Navy | Kozhikode |
| 16.00 IST | | | | Stadium: EMS Stadium |

| 6 September 2023 Friendly | Gokulam Kerala | 1–1 | Odisha | Bhubaneswar |
| 16.00 IST |

| 9 September 2023 Friendly | Goa | 1-0 | Gokulam Kerala | Margao |
| 17.30 IST |

== Competitions ==
=== Overview ===
| Competition | First match | Last match | Starting round | Final position | Record | | | | | | | |
| Competition | First match | Last match | Starting round | Final position | Pld | W | D | L | GF | GA | GD | Win % |
|---|---|---|---|---|---|---|---|---|---|---|---|---|
| I-League | 28 October 2023 | 12 April 2024 | Match Day 1 | 3RD | 24 | 12 | 6 | 6 | 55 | 34 | +21 | 50.00 |
| Durand Cup | 9 August 2023 | 25 August 2023 | Group stage | Quarter finals | 4 | 2 | 0 | 2 | 7 | 7 | +0 | 50.00 |
| Indian Super Cup | 11 January 2024 | 21 January 2024 | Group Stage | Group Stage | 3 | 0 | 1 | 2 | 1 | 4 | −3 | 0.00 |
| Total | | | | | 31 | 14 | 7 | 10 | 63 | 45 | +18 | 45.16 |

Last updated: 12 April 2024
Source: Competitions

=== I-League ===
==== League table ====
| Pos | Team | Pld | W | D | L | GF | GA | GD | Pts | Qualification |
|---|---|---|---|---|---|---|---|---|---|---|
| 1 | Mohammedan (C, P) | 24 | 15 | 7 | 2 | 44 | 22 | +22 | 52 | Promotion to Indian Super League |
| 2 | Sreenidi Deccan | 24 | 14 | 6 | 4 | 54 | 26 | +28 | 48 | |
| 3 | Gokulam Kerala | 24 | 12 | 6 | 6 | 55 | 34 | +21 | 42 | |
| 4 | Inter Kashi | 24 | 11 | 8 | 5 | 47 | 41 | +6 | 41 | |
| 5 | Real Kashmir | 24 | 11 | 7 | 6 | 36 | 19 | +17 | 40 | |

Source: I-League
Rules for classification: 1) Points; 2) Head-to-head points; 3) Head-to-head goal difference; 4) Total goal difference; 5) Total number of goals scored; 6) drawing of lots
(Note: Head-to-head record is used only after all the matches between the teams in question have been played).
(C) Champions; (P) Promoted

==== Results by round ====
| Round | 1 | 2 | 3 | 4 | 5 | 6 | 7 | 8 | 9 | 10 | 11 | 12 | 13 | 14 | 15 | 16 | 17 | 18 | 19 | 20 | 21 | 22 | 23 | 24 |
|---|---|---|---|---|---|---|---|---|---|---|---|---|---|---|---|---|---|---|---|---|---|---|---|---|
| Ground | H | H | H | A | A | H | H | A | A | A | A | A | H | A | A | A | A | H | H | H | H | H | A | H |
| Result | D | W | W | W | L | D | D | D | L | D | W | W | W | W | W | W | L | L | D | W | L | L | W | W |
| Position | 5 | 3 | 1 | 1 | 3 | 5 | 5 | 6 | 7 | 6 | 6 | 4 | 4 | 3 | 2 | 2 | 3 | 4 | 4 | 3 | 4 | 5 | 5 | 3 |

Updated to match(es) played on 12 April 2024. Source:
A = Away; H = Home; W = Win; D = Draw; L = Loss

==== Matches ====
Note: I-League announced the fixtures for the 2023–24 season on 6 October 2023.

| 28 October 2023 1 | Gokulam Kerala | 2-2 | Inter Kashi | Kozhikode |
| 19.00 IST | Álex Sánchez 8'; Noufal PN 54' | Report | Lalrindika 30'; Asif 90+2' | Stadium: EMS Stadium; Attendance: 19,764; Man of the Match: Álex Sánchez (Gokulam) |

| 5 November 2023 2 | Gokulam Kerala | 4-1 | NEROCA | Kozhikode |
| 19.00 IST | Nili Perdomo 28'; Álex Sánchez 48', 86' (pen.); Justine Emmanuel 84' | Report | David Simbo 83' | Stadium: EMS Stadium; Attendance: 10,485; Referee: K. Ramadasan; Man of the Match: Álex Sánchez (Gokulam) |

| 9 November 2023 3 | Gokulam Kerala | 5-0 | Rajasthan United | Kozhikode |
| 19.00 IST | Komron Tursunov 33'; Álex Sánchez 61', 74', 88'; Sreekuttan VS 69' | Report | | Stadium: EMS Stadium; Attendance: 4,318; Man of the Match: Álex Sánchez (Gokulam) |

| 13 November 2023 4 | TRAU | 0-2 | Gokulam Kerala | Kolkata |
| 16.30 IST | | Report | Álex Sánchez 1', 16' | Stadium: Kalyani Stadium; Man of the Match: Álex Sánchez (Gokulam) |

| 19 November 2023 5 | Shillong Lajong | 3-1 | Gokulam Kerala | Shillong |
| 14.00 IST | Daniel Gonçalves 29'; Renan Paulino 75' (pen.); Hardy Nongbri 90+7' | Report | Nili Perdomo 43' | Stadium: SSA Stadium; Man of the Match: Hardy Nongbri(Shillong) |

| 26 November 2023 6 | Gokulam Kerala | 1-1 | Churchill Brothers | Kozhikode |
| 19.00 IST | Álex Sánchez 72' (pen.) | Report | Richard Costa 37' | Stadium: EMS Stadium; Attendance: 13,425; Man of the Match: Emiliano Callegari (Churchill) |

| 2 December 2023 7 | Gokulam Kerala | 2-2 | Namdhari | Kozhikode |
| 19.00 IST | Noufal PN 35'; Komron Tursunov 81' | Report | Akashdeep Singh 40'; Palwinder Singh 45+3' | Stadium: EMS Stadium; Attendance: 2,000 |

| 8 December 2023 8 | Mohammedan | 1-1 | Gokulam Kerala | Kolkata |
| 19.00 IST | Abdul Hakku 40' (o.g.) | Report | Sreekuttan VS 64' | Stadium: Naihati Stadium; Man of the Match: Mirjalol kasimov (Mohammedan) |

| 11 December 2023 9 | Real Kashmir | 3-0 | Gokulam Kerala | Srinagar |
| 11.00 IST | Gnohere Krizo 31', 64'; Jeremy Laldinpuia 59' | Report | | Stadium: TRC Turf Ground |

| 16 December 2023 10 | Aizawl | 1-1 | Gokulam Kerala | Aizawl |
| 15.00 IST | Lalbiakdika 31' | Report | Álex Sánchez 45+4' | Stadium: Rajiv Gandhi Stadium; Man of the Match: Álex Sánchez (Gokulam) |

| 19 December 2023 11 | Sreenidi Deccan | 1-4 | Gokulam Kerala | Hyderabad |
| 15.00 IST | William Alves 74' (pen.) | Report | Nili Perdomo 9'; Álex Sánchez 39', 52'; Sreekuttan VS 45+1' | Stadium: Deccan Arena; Man of the Match: Álex Sánchez (Gokulam) |

| ~~2 February 2024~~ 12 | Delhi | Postponed | Gokulam Kerala | Bhaini Ala |
| 14.00 IST | | | | Stadium: Namdhari Stadium |
Note: Match postponed due to poor weather and unsafe playing conditions.

| 9 February 2024 13 | Inter Kashi | 2-4 | Gokulam Kerala | Kolkata |
| 19.00 IST | Phijam Vikash Singh 23'; Mari Barco 39', 52' | Report | Álex Sánchez 30'; Abhijith Kurungodan 39'; Nikola Stojanović 74', 90+3' | Stadium: Kalyani Stadium; Attendance: 123; Referee: Pranjal Banerjee; Man of the Match: Nikola Stojanović (Gokulam) |

| 12 February 2024 14 | Gokulam Kerala | 2-0 | Shillong Lajong | Kozhikode |
| 19.00 IST | Sourav K 45+4'; Matija Babović 72' | Report | | Stadium: EMS Stadium; Attendance: 2,500; Referee: Williams Joy Koshiy; Man of the Match: Sourav K (Gokulam) |

| 16 February 2024 15 | Rajasthan United | 1-4 | Gokulam Kerala | Bhaini Ala |
| 19.00 IST | Denzell 9' | | Komron Tursunov 28', 64'; Álex Sánchez 50'; Laishram Johnson 81' | Stadium: Namdhari Stadium; Man of the Match: Komron Tursunov (Gokulam) |

| 19 February 2024 12 | Delhi | 1-2 | Gokulam Kerala | Bhaini Ala |
| 14.00 IST | Nidhin 85' (o.g.) | Report | Álex Sánchez 85' (pen.); Lalliansanga Renthlei 90+3' | Stadium: Namdhari Stadium; Attendance: 200; Referee: Pratik Mondal; Man of the Match: Lalliansanga Renthlei(Gokulam) |

| 24 February 2024 16 | Churchill Brothers | 1-2 | Gokulam Kerala | Vasco |
| 19.00 IST | Ogana Louis 49' | Report | Álex Sánchez 9'; Abhijith Kurungodan 19' | Stadium: Tilak Maidan; Attendance: 1025; Referee: Tanmoy Dhar; Man of the Match: Abhijith Kurungodan(Gokulam) |

| 29 February 2024 17 | Namdhari | 2-1 | Gokulam Kerala | Bhaini Ala |
| 15.30 IST | Harmanpreet 3'; Akashdeep 90+7' | | Sourav K 83' | Stadium: Namdhari Stadium |

| 3 March 2024 18 | Gokulam Kerala | 2-3 | Mohammedan | Kozhikode |
| 19.00 IST | Noufal PN 45+1'; Nidhin Krishna 65' | | Eddie Hernández 16'; Alexis Gómez 23'; David Lalhlansanga 90+7' | Stadium: EMS Stadium |

| 10 March 2024 19 | Gokulam Kerala | 1-1 | Real Kashmir | Kozhikode |
| 19.00 IST | Matija Babović 68' | | Gnohero Krizo 65' | Stadium: EMS Stadium; Man of the Match: Matija Babović (Gokulam) |

| 14 March 2024 20 | Gokulam Kerala | 4-3 | Aizawl | Kozhikode |
| 19.00 IST | Matija Babović 28', 65'; Nikola Stojanović 42'; Pitu Viera 70' | | Lalbiakdika Vanlalvunga 84'; Akhil 45' (o.g.); Lalrinzuala Lalbiaknia 19' | Stadium: EMS Stadium |

| 17 March 2024 21 | Gokulam Kerala | 1-2 | Sreenidi Deccan | Kozhikode |
| 19.00 IST | Nikola Stojanović 44' | | William Alves 48', 72' (pen.) | Stadium: EMS Stadium; Man of the Match: William Alves |

| 23 March 2024 22 | Gokulam Kerala | 0-2 | Delhi | Kozhikode |
| 19.00 IST | | | Sérgio Barboza 59', 87' | Stadium: EMS Stadium; Man of the Match: Sérgio Barboza |

| 7 April 2024 23 | NEROCA | 0-3 | Gokulam Kerala | Shillong |
| 19.00 IST | | | Komron Tursunov 44'; Álex Sánchez 90+1', 90+3' | Stadium: SSA Stadium; Attendance: 100; Referee: KYNSANPHAR LYNGDOH NONGUM; Man of the Match: Álex Sánchez |

| 12 April 2024 24 | Gokulam Kerala | 6-1 | TRAU | Kozhikode |
| 16.30 IST | Álex Sánchez 19'; Noufal PN 28', 34'; Komron Tursunov 39'; Matija Babović 90+2'; Nikola Stojanović 90+4' (pen.) | | Isahak Nuhu Seidu 61' (pen.) | Stadium: EMS Stadium; Man of the Match: Noufal PN |

=== Durand Cup ===
Gokulam Kerala were drawn in the Group C for the 132nd edition of the Durand Cup alongside defending champions Bengaluru FC and popular Kerala side Kerala Blasters

| Pos | Team | Pld | W | D | L | GF | GA | GD | Pts | Qualification | GOK | BEN | KER | IAF |
|---|---|---|---|---|---|---|---|---|---|---|---|---|---|---|
| 1 | Gokulam Kerala | 3 | 2 | 0 | 1 | 6 | 5 | +1 | 6 | Qualify for the knockout stage | — | — | — | 2–0 |
| 2 | Bengaluru | 3 | 1 | 2 | 0 | 5 | 3 | +2 | 5 | | 2–0 | — | 2–2 | 1–1 |
| 3 | Kerala Blasters | 3 | 1 | 1 | 1 | 10 | 6 | +4 | 4 | | 3–4 | — | — | 5–0 |
| 4 | Indian Air Force | 3 | 0 | 1 | 2 | 1 | 8 | −7 | 1 | | — | — | — | — |

Source: Twitter
Rules for classification: Group stage tiebreakers

==== Matches ====
Fixture announced on 22 July 2023

| 9 August 2023 1 | Gokulam Kerala | 2–0 | Indian Air Force | Kolkata |
| 16.45 IST | Sourav 36'; Sreekuttan 67' | Report | | Stadium: Kishore Bharati Krirangan; Referee: K Ramdasan |

| 13 August 2023 2 | Kerala Blasters | 3–4 | Gokulam Kerala | Kolkata |
| 14.30 IST | J. Emmanuel 35'; Das 54'; Luna 77' | Report | Bouba 17'; Sreekuttan 43'; N. Singh 45+1' (o.g.); Abhijith 47' | Stadium: Mohun Bagan Ground; Man of the Match: Nili Perdomo (Gokulam Kerala) |

| 22 August 2023 3 | Bengaluru | 2–0 | Gokulam Kerala | Kolkata |
| 18.00 IST | R. Yadav 58'; Lalpekhlua 89' | Report | | Stadium: Kishore Bharati Krirangan; Man of the Match: Robin Yadav (Bengaluru) |

==== Quarter-final ====
| 25 August 2023 QF | East Bengal | 2-1 | Gokulam Kerala | Kolkata |
| 18:00 IST | J. Elsey 1'; A. Bouba 80' (o.g.) | Report | A. Bouba 57' | Stadium: Vivekananda Yuba Bharati Krirangan |

=== Indian Super Cup ===
Gokulam Kerala entered the competition in the Group Stage, the fixtures were announced on 18 December 2023.

==== Group C ====
| Pos | Team | Pld | W | D | L | GF | GA | GD | Pts | Qualification | MCI | CHE | PFC | GOK |
|---|---|---|---|---|---|---|---|---|---|---|---|---|---|---|
| 1 | Mumbai City | 3 | 3 | 0 | 0 | 6 | 3 | +3 | 9 | Advance to knockout stage | — | 1–0 | 3–2 | 2–1 |
| 2 | Chennaiyin | 3 | 1 | 1 | 1 | 3 | 2 | +1 | 4 | | — | — | 1–1 | 2–0 |
| 3 | Punjab | 3 | 0 | 2 | 1 | 3 | 4 | −1 | 2 | | — | — | — | 0–0 |
| 4 | Gokulam Kerala | 3 | 0 | 1 | 2 | 1 | 4 | −3 | 1 | | — | — | — | — |

Source: AIFF
Rules for classification: 1) points; 2) head-to-head points; 3) head-to-head goal difference; 4) goal difference; 5) number of goals scored; 6) drawing of lots

===== Matches =====
| 11 January 2024 1 | Gokulam Kerala | 1-2 | Mumbai City | Bhubaneshwar |
| 14.00 IST | Álex Sánchez 23' | | Ayush Chhikara 76'; El Khayati 90+7' (pen.) | Stadium: Kalinga Stadium (Pitch 1) |

| 16 January 2024 2 | Gokulam Kerala | 0-2 | Chennaiyin | Bhubaneshwar |
| 14.00 IST | | | | Stadium: Kalinga Stadium (Pitch 1) |

| 21 January 2024 3 | Gokulam Kerala | 0-0 | Punjab | Bhubaneshwar |
| 14.00 IST | | | | Stadium: Kalinga Stadium (Pitch 1) |

== Squad statistics ==
=== Appearances ===
Players with no appearances are not included on the list.

As of match played 12 April 2024

| No. | Pos. | Nat. | Name | I-League | | Super Cup | | Durand Cup | | Total | |
| No. | Pos. | Nat. | Name | Apps | Starts | Apps | Starts | Apps | Starts | Apps | Starts |
|---|---|---|---|---|---|---|---|---|---|---|---|
| 1 | GK | (India) | Bishorjit Singh | 3 | 3 | 1 | 1 | 1 | 1 | 5 | 5 |
| 2 | DF | (India) | Salam Ranjan Singh | 18 | 15 | 0 | 0 | 3 | 2 | 21 | 17 |
| 3 | DF | (India) | Saurabh Meher | 0 | 0 | 0 | 0 | 2 | 2 | 2 | 2 |
| 4 | DF | (India) | Vikas Saini | 11 | 8 | 2 | 0 | 3 | 3 | 16 | 11 |
| 5 | DF | (India) | Nidhin Krishna | 20 | 18 | 3 | 3 | 2 | 2 | 25 | 21 |
| 6 | MF | (India) | Rishad PP | 19 | 10 | 2 | 2 | 0 | 0 | 21 | 12 |
| ~~7~~ | MF | (India) | Rahul Raju | 0 | 0 | 0 | 0 | 4 | 2 | 4 | 2 |
| 7 | FW | (Tajikistan) | Komron Tursunov | 20 | 13 | 0 | 0 | 1 | 1 | 21 | 14 |
| 8 | FW | (India) | Sreekuttan VS | 17 | 10 | 3 | 2 | 4 | 2 | 24 | 14 |
| 9 | FW | (India) | Senthamil Shanbagam | 7 | 1 | 0 | 0 | 0 | 0 | 7 | 1 |
| ~~10~~ | MF | (Spain) | Nili Perdomo | 11 | 9 | 0 | 0 | 4 | 4 | 15 | 13 |
| 10 | MF | (Spain) | Pitu Viera | 6 | 2 | 0 | 0 | 0 | 0 | 6 | 2 |
| 11 | FW | (India) | Sourav K | 15 | 4 | 3 | 0 | 3 | 2 | 21 | 6 |
| 12 | DF | (India) | Laishram Johnson | 6 | 3 | 2 | 1 | - | - | 8 | 4 |
| 13 | DF | (India) | Rahul Khokar | 1 | 0 | 0 | 0 | 0 | 0 | 1 | 0 |
| ~~14~~ | FW | (India) | Naro Hari Shrestha | 0 | 0 | 0 | 0 | 1 | 0 | 1 | 0 |
| ~~14~~ | FW | (Nigeria) | Justine Emmanuel | 8 | 3 | 3 | 2 | - | - | 11 | 5 |
| ~~15~~ | MF | (India) | Arjun Jayaraj | 0 | 0 | 0 | 0 | 1 | 0 | 1 | 0 |
| 15 | DF | (India) | Abdul Hakku | 13 | 12 | 2 | 2 | 0 | 0 | 15 | 14 |
| 17 | DF | (Cameroon) | Aminou Bouba | 12 | 9 | 3 | 3 | 4 | 4 | 19 | 16 |
| ~~18~~ | MF | (India) | Shilton D'Silva | 0 | 0 | 0 | 0 | 3 | 1 | 3 | 1 |
| 20 | MF | (Serbia) | Nikola Stojanović | 9 | 9 | 2 | 2 | 0 | 0 | 11 | 11 |
| ~~21~~ | GK | (India) | Zothanmawia | 0 | 0 | 0 | 0 | 3 | 3 | 3 | 3 |
| 21 | GK | (India) | Avilash Paul | 13 | 11 | 3 | 2 | - | - | 16 | 13 |
| 22 | FW | (India) | Shijin Thadhayouse | 4 | 1 | 0 | 0 | 4 | 2 | 8 | 3 |
| ~~23~~ | MF | (Spain) | Edu Bedia | 10 | 10 | 0 | 0 | - | - | 10 | 10 |
| 25 | FW | (Serbia) | Matija Babović | 12 | 5 | 0 | 0 | 0 | 0 | 12 | 5 |
| 29 | MF | (India) | Noufal PN | 23 | 17 | 3 | 1 | 4 | 2 | 30 | 21 |
| 30 | DF | (India) | Bibin Ajayan | 2 | 1 | 0 | 0 | 0 | 0 | 2 | 1 |
| 33 | DF | (India) | Muhammad Saheef | 21 | 18 | 2 | 2 | - | - | 23 | 20 |
| 35 | GK | (India) | Devansh Dabas | 10 | 10 | 0 | 0 | - | - | 10 | 10 |
| 38 | FW | (Spain) | Álex Sánchez | 22 | 18 | 2 | 2 | 4 | 3 | 28 | 23 |
| 42 | MF | (India) | Abhijith Kurungodan | 22 | 19 | 3 | 3 | 4 | 2 | 29 | 24 |
| 44 | MF | (India) | Basit Ahmed Bhat | 9 | 2 | 2 | 1 | 4 | 4 | 15 | 7 |
| 45 | DF | (India) | Anas Edathodika | 4 | 3 | 0 | 0 | 0 | 0 | 4 | 3 |
| 46 | MF | (India) | Christy Davis | 11 | 8 | 2 | 1 | 0 | 0 | 13 | 9 |
| 77 | MF | (India) | Lalliansanga Renthlei | 3 | 0 | - | - | - | - | 3 | 0 |
| 93 | DF | (India) | Akhil Praveen | 13 | 9 | 1 | 1 | 4 | 2 | 18 | 12 |
| 99 | MF | (India) | Calvin Baretto | 0 | 0 | 0 | 0 | 1 | 1 | 1 | 1 |

=== Goal scorers ===
| Rank | No. | Pos. | Nat. | Name | I League | Super Cup | Durand Cup | Total |
|---|---|---|---|---|---|---|---|---|
| 1 | 38 | FW | (Spain) | Álex Sánchez | 19 | 1 | 0 | 20 |
| 2 | 7 | FW | (Tajikistan) | Komron Tursunov | 6 | 0 | 0 | 6 |
| 3 | 8 | FW | (India) | Sreekuttan V. S. | 3 | 0 | 2 | 5 |
| 3 | 20 | MF | (Serbia) | Nikola Stojanović | 5 | 0 | 0 | 5 |
| 3 | 25 | FW | (Serbia) | Matija Babović | 5 | 0 | 0 | 5 |
| 3 | 29 | MF | (India) | Noufal PN | 5 | 0 | 0 | 5 |
| 7 | ~~10~~ | FW | (Spain) | Nili Perdomo | 3 | 0 | 0 | 3 |
| 7 | 11 | FW | (India) | Sourav K. | 2 | 0 | 1 | 3 |
| 7 | 42 | MF | (India) | Abhijith Kurungodan | 2 | 0 | 1 | 3 |
| 10 | 17 | DF | (Cameroon) | Aminou Bouba | 0 | 0 | 2 | 2 |
| 11 | 5 | DF | (India) | Nidhin Krishna | 1 | 0 | 0 | 1 |
| 11 | 10 | MF | (Spain) | Pitu Viera | 1 | 0 | 0 | 1 |
| 11 | 12 | DF | (India) | Laishram Johnson Singh | 1 | 0 | 0 | 1 |
| 11 | ~~14~~ | FW | (India) | Justine Emmanuel | 1 | 0 | 0 | 1 |
| 11 | 77 | MF | (India) | Lalliansanga Renthlei | 1 | 0 | 0 | 1 |
| Own Goals | | | | | 0 | 0 | 1 | 1 |
| Total | | | | | 55 | 1 | 7 | 63 |

=== Assists ===
Not all goals have an assist.

| Rank | No. | Pos. | Nat. | Name | I League | Super Cup | Durand Cup | Total |
|---|---|---|---|---|---|---|---|---|
| 1 | 29 | MF | (India) | Noufal PN | 9 | 0 | 1 | 10 |
| 2 | 38 | FW | (Spain) | Álex Sánchez | 6 | 0 | 3 | 9 |
| 3 | ~~10~~ | MF | (Spain) | Nili Perdomo | 3 | 0 | 1 | 4 |
| 3 | ~~23~~ | MF | (Spain) | Edu Bedia | 4 | 0 | 0 | 4 |
| 3 | 42 | MF | (India) | Abhijith Kurungodan | 3 | 0 | 1 | 4 |
| 6 | 8 | FW | (India) | Sreekuttan VS | 3 | 0 | 0 | 3 |
| 7 | 7 | FW | (Tajikistan) | Komron Tursunov | 2 | 0 | 0 | 2 |
| 8 | 2 | DF | (India) | Salam Ranjan Singh | 1 | 0 | 0 | 1 |
| 8 | 6 | MF | (India) | Rishad PP | 1 | 0 | 0 | 1 |
| 8 | 11 | FW | (India) | Sourav K | 1 | 0 | 0 | 1 |
| 8 | 20 | MF | (Serbia) | Nikola Stojanović | 1 | 0 | 0 | 1 |
| 8 | 25 | FW | (Serbia) | Matija Babović | 1 | 0 | 0 | 1 |
| 8 | 33 | DF | (India) | Muhammad Saheef | 1 | 0 | 0 | 1 |
| 8 | 46 | MF | (India) | Christy molly Davis | 1 | 0 | 0 | 1 |

=== Clean sheets ===
| No. | Nation | Name | I-League | Super Cup | Durand Cup | Total |
|---|---|---|---|---|---|---|
| 35 | (India) | Devansh Dabas | 3 | 0 | 0 | 3 |
| 21 | (India) | Avilash Paul | 1 | 0 | 0 | 1 |
| ~~21~~ | (India) | Zothanmawia | 0 | 0 | 1 | 1 |

=== Disciplinary record ===
As of match played 12 April 2024

| No. | Pos. | Name | I League | | Super Cup | | Durand Cup | | Total | |
| No. | Pos. | Name | Yellow card | Red card | Yellow card | Red card | Yellow card | Red card | Yellow card | Red card |
|---|---|---|---|---|---|---|---|---|---|---|
| 2 | DF | (India) Salam Ranjan Singh | 2 | 0 | 0 | 0 | 0 | 0 | 2 | 0 |
| 4 | DF | (India) Vikas Saini | 2 | 0 | 0 | 0 | 0 | 0 | 2 | 0 |
| 5 | DF | (India) Nidhin Krishna | 9 | 0 | 0 | 0 | 0 | 0 | 9 | 0 |
| 6 | MF | (India) Rishad PP | 1 | 0 | 0 | 0 | 0 | 0 | 1 | 0 |
| ~~7~~ | MF | (India) Rahul Raju | 0 | 0 | 0 | 0 | 1 | 0 | 1 | 0 |
| 8 | MF | (India) Sreekuttan VS | 2 | 0 | 1 | 0 | 0 | 0 | 3 | 0 |
| 9 | FW | (India) Senthamil Shanbagam | 1 | 0 | 0 | 0 | 0 | 0 | 1 | 0 |
| ~~10~~ | MF | (Spain) Nili Perdomo | 3 | 0 | 0 | 0 | 0 | 0 | 3 | 0 |
| 14 | FW | (Nigeria) Justine Emmanuel | 3 | 0 | 0 | 0 | 0 | 0 | 3 | 0 |
| 15 | DF | (India) Abdul Hakku | 1 | 0 | 1 | 0 | 0 | 0 | 2 | 0 |
| 17 | DF | (Cameroon) Aminou Bouba | 1 | 0 | 0 | 0 | 1 | 0 | 2 | 0 |
| 20 | MF | (Serbia) Nikola Stojanović | 2 | 0 | 0 | 0 | 0 | 0 | 2 | 0 |
| ~~21~~ | GK | (India) Zothanmawia | 0 | 0 | 0 | 0 | 1 | 0 | 1 | 0 |
| 21 | GK | (India) Avilash Paul | 0 | 0 | 1 | 0 | 0 | 0 | 1 | 0 |
| ~~23~~ | MF | (Spain) Edu Bedia | 2 | 0 | 0 | 0 | 0 | 0 | 2 | 0 |
| 33 | DF | (India) Muhammad Saheef | 2 | 0 | 0 | 0 | 0 | 0 | 2 | 0 |
| 35 | GK | (India) Devansh Dabas | 0 | 1 | 0 | 0 | 0 | 0 | 0 | 1 |
| 38 | FW | (Spain) Álex Sánchez | 3 | 0 | 0 | 0 | 0 | 0 | 3 | 0 |
| 42 | MF | (India) Abhijith Kurungodan | 2 | 0 | 0 | 0 | 1 | 0 | 3 | 0 |
| 44 | MF | (India) Basit Ahmed Bhat | 0 | 0 | 2 | 1 | 1 | 0 | 3 | 1 |
| 45 | DF | (India) Anas Edathodika | 1 | 0 | 0 | 0 | 0 | 0 | 1 | 0 |
| 46 | MF | (India) Christy molly Davis | 2 | 0 | 0 | 0 | 0 | 0 | 2 | 0 |
| 66 | DF | (India) Mashoor Shereef | 0 | 1 | 0 | 0 | 0 | 0 | 0 | 1 |
| 93 | DF | (India) Akhil Praveen | 2 | 0 | 0 | 0 | 0 | 0 | 2 | 0 |
| | | (Spain) Domingo Oramas | 1 | 1 | 0 | 0 | 0 | 0 | 1 | 1 |
