= 2020–21 Sudeva Delhi FC season =

2020–21 football season for Sudeva Delhi Football Club

Sudeva Delhi
2020–21 season
- President: Anuj Gupta
- Head coach: Chencho Dorji
- Top goalscorer: League: Shaiborlang Kharpan (2 goals); All: Shaiborlang Kharpan (2 goals)
- Highest home attendance: N/A
- Lowest home attendance: N/A
- Average home league attendance: N/A

The 2020–21 season was the 6th season of Sudeva Delhi Football Club in their existence and 1st season in the I-League.

== Team ==
=== First-team squad ===
As of 23 December 2020

Note: Flags indicate national team as defined under FIFA eligibility rules; some limited exceptions apply. Players may hold more than one non-FIFA nationality.

No.	Pos.	Nation	Player
1	GK	IND	Lovepreet Singh (on loan from Kerala Blasters FC)
3	DF	IND	Augustin Fernandes
4	DF	IND	Lalliansanga Renthlei
5	DF	IND	Gursimrat Singh Gill
6	DF	IND	Ngaraipam Kasomwung
7	MF	IND	Pintu Mahata
8	MF	IND	Kean Lewis
9	FW	IND	Manvir Singh
10	FW	IND	Ajay Singh
11	MF	IND	Vanlalzahawma
12	FW	IND	Shaiborlang Kharpan (on loan from Kerala Blasters)
13	DF	IND	Akashdeep Singh Kahlon
14	DF	IND	Kamal Choudhary
15	DF	IND	Mohit Singh
16	MF	IND	William Pauliankhum
17	MF	IND	Mohit Mittal
18	MF	IND	Sinam Maicheal Singh
19	DF	IND	Sairuat Kima
20	DF	IND	Prashant Narayan Choudhary
21	MF	IND	Ngangbam Naocha
22	FW	IND	Phairembam Rostam Singh
27	MF	IND	Swapnil Raj Dhaka
28	MF	IND	Naorem Tondonba Singh

No.	Pos.	Nation	Player
32	MF	IND	Lunkim Seigoulun Khongsai
33	FW	IND	Naorem Mahesh Singh (on loan from Kerala Blasters FC)
35	GK	IND	Sachin Jha
36	GK	IND	Ashish Sibi
39	DF	IND	Lalramhmunmawia
40	GK	IND	Rakshit Dagar
77	MF	IND	Ansh Gupta
99	MF	IND	Ishan Rozario
—	MF	IND	Vanlaltlankima Blakmawla
—	MF	IND	Abhijith Elippatta
—	MF	IND	Aryav Sharma
—	MF	IND	Johny K.v.I Muanpuia
—	MF	IND	Suji Kumar M
—	MF	IND	Amandeep
—	MF	IND	R. Lallawmawma
—	MF	IND	Aneesudheen Abdul Azeez
—	DF	IND	Amandeep P Singh
—	MF	IND	Tarun Taneja
—	FW	IND	Ayush Chhikara (on loan from Mumbai City FC)
—	MF	IND	Vikram Singh Gill
—	MF	IND	Waris Rashid
—	MF	IND	Gopi Kannan
—	MF	IND	H Lalhmingchhuanga
—	MF	IND	Eddie Fung
—	DF	IND	Wallace J Martins
—	MF	IND	Sanjib Das
—	GK	IND	Anirban Yadav

== Technical staff ==
Position	Name
Head Coach	(Bhutan) Chencho Dorji
Assistant Coach	(India) Pushpender Kundu
Technical Director	(Nigeria) Afolabi Rabiu
Physiotherapist	(India) Mohammed Arshak. AT
Coach U18	(Nigeria) Hakim Ssegendo
Coach U15	(India) PS Lalngaihzuala
Coach U13	(Nigeria) Franklin Onalega

== Competitions ==
Win Draw Loss

Competition	First match	Last match	Starting round	Record							
Competition	First match	Last match	Starting round	Pld	W	D	L	GF	GA	GD	Win %
I-League	9 January 2021	2021	Matchday 1	3	1	1	1	4	2	+2	33.33
Super Cup	2021	2021	TBA	0	0	0	0	0	0	+0	—
Total				3	1	1	1	4	2	+2	33.33

Last updated: 19 January 2021.
Source: Competitions

=== I-League ===
==== League table ====
Pos	Team	Pld	W	D	L	GF	GA	GD	Pts	Qualification or relegation
6	Mohammedan	10	4	4	2	9	8	+1	16	Promote to Championship Stage (Group A)
7	Aizawl	10	4	3	3	13	8	+5	15	Demote to Relegation Stage (Group B)
8	Sudeva Delhi	10	2	3	5	11	11	0	9	Demote to Relegation Stage (Group B)
9	Chennai City	10	3	0	7	7	19	−12	9	Demote to Relegation Stage (Group B)
10	NEROCA	10	2	2	6	13	15	−2	8	Demote to Relegation Stage (Group B)

Source: I-League
Rules for classification: 1) points; 2) head-to-head points; 3) head-to-head goal difference; 4) goal difference; 5) number of goals scored; 6) drawing of lots

==== League Results by round ====
Round	1	2	3	4	5	6	7	8	9	10	11	12	13	14	15	16	17	18	19	20
Result	L	W	D																	
League Position	11	4	4																	

Updated to match(es) played on 19 January 2021. Source: Matchday
W = Win; D = Draw; L = Loss

=== League Matchdays ===
9 January 2021 1	Sudeva Delhi	0–1	Mohammedan SC	Kolkata
14:00 IST	William Pauliankhum (yellow card) 19'	Report	Faisal Ali 58'; Nikhil Kadam (yellow card) 60'	Stadium: Salt Lake Stadium; Attendance: 0 Man of the Match: Faisal Ali (Mohammedan)

14 January 2021 2	Sudeva Delhi	3–0	Indian Arrows	Kolkata
16:05 IST	Kean Lewis 40'; Naorem Mahesh 49'; Kharpan 66'	Report		Stadium: Kalyani Stadium; Attendance: 0 Man of the Match: Kean Lewis (Sudeva)

19 January 2021 3	Real Kashmir FC	3–0	Sudeva Delhi	Kolkata
18:00 IST	Mason Robertson 75'	Report	Kharpan 62'	Stadium: Mohun Bagan Ground; Attendance: 0 Man of the Match: Kharpan (Sudeva)

== Statistics ==
=== Squad statistics ===
	I-League	Super Cup	Total
Games played	3	0	3
Games won	1	0	1
Games drawn	1	0	1
Games lost	1	0	1
Goals scored	4	0	4
Goals conceded	2	0	2
Goal difference	+2	0	+2
Clean sheets	1	0	1
Yellow cards	4	0	4
Red cards	0	0	0

== See also ==
- 2020–21 in Indian football
