= 2024–25 Churchill Brothers FC season =

Indian football club season

Churchill Brothers
2024–25 season
- CEO: Valanka Alemao
- Head coach: Francesc Bonet
- Stadium: Tilak Maidan
- I-League: 1st or second
Home colours	Away colours

The 2024–25 season wIill be the 37th season of Churchill Brothers in existence and sixteenth in the I-League. Head coach Francesc Bonet signed a contract extensions on 28 July 2024.

== Personnel ==
=== Current technical staff ===
Position	Name
Head coach	(Spain) Francesc Bonet
Assistant coach	(India) Thangjam Saran Singh
Fitness and conditioning coach	(India) Luv Kappor
Goalkeeping coach	(India) Nikidesh Kalari Vattath
Head physiotherapist	(India) Anandu S Kumar

== Current squad ==
=== First-team squad ===
As of 26 September 2024

Note: Flags indicate national team as defined under FIFA eligibility rules; some limited exceptions apply. Players may hold more than one non-FIFA nationality.

No.	Pos.	Nation	Player
5	DF	IND	Ponif Vaz
7	FW	IND	Stendly Fernandes
11	FW	IND	Faisal Ali
15	DF	KOR	Kim Jeong-Heen
17	DF	IND	Lalremruata
18	FW	IND	Trijoy Dias
19	DF	IND	Lamgoulen Hangshing (vice-captain)
26	FW	IND	Lunminlen Haokip
32	MF	IND	Pushkar Sanjay Prabhu
33	MF	IND	Richard Costa (captain)
34	DF	CIV	Aubin Kouakou
40	MF	GHA	Kofi Essien
44	MF	IND	Jobern Cardozo
49	DF	IND	Lesly Rebello
57	FW	IND	Anil Rama Gaonkar

No.	Pos.	Nation	Player
88	FW	NGA	Chika Ajulu
99	FW	NGA	Ogana Louis
—	MF	IND	Gaurav K
—	GK	IND	Subhajit Bhattacharjee
—	MF	ESP	Juan Mera
—	MF	IND	Kingslee Fernandes
—	FW	RSA	Wayde Lekay
—	FW	ENG	Kurtis Guthrie
—	DF	IND	Thomas Cherian (on loan from Kerala Blasters B)
—	FW	IND	Ashley Alban Koli (on loan from Mohammedan)
—	MF	SEN	Pape Gassama
—	DF	IND	Nishchal Chandan

== Transfers ==
=== In ===
Date	Position	Nationality	Player	From	Fee	Ref.
31 August 2024	MF	(Spain)	Juan Mera	(India) Punjab	Free Transfer	
1 September 2024	MF	(India)	Kingslee Fernandes	(India) Punjab	Free Transfer	
7 September 2024	FW	(South Africa)	Wayde Lekay	(Sweden) Trollhättan	Free Transfer	
13 September 2024	FW	(England)	Kurtis Guthrie	(Scotland) Livingston	Free Transfer	
21 September 2024	MF	(Senegal)	Pape Gassama	(India) Delhi	Free Transfer	
21 September 2024	DF	(India)	Nishchal Chandan	(India) Jamshedpur	Free Transfer	

=== Loans in ===
Date	Pos	Nationality	Player	Loaned from	Until	Ref
1 September 2024	DF	(India)	Thomas Cherian	(India) Kerala Blasters B	31 May 2025	
1 September 2024	FW	(India)	Ashley Alban Koli	(India) Mohammedan	31 May 2025	

=== Out ===
Date	Position	Nationality	Player	To	Fee	Ref.
1 July 2024	FW	(India)	Silvana R Lalruatkima	(India) Chhinga Veng FC	Loan Return	
1 July 2024	MF	(India)	Rahul Raju	(India) Gokulam Kerala	Loan Return	
16 July 2024	DF	(India)	Nishchal Chandan	(India) Jamshedpur	Free Transfer	
2 May 2024	MF	(Uruguay)	Martín Cháves	(India) Gokulam Kerala	Free Transfer	
13 August 2024	DF	(India)	Sebastian Thangmuansang	(India) Gokulam Kerala	Free Transfer	
21 August 2024	GK	(India)	Subhasish Roy Chowdhury	(India) Forca Kochi FC	Free Transfer	
27 August 2024	GK	(India)	Bilal Khan	(India) Kannur Warriors FC	Free Transfer	
28 August 2024	DF	(India)	Ajith Kumar	(India) Malappuram FC	Free Transfer	
29 August 2024	MF	(India)	Lalawmpuia Sailo	(India) Aizawl	Free Transfer	
07 October 2024	FW	(Senegal)	Abdou Karim Samb	(India) Real Kashmir	Free Transfer	

== Competitions ==
=== Overview ===
Competition	First match	Last match	Final position	Record							
Competition	First match	Last match	Final position	Pld	W	D	L	GF	GA	GD	Win %
I League	TBD	TBD	TBD	0	0	0	0	0	0	+0	—
Total				0	0	0	0	0	0	+0	—

Source: Competitions

=== I-League ===
==== League table ====
Pos	Team	Pld	W	D	L	GF	GA	GD	Pts	Promotion or relegation
1	Inter Kashi (C, P)	22	12	6	4	42	31	+11	42 (Note: Inter Kashi was awarded and then stripped of points in multiple rulings. The Court of Arbitration for Sport ultimately ruled in their favor, restoring four deducted points.)	Promotion to ISL and qualification for Super Cup (April) and (October)
2	Churchill Brothers	22	11	7	4	45	25	+20	40 (Note: Churchill Brothers were deducted one point and awarded two, which were later revoked by the Court of Arbitration for Sport and Churchill Brothers challenges this decision in Federal Supreme Court of Switzerland, which was dismissed, preventing further changes in points table.)	
3	Real Kashmir	22	10	7	5	31	25	+6	37 (Note: The forfeit win originally awarded to Real Kashmir was revoked by CAS in favor of Inter Kashi.)	
4	Gokulam Kerala	22	11	4	7	45	29	+16	37 (Note: Head-to-head: Real Kashmir 4, Gokulam Kerala 1)	Qualification for Super Cup (April) and (October)
5	Rajasthan United	22	9	6	7	34	33	+1	33	Qualification for Super Cup (October)

Source: I-League
Rules for classification: 1) Points; 2) Head-to-head points; 3) Head-to-head goal difference; 4) Total goal difference; 5) Total goals scored; 6) Drawing of lots
(Note: Head-to-head applies only after all relevant matches are played)
(C) Champions; (P) Promoted
