= Nishchal Chandan =

Indian footballer (born 1999)

Personal information
- Full name: Nishchal Chandan
- Date of birth: 20 June 1999 (age 27)
- Place of birth: Chandigarh, India
- Height: 1.90 m (6 ft 3 in)
- Position: Centre-back

Team information
- Current team: Inter Kashi
- Number: 2

Youth career
- 2015–2019: Minerva Punjab

Senior career*
Years	Team	Apps	(Gls)
2019–2020	Punjab B	3	(0)
2020	Techtro Swades United		
2020–2021	Minerva Academy		
2021	Delhi		
2021	Hyderya Sports		
2021–2023	Sudeva Delhi	21	(1)
2023–2024	Churchill Brothers	19	(0)
2024	Jamshedpur	0	(0)
2024–2025	Churchill Brothers	19	(1)
2025–2026	Inter Kashi	9	(0)
2026	Punjab	0	(0)
2026–	Inter Kashi	2	(0)
- * Club domestic league appearances and goals as of 17 October 2026

Nishchal Chandan (born 20 June 1999) is an Indian professional footballer who plays as a defender for Indian Super League club Inter Kashi.

== Early life ==
Chandan is born in Chandigarh.

== Career ==
=== Minerva Academy FC ===
Chandan's journey started with Minerva Academy in 2015, where he learnt his basic skills and honed them. Later, became a champion in the U-18 I-League North Zone Championship with Minerva FC.

=== Punjab FC ===
He progressed to make his debut in the I-League second division with Punjab FC in 2020-21.

=== Sudeva Delhi FC ===
He followed by a stint with Sudeva FC from 2021-23, where he not only made his I-League debut as captain but also scored a goal.

=== Churchill Brothers FC Goa ===
He later followed by a move to Churchill Brothers in 2023-24 playing all 19 games.

=== Jamshedpur FC ===
On 16 July 2024, Nishchal penned a deal with Jamshedpur FC.

== Career statistics ==
=== Club ===
As of match played 13 February 2026

Appearances and goals by club, season and competition
Club	Season	League			Cup (Note: Includes Durand Cup)		AFC		Total	
Club	Season	Division	Apps	Goals	Apps	Goals	Apps	Goals	Apps	Goals
Punjab FC B	2020	I League 2nd Division	3	0	—		—		3	0
Sudeva Delhi	2021–22	I-League	14	1	—		—		14	1
Sudeva Delhi	2022–23	I-League	7	0	4	0	—		11	0
Sudeva Delhi	Total		21	1	4	0	—		25	1
Churchill Brothers	2023–24	I-League	19	0	—		—		19	0
Jamshedpur	2024–25	Indian Super League	0	0	—		—		0	0
Churchill Brothers	2024–25	I-League	19	1	—		—		19	1
Inter Kashi	2025–26	Indian Super League	0	0	0	0	—		0	0
Career total			62	2	4	0	—		66	2

== Honours ==
Minerva academy Fc

- U-18 I-League North Zone Championship
