= Nili (footballer) =

Spanish footballer (born 1994)

Nili Perdomo
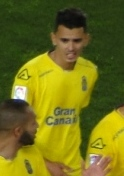
- Nili with Las Palmas in 2015

Personal information
- Full name: Francisco José Perdomo Borges
- Date of birth: 18 February 1994 (age 32)
- Place of birth: Las Palmas, Spain
- Height: 1.76 m (5 ft 9 in)
- Position: Midfielder

Team information
- Current team: Gokulam Kerala
- Number: 10

Youth career
- 2008–2013: Las Palmas

Senior career*
Years	Team	Apps	(Gls)
2013–2015	Las Palmas B	52	(4)
2015–2016	Las Palmas	9	(0)
2016–2017	Barcelona B	18	(1)
2016	Barcelona	0	(0)
2017–2018	Albacete	9	(1)
2018–2020	Platanias	45	(11)
2020	Bengaluru	6	(0)
2020–2022	Levadiakos	50	(13)
2022–2023	Kallithea	11	(0)
2023	Gokulam Kerala	11	(3)
2023–2024	Chania	3	(5)
2024	Panachaiki	6	(0)
2025	Kalamata	6	(0)
2025	Chania	2	(0)
2026–	Gokulam Kerala	2	(0)
- * Club domestic league appearances and goals as of 7 March 2026

Francisco José Perdomo Borges (born 18 February 1994), commonly known as Nili, is a Spanish professional footballer who plays as a midfielder for Indian Football League club Gokulam Kerala.

== Career ==
Born in Las Palmas, Canary Islands, Nili graduated with UD Las Palmas's youth setup, and made his senior debuts with the C-team in 2012. In the following year, he was promoted to the reserves of the Segunda División B.

On 19 December 2014, Nili renewed his contract until 2016. He made his first-team debut on 7 June, starting in a 3–2 home win against Deportivo Alavés in the Segunda División.

Nili made his La Liga debut on 14 February 2016, coming on as a late substitute for David García in a 0–2 away loss against Sevilla FC. On 1 July of that year, he signed for FC Barcelona B after his contract expired.

Nili made his first team debut for Barça on 30 November 2016, replacing Samuel Umtiti in a 1–1 away draw against Hércules CF, in the season's Copa del Rey. The following 1 September, however, he cut ties with the club and immediately signed a two-year contract with Albacete Balompié.

On 24 January 2018, Nili moved abroad for the first time in his career after signing for Platanias in the Super League Greece.

On 28 January 2020, Nili joined Indian club Bengaluru FC as a replacement for Manuel Onwu.

On 9 June 2020, he signed a two-year contract with Levadiakos. After having a great 2021–22 season and winning the South Group of Super League 2 and beating Veria 2–0 on aggregate to win promotion to the Super League, he was named the best player of the 2021–22 Super League 2.

In the summer of 2022, Nili joined Kallithea, after running out his previous contract.

On 16 June 2023, Nili returned to India joining I-League club Gokulam Kerala and signing a one-year contract.

== Career statistics ==
=== Club ===
As of 19 December 2023

Club	Season	League			National Cup		Continental		Other		Total	
Club	Season	Division	Apps	Goals	Apps	Goals	Apps	Goals	Apps	Goals	Apps	Goals
Las Palmas B	2013–14	Segunda División B	24	2	—		—		—		24	2
Las Palmas B	2014–15	Segunda División B	27	2	—		—		—		27	2
Las Palmas B	Total		51	4	0	0	0	0	0	0	51	4
Las Palmas	2014–15	Segunda División	1	0	0	0	—		—		1	0
Las Palmas	2015–16	La Liga	8	0	5	0	—		—		13	0
Las Palmas	Total		9	0	5	0	0	0	0	0	14	0
Barcelona B	2016–17	Segunda División B	18	1	—		—		—		18	1
Barcelona	2016–17	La Liga	0	0	1	0	—		—		1	0
Albacete	2017–18	Segunda División	9	1	1	0	—		—		10	1
Platanias	2017–18	Super League Greece	8	0	0	0	—		—		8	0
Platanias	2018–19	Beta Ethniki	27	8	0	0	—		2 (Note: Appearances in Beta Ethniki promotion play-offs)	0	29	8
Platanias	2019–20	Super League Greece 2	8	3	2	0	—		—		10	3
Platanias	Total		43	11	2	0	0	0	0	0	45	11
Bengaluru	2019–20	Indian Super League	6	0	0	0	4	2	—		10	2
Levadiakos	2020–21	Super League Greece 2	21	2	0	0	—		—		21	2
Levadiakos	2021–22	Super League Greece 2	28	11	3	0	—		—		31	11
Levadiakos	Total		49	13	3	0	0	0	0	0	52	13
Kallithea	2022–23	Super League Greece 2	12	1	3	1	—		—		15	2
Gokulam Kerala	2023–24	I-League	11	3	4 (Note: Appearance(s) in Durand Cup)	0	—		—		15	3
Career total			208	34	19	1	4	2	2	0	233	37

== Honours ==
Levadiakos

- Super League 2: 2021–22
