= Basit Ahmed Bhat =

Indian footballer (born 1998)

Basit Ahmed
Personal information
- Full name: Basit Ahmed Bhat
- Date of birth: 17 February 1998 (age 28)
- Place of birth: Gandhinagar, Jammu and Kashmir, India
- Height: 1.84 m (6 ft 1/2 in)
- Position: Left winger

Youth career
- J&K Bank Football club

Senior career*
Years	Team	Apps	(Gls)
2018–19	Lonestar Kashmir	13	(2)
2019–2020	Kerala Blasters B	4	(0)
2020–2021	Real Kashmir	3	(1)
2021	Hyderya Sports		
2021–2022	Hindustan		
2022–2023	Sudeva Delhi	15	(1)
2023	Downtown Heroes	7	(0)
2023–2024	Gokulam Kerala	9	(0)
2024–2026	Real Kashmir		
2026–	Samaleswari		
- * Club domestic league appearances and goals as of 15:30, 14 March 2024 (UTC)

Basit Ahmed Bhat (born on 17 February 1998) is an Indian professional footballer who plays as a left winger for the Indian Football League club Samaleswari.

== Career ==
Basit began his initial vocation by joining a neighbourhood group "Towheed FC" at 16 years old. Then, he played in the top notch division of a neighbourhood club named "Maharaja J&K affiliation club" where he scored eight goals in nine matches. Later on, Ahmed joined Star FC second division for 2016–17 season. After that he joined Jammu and Kashmir Bank Academy U-18 and played I-League scoring two goals against Minerva. He has likewise played for the J&K Bank Football Club senior group in 2019.

In 2017, he was additionally chosen for Spanish Tercera División club SD Lenense. Same year he signed for the Lonestar Kashmir FC and scored two goals in 14 appearances. In 2019 he signed for Kerala Blasters in 2019–2020 and played for their reserve side. He won the 2019-20 season of Kerala Premier League with the reserve side. Basit left the club in 2020 to join Real Kashmir. He made his first ever professional debut on 10 March 2021 against TRAU FC.

== Career statistics ==
=== Club ===
As of 14 March 2024

Club	Season	League			National Cup		League Cup		AFC		Total	
Club	Season	Division	Apps	Goals	Apps	Goals	Apps	Goals	Apps	Goals	Apps	Goals
Lonestar Kashmir	2018–19	I-League 2nd Division	13	2	–		–		–		13	2
Kerala Blasters B	2019–20	I-League 2nd Division	4	0	–		–		–		4	0
Real Kashmir	2020–21	I-League	3	1	0	0	–		–		3	1
Sudeva Delhi	2021–22	I-League	11	0	0	0	–		–		11	0
Sudeva Delhi	2022–23	I-League	4	1	2 (Note: Appearance(s) in Durand Cup)	0	0	0	–		6	1
Sudeva Delhi	Total		15	1	0	0	2	0	0	0	17	1
Downtown Heroes	2022–23	I-League 2	7	0	–		–		–		7	0
Gokulam Kerala	2023–24	I-League	9	0	4	0	2 (Note: Appearance(s) in Super Cup)	0	–		15	0
Career total			51	4	6	0	2	0	0	0	59	4

== Honours ==
Kerala Blasters Reserves

- Kerala Premier League: 2019–20
