= Noufal P. N. =

Indian footballer (born 2000)

- Noufal with Mumbai City FC in 2026

Personal information
- Full name: Noufal Puthenveettil Noushad
- Date of birth: 30 October 2000 (age 26)
- Place of birth: Thiruvambady, Kerala, India
- Height: 1.71 m (5 ft 7 in)
- Position: Winger

Team information
- Current team: Mumbai City
- Number: 92

Youth career
- Cosmos FC

Senior career*
Years	Team	Apps	(Gls)
2021−2022	BASCO FC	11	(0)
2022−2024	Gokulam Kerala	43	(5)
2024−	Mumbai City	21	(3)

International career^{‡}
2026–	India	1	(0)
- * Club domestic league appearances and goals as of 19:00, 20 March 2026 (UTC) ‡ National team caps and goals as of 20:00, 27 May 2026

Noufal Puthenveettil Noushad (born 30 October 2000), known as Noufal P. N., is an Indian professional footballer who plays as a winger for Indian Super League club Mumbai City and the India national team.

== Early life ==
Noufal was born in Thiruvambady, a small hill town near Kozhikode. He started playing football at the age of eight and first played for the local club Cosmos Football Club. He credits NNMHSS Chelembra with backing him unconditionally, during his school days, he developed his early football career playing for NNMHSS Chelembra in school-level tournaments. Later, he played for BASCO FC in the Kerala Premier League 2021–2022. His impressive performances saw him picked up for the Kerala state team for the Santosh Trophy, where he was later picked by Gokulam Kerala.

Noufal later won 2021–22 Santosh Trophy as a player of the Kerala football team.

== Club career ==
=== Gokulam Kerala ===
Noufal signed by his hometown club Gokulam Kerala on 15 September 2022. He played his first match against Mohammedan SC against Aizawl on 25 February 2023 where he assisted two goals and was named Man of the Match.

On 28 October 2023, Noufal scored his first league goal against Inter Kashi.

On 2 December 2023, he scored the second goal in a 2–2 draw against Namdhari.

=== Mumbai City ===
On 15 June 2024, Indian Super League club Mumbai City announced the signing of Noufal on a three-year contract. He made his debut for the club as a substitute in their first game of the season on 13 September 2024, away against Mohun Bagan. Coming in with Mumbai 2–0 down, he played a crucial role in both of Mumbai's goals, giving the cross that led to a goal-mouth scramble for the first goal, and directly assisting the second goal, as they fought back to draw the match 2-2.

== Career statistics ==
=== Club ===
As of 10 April 2026

Appearances and goals by club, season and competition
Club	Season	League			National cup (Note: Includes AIFF Super Cup)		AFC		Others		Total	
Club	Season	Division	Apps	Goals	Apps	Goals	Apps	Goals	Apps	Goal	Apps	Goal
Gokulam Kerala	2022–23	I-League	20	0	3	0	0	0	1 (Note: Appearance in play–offs for AFC Cup)	0	24	0
Gokulam Kerala	2023–24	I-League	23	5	3	0	—		4 (Note: Appearances in Durand Cup)	0	30	5
Gokulam Kerala	Total		43	5	6	0	0	0	5	0	54	5
Mumbai City	2024–25	Indian Super League	14	0	3	0	—		—		17	0
Mumbai City	2025–26	Indian Super League	7	3	1	0	—		—		8	3
Mumbai City	Total		21	3	4	0	0	0	0	0	25	3
Career total			64	8	10	0	4	0	5	0	79	8

=== International ===
As of 27 May 2026

National team	Year	Apps	Goals
India	2026	1	0
Total		1	0

== Honours ==
Kerala

- 2021–22 Santosh Trophy:

India

- SAFF Championship: 2026
