= Pravitto Raju =

Indian footballer

Personal information
- Date of birth: 25 April 1997 (age 29)
- Place of birth: Kanyakumari, Tamil Nadu
- Position: Right midfielder

Team information
- Current team: Rajasthan United

Senior career*
Years	Team	Apps	(Gls)
2018–2021	Chennai City	27	(2)
2021–2023	Mumbai Kenkre	33	(1)
2023–	Rajasthan United	0	(0)
- * Club domestic league appearances and goals as of 20:11, 11 March 2023 (UTC)

Pravitto Raju (born 25 April 1997) is an Indian professional footballer who plays as a right midfielder for I-League club Rajasthan United.

== Career ==
Pravitto kicked off his football career, playing for RBI in the first division during his college days. He played an instrumental role in earning RBI their promotion to the senior division football league. At the end of the season, it was Indian Bank Recreational Club assistant coach Noel, who spotted his talent and signed him on at the club. Pravitto then went on to succeed at his new club, scoring nine goals that helped Indian Bank to put an end to a trophy draught.

He made his professional debut for the Chennai City F.C. against Churchill Brothers on 1 November 2018, He was brought in the 72nd minute as Chennai City drew 1–1.

== Career statistics ==
=== Club ===
As of 11 March 2023

Club	Season	League			Cup		Continental		Total	
Club	Season	Division	Apps	Goals	Apps	Goals	Apps	Goals	Apps	Goals
Chennai City	2018–19	I-League	11	1	1 (Note: Appearance(s) in Super Cup)	0	–		12	1
Chennai City	2019–20	I-League	10	1	3 (Note: Appearance(s) in Durand Cup)	0	—		14	1
Chennai City	2020–21	I-League	6	0	0	0	—		6	0
Chennai City	Chennai City total		27	2	4	0	0	0	31	2
Mumbai Kenkre	2021	I-League 2nd Division	6	1	0	0	—		6	1
Mumbai Kenkre	2021–22	I-League	11	0	0	0	—		11	0
Mumbai Kenkre	2022–23	I-League	16	0	0	0	—		16	0
Mumbai Kenkre	Kenkre total		33	1	0	0	0	0	33	1
Career total			60	3	4	0	0	0	64	3
