= Wayde Lekay =

South African soccer player

Personal information
- Full name: Wayde Lekay
- Date of birth: 9 May 1997 (age 29)
- Place of birth: Cape Town, Western Cape
- Height: 1.87 m (6 ft 2 in)
- Position: Forward

Team information
- Current team: Churchill Brothers

Youth career
- 2003–2008: Avendale Athletico
- 2009–2014: Vasco da Gama
- 2014: SuperSport United

Senior career*
Years	Team	Apps	(Gls)
2014–2015	Tygerberg	0	(0)
2015–2017	Atlantic Nacional	0	(0)
2017–2019	SuperSport United	0	(0)
2019–2020	Steenberg United	2	(2)
2020–2022	TS Galaxy	45	(7)
2022–2023	Cape Town City	8	(1)
2023–2024	Trollhättan	27	(5)
2024–2025	Churchill Brothers	21	(12)
2025–2026	Siwelele	7	(0)
2026–	Churchill Brothers	4	(0)
- * Club domestic league appearances and goals as of 5 November 2026

Wayde Lekay (born 9 May 1997) is a South African professional soccer player who plays as a forward for Indian Super League club Churchill Brothers.

== Career ==
He started his senior career in the Second Division with Tygerberg and Atlantic Nacional. In 2017 he was on trial at Bidvest Wits. He ended up joining SuperSport United and played for their reserves. He moved on to National First Division outfit Steenberg United before joining his first Premier Division club in 2020, TS Galaxy. Stating that his goal for the 2020-21 South African Premier Division was to score 20 goals, he made his first-tier debut in October 2020 and also scored his first goal in that match.

During the summer of 2022, he was on a much-publicized trial with Kaizer Chiefs and also Royal AM, before joining Cape Town City. He played several league games before the World Cup break in late 2022. In the spring of 2023, he was released after Cape Town City brought in Juan Zapata and Bertrand Mani. Lekay first trained with Cape Town Spurs. In the summer of 2023 he went to Sweden, first on trial with Helsingborgs IF, where the manager Stuart Baxter was intimately familiar with South African soccer. Lekay ended up joining FC Trollhättan in the Ettan. There were significant weather and cultural differences in this environment.
