= Sairuat Kima =

Indian footballer (born 1997)

Personal information
- Date of birth: 7 November 1997 (age 29)
- Place of birth: Mizoram, India
- Height: 1.88 m (6 ft 2 in)
- Position: Centre-back

Team information
- Current team: Kannur Warriors FC
- Number: 19

Youth career
- Chanmari
- 2015–2016: DSK Shivajians

Senior career*
Years	Team	Apps	(Gls)
2016–2017	DSK Shivajians	12	(0)
2017–2018	Jamshedpur	0	(0)
2018–2020	Bengaluru	2	(0)
2018–2020	→ Bengaluru B (loan)	3	(0)
2020–2022	Sudeva Delhi	30	(1)
2022–2023	Mohammedan	10	(0)
2023–2024	Rajasthan United	12	(0)
2024–2025	Sporting CG		
2025–2026	Diamond Harbour		

International career
2017	India U23	1	(0)
- * Club domestic league appearances and goals

Sairuat Kima (born 7 November 1997) is an Indian professional footballer who plays as a defender.

== Career ==
Kima began his career in Mizoram with Chanmari before joining DSK Shivajians in 2015. He played for the club's youth academy and also played for the senior side during the 2016 Durand Cup. He was promoted to the senior side before the tournament began.

He made his professional debut for the club during their first I-League match of the season against Mumbai on 8 January 2017. He started and played the full match despite DSK Shivajians falling to a 1–0 defeat.

=== Jamshedpur ===
On 23 July 2017, Kima was selected in the 9th round of the 2017–18 ISL Players Draft by Jamshedpur for the 2017–18 Indian Super League. After not playing a single game during the ISL season, Kima made his debut for Jamshedpur on 12 April 2018 in their Super Cup quarter-final match against Goa. He started and played only one half as he had to be substituted for goalkeeper Rafique Ali Sardar after Subrata Pal was sent off. Jamshedpur would lose the match 1–5 with four of the Goan goals occurring after Kima was subbed off.

=== Bengaluru ===
On 11 June 2018, Bengaluru FC announced they had signed Kima on a two-year deal. He made his first team debut for the club against his former club, Jamshedpur F.C on February 27, 2019, where Bengaluru F.C lost to the host 5–1.

=== Mohammedan ===
In June 2022, Kima joined I-League club Mohammedan, on a two-year deal. On 16 August, he made his debut for the club against Goa in the Durand Cup, which ended in a 3–1 comeback win. Five days later, he was named Player of the Match against Jamshedpur, which ended in a dominating 3–0 win.

== Career statistics ==
=== Club ===
As of 28 July 2025

Club	Season	League			Cup		AFC		Others		Total	
Club	Season	Division	Apps	Goals	Apps	Goals	Apps	Goals	Apps	Goals	Apps	Goals
DSK Shivajians	2016–17	I-League	12	0	3 (Note: Appearance(s) in Federation Cup)	0	–		–		15	0
Jamshedpur	2017–18	Indian Super League	0	0	1 (Note: Appearance(s) in Super Cup)	0	–		–		1	0
Bengaluru	2018–19	Indian Super League	1	0	0	0	–		–		1	0
Bengaluru	2019–20	Indian Super League	1	0	3 (Note: Appearance(s) in Durand Cup)	0	1 (Note: Appearance(s) in AFC Cup)	0	–		5	0
Bengaluru	Total		2	0	3	0	1	0	0	0	6	0
Bengaluru B	2018–19	I-League 2nd Division	2	0	0	0	–		–		2	0
Bengaluru B	2019–20	I-League 2nd Division	1	0	0	0	–		–		1	0
Bengaluru B	Total		3	0	0	0	0	0	0	0	3	0
Sudeva Delhi	2020–21	I-League	14	1	0	0	–		–		14	1
Sudeva Delhi	2021–22	I-League	16	0	3	0	–		–		19	0
Sudeva Delhi	Total		30	1	3	0	0	0	0	0	33	1
Mohammedan	2022–23	I-League	10	0	5	0	–		–		15	0
Rajasthan United	2023–24	I-League	12	0	3	0	–		–		15	0
Sporting CG	2024–25	I-League 2	0	0	0	0	–		–		0	0
Diamond Harbour	2025–26	I-League	0	0	1	1	–		5 (Note: Appearance(s) in Calcutta Football League)	0	6	1
Career total			69	1	19	1	1	0	5	0	94	2

== Honours ==
Bengaluru

- Indian Super League: 2018–19
