= Banpynkhrawnam Nongkhlaw =

Indian footballer

Personal information
- Date of birth: 21 September 1997 (age 29)
- Place of birth: Meghalaya, India
- Height: 1.75 m (5 ft 9 in)
- Position: Centre-back

Team information
- Current team: Diamond Harbour
- Number: 4

Youth career
- 2012–2013: Royal Wahingdoh

Senior career*
Years	Team	Apps	(Gls)
2014–2018	Nangkiew Irat		
2016–2018	→ Churchill Brothers (loan)	9	(0)
2019–2021	Ryntih	3	(1)
2022	Kenkre	13	(0)
2022	Southern Samity		
2022–2023	Mumbai Kenkre	20	(1)
2023–2024	Rajasthan United	17	(0)
2024–	Diamond Harbour		
- * Club domestic league appearances and goals

Banpynkhrawnam Nongkhlaw (born 21 September 1997) is an Indian professional footballer who plays as a defender.

== Career ==
Nongkhlaw made his professional debut in India, playing for Churchill Brothers in the I-League against Minerva Punjab. He came on as a substitute in the 51st minute.

== Career statistics ==
=== Club ===
As of 11 March 2023

Club	Season	League			Cup		AFC		Total	
Club	Season	Division	Apps	Goals	Apps	Goals	Apps	Goals	Apps	Goals
Churchill Brothers (loan)	2016–17	I-League	3	0	0	0	—		3	0
Churchill Brothers (loan)	2017–18	I-League	6	0	0	0	—		6	0
Churchill Brothers (loan)	Churchill total		9	0	0	0	0	0	9	0
Ryntih	2021	I-League 2nd Division	3	1	0	0	—		3	1
Mumbai Kenkre	2021–22	I-League	13	0	0	0	—		13	0
Mumbai Kenkre	2022–23	I-League	20	1	0	0	—		20	1
Mumbai Kenkre	Kenkre total		33	1	0	0	0	0	33	1
Rajasthan United	2023–24	I-League	0	0	0	0	—		0	0
Career total			45	2	0	0	0	0	45	2
