= Vanlalzahawma =

Indian footballer

Personal information
- Full name: Vanlalzahawma
- Date of birth: 29 December 2000 (age 25)
- Place of birth: Mizoram, India
- Position: Midfielder

Team information
- Current team: Sudeva Delhi FC

Youth career
- Sudeva Delhi FC U16
- Sudeva Delhi FC U18

Senior career*
Years	Team	Apps	(Gls)
2020-	Sudeva Delhi FC	1	(0)
- * Club domestic league appearances and goals

Vanlalzahawma (born 29 December 2000) is an Indian professional footballer who plays as a midfielder for Sudeva Delhi FC in the I-League.

== Career ==
Vanlalzahawma made his first professional appearance for Sudeva Delhi FC on 9 January 2021 against Mohammedan SC as substitute on 81st minute.

== Career statistics ==
As of 10 January 2021

Club	Season	League			Federation Cup		Durand Cup		AFC		Total	
Club	Season	Division	Apps	Goals	Apps	Goals	Apps	Goals	Apps	Goals	Apps	Goals
Sudeva Delhi FC	2020–21	I-League	1	0	0	0	0	0	—	—	1	0
Career total			1	0	0	0	0	0	0	0	1	0
