= Pape Gassama =

Senegalese footballer (born 1996)

Personal information
- Full name: Pape Alassane Gassama
- Date of birth: 1 September 1996 (age 30)
- Place of birth: Dakar, Senegal
- Height: 1.80 m (5 ft 11 in)
- Position: Central midfielder

Team information
- Current team: Sreenidi Deccan
- Number: 99

Senior career*
Years	Team	Apps	(Gls)
2015–2018	US Créteil	15	(0)
2018–2019	SIMA Águilas		
2019	Royal Cappellen		
2020	Turris Turnu Măgurele		
2022–2023	Málaga City	11	(0)
2023	Nona FC	2	(0)
2023–2024	Delhi	20	(0)
2024–2026	Churchill Brothers	21	(6)
2026–	Sreenidi Deccan	3	(0)
- * Club domestic league appearances and goals as of 15 March 2026

Pape Alassane Gassama (born 1 September 1996) is a Senegalese professional footballer who plays as a central midfielder for Indian Football League club Sreenidi Deccan.

== Career ==
On 21 August 2019, Gassama joined Belgian club Royal Cappellen.
