= Álex Sánchez (footballer, born 1989) =

Spanish footballer

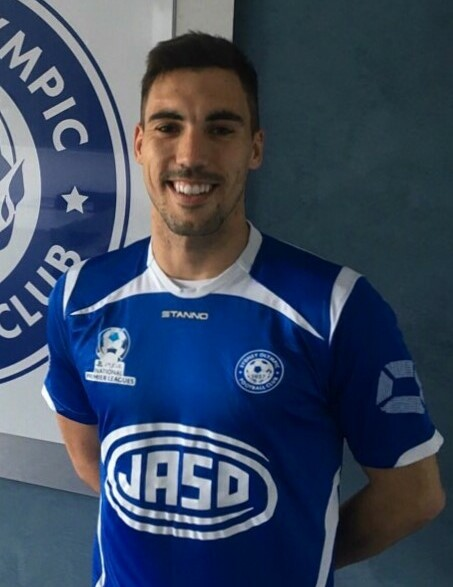
- Sánchez with Sydney Olympic in 2018

Personal information
- Full name: Alejandro Sánchez López
- Date of birth: 6 June 1989 (age 37)
- Place of birth: Zaragoza, Spain
- Height: 1.80 m (5 ft 11 in)
- Position: Striker

Youth career
- El Salvador
- 2004–2008: Zaragoza

Senior career*
Years	Team	Apps	(Gls)
2008–2009	Universidad Zaragoza	23	(23)
2008–2011	Zaragoza B	75	(41)
2009–2010	Zaragoza	3	(0)
2011–2012	Teruel	25	(5)
2012–2015	Tudelano	100	(34)
2015–2016	Osasuna	4	(0)
2016	→ Tudelano (loan)	8	(1)
2016–2017	Osasuna B	19	(6)
2017	Tudelano	10	(4)
2018–2019	Sydney Olympic	44	(34)
2020–2021	Tudelano	18	(5)
2021–2023	Ejea	46	(23)
2023	Utebo	15	(7)
2023–2024	Gokulam Kerala	22	(19)
2024	Malappuram		
2025	Sporting Bengaluru	6	(0)
- * Club domestic league appearances and goals as of 00:33, 10 September 2025 (UTC)

Alejandro 'Álex' Sánchez López (born 6 June 1989) is a Spanish professional footballer who plays as a striker.

He came to fame in 2009, when he became the first player to appear in a professional game with just one hand whilst representing Real Zaragoza.

== Club career ==
Born in Zaragoza, Aragon, Sánchez started his football career with local Colegio Jesús-María El Salvador, joining Real Zaragoza's youth system aged 15. In 2008, he began playing as a senior in both the national and regional leagues, with its B and C teams.

On 8 November 2009, Sánchez made his professional debut for the club, playing 20 minutes in the 3–1 La Liga away loss against Valencia CF after having come on as a substitute for Ángel Lafita. He became the first player to appear in a professional game with only one hand, but continued to be mainly registered with the reserves, however.

Sánchez rejected the offer to continue playing with Zaragoza B in mid-June 2011, going on to resume his career in the Segunda División B with CD Teruel and CD Tudelano. On 2 July 2015, after scoring 15 goals the previous campaign, he signed a two-year deal with Segunda División side CA Osasuna.

In January 2018, after representing in quick succession Tudelano (two spells) and Osasuna's second team, the 28-year-old Sánchez moved abroad for the first time and joined Sydney Olympic FC in the Australian National Premier Leagues NSW.

Sánchez subsequently competed in the Spanish lower leagues, with Tudelano, SD Ejea and Utebo FC. He went abroad again in July 2023, signing for I-League club Gokulam Kerala FC. On 5 November, he scored twice in a 4–1 home win over NEROCA FC. He added a hat-trick four days later, as the hosts defeated Rajasthan United FC 5–0.

== Career statistics ==
As of match played 12 April 2024

Appearances and goals by club, season and competition
Club	Season	League			Cup (Note: Includes Copa del Rey, Durand Cup, Super Cup)		Continental		Total	
Club	Season	Division	Apps	Goals	Apps	Goals	Apps	Goals	Apps	Goals
Universidad Zaragoza	2008–09	Regional Preferente	23	23	—		—		23	23
Zaragoza B	2008–09	Tercera División	79	42	—		—		79	42
Zaragoza B	2009–10	Tercera División	79	42	—		—		79	42
Zaragoza B	2010–11	Tercera División	79	42	—		—		79	42
Zaragoza B	Total		79	42	0	0	—		79	42
Zaragoza	2009–10	La Liga	3	0	—		—		3	0
Teruel	2011–12	Segunda División B	25	5	—		—		25	5
Tudelano	2012–13	Segunda División B	32	10	—		—		32	10
Tudelano	2013–14	Segunda División B	31	9	2	0	—		33	9
Tudelano	2014–15	Segunda División B	37	15	—		—		37	15
Tudelano	Total		100	34	2	0	—		102	34
Osasuna	2015–16	Segunda División	4	0	1	0	—		5	0
Tudelano (loan)	2015–16	Segunda División B	10	1	—		—		10	1
Osasuna B	2016–17	Segunda División B	19	6	—		—		19	6
Tudelano	2017–18	Segunda División B	10	4	—		—		10	4
Sydney Olympic	2018	NSW NPL1	24	21	—		—		24	21
Sydney Olympic	2019	NSW NPL1	20	13	—		—		20	13
Sydney Olympic	Total		44	34	—		—		44	34
Tudelano	2019–20	Segunda División B	6	1	—		—		6	1
Tudelano	2020–21	Segunda División B	12	4	—		—		12	4
Tudelano	Total		18	5	—		—		18	5
Ejea	2021–22	Segunda RFEF	32	13	—		—		32	13
Ejea	2022–23	Tercera Federación	14	10	—		—		14	10
Ejea	Total		46	23	—		—		46	23
Utebo	2022–23	Segunda Federación	17	7	—		—		17	7
Gokulam Kerala	2023–24	I-League	22	19	6	1	—		28	20
Career total			419	202	9	1	0	0	428	203

== Honours ==
Individual

- I-League top scorer: 2023–24 (19 goals)
