= Lunkim Seigoulun Khongsai =

Indian footballer

Lunkim Khongsai
Personal information
- Full name: Lunkim Seigoulun Khongsai
- Date of birth: 25 October 2000 (age 26)
- Place of birth: Tuibuong, Manipur, India
- Position: Central midfielder

Youth career
- 2017–2021: Sudeva Delhi

Senior career*
Years	Team	Apps	(Gls)
2021–2023	Sudeva Delhi	35	(0)
2023–2026	Rajasthan United	27	(1)
- * Club domestic league appearances and goals as of 22:00, 6 March 2026 (UTC)

Lunkim Seigoulun Khongsai (born 25 October 2000), commonly known by the nickname Gou Kuki, is an Indian professional footballer who plays as a midfielder.

== Club career ==
Born in Tuibuong, Manipur, Khongsai moved to Delhi in 2014 due to the violence and economic hardship. In 2017, Khongsai joined the youth academy at Sudeva. In 2019, he went to Spain and joined Tercera División side Olímpic de Xàtiva, which is affiliated with Sudeva Delhi.

On 9 January 2021, Khongsai made his professional debut for Sudeva Delhi in their opening I-League match against Mohammedan. He started and played 71 minutes as Sudeva were defeated 0–1.

In 2022–23 season, Sudeva Delhi got relegated from I-League.

== Career statistics ==
=== Club ===
As of 11 March 2023

Club	Season	League			Cup		AFC		Total	
Club	Season	Division	Apps	Goals	Apps	Goals	Apps	Goals	Apps	Goals
Sudeva Delhi	2020–21	I-League	8	0	0	0	—		8	0
Sudeva Delhi	2021–22	I-League	8	0	2 (Note: Appearance(s) in Durand Cup)	0	—		10	0
Sudeva Delhi	2022–23	I-League	19	0	4	0	—		23	0
Sudeva Delhi	Sudeva Delhi total		35	0	6	0	0	0	41	0
Rajasthan United	2023–24	I-League	0	0	0	0	—		0	0
Career total			35	0	6	0	0	0	41	0

== See also ==
- List of Indian football players in foreign leagues
