= Sérgio Barboza =

Brazilian association footballer

Personal information
- Full name: Sérgio Barboza da Silva Júnior
- Date of birth: 30 May 1993 (age 33)
- Place of birth: Rio de Janeiro, Brazil
- Height: 1.68 m (5 ft 6 in)
- Position: Winger

Team information
- Current team: Tohie'a

Youth career
- –2011: Flamengo

Senior career*
Years	Team	Apps	(Gls)
2011–2013	Macaé		
2013–2015	Olaria		
2015–2016	Limón		
2017	Comunicaciones B		
2017–2018	Juticalpa		
2018	Master 7		
2018–2019	Svay Rieng		
2019	Master 7		
2019–2020	Minerva Punjab	15	(4)
2021	Żejtun Corinthians	9	(1)
2021–2022	Delhi	6	(3)
2022	Suchitepéquez		
2022	Rajasthan United		
2023	Nona FC		
2023–2024	Delhi	21	(13)
2024	Malappuram		
2025	Dhangadhi		
2025–2026	Bravos do Maquis	1	(0)
2026	Tohie'a	5	(4)
- * Club domestic league appearances and goals

Sérgio Barboza da Silva Júnior (born 30 May 1993) is a Brazilian professional footballer who plays as a winger for Ligue 2 Moorea club Tohie'a.

== Club career ==
=== Early career ===
Born in Rio de Janeiro, Brazil, Barboza made his senior debut with Costa Rican Primera División side Limón in the 2015–16 season.

Barboza played for the Flamengo U20 side, but made no appearances on the senior squad and was transferred to Macaé in 2013. He then signed a two-year contract with Brazilian club Olaria and played for the club until 2015. In mid-2015, Barboza signed a year contract with Primera División side Limón. Barboza penned a deal with Guatemalan club Comunicaciones B in 2017, playing in Liga Nacional de Fútbol de Guatemala.

He then moved to Juticalpa in mid-2017 in the Honduran Liga Nacional de Ascenso. Then he transferred to Lao Premier League side Master 7, where he remained until 2018. He played for the Cambodian Premier League side Svay Rieng and returned to Master 7 in 2019 for a second spell at the Lao side.

=== India ===
Barboza was transferred to Indian I-League club Minerva Punjab, where he rose to fame. He played 15 games and scored four goals for the Punjab side in the I-League. He played his first game for the club on 1 December 2019, which they lost. In his third appearance Barboza scored a goal against defending champions Chennai City, and on 12 December 2019, he led the team to their first win in the season following a loss and a draw against East Bengal.

Barboza managed to score a brace against Aizawl on 20 December 2019, which equalized the game 3-3, and the fourth of his professional career against Gokulam Kerala, which secured his team's win.

In 2021, Barboza joined the newly formed Delhi and appeared in the 130th edition of the Durand Cup. He later appeared in the 2021 I-League Qualifiers, in which they finished in third position, and he scored three goals.

In August 2022, Rajasthan United completed the signing of Barboza on a one-year deal.

On 25 August, he missed the winning penalty on his debut for the club against East Bengal in the Durand Cup, in a 0–0 stalemate. Eleven days later, he scored his first goal for the club against Indian Navy which helped Rajasthan United qualify for the knockout stage of the Durand Cup. An excellent through ball by Gyamar Nikum was met by Barboza in the 89th-minute and he finished confidently past the goalkeeper to seal a 2–0 win for his team. He was also part of his team's Baji Rout Cup win in Odisha.

On 14 August 2023, Delhi announced the return of Barboza. He made his second debut on 30 October, playing at home at the Namdhari Stadium, Bhaini Ala, against TRAU in a 1–1 draw. His first goal came in the next match, against Rajasthan United on 2 November. Barboza captained his team to a 4–3 win at home; his goal came off a penalty in the 53rd-minute. Barboza scored a brace against Gokulam Kerala on 23 March 2024 resulting in a 2–0 away from home. He added a hattrick four days later, as the hosts defeated Shillong Lajong 3–1. He scored again in his club's final game of the season, a tap-in in the eighth minute of stoppage time against league leaders Mohammedan on 13 April, resulting in another 3–1 victory.

== Career statistics ==
=== Club ===
As of 17 April 2024

Club	Season	League			Cup		Continental		Total	
Club	Season	Division	Apps	Goals	Apps	Goals	Apps	Goals	Apps	Goals
Limón	2015–16	Primera División of Costa Rica	1	0	0	0	—		1	0
Master 7	2019	Lao Premier League	1	0	0	0	—		1	0
Minerva Punjab	2019–20	I-League	15	4	0	0	—		15	4
Żejtun Corinthians	2020–21	Maltese Premier League	9	1	1 (Note: Appearance(s) in Maltese FA Trophy)	0	—		10	1
Delhi	2021	I-League 2nd Division	6	3	4 (Note: Appearance(s) in Durand Cup)	0	—		10	3
Rajasthan United	2022–23	I-League	0	0	3	1	—		3	1
Nona FC	2023	USL League Two	0	0	2 (Note: Appearance(s) in U.S. Open Cup)	0	—		2	0
Delhi	2023–24	I-League	21	13	0	0	—		21	13
Career total			53	21	10	1	0	0	63	22

== Honours ==
Minerva Punjab

- Bodousa Cup runner-up: 2019

Rajasthan United

- Baji Rout Cup: 2022
