= Sri Bhaini Sahib =

- Village
- Location in Punjab, India Sri Bhaini Sahib (India)
- Coordinates: 30.8772531°N 76.0579852°E
- Country: India
- State: Punjab
- District: Ludhiana

Government
  - Type: Panchayati raj (India)
  - Body: Gram panchayat

Languages
  - Official: Punjabi
  - Other spoken: Hindi
- Time zone: UTC+5:30 (IST)
- Telephone code: 0161
- ISO 3166 code: IN-PB
- Vehicle registration: PB-10
- Website: ludhiana.nic.in

Sri Bhaini Sahib (previously known as Bhaini Bhoondar and Bhaini Ala and earlier also referred to as Bhaini Kookean and Ramdaspura) is a village located in the Ludhiana East tehsil, of Ludhiana district, Punjab, India. Sri Bhaini Sahib is an important historic place of Punjab, being the focal point of Namdhari sect of Sikhism, founded by Satguru Ram Singh.

== History ==
In the Vedic period, river Aravati used to flow here. The village gained prominence when Satguru Ram Singh made this place a center of the new Namdhari movement, after the fall of Sikh Empire in 1849. The initial focus of the movement was revival of the Sikh theology. The place used by Satguru Ram Singh to meditate came to be known as 'Akal Boonga'. In short time, the village started becoming populated and came to be referred as 'Bhaini Kookean' and then as 'Sri Bhaini Sahib'.

The British authorities took first notice of the village in 1863. In order to watch the proceedings at Sri Bhaini Sahib more closely, the British officials requested their higher authorities to set up a Telegraph Station at Ludhiana and strengthen their regiments in Sirhind division.

After a skirmish at Malerkotla, when the British authorities prepared case against the Namdhari (also called as Kuka) prisoners, the mere 'presence at Sri Bhaini Sahib' was proposed as evidence of 'waging war, attempting to wage war or abetting such war against the Queen'.

The village also hosted important events like 'Sri Guru Nanak Sarab Sampardaya' Conference in 1934 and 'Hindu-Sikh Milap Conference' in 1943. The aim of these conferences was to unite all denominations against the colonial rule.

Post-independence, the village has become a symbol of Indian traditions and a center of classical music learning.

== Recent events ==
In 2023, an inter-religious conference was held at Sri Bhaini Sahib, which was attended by leaders of many prominent religious denominations. The village has excellent sports facilities. Punjab Government expressed its interest in replicating the Bhaini Sahib Sports model to other areas of Punjab. Sri Bhaini Sahib regularly hosts classical music concerts, especially Saguru Jagjit Singh Sangit Sammelan, where maestros and legends from India and abroad give their performances.

== Administration ==
The village is administrated by a Sarpanch who is an elected representative of village as per constitution of India and Panchayati raj (India).

Particulars	Total	Male	Female
Total No. of Houses	625		
Population	2,934	1,542	1,392

== Demographics ==
=== Child sex ratio ===
The village population of children with an age group from 0-6 is 306 which makes up 10.43% of total population of village. Average Sex Ratio is 903 per 1000 males which is higher than the state average of 895. The child Sex Ratio as per census is 681, lower than average of 846 in the state of Punjab.

=== Caste ===
The village constitutes 10.77% of Scheduled Caste population and there isn't any Scheduled Tribe population.
