= Lalliansanga Renthlei =

Indian footballer (born 1999)

Personal information
- Date of birth: 5 June 1999 (age 27)
- Place of birth: Lunglei, Mizoram
- Position: Midfielder

Team information
- Current team: Chanmari

Youth career
- AIFF Elite Academy

Senior career*
Years	Team	Apps	(Gls)
2017–2019	Chennaiyin	0	(0)
2017–2019	Chennaiyin B	12	(0)
2019–2020	Indian Arrows	3	(0)
2020–2022	Sudeva Delhi	26	(0)
2022–2023	Rajasthan United	19	(0)
2023–2025	Odisha	0	(0)
2024	→ Gokulam Kerala (loan)	3	(1)
2024–2025	→ Churchill Brothers (loan)	12	(1)
2025–2026	Diamond Harbour	9	(1)
2026–	Chanmari	0	(0)

International career
2017	India U19	2	(0)
- * Club domestic league appearances and goals as of 22:33, 23 May 2026 (UTC)

Lalliansanga Renthlei (born 5 June 1999) is an Indian professional footballer who plays as a midfielder for Indian Football League club Chanmari.

== Career ==
After graduating from AIFF Elite Academy Samik was signed by Chennaiyin B in October 2017. He was sent on loan to Indian Arrows in 2019–20 season. He made his professional debut for the Indian Arrows side in the Arrow's first match of the 2019–20 season against Gokulam Kerala. He started and played till 68th minute as Indian Arrows lost 0–1.

== Career statistics ==
=== Club ===
As of 6 April 2025

Club	Season	League			Cup		AFC		Total	
Club	Season	Division	Apps	Goals	Apps	Goals	Apps	Goals	Apps	Goals
Chennaiyin B	2017–18	I-League 2nd Division	9	0	0	0	–		9	0
Chennaiyin B	2018–19	I-League 2nd Division	3	0	0	0	–		3	0
Chennaiyin B	Total		12	0	0	0	0	0	12	0
Indian Arrows	2019–20	I-League	3	0	0	0	–		3	0
Sudeva Delhi	2020–21	I-League	14	0	0	0	–		14	0
Sudeva Delhi	2021–22	I-League	12	0	3 (Note: Appearance(s) in Durand Cup)	0	–		15	0
Sudeva Delhi	Total		26	0	3	0	0	0	29	0
Rajasthan United	2022–23	I-League	19	0	6 (Note: Appearance(s) in Super Cup)	0	–		25	0
Odisha	2024–25	Indian Super League	0	0	3	0	–		3	0
Gokulam Kerala (loan)	2023–24	I-League	3	1	0	0	–		3	1
Churchill Brothers (loan)	2024–25	I-League	12	1	0	0	–		12	1
Diamond Harbour	2025–26	I-League	0	0	0	0	–		0	0
Career total			75	2	12	0	0	0	87	2
