= 2023–24 Real Kashmir FC season =

Real Kashmir
2023–24 season
- Chairman: Sandeep Chattoo
- Head coach: Ishfaq Ahmed
- Stadium: TRC Turf Ground, Srinagar, Jammu and Kashmir
- I-League: 5th
- Top goalscorer: League: Gnohere Krizo (12); All: Gnohere Krizo (12)
- Highest home attendance: 7,632 (v. Mohammedan, 23 March 2024)
- Lowest home attendance: 1,100 (v. Namdhari, 13 April 2024)
- Average home league attendance: 3,207
Home colours	Away colours

The 2023–24 season was the seventh season in Real Kashmir FC's existence, and their sixth season in I-League. Their first match of the season was played on 28 October 2023 and their last on 13 April 2024, in 1–4 defeat away from home against Namdhari. Real Kashmir finished fifth in the league. Their captain Muhammad Hammad received the Jarnail Singh Award for Best Defender of the season.

== Current technical staff ==
Position	Name
Head coach	(India) Ishfaq Ahmed
Assistant coach	(India) Harshad Meher
Head of Player recruitment	(India) Salman Mir
Physio	(India) Haider Ali
Psychologist	(India) Fadl Haq
Co-ordinator	(India) Fuzail Farooq
Nutrionist	(India) Athar Coutwall

=== First-team squad ===
As of 27 October 2023

Note: Flags indicate national team as defined under FIFA eligibility rules; some limited exceptions apply. Players may hold more than one non-FIFA nationality.

No.	Pos.	Nation	Player
1	GK	IND	Furqan Ahmad Dar
3	DF	IND	Sowban Hilal Sidiqui
4	DF	IND	Muhammad Hammad (captain)
5	MF	IND	Ifham Tariq Mir
6	DF	IND	Hyder Yousuf
7	MF	IND	Mohammad Inam
9	FW	CIV	Gnohere Krizo
10	FW	IND	Mohammad Asrar Rehber
11	FW	IND	Ateeb Ahmed Dar
12	MF	IND	Huzafah Ahmad Dar
13	GK	IND	Shivam Kiran Pednekar
14	FW	UGA	Henry Kisekka
16	DF	SYR	Shaher Shaheen

No.	Pos.	Nation	Player
17	MF	IND	Lalramdinsanga Ralte
18	DF	IND	Dion Menezes
20	DF	GHA	Kamal Issah
21	DF	IND	Zahid Yousuf
22	DF	POR	Carlos Lomba
25	FW	CIV	Kamo Bayi
26	DF	IND	Hafiz Ur Rehman Khan
27	MF	LBN	Mohamad Maksoud
28	MF	IND	Jeremy Laldinpuia
30	DF	IND	Wayne Vaz
31	DF	IND	Shahid Nazir
78	GK	IND	Muheet Shabir

== Contract extension ==
=== New contracts ===
Date	Position	No.	Player	Ref.

== Transfers ==
=== Transfers in ===
Date	Position	Nationality	Name	From	Fee	Ref.
22 October 2023	DF	(India)	Sowban Hilal Sidiqui	(India) Downtown Heroes		
23 October 2023	DF	(India)	Muhammad Hammad			
24 October 2023	GK	(India)	Muheet Shabir	(India) Kerala Blasters		
24 October 2023	FW	(India)	Mohamed Inam	(India) Delhi		
25 October 2023	FW	(India)	Mohammad Asrar Rehber	(India) FC1		
26 October 2023	DF	(India)	Shahid Nazir	(India) Downtown Heroes		
26 October 2023	DF	(Syria)	Shaher Shaheen	(India) Mohammedan		
27 October 2023	DF	(India)	Zahid Yousuf	(India) Downtown Heroes		
27 October 2023	FW	(Ivory Coast)	Gnohere Krizo	(India) Bhawanipore		
31 January 2024	FW	(Uganda)	Henry Kisekka			
31 January 2024	FW	(Ivory Coast)	Kamo Bayi			

=== Promoted from Real Kashmmir FC Reserves ===
No.	Name	Nationality	Position(s)	Date of Birth (Age)	Ref.

=== Transfers out ===
Date from	Position	Nationality	Name	To	Fee	Ref.
1 July 2023	DF	(India)	Jestin George	(India) NorthEast United	Loan Return	
6 July 2023	GK	(India)	Prateek Kumar	(India) Chennaiyin	Free Transfer	
7 July 2023	MF	(India)	Abhijit Sarkar	(India) Mohammedan	Free Transfer	
17 July 2023	MF	(India)	Girik Khosla	(India) Delhi	Free Transfer	
21 July 2023	MF	(India)	Samuel Kynshi	(India) Punjab	Free Transfer	
30 July 2023	MF	(India)	Lalnuntluanga Bawitlung	(India) Sreenidi Deccan	Free Transfer	
30 July 2023	GK	(India)	Subhasish Roy	(India) Churchill Brothers	Free Transfer	
31 July 2023	FW	(India)	Phrangki Buam	(India) Shillong Lajong	Free Transfer	
31 July 2023	MF	(Tajikistan)	Nuriddin Davronov	(Malaysia) Kuching City	Free Transfer	
1 September 2023	MF	(India)	Thoi Singh	(India) NEROCA	Free Transfer	
3 September 2023	DF	(India)	Balwinder Singh	(India) NEROCA	Free Transfer	
3 September 2023	DF	(India)	Akashdeep Singh	(India) Namdhari	Free Transfer	
3 September 2023	DF	(Ghana)	Richard Osei		Free Transfer	
3 September 2023	MF	(Ghana)	Wadudu Yakubu		Free Transfer	
3 September 2023	FW	(Ghana)	Ibrahim Nurudeen	(Syria) Al-Horriya	Free Transfer	
3 September 2023	MF	(India)	Owais Bashir	(India)	Free Transfer	
3 September 2023	MF	(India)	Nestor Dias	(India)	Free Transfer	
3 September 2023	MF	(India)	Adnan Ayub	(India)	Free Transfer	
3 September 2023	FW	(India)	Loken Meitei	(India) Delhi	Free Transfer	
3 September 2023	FW	(India)	Parveez Hussain Parray	(India)	Free Transfer	
3 September 2023	DF	(India)	Joyner Lourenco	(India) Sporting Goa	Free Transfer	
3 September 2023	DF	(India)	Kamalpreet Singh	(India)	Free Transfer	
3 September 2023	MF	(India)	Rupert Nongrum	(India)	Free Transfer	
3 September 2023	FW	(Ghana)	Ernest Boateng	(Bangladesh) Rahmatganj MFS	Free Transfer	
3 September 2023	DF	(India)	Paolenmang Tuboi	(India)	Free Transfer	
3 September 2023	DF	(India)	Davinder Singh	(India) Namdhari	Free Transfer	
3 September 2023	GK	(India)	Sanjiban Ghosh	(India) Bhawanipore	Free Transfer	
3 September 2023	DF	(India)	Sarineo Fernandes	(India) Bengaluru United	Free Transfer	
3 September 2023	GK	(India)	Imran Arshid	(India) Downtown Heroes	Free Transfer	
3 September 2023	FW	(India)	Jerry Pulamte	(India) Bengaluru United	Free Transfer	
30 January 2024	MF	(India)	Kiran Pandhare	(India) NEROCA	Free Transfer	

== Competition ==
=== Overview ===
Win Draw Loss

Competition	First match	Last match	Starting round	Record							
Competition	First match	Last match	Starting round	Pld	W	D	L	GF	GA	GD	Win %
Super Cup	2023	2023	Qualifiers	0	0	0	0	0	0	+0	—
I-League	28 October 2023	2024	Matchday 1	20	10	6	4	31	13	+18	50.00
Total				20	10	6	4	31	13	+18	50.00

Last updated: 17 March 2024
Source: Soccerway

=== I-League ===
==== League table ====
Pos	Team	Pld	W	D	L	GF	GA	GD	Pts
3	Gokulam Kerala	24	12	6	6	55	34	+21	42
4	Inter Kashi	24	11	8	5	47	41	+6	41
5	Real Kashmir	24	11	7	6	36	19	+17	40
6	Delhi	24	11	2	11	44	40	+4	35
7	Churchill Brothers	24	9	6	9	40	31	+9	33

Source: I-League
Rules for classification: 1) Points; 2) Head-to-head points; 3) Head-to-head goal difference; 4) Total goal difference; 5) Total number of goals scored; 6) drawing of lots
(Note: Head-to-head record is used only after all the matches between the teams in question have been played).

==== League results by round ====
Match	1	2	3	4	5	6	7	8	9	10	11	12	13	14	15	16	17	18	19	20	21	22	23
Ground	H	H	H	A	-	A	H	H	H	H	H	A	A	A	A	A	A	A	A	H			
Result	W	W	L	L	-	W	W	D	D	W	W	W	L	W	D	W	W	D	D	D			
League Position	2	2	4	5	5	4	3	3	4	3	2	2	3	2	2	2	2	2	3	3			

Updated to match(es) played on 17 March 2024. Source:
A = Away; H = Home; W = Win; D = Draw; L = Loss

==== Matches ====
28 October 2023 1	Real Kashmir	2–0	Rajasthan United	Srinagar
14:00 IST	Wayne Vaz 49'; Shaher Shaheen 90+7'	Report		Stadium: TRC Turf Ground; Attendance: 1,872; Man of the Match: Wayne Vaz (Real Kashmir)

4 November 2023 2	Real Kashmir	1–0	TRAU	Srinagar
14:00 IST	Jeremy Laldinpuia 45'	Report		Stadium: TRC Turf Ground; Attendance: 6,200; Referee: Jatinder Singh; Man of the Match: Jeremy Laldinpuia

8 November 2023 3	Real Kashmir	1–3	Churchill Brothers	Srinagar
14:00 IST	Ateeb Ahmed Dar 45'	Report	Carlos Lomba 26' (o.g.); Ricardo Dichiara 60', 62'	Stadium: TRC Turf Ground; Attendance: 4,728; Referee: Surojit Das; Man of the Match: Ricardo Dichiara (Churchill Brothers)

11 November 2023 4	Namdhari	1–0	Real Kashmir	Bhaini Sahib
14:00 IST	Harmanpreet Singh 36'			Stadium: Namdhari Stadium; Attendance: 300; Referee: Williams Joy Koshy; Man of the Match: Akashdeep Singh (Namdhari)

23 November 2023 5	NEROCA	0–4	Real Kashmir	Kalyani
16:30 IST		Report	Mohammad Asrar Rehber 11'; Gnohere Krizo 19'; Jeremy Laldinpuia 64'; Mohamad Maksoud 90+5'	Stadium: Kalyani Stadium; Man of the Match: Muhammad Hammad

28 November 2023 6	Real Kashmir	4–0	Inter Kashi	Srinagar
14:00 IST	Mohammad Inam Wani 30'; Carlos Lomba 66'; Gnohere Krizo 83'; Mohamad Maksoud 90+5'	Report		Stadium: TRC Turf Ground; Attendance: 3,172; Referee: Anand Rana; Man of the Match: Mohammad Inam (Real Kashmir)

2 December 2023 7	Real Kashmir	0–0	Aizawl	Srinagar
14:00 IST		Report		Stadium: TRC Turf Ground; Attendance: 3,659; Referee: Lakshay; Man of the Match: Nora Fernandes (Aizawl)

7 December 2023 8	Real Kashmir	0–0	Sreenidi Deccan	Srinagar
14:00 IST		Report		Stadium: TRC Turf Ground; Attendance: 2,500; Referee: Mithun Kumar Kundu; Man of the Match: R. Lalbiakliana (Sreenidi)

11 December 2023 9	Real Kashmir	3–0	Gokulam Kerala	Srinagar
11:00 IST	Krizo 31', 64'; Laldinpuia 59'	Report		Stadium: TRC Turf Ground; Attendance: 0 Referee: Dipu Roy; Man of the Match: Carlos Lomba (Real Kashmir)

16 December 2023 10	Real Kashmir	3–1	Shillong Lajong	Srinagar
14:00 IST	Isaah 5'; Krizo 55'; Inam 69'	Report	Abdou Karim Samb 16'	Stadium: TRC Turf Ground; Attendance: 3,740; Referee: Jehrul Islam; Man of the Match: Mohammad Inam (Real Kashmir)

24 December 2023 11	Delhi	1–0	Real Kashmir	Bhaini Sahib
14:00 IST	Hudson Jesus 77'	Report		Stadium: Namdhari Stadium; Attendance: 918; Referee: Tanmoy Dhar; Man of the Match: Hudson Jesus (Delhi)

4 February 2024 12	Mohammedan	0–3	Real Kashmir	Kolkata
19:00 IST		Report	Shaher Shaheen 55'; Gnohere Krizo 65', 90+5' (pen.)	Stadium: Naihati Stadium; Referee: Aditya Purkayastha

9 February 2024 13	Rajasthan United	1–0	Real Kashmir	Bhaini Ala
14:00 IST	Marin Mudrazija 90+2'	Report		Stadium: Namdhari Stadium; Attendance: 100; Referee: Akashkumar Mehta; Man of the Match: Marin Mudrazija (Rajasthan United)

17 February 2024 14	Churchill Brothers	0–2	Real Kashmir	Vasco
19:00 IST		Report	Gnohere Krizo 66'; Kamo Bayi 90+9'	Stadium: Tilak Maidan; Attendance: 825; Referee: Mithun Kumar Kundu; Man of the Match: Gnohere Krizo (Real Kashmir)

24 February 2024 15	Inter Kashi	1–1	Real Kashmir	Kolkata
16:30 IST	Mario Barco 77'	Report	Henry Kisekka 90+6'	Stadium: Kalyani Stadium; Attendance: 447; Referee: Ashish Tiwari; Man of the Match: Mohammad Inam (Real Kashmir)

28 February 2024 16	Aizawl	0–1	Real Kashmir	Aizawl
19:00 IST		Report	Henry Kisekka 15'	Stadium: Rajiv Gandhi Stadium; Attendance: 1,246; Referee: Lalit Singh Rawat; Man of the Match: Henry Kisekka (Real Kashmir)

4 March 2024 17	Sreenidi Deccan	2–3	Real Kashmir	Hyderabad
16:30 IST	Rilwan Olanrewaju Hassan 58'; Eli Sabiá 61'	Report	Gnohere Krizo 45+4', 90+2' (pen.); Ifham Mir 87'	Stadium: Deccan Arena; Attendance: 168; Referee: Rahul Kumar Gupta; Man of the Match: Gnohere Krizo (Real Kashmir)

10 March 2024 18	Gokulam Kerala	1–1	Real Kashmir	Kozhikode
19:00 IST	Matija Babovic 68'	Report	Gnohere Krizo 65'	Stadium: EMS Stadium; Attendance: 2,023; Referee: Aditya Purkayastha; Man of the Match: Matija Babovic (Gokulam Kerala)

13 March 2024 19	Shillong Lajong	1–1	Real Kashmir	Shillong
19:00 IST	Renan Paulino 90+7'	Report	Adnan Ayub 11'	Stadium: SSA Stadium; Attendance: 7,151; Referee: Akashkumar Mehta; Man of the Match: Adnan Ayub (Real Kashmir)

17 March 2024 20	Real Kashmir	1–1	Delhi	Srinagar
14:00 IST	Gurtej Singh 52'	Report	Anwar Ali Sr 82' (o.g.)	Stadium: TRC Turf Ground; Attendance: 1,635; Referee: Jatinder Singh; Man of the Match: Gurtej Singh (Real Kashmir)

23 March 2024 21	Real Kashmir	0–0	Mohammedan	Srinagar
14:00 IST		Report		Stadium: TRC Turf Ground; Attendance: 7,632; Referee: Harish Kundu; Man of the Match: Muhammad Hammad (Real Kashmir)

30 March 2024 22	Real Kashmir	3–0	NEROCA	Srinagar
14:00 IST	Krizo 35'; Yousuf 45'; Shaheen 67'	Report		Stadium: TRC Turf Ground; Attendance: 2,254; Referee: Aditya Purkayastha; Man of the Match: Hyder Yousuf (Real Kashmir)

6 April 2024 23	TRAU	2–1	Real Kashmir	Kalyani
16:30 IST	Aribam 56'; R. Singh 90+9'	Report	Lomba 59'	Stadium: Kalyani Stadium; Attendance: 123; Referee: Lalit Singh Rawat; Man of the Match: Robinson Singh (TRAU)

13 April 2024 24	Real Kashmir	1–4	Namdhari	Srinagar
14:30 IST	Ralte 86'	Report	Abeiku 20'; Arana 24' (pen.); Manv. Singh 60', 90'	Stadium: TRC Turf Ground; Attendance: 1,100; Referee: Lakshay; Man of the Match: Stephen Abeiku (Namdhari)

== Statistics ==
=== Goal Scorers ===
As of 13 March 2024

Rank	No.	Pos.	Nat.	Name	I League	IFA Shield	Super Cup	Total
1	9	FW	(Ivory Coast)	Gnohere Krizo	12	0	0	12
2	16	DF	(Syria)	Shaher Shaheen	3	0	0	3
2	28	MF	(India)	Jeremy Laldinpuia	3	0	0	3
4	7	MF	(India)	Mohammad Inam	2	0	0	2
4	14	FW	(Uganda)	Henry Kisekka	2	0	0	2
4	27	MF	(Lebanon)	Mohamad Maksoud	2	0	0	2
7	5	MF	(India)	Ifham Mir Toufiq	1	0	0	1
7	6	DF	(India)	Hyder Yousuf	1	0	0	1
7	10	FW	(India)	Mohammad Asrar Rehber	1	0	0	1
7	20	MF	(Ghana)	Kamal Isaah	1	0	0	1
7	22	DF	(Portugal)	Carlos Lomba	1	0	0	1
7	25	FW	(Ivory Coast)	Kamo Bayi	1	0	0	1
7	29	MF	(India)	Adnan Ayub	1	0	0	1
7	30	DF	(India)	Wayne Vaz	1	0	0	1
Total					32	0	0	32
