= 2023–24 NEROCA FC season =

2023–24 football season for NEROCA Football Club

NEROCA
2023–24 season
- Head coach: Jacob Joseph (until 9 February 2024); Gyan Moyon (from 5 November to 9 February 2024)
- Stadium: SSA Stadium
- I-League: 12th
- Top goalscorer: League: Ansumana Kromah (6); All: Ansumana Kromah (6)
- Highest home attendance: 2,500 (v. Shillong Lajong, 18 February 2024)
- Lowest home attendance: 50 (v. Churchill Brothers, 8 March 2024)
- Average home league attendance: 356

The 2023–24 season was the 58th season of NEROCA FC in existence and seventh season in the I-League.

NEROCA had a poor campaign and could gather only 13 points from 21 matches. Their loss against Real Kashmir on 30 March 2024 confirmed their relegation to I-League 2. By then, they had managed four wins, one draw, and 16 losses. Their final fixture of the season was cancelled after they refused to travel to Aizawl citing security concerns. The final game they played was at home against Gokulam Kerala on 7 April 2024, which ended in a 0–3 defeat.

== Players ==
=== First-team squad ===
As of 30 January 2024

Note: Flags indicate national team as defined under FIFA eligibility rules; some limited exceptions apply. Players may hold more than one non-FIFA nationality.

No.	Pos.	Nation	Player
1	GK	IND	Soram Poirei
2	DF	IND	Balwinder Singh
3	DF	IND	Surajit Seal
4	DF	IND	Likmabam Rakesh Meitei
6	MF	IND	Sarif Khan
7	FW	LBR	Ansumana Kromah
8	MF	IND	Aniket Panchal
9	FW	LBN	Haidar Awada
11	MF	IND	Nonganba Akoijam
12	DF	IND	Waikhom Rohit Meitei
13	MF	JAM	Fabian Reid
14	MF	IND	Lourembam David Singh
15	MF	CIV	Adama Coulibaly
16	DF	IND	Manoranjan Singh
18	DF	SLE	David Simbo (captain)
19	MF	IND	Sajal Bag
21	GK	IND	Priyant Singh
23	MF	IND	Baoringdao Bodo

No.	Pos.	Nation	Player
24	FW	IND	Arghya Roy
25	MF	IND	Jonychand Singh
26	DF	IND	Wangkhei Olen Singh
30	MF	IND	Sushil Meitei
31	GK	IND	Irengbam Santosh Singh
40	MF	IND	Tangva Ragui
44	DF	IND	Nongthombam Ronaldo
66	DF	IND	Safiul Rahman
78	MF	IND	Anirudh Tumuluru
88	MF	IND	Tarak Hembram
99	FW	GHA	Ibrahim Nurudheen
—	MF	IND	Chunsaba Bariam
—	MF	IND	Thoi Singh
—	DF	IND	Pandia Rajan
—	GK	IND	Chris Johnson
—	DF	IND	Lallenmang Sitlhou
—	FW	IND	Yumnam Singh
—	MF	IND	Kiran Pandhare

=== New and extended contracts ===
Date	Position	Nationality	Name	Ref.
10 September 2023	MF	(India)	Tangva Ragui	
10 September 2023	DF	(India)	Likmabam Rakesh Singh	
10 September 2023	GK	(India)	Soram Poirei	
15 September 2023	DF	(India)	Waikhom Rohit Meitei	
15 September 2023	MF	(India)	Nonganba Akoijam	
15 September 2023	MF	(India)	Lourembam David Singh	
17 September 2023	DF	(Sierra Leone)	David Simbo	

== Transfers ==
=== Transfers in ===
Date	Position	Nationality	Name	From	Fee	Ref.
1 September 2023	MF	(India)	Thoi Singh	(India) Real Kashmir	None	
1 September 2023	DF	(India)	Surajit Seal	(India) ARA FC	None	
1 September 2023	DF	(India)	Monoranjan Singh	(India) Bhawanipore	None	
2 September 2023	GK	(India)	Priyant Singh	(India) Kidderpore	None	
3 September 2023	MF	(India)	Sushil Meitei	(India) Kickstart	None	
3 September 2023	DF	(India)	Balwinder Singh	(India) Real Kashmir	None	
4 September 2023	MF	(India)	Sarif Khan	(India) TRAU	None	
6 September 2023	DF	(India)	Pandia Rajan	(Portugal) Valadares Gaia	None	
7 September 2023	DF	(India)	Safiul Rahman	(India) Mohammedan	None	
9 September 2023	GK	(India)	Chris Johnson	(India) Salsette Football Club	None	
13 September 2023	FW	(India)	Arghya Roy	(India) Kidderpore	None	
13 September 2023	MF	(India)	Tarak Hembram	(India) United SC	None	
14 September 2023	DF	(India)	Wangkhei Olen Singh	(India) Delhi	None	
14 September 2023	MF	(India)	Aniket Panchal	(India) Mumbai Kenkre	None	
14 September 2023	MF	(India)	Anirudh Tumuluru		None	
30 September 2023	MF	(Romania)	Bogdan Gavrila	(Romania) Dinamo București	None	
30 September 2023	DF	(Romania)	Marius Leca	(Romania) Afumați	None	
1 October 2023	MF	(India)	Mohammad Saukat		None	
6 October 2023	FW	(India)	Vivek Singh		None	
11 October 2023	MF	(India)	Sajal Bag	(India) Chennaiyin	None	
16 October 2023	FW	(Lebanon)	Haidar Awada	(Lebanon) Ahli Nabatieh	None	
5 November 2023	MF	(Jamaica)	Fabian Reid	(Jamaica) Arnett Gardens	None	
25 November 2023	FW	(Liberia)	Ansumana Kromah	(India) Bodoland FC	None	
10 January 2024	MF	(Ivory Coast)	Adama Coulibaly	(Brunei) Kasuka	None	
12 January 2024	FW	(Ghana)	Ibrahim Nurudheen	(Syria) Al-Hurriya	None	
30 January 2024	MF	(India)	Kiran Pandhare	(India) Real Kashmir	None	
15 February 2024	MF	(India)	Baoringdao Bodo		None	

=== Loans in ===
Date from	Position	Nationality	Name	From	Date until	Ref.

=== Transfers out ===
Date	Position	Nationality	Name	To	Fee	Ref.
1 April 2023	FW	(Jamaica)	Jourdain Fletcher	(Jamaica) Mount Pleasant	Free Agent	
1 June 2023	MF	(India)	Naorem Tondomba Singh	(India) Mumbai City	Loan Return	
7 July 2023	DF	(India)	Thokchom James Singh	(India) Mohammedan	Free Agent	
23 July 2023	MF	(Uzbekistan)	Mirjalol Kosimov	(India) Mohammedan	Free Agent	
27 July 2023	FW	(India)	Surchandra Singh	(India) BSS Sporting	Free Agent	
27 July 2023	MF	(India)	Thomyo Shimray	(India) SC Bengaluru	Free Agent	
27 July 2023	GK	(India)	Shubham Dhas	(India) Inter Kashi	Free Agent	
1 August 2023	MF	(India)	Benjamin Lupheng		Free Agent	
1 August 2023	DF	(India)	Thokchom Johnson Singh		Free Agent	
1 August 2023	GK	(India)	Md Abujar		Free Agent	
1 August 2023	DF	(India)	Abhisekh Saikia		Free Agent	
1 August 2023	DF	(India)	Yuno Richard Thaikho		Free Agent	
1 August 2023	FW	(India)	Souma Das		Free Agent	
1 August 2023	DF	(India)	Aimol Reamsochung		Free Agent	
27 October 2023	FW	(India)	Lunminlen Haokip	(India) Churchill Brothers FC	Free Agent	
03 January 2024	DF	(Romania)	Marius Leca		Free Agent	
03 January 2024	FW	(Romania)	Bogdan Gavrila		Free Agent	

== Pre-season and friendlies ==
16 September 2023 Friendly	NEROCA	2–1	Manipur State Team	Imphal
09:00 IST			Aniket Panchal; jonychand	Stadium: SAI Football Ground

30 September 2023 Friendly	NEROCA	2–0	Classic FA	Imphal
09:00 IST			Arghya Roy; Tarak Hembram	Stadium: Loitang Football Arena

== Competitions ==
=== I-League ===
==== League table ====
Pos	Team	Pld	W	D	L	GF	GA	GD	Pts	Qualification
9	Namdhari	24	7	6	11	29	40	−11	27	
10	Aizawl	22	6	7	9	36	35	+1	25	
11	Rajasthan United	24	6	7	11	40	63	−23	25	
12	NEROCA (R)	23	4	2	17	26	61	−35	14	Relegation to I-League 2
13	TRAU (R)	23	4	1	18	26	64	−38	13	Relegation to I-League 2

Source: I-League
Rules for classification: 1) Points; 2) Head-to-head points; 3) Head-to-head goal difference; 4) Total goal difference; 5) Total number of goals scored; 6) drawing of lots
(Note: Head-to-head record is used only after all the matches between the teams in question have been played).
(R) Relegated

==== Matches ====
Note: I-League announced the fixtures for the 2023–24 season on 6 October 2023.

29 October 2023 1	Sreenidi Deccan	4–0	NEROCA	Hyderabad
16:30 IST	Castañeda 22', 84' (pen.); Lalromawia 57'; R Lalbiakliana 90+5'	Report		Stadium: Deccan Arena; Attendance: 750; Referee: Akashkumar Mehta; Man of the Match: David Castañeda (Sreenidi Deccan)

5 November 2023 2	Gokulam Kerala	4–1	NEROCA	Kozhikode
19:00 IST	Nili Perdomo 28'; Álex Sánchez 48', 86' (pen.); Justine Emmanuel 84'	Report	David Simbo 83'	Stadium: EMS Stadium; Attendance: 10,485; Referee: K. Ramadasan; Man of the Match: Álex Sánchez (Gokulam Kerala)

9 November 2023 3	Shillong Lajong	1–1	NEROCA	Shillong
14:00 IST	Daniel Gonçalves 34'	Report	Fabian Reid 79'	Stadium: SSA Stadium; Man of the Match: Renan Paulino (Shillong)

14 November 2023 4	NEROCA	1–3	Aizawl	Kolkata
19:00 IST	Tarak Hembram 33'	Report	Lalrinzuala Lalbiaknia 62', 81', 90+6'	Stadium: Kalyani Stadium; Man of the Match: Lalrinzuala Lalbiaknia(Aizawl)

18 November 2023 5	NEROCA	2–1	Namdhari	Kolkata
19:00 IST	Sushil Meitei 37'; Aniket Panchal 90+1'	Report	Imanol Arana 63'	Stadium: Kalyani Stadium; Man of the Match: Imanol Arana (Namdhari)

23 November 2023 6	NEROCA	0–4	Real Kashmir	Kolkata
16:30 IST		Report	Mohammad Asrar Rehber 11'; Gnohere Krizo 19'; Jeremy Laldinpuia 64'; Mohamad Maksoud 90+5'	Stadium: Kalyani Stadium; Man of the Match: Muhammad Hammad(Real Kashmir)

27 November 2023 7	Delhi	3–4	NEROCA	Bhaini Sahib
14:00 IST	Aroldinho 81'; Sérgio Barboza 85', 90'	Report	Tangva Ragui 16'; Balwinder Singh 73'; David Singh 77'; Aniket Panchal 78'	Stadium: Namdhari Stadium; Man of the Match: David Simbo (NEROCA)

1 December 2023 8	NEROCA	1–3	Inter Kashi	Kolkata
19:00 IST	Meitei 63'	Report	Lamela 28', 45+5'; J. Singh 90+4'	Stadium: Kalyani Stadium; Referee: Kynsanphar Lyngdoh Nongum; Man of the Match: Jordan Lamela (Inter Kashi)

9 December 2023 9	Churchill Brothers	4–1	NEROCA	Vasco
19:00 IST	Faisal Ali 9', 15'; Stendly Fernandes 32'; Ricardo Dichiara 90+4'	Report	Ansumana Kromah 47'	Stadium: Tilak Maidan; Man of the Match: Faisal Ali (Churchill)

15 December 2023 10	NEROCA	3–4	Rajasthan United	Kolkata
19:00 IST	Dário Júnior 45+3' (o.g.); Ansumana Kromah 81'; Lourembam David 86'	Report	Syed Suhail Pasha 24'; Lalchungnunga Chhangte 45+4'; Richardson Denzell 53', 84'	Stadium: Kalyani Stadium; Man of the Match: Richardson Denzell (Rajasthan United)

24 December 2023 11	Mohammedan	2–1	NEROCA	Kolkata
19:00 IST	Lalhlansanga 19'; Fanai 30'	Report	Simbo 50'	Stadium: Naihati Stadium; Attendance: 1,821; Referee: Anand Rana; Man of the Match: Lalremsanga Fanai (Mohammedan)

14 February 2024 14	Namdhari	3–2	NEROCA	Bhaini Sahib
14:00 IST	Akashdeep Singh 35'; Harmanpreet Singh 43'; Amey Bhatkal 90+2'	Report	Sajal Bag 24'; Sarif Khan 83'	Stadium: Namdhari Stadium; Attendance: 300; Referee: Lakshay; Man of the Match: Akashdeep Singh (Namdhari)

18 February 2024 15	NEROCA	0–2	Shillong Lajong	Shillong
16:30 IST		Report	Lhuid 52', 62'	Stadium: SSA Stadium; Attendance: 2,500; Referee: Surojit Das; Man of the Match: Kynsaibor Lhuid (Shillong Lajong)

23 February 2024 16	NEROCA	1–2	Delhi	Shillong
19:00 IST	Coulibaly 59'	Report	Muratov 4'; Rawat 21'	Stadium: SSA Stadium; Attendance: 100; Referee: Jatinder Singh; Man of the Match: Shokhrukhbek Muratov (Delhi)

27 February 2024 17	Inter Kashi	3–1	NEROCA	Kalyani
16:30 IST	Lalrindika 45+3'; Md. Asif 67'; Barco 73'	Report	Lourembam David Singh 53'	Stadium: Kalyani Stadium; Attendance: 187; Referee: Williams Joy Koshy; Man of the Match: Edmund Lalrindika (Inter Kashi)

8 March 2024 18	NEROCA	2–3	Churchill Brothers	Shillong
19:00 IST	Kromah 8'; Panchal 45+3'	Report	Abdou Karim Samb 22', 75', 86'	Stadium: SSA Stadium; Attendance: 50; Referee: Mithun Kumar Kundu; Man of the Match: Abdou Karim Samb (Churchill Brothers)

11 March 2024 19	Rajasthan United	5–1	NEROCA	Bhaini Sahib
14:00 IST	Richardson Denzell 20'; Marin Mudrazija 26', 54', 80'; Sairuat Kima 90'	Report	Lourembam David Singh 40'	Stadium: Namdhari Stadium; Attendance: 100; Referee: Tanmoy Dhar; Man of the Match: Marin Mudrazija (Rajasthan United)

17 March 2024 20	NEROCA	0–2	Mohammedan	Shillong
16:30 IST		Report	Eddie Hernández 42', 55'	Stadium: SSA Stadium; Attendance: 150; Referee: Jehrul Islam; Man of the Match: Eddie Hernández (Mohammedan)

21 March 2024 12	NEROCA	1–0	TRAU	Shillong
19:00 IST	Kromah 79'	Report		Stadium: SSA Stadium; Attendance: 100; Referee: Akashkumar Mehta; Man of the Match: Ansumana Kromah (NEROCA)

24 March 2024 21	TRAU	1–2	NEROCA	Kalyani
19:00 IST	TS Singh 77'	Report	Kromah 48' (pen.); LD Singh 65'	Stadium: Kalyani Stadium; Attendance: 152; Referee: Mithun Kumar Kundu; Man of the Match: Lourembam David Singh (NEROCA)

30 March 2024 22	Real Kashmir	3–0	NEROCA	Srinagar
14:00 IST	Krizo 35'; Yousuf 45'; Shaheen 67'	Report		Stadium: TRC Turf Ground; Attendance: 2,254; Referee: Aditya Purkayastha; Man of the Match: Hyder Yousuf (Real Kashmir)

4 April 2024 13	NEROCA	1–1	Sreenidi Deccan	Shillong
16:30 IST	Meitei 70' (pen.)	Report	Castañeda 82' (pen.)	Stadium: SSA Stadium; Attendance: 200; Referee: Surojit Das; Man of the Match: Khoirom Jackson Singh (NEROCA)

7 April 2024 23	NEROCA	0–3	Gokulam Kerala	Shillong
19:00 IST		Report	Tursunov 44'; Sánchez 90+1', 90+3'	Stadium: SSA Stadium; Attendance: 100; Referee: K. Lyngdoh Nongum; Man of the Match: Álex Sánchez (Gokulam Kerala)

12 April 2024 24	Aizawl	Cancelled	NEROCA	Aizawl
19:00 IST				Stadium: Rajiv Gandhi Stadium

== Statistics ==
=== Goalscorers ===
Rnk	Pos	No.	Player	I League	Total
1	FW	7	(Liberia) Ansumana Kromah	5	5
2	MF	99	(India) Lourembam David Singh	4	4
3	MF	8	(India) Aniket Panchal	3	3
4	MF	30	(India) Sushil Meitei	2	2
5	DF	2	(India) Balwinder Singh	1	1
5	MF	5	(India) Sarif Khan	1	1
5	FW	13	(Jamaica) Fabian Reid	1	1
5	DF	18	(Sierra Leone) David Simbo	1	1
5	MF	19	(India) Sajal Bag	1	1
5	MF	40	(India) Tangva Ragui	1	1
5	FW	88	(India) Tarak Hembram	1	1
Total				21	21
