= 2023–24 I-League =

16th season of the I-League

I-League
- Season: 2023–24
- Dates: 28 October 2023 – 13 April 2024
- Champions: Mohammedan (1st title)
- Promoted: Mohammedan
- Relegated: NEROCA; TRAU
- Matches: 154
- Goals: 503 (3.27 per match)
- Top goalscorer: Álex Sánchez (19 goals)
- Biggest home win: Churchill Brothers 7–0 Rajasthan United (10 April 2024)
- Biggest away win: TRAU 0–5 Sreenidi Deccan (19 November 2023)
- Highest scoring: Rajasthan United 5–4 TRAU (22 December 2023); Inter Kashi 5–4 Aizawl (18 March 2024); Rajasthan United 3–6 Delhi (5 April 2024)
- Longest winning run: 6 matches Gokulam Kerala
- Longest unbeaten run: Mohammedan; Inter Kashi (11 games)
- Longest winless run: NEROCA (11 games)
- Longest losing run: NEROCA (11 games)
- Highest attendance: 24,678; Mohammedan 1–3 Delhi (13 April 2024)
- Lowest attendance: 50; NEROCA 2–3 Churchill Brothers (8 March 2024)
- Total attendance: 293,962
- Average attendance: 1,933

The 2023–24 I-League was the 17th season of the I-League and the second season as the second tier of Indian football league system.

Mohammedan won the I-League for the first time and were promoted to the Indian Super League, while TRAU and NEROCA were relegated to I-League 2.

== Changes from last season ==
Promoted to Indian Super League

- RoundGlass Punjab ▲

Promoted from I-League 2

- Delhi ▲
- Shillong Lajong ▲

Relegated to I-League 2

- Mumbai Kenkre ▼
- Sudeva Delhi ▼

Corporate entries

The AIFF accepted five bids for direct entry to I-League.

- Inter Kashi
- Namdhari

Bunkerhill Pvt Ltd (Ambala) withdrew its bid after inking a majority shareholding in Mohammedan. Nimida United Sports Development Pvt Ltd (Bengaluru United) and Concatenate Advest Advisory Pvt Ltd (Delhi) were unable to fulfill the bid conditions.

Inter Kashi, from a tier-2 city (Varanasi), will have relegation immunity for two seasons; while Namdhari, from a tier-3 city (Bhaini Ala), will be free from relegation for one season.

=== Rules ===
After the clubs requested to increase the maximum number of players allowed in a squad, the Committee decided to increase the player quota from 30 to 35. Clubs will also have to sign eight U-22 players.

=== Format ===
AIFF proposed to revamp the league format by dividing the 16 teams into two conferences or zones, similar to Major League Soccer, with the top 4 teams from each conference qualifying for the playoffs and the bottom four battling to avoid relegation, instead of traditional home-away format. The change was suggested to make the league cost-effective for clubs by reducing travel time. However, with only 13 teams left to participate in the league, the proposed changes were dropped in favor of the traditional home-away format.

== Teams ==
13 teams competed in this edition of the I-League; nine from the previous season, two promoted from the 2022–23 I-League 2, and two with direct entry. Five teams are set to play their home games out of their home state or city because of various reasons.

== Stadiums and locations ==
Locations of I-League teams

Team	State/UT	City	Stadium	Capacity
Aizawl	Mizoram	Aizawl	Rajiv Gandhi Stadium	20,000
Churchill Brothers	Goa	Vasco	Tilak Maidan	5,000
Delhi (Note: The club is based in Delhi but will play its home games in Punjab for the 2023–24 season due to the unavailability of stadiums in their home city.)	Delhi	New Delhi	Namdhari Stadium	1,000
Gokulam Kerala	Kerala	Kozhikode	EMS Stadium	50,000
Inter Kashi (Note: The club is based in Uttar Pradesh but has only played one of its home games at the Ekana Football Stadium so far.)	Uttar Pradesh	Varanasi	Ekana Football Stadium	5,000
Inter Kashi	Uttar Pradesh	Varanasi	Kalyani Stadium	20,000
Mohammedan	West Bengal	Kolkata	Naihati Stadium	20,000
Mohammedan	West Bengal	Kolkata	Vivekananda Yuba Bharati Krirangan	68,000
Namdhari	Punjab	Bhaini Sahib	Namdhari Stadium	1,000
NEROCA (Note: The club is based in Manipur but will play its home games in West Bengal due to the 2023 Manipur violence)	Manipur	Imphal	Kalyani Stadium	20,000
NEROCA	Manipur	Imphal	SSA Stadium	5,000
Rajasthan United (Note: The club is based in Rajasthan but will play its home games in various stadiums across India due to the unavailability of stadiums in their home city.)	Rajasthan	Jaipur	Deccan Arena	1,500
Rajasthan United	Rajasthan	Jaipur	Kalyani Stadium	20,000
Rajasthan United	Rajasthan	Jaipur	Namdhari Stadium	1,000
Real Kashmir	Jammu & Kashmir	Srinagar	TRC Turf Ground	11,000
Shillong Lajong	Meghalaya	Shillong	SSA Stadium	5,000
Sreenidi Deccan	Telangana	Hyderabad	Deccan Arena	1,500
TRAU	Manipur	Imphal	Kalyani Stadium	20,000

=== Personnel and sponsorship ===
Team	Head coach	Captain	Kit manufacturer	Shirt sponsor
Aizawl	(India) Malsawmzuala Sailo	(India) Lalmuanawma	(Philippines) Vamos	NECS Limited
Churchill Brothers	(Spain) Francesc Bonet	(Uruguay) Martín Cháves	(India) Trak-Only	Churchill Brothers
Delhi	(India) Yan Law	(India) Balwant Singh	(India) Nivia	Colordesign India
Gokulam Kerala	(India) Shareef Khan	(Spain) Álex Sánchez	(India) Do's	CSB Bank
Inter Kashi	(Spain) Carlos Santamarina	(India) Arindam Bhattacharya	(India) SIX5SIX	Cello
Mohammedan	(Russia) Andrey Chernyshov	(India) Samad Ali Mallick	(India) SIX5SIX	Opinion Edge
Namdhari	(India) Harpreet Singh	(India) Akashdeep Singh	(India) SPS Hospitals	Namdharis
NEROCA	(India) Gyan Moyon	(India) Sushil Meitei	(India) King	Wolf 777 News
Rajasthan United	(India) Pushpender Kundu	(India) Hardik Bhatt	(India) AIO Sports	AU Small Finance Bank
Real Kashmir	(India) Ishfaq Ahmed	(India) Muhammad Hammad	(India) Vector X	Football for Peace
Shillong Lajong	(India) Bobby Nongbet	(India) Kynsailang Khongsit	(India) King	Meghalaya Tourism
Sreenidi Deccan	(Portugal) Carlos Vaz Pinto	(Colombia) David Castañeda	(India) Vallion	Sreenidhi Sports Academy
TRAU	(India) L. Nandakumar Singh	(Saint Kitts and Nevis) Gerard Williams	(India) SIX5SIX	TLT Sports Academy

=== Managerial changes ===
Team	Outgoing manager	Manner of departure	Date of vacancy	Round	Table	Incoming manager	Date of appointment	Ref.
Gokulam Kerala	(Spain) Francesc Bonet	End of contract	31 May 2023	Pre-season		(Spain) Domingo Oramas	6 June 2023	
Delhi	(India) Surinder Singh	End of contract	31 May 2023	Pre-season		(India) Yan Law	25 June 2023	
Inter Kashi	Inaugural manager			Pre-season		(Spain) Carlos Santamarina	29 June 2023	
Churchill Brothers	(India) Mateus Costa	End of contract	31 May 2023	Pre-season		(Argentina) Edgardo Malvestiti	29 July 2023	
Mohammedan	(India) Mehrajuddin Wadoo	Sacked	22 August 2023	Pre-season		(Russia) Andrey Chernyshov	29 August 2023	
Aizawl	(India) Caetano Pinho	End of interim period	31 May 2023	Pre-season		(Netherlands) Erol Akbay	2 September 2023	
NEROCA	(India) Khogen Singh	End of contract	1 October 2023	Pre-season		(Malaysia) Jacob Joseph	8 October 2023	
Namdhari	(Serbia) Marko Djerkovic	End of contract	TBC	Pre-season		(Spain) Francesc Bonet	6 October 2023	
Real Kashmir	(England) Gifton Noel-Williams	End of contract	31 May 2023	Pre-season		(India) Ishfaq Ahmed	27 October 2023	
Aizawl	(Netherlands) Erol Akbay	Mutual Agreement	4 November 2023	2	10	(India) Malsawmzuala Sailo	4 November 2023	
Namdhari	(Spain) Francesc Bonet	Sacked	25 November 2023	6	10	(India) Harpreet Singh	25 November 2023	
Churchill Brothers	(Argentina) Edgardo Malvestiti	Sacked	6 January 2024	9	11	(Spain) Francesc Bonet	27 January 2024	
Aizawl	(India) Malsawmzuala Sailo	End of Interim Period	22 January 2024	4	11	(North Macedonia) Bobi Stojkoski	23 January 2024	
NEROCA	(Malaysia) Jacob Joseph	Sacked	9 February 2024	11	13	(India) Gyan Moyon	9 February 2024	
Aizawl	(North Macedonia) Bobi Stojkoski	Sacked	27 February 2024	15	8	(India) Malsawmzuala Sailo	27 February 2024	
Gokulam Kerala	(Spain) Domingo Oramas	Sacked	31 March 2024	22	5	(India) Shareef Khan	31 March 2024	

== Foreign players ==
Initially, the AIFF committee decided to reduce registered foreign players to five in the squad and three in the starting line-up and remove the mandatory Asian quota.

However, on 22nd August 2023, the AIFF decided to retain the number of foreigners a club can sign in the I-League. Like the 2022–23 season, clubs can register six foreign players in their matchday squad. However, they can field only four (one must be from an AFC Member Association) at any given point during a match.

Club	Player 1	Player 2	Player 3	Player 4	Player 5	Player 6	Former player(s)
Aizawl	(Brazil) Gustavo Silva	(Serbia) Ivan Marić	(Poland) Rafał Zaborowski	(Iran) Amir Memari			
Churchill Brothers	(Ivory Coast) Aubin Kouakou	(Nigeria) Chika Ajulu	(Nigeria) Ogana Louis	(Senegal) Abdou Karim Samb	(Uruguay) Martín Cháves	(Ghana) Kofi Essien	(Argentina) Ricardo Dichiara (Argentina) Emiliano Callegari (Iran) Meysam Shahmakvandzadeh
Delhi	(Brazil) Sérgio Barboza	(Brazil) Hudson Jesus	(Senegal) Pape Gassama	(Tajikistan) Alisher Kholmurodov	(Uzbekistan) Shokhrukhbek Muratov	(Japan) Takuto Miki	(Brazil) Aroldinho (Spain) Joseba Beitia (Egypt) Alaaeldin Nasr
Gokulam Kerala	(Cameroon) Aminou Bouba	(Spain) Álex Sánchez	(Spain) Pitu Viera	(Serbia) Matija Babovic	(Serbia) Nikola Stojanović	(Tajikistan) Komron Tursunov	(Nigeria) Justine Emmanuel (Spain) Nili Perdomo (Spain) Edu Bedia
Inter Kashi	(Cape Verde) Gianni dos Santos	(England) Peter Hartley	(Spain) Fran Gómez	(Spain) Jordan Lamela	(Spain) Julen Pérez	(Spain) Mario Barco	
Mohammedan	(Argentina) Alexis Gómez	(Argentina) Juan Nellar	(Ghana) Joseph Adjei	(Honduras) Eddie Hernández	(Russia) Evgeniy Kozlov	(Uzbekistan) Mirjalol Kasimov	(Ghana) Prince Opoku
Namdhari	(Spain) Imanol Arana	(Spain) Iván Garrido	(Ghana) Stephen Acquah				(Colombia) Olmes García
NEROCA	(Ivory Coast) Adama Coulibaly	(Ghana) Ibrahim Nurudeen	(Sierra Leone) David Simbo	(Liberia) Ansumana Kromah	(Lebanon) Haidar Awada		(Romania) Marius Leca (Romania) Bogdan Gavrila (Jamaica) Fabian Reid
Rajasthan United	(Brazil) Jefferson Oliveira	(Ghana) Ibrahim Moro	(Ghana) Richardson Denzell	(Ghana) Richard Gadze	(Croatia) Marin Mudražija		(Brazil) Paulo Vyctor (Brazil) Dário Júnior
Real Kashmir	(Ivory Coast) Kamo Bayi	(Ivory Coast) Gnohere Krizo	(Portugal) Carlos Lomba	(Ghana) Kamal Issah	(Uganda) Henry Kisekka	(Syria) Shaher Shaheen	(Lebanon) Mohamad Maksoud
Shillong Lajong	(Brazil) Daniel Gonçalves	(Brazil) Douglas Tardin	(Brazil) Renan Paulino	(Brazil) Marcos Rudwere	(Nepal) Arik Bista		(Japan) Takuto Miki (Senegal) Abdou Karim Samb
Sreenidi Deccan	(Brazil) Eli Sabiá	(Brazil) William Alves	(Colombia) David Castañeda	(Ivory Coast) Ibrahim Sissoko	(Nigeria) Rilwan Hassan	(Afghanistan) Faysal Shayesteh	
TRAU	(Saint Kitts and Nevis) Gerard Williams	(Ghana) Ben Quansah	(Uzbekistan) Sardor Jakhonov				(Brazil) Thawan Marcos (Brazil) Willian Reis (Ghana) Abraham Okyere (Senegal) Ibrahima Baldé

== League table ==
Pos	Team	Pld	W	D	L	GF	GA	GD	Pts	Qualification
1	Mohammedan (C, P)	24	15	7	2	44	22	+22	52	Promotion to Indian Super League
2	Sreenidi Deccan	24	14	6	4	54	26	+28	48	
3	Gokulam Kerala	24	12	6	6	55	34	+21	42	
4	Inter Kashi	24	11	8	5	47	41	+6	41	
5	Real Kashmir	24	11	7	6	36	19	+17	40	
6	Delhi	24	11	2	11	44	40	+4	35	
7	Churchill Brothers	24	9	6	9	40	31	+9	33	
8	Shillong Lajong	24	8	7	9	36	37	−1	31	
9	Namdhari	24	7	6	11	29	40	−11	27	
10	Aizawl	22	6	7	9	36	35	+1	25	
11	Rajasthan United	24	6	7	11	40	63	−23	25	
12	NEROCA (R)	23	4	2	17	26	61	−35	14	Relegation to I-League 2
13	TRAU (R)	23	4	1	18	26	64	−38	13	Relegation to I-League 2

Source: I-League
Rules for classification: 1) Points; 2) Head-to-head points; 3) Head-to-head goal difference; 4) Total goal difference; 5) Total number of goals scored; 6) drawing of lots
(Note: Head-to-head record is used only after all the matches between the teams in question have been played).
(C) Champions; (P) Promoted; (R) Relegated

== Results ==
Home \ Away	AIZ	CHB	DEL	GOK	IKA	MOH	NAM	NER	RAJ	REK	SHL	SRD	TRU
Aizawl	—	4–0	1–5	1–1	1–1	0–0	3–0	0–0 (Note: Match was abandoned citing security concerns.)	0–0	0–1	1–2	1–5	0–0
Churchill Brothers	2–0	—	2–0	1–2	1–2	0–0	1–1	4–1	7–0	0–2	2–1	1–2	4–0
Delhi	1–0	2–1	—	1–2	0–2	1–2	2–3	3–4	4–3	1–0	3–1	0–1	1–1
Gokulam Kerala	4–3	1–1	0–2	—	2–2	2–3	2–2	4–1	5–0	1–1	2–0	1–2	6–1
Inter Kashi	5–4	1–1	2–0	2–4	—	0–2	4–1	3–1	1–1	1–1	2–1	1–1	6–3
Mohammedan	2–1	3–2	1–3	1–1	1–1	—	3–1	2–1	5–1	0–3	1–1	2–1	6–0
Namdhari	1–1	0–0	1–2	2–1	2–4	0–1	—	3–2	2–0	1–0	1–1	0–2	1–2
NEROCA	1–3	2–3	1–2	0–3	1–3	0–2	2–1	—	3–4	0–4	0–2	1–1	1–0
Rajasthan United	2–2	2–0	3–6	1–4	2–2	1–2	0–0	5–1	—	1–0	1–1	1–2	5–4
Real Kashmir	0–0	1–3	1–1	3–0	4–0	0–0	1–4	3–0	2–0	—	3–1	0–0	1–0
Shillong Lajong	0–3	2–0	2–1	3–1	0–1	1–2	3–0	1–1	4–4	1–1	—	2–2	2–1
Sreenidi Deccan	1–2	2–2	1–0	1–4	4–1	1–1	2–0	4–0	6–1	2–3	3–2	—	3–0
TRAU	1–5	0–2	5–3	0–2	3–0	0–2	1–2	1–2	0–2	2–1	1–2	0–5	—

Source: I-League
Legend: Blue = home team win; Yellow = draw; Red = away team win.

=== Results by games ===
Team ╲ Round	1	2	3	4	5	6	7	8	9	10	11	12	13	14	15	16	17	18	19	20	21	22	23	24
Aizawl	L	W	W	L	W	D	D	W	W	D	D	D	L	L	D	L	L	L	L	W	D	L	D	D
Churchill Brothers	D	W	L	L	W	D	L	L	W	D	L	D	D	L	L	W	W	W	L	D	L	W	W	W
Delhi	D	W	L	W	L	L	W	W	L	L	W	L	W	L	W	L	L	L	L	D	W	W	W	W
Gokulam Kerala	D	W	W	W	L	D	D	D	L	D	W	W	W	W	W	W	L	L	D	W	L	L	W	W
Inter Kashi	D	L	W	W	L	L	W	D	L	W	D	W	L	D	W	D	W	D	W	W	W	W	D	D
Mohammedan	W	D	W	W	W	W	W	D	W	D	W	L	D	W	W	D	W	W	W	W	D	D	W	L
Namdhari	D	L	W	L	L	L	D	L	L	W	L	D	W	L	L	W	W	D	L	L	D	W	D	W
NEROCA	L	L	D	L	W	L	W	L	L	L	L	L	L	L	L	L	L	L	W	W	L	D	L	D
Rajasthan United	L	L	L	W	L	L	D	D	D	W	W	W	L	L	D	D	D	D	W	W	L	L	L	L
Real Kashmir	W	W	L	L	W	W	D	D	W	W	L	W	L	W	D	W	W	D	D	D	D	W	L	L
Shillong Lajong	D	D	D	W	W	W	D	W	L	L	W	L	L	W	W	D	L	W	D	D	L	L	L	L
Sreenidi Deccan	W	W	L	D	W	W	W	L	D	W	L	W	W	W	W	D	L	W	W	D	W	D	D	W
TRAU	D	L	L	L	L	L	L	L	W	L	L	W	L	L	L	L	W	L	L	L	L	W	D	L

Source: I-League
W = Win; D = Draw; L = Lose

== Charity match ==
The Mizoram Football Association in collaboration with Mizo Professional Footballers Association held a charity match on June 21. This match featured ISL vs I-League players from Mizoram to raise funds for Cyclone Remal victims.

21 June, 2024
17:00 IST

ISL XI (Mizo)	2-2	I-League XI (Mizo)
	Report

Rajiv Gandhi Stadium, Aizawl

== Season statistics ==
As of 13 April 2024

=== Top scorers ===
Rank	Player	Team	Goals
1	(Spain) Álex Sánchez	Gokulam Kerala	19
2	(Ghana) Richardson Denzell	Rajasthan United	16
3	(India) Lalrinzuala Lalbiaknia	Aizawl	15
4	(Honduras) Eddie Hernández	Mohammedan	13
4	(Brazil) Sérgio Barboza	Delhi	13
6	(Ivory Coast) Gnohere Krizo	Real Kashmir	12
6	(Spain) Mario Barco	Inter Kashi	12
8	(Colombia) David Castañeda	Sreenidi Deccan	11
9	(Brazil) William Alves	Sreenidi Deccan	9
10	(Nigeria) Ogana Louis	Churchill Brothers	7
10	(Senegal) Abdou Karim Samb	Shillong Lajong/Churchill Brothers	7

=== Hat-tricks ===
Player	For	Against	Result	Date	Ref
(India) Yash Tripathi	Rajasthan United	Delhi	3–4 (A)	2 November 2023	
(Spain) Álex Sánchez	Gokulam Kerala	Rajasthan United	5–0 (H)	9 November 2023	
(India) Lalrinzuala Lalbiaknia	Aizawl	NEROCA	3–1 (A)	14 November 2023	
(Ghana) Richardson Denzell	Rajasthan United	TRAU	5-4 (H)	22 December 2023	
(Honduras) Eddie Hernández	Mohammedan	Rajasthan United	5-1 (H)	13 February 2024	
(Senegal) Abdou Karim Samb	Churchill Brothers	NEROCA	3–2 (A)	8 March 2024	
(Croatia) Marin Mudrazija	Rajasthan United	NEROCA	5–1 (H)	11 March 2024	
(Brazil) Sérgio Barboza	Delhi	Shillong Lajong	3–1 (H)	28 March 2024	

=== Top assists ===
Rank	Player	Team	Assists
1	(Spain) Mario Barco	Inter Kashi	12
2	(India) Edmund Lalrindika	Inter Kashi	8
2	(India) Noufal PN	Gokulam Kerala	8
4	(Afghanistan) Faysal Shayesteh	Sreenidi Deccan	7
5	(Spain) Imanol Arana	Namdhari	6
5	(Argentina) Alexis Gómez	Mohammedan	6
5	(Uruguay) Martín Cháves	Churchill Brothers	6
8	(India) Lalchungnunga Chhangte	Rajasthan United	5
8	(India) Hardy Nongbri	Shillong Lajong	5
8	(Spain) Álex Sánchez	Gokulam Kerala	5
8	(India) Deepak Singh	TRAU	5
8	(Senegal) Pape Gassama	Delhi	5
8	(India) Lalremruata Ralte	Churchill Brothers	5

=== Clean sheets ===
Rank	Player	Team	Clean sheets
1	(India) Muheet Shabir	Real Kashmir	12
2	(India) Padam Chettri	Mohammedan	8
3	(India) Albino Gomes	Sreenidi Deccan	7
3	(India) Subhasish Roy Chowdhury	Churchill Brothers	7
5	(India) Nora Fernandes	Aizawl	5
6	(India) Avilash Paul (Note: Paul was substituted after 65 minutes against TRAU after Dabas' red card)	Gokulam Kerala	3
6	(India) Sachin Jha	Rajashthan United	3
6	(India) Naveen Kumar	Delhi	3
6	(India) Devansh Dabas	Gokulam Kerala	3
10	(India) Tenzin Samdup	Namdhari	2
10	(India) Neithovilie Chalieu	Shillong Lajong	2
10	(India) Arindam Bhattacharya	Inter Kashi	2
10	(India) Bhabindra Malla Thakuri	Rajashthan United	2
10	(India) Nishan Singh	Namdhari	2

== Attendances ==
=== Overall ===
Pos	Team	Total	High	Low	Average	Change
1	Shillong Lajong	75,803	7,816	4,891	6,316	+255.8%^{†}
2	Gokulam Kerala	61,349	19,764	600	5,112	+99.8%
3	Mohammedan	52,368	24,678	200	4,758	+199.2%
4	Real Kashmir	38,492	7,632	1,100	3,499	+22.4%
5	Aizawl	18,199	3,485	300	1,819	−22.0%
6	Churchill Brothers	13,881	2,314	500	1,156	−36.2%
7	Delhi	6,976	1,182	150	581	+239.8%^{†}
8	Inter Kashi	6,294	2,687	123	524	n/a^{*}
9	Namdhari	6,147	1,200	300	512	n/a^{*}
10	Sreenidi Deccan	4,906	900	80	408	−21.5%
11	NEROCA	4,282	2,500	50	362	−89.4%
12	TRAU	3,061	512	100	255	−88.2%
13	Rajasthan United	2,204	500	86	183	−86.6%
	League total	293,962	24,678	50	1,933	+6.3%

Source: I-League
Notes:
^{†} Teams played previous season in I-League 2.
^{*} Teams that joined I-League through corporate direct entry.

==== Attendances by home matches ====
Team \ Match played	1	2	3	4	5	6	7	8	9	10	11	12	Total
Shillong Lajong	5,585	5,248	5,987	6,425	6,718	6,115	7,438	4,891	5,812	6,617	7,151	7,816	75,803
Gokulam Kerala	19,764	10,485	4,388	13,425	2,000	2,500	2,500	2,023	1,540	1,024	1,100	600	61,349
Mohammedan	4,900	3,786	1,773	5,825	3,885	1,821	2,500	N/A (Note: Mohammedan's home match against Rajasthan United was played behind closed doors due to report of violence in Mohammedan's previous game.)	200	1,000	2,000	24,678	52,368
Real Kashmir	1,872	6,200	4,728	3,172	3,659	2,500	N/A (Note: Real Kashmir's home match against Gokulam Kerala was played behind closed doors due to security concerns.)	3,740	1,635	7,632	2,254	1,100	38,492
Aizawl	767	2,000	3,004	3,485	2,879	1,000	1,462	1,246	2,056	300	N/A (Note: Matches were abandoned due to security concerns and the points were shared)	N/A	18,199
Churchill Brothers	2,314	1,895	2,000	1,683	500	1,633	825	1,025	981	200	275	550	13,881
Delhi	600	618	1,100	1,182	1,058	918	150	200	500	250	200	200	6,976
Inter Kashi	2,687	500	123	259	127	447	187	200	752	325	232	455	6,294
Namdhari	561	350	300	898	1,200	488	300	500	500	250	400	400	6,147
Sreenidi Deccan	750	696	900	650	750	123	80	200	168	250	149	190	4,906
NEROCA	200	212	153	258	259	2,500	100	50	150	100	200	100	4,282
TRAU	200	315	100	128	422	128	512	259	222	152	500	123	3,061
Rajasthan United	150	200	88	280	88	86	312	100	100	500	100	200	2,204

Legend: Highest Lowest
Updated to game(s) played on 13 April 2024
Source: I-League

== Awards ==
Álex Sánchez (Gokulam Kerala) has won the Hero of the match award the most times (7).

Hero of the match
Match no.	Player	Team	Match no.	Player	Team	Match no.	Player	Team
1	(India) Wayne Vaz	Real Kashmir	2	(Spain) Álex Sánchez	Gokulam Kerala	3	(Colombia) David Castañeda	Sreenidi Deccan
4	(Argentina) Alexis Gómez	Mohammedan	5	(India) Balwant Singh	Delhi	6	(Uruguay) Martín Cháves	Churchill Brothers
7	(India) Yash Tripathi	Rajasthan United	8	(India) Rosenberg Gabriel	Sreenidi Deccan	9	(Brazil) Daniel Gonçalves	Shillong Lajong
10	(India) Jeremy Laldinpuia	Real Kashmir	11	(Spain) Álex Sánchez (2)	Gokulam Kerala	12	(Spain) Mario Barco	Inter Kashi
13	(India) Tharpuia	Aizawl	14	(Ghana) Joseph Adjei	Mohammedan	15	(Argentina) Ricardo Dichiara	Churchill Brothers
16	(Brazil) Renan Paulino	Shillong Lajong	17	(Spain) Álex Sánchez (3)	Gokulam Kerala	18	(India) Padam Chettri	Mohammedan
19	(India) Akashdeep Singh	Namdhari	20	(Spain) Álex Sánchez (4)	Gokulam Kerala	21	(Ghana) Richardson Denzell	Rajasthan United
22	(India) Rosenberg Gabriel (2)	Sreenidi Deccan	23	(India) Lalrinzuala Lalbiaknia	Aizawl	24	(India) Gaurav Rawat	Delhi
25	(India) Gyamar Nikum	Inter Kashi	26	(Spain) Imanol Arana	Namdhari	27	(India) Sagolsem Bikash Singh	Mohammedan
28	(India) Hardy Nongbri	Shillong Lajong	29	(India) Jagdeep Singh	Sreenidi Deccan	30	(India) Wahengbam Angousana	Mohammedan
31	(India) Lalrinzuala Lalbiaknia (2)	Aizawl	32	(India) Phrangki Buam	Shillong Lajong	33	(Argentina) Ricardo Dichiara (2)	Churchill Brothers
34	(India) Muhammad Hammad	Real Kashmir	35	(Brazil) Eli Sabiá	Sreenidi Deccan	36	(India) Hardy Nongbri (2)	Shillong Lajong
37	(India) Jagdeep Singh (2)	Sreenidi Deccan	38	(Argentina) Emiliano Callegari Torre	Churchill Brothers	39	(Sierra Leone) David Simbo	NEROCA
40	(India) Mohammad Inam	Real Kashmir	41	(India) Lalrinzuala Lalbiaknia (3)	Aizawl	42	(Senegal) Pape Gassama	Delhi
43	(Spain) Jordan Lamela	Inter Kashi	44	(India) Nora Fernandes	Aizawl	45	(India) Abhijith Kurungodan	Gokulam Kerala
46	(Ghana) Ibrahim Moro	Rajasthan United	47	(Honduras) Eddie Hernández	Mohammedan	48	(India) Bali Gagandeep	Delhi
49	(Brazil) Renan Paulino (2)	Shillong Lajong	50	(Ghana) Richard Gadze	Rajasthan United	51	(India) R Lalbiakliana	Sreenidi Deccan
52	(India) Joe Zoherliana	Aizawl	53	(Uzbekistan) Mirjalol Kasimov	Mohammedan	54	(Serbia) Ivan Marić	Aizawl
55	(India) Danish Aribam	TRAU	56	(India) Faisal Ali	Churchill Brothers	57	(Portugal) Carlos Lomba	Real Kashmir
58	(Brazil) Eli Sabiá (2)	Sreenidi Deccan	59	(Uzbekistan) Mirjalol Kasimov (2)	Mohammedan	60	(Spain) Jordan Lamela (2)	Inter Kashi
61	(Ghana) Richardson Denzell (2)	Rajasthan United	62	(India) Mohammad Inam (2)	Real Kashmir	63	(Spain) Álex Sánchez (5)	Gokulam Kerala
64	(India) Manvir Singh	Namdhari	65	(India) Padam Chettri (2)	Mohammedan	66	(Spain) Álex Sánchez (6)	Gokulam Kerala
67	(India) Nora Fernandes (2)	Aizawl	68	(Ghana) Richardson Denzell (3)	Rajasthan United	69	(Brazil) Renan Paulino (3)	Shillong Lajong
70	(Brazil) Hudson Jesus	Delhi	71	(India) Lalremsanga Fanai	Mohammedan	72	(Cape Verde) Gianni dos Santos	Inter Kashi
73	(Brazil) Eli Sabiá (3)	Sreenidi Deccan	74	No one was given due to the cancellation of the match		75	(Croatia) Marin Mudražija	Rajasthan United
76	(Serbia) Nikola Stojanović	Gokulam Kerala	77	(Uruguay) Martín Cháves (2)	Churchill Brothers	78	(India) Nora Fernandes (3)	Aizawl
79	(India) Danish Aribam (2)	TRAU	80	(India) Sourav K	Gokulam Kerala	81	(Honduras) Eddie Hernández (2)	Mohammedan
82	(India) Akashdeep Singh (2)	Namdhari	83	(Colombia) David Castañeda (2)	Sreenidi Deccan	84	(India) Muhammad Ajsal	Inter Kashi
85	(Brazil) Sérgio Barboza	Delhi	86	(Tajikistan) Komron Tursunov	Gokulam Kerala	87	(Honduras) Eddie Hernández (3)	Mohammedan
88	(India) Kynsaibor Lhuid	Shillong Lajong	89	(India) Gyamar Nikum (2)	Inter Kashi	90	(Ivory Coast) Gnohere Krizo	Real Kashmir
91	(India) Lalliansanga Renthlei	Gokulam Kerala	92	(Colombia) David Castañeda (3)	Sreenidi Deccan	93	(Uzbekistan) Shokhrukhbek Muratov	Delhi
94	(India) Lalbiakzuala	Rajasthan United	95	(India) Mohammad Inam (3)	Real Kashmir	96	(India) Abhijith Kurungodan (2)	Gokulam Kerala
97	(Nigeria) Rilwan Hassan	Sreenidi Deccan	98	(India) Manash Protim Gogoi	TRAU	99	(India) Edmund Lalrindika	Inter Kashi
100	(Nigeria) Ogana Louis	Churchill Brothers	101	(Uganda) Henry Kisekka	Real Kashmir	102	(Brazil) Daniel Gonçalves (2)	Shillong Lajong
103	(Spain) Iván Garrido	Namdhari	104	(Colombia) David Castañeda (4)	Sreenidi Deccan	105	(India) Lalchungnunga Chhangte	Rajasthan United
106	(India) Akashdeep Singh (3)	Namdhari	107	(India) David Lalhlansanga	Mohammedan	108	(Ivory Coast) Gnohere Krizo (2)	Real Kashmir
109	No one was given due to the cancellation of the match		110	(Ghana) Richardson Denzell (4)	Rajasthan United	111	(Senegal) Abdou Karim Samb	Churchill Brothers
112	(India) Muhammad Ajsal (2)	Inter Kashi	113	(India) Phrangki Buam (2)	Shillong Lajong	114	(India) Sagolsem Bikash Singh (2)	Mohammedan
115	(India) Lalromawia	Sreenidi Deccan	116	(Serbia) Matija Babović	Gokulam Kerala	117	(Croatia) Marin Mudražija (2)	Rajasthan United
118	(India) Pritam Kumar Singh	TRAU	119	(Honduras) Eddie Hernández (4)	Mohammedan	120	(England) Peter Hartley	Inter Kashi
121	(India) Adnan Ayub	Real Kashmir	122	(Serbia) Matija Babović (2)	Gokulam Kerala	123	(Ghana) Richardson Denzell (5)	Rajasthan United
124	(India) Harpreet Singh	Namdhari	125	(India) Gurtej Singh	Delhi	126	(Honduras) Eddie Hernández (5)	Mohammedan
127	(Brazil) William Alves	Sreenidi Deccan	128	(Spain) Mario Barco (2)	Inter Kashi	129	(Liberia) Ansumana Kromah	NEROCA
130	(India) Peter Seiminthang Haokip	Namdhari	131	(India) Arindam Bhattacharya	Inter Kashi	132	(India) Muhammad Hammad (2)	Real Kashmir
133	(Brazil) Sérgio Barboza (2)	Delhi	134	(India) Stendly Fernandes	Churchill Brothers	135	(India) Lourembam David Singh	NEROCA
136	(Brazil) Sérgio Barboza (3)	Delhi	137	(India) Lalrinzuala Lalbiaknia (4)	Aizawl	138	(India) Hyder Yousuf	Real Kashmir
139	(Spain) Mario Barco (3)	Inter Kashi	140	(India) Lalromawia (2)	Sreenidi Deccan	141	(India) Peter Seiminthang Haokip (2)	Namdhari
142	(Uruguay) Martín Cháves (3)	Churchill Brothers	143	(India) Khoirom Jackson Singh	NEROCA	144	(Brazil) Hudson Jesus (2)	Delhi
145	(Nigeria) Ogana Louis (2)	Churchill Brothers	146	(India) Soraisam Robinson Singh	TRAU	147	(India) Padam Chettri (3)	Mohammedan
148	(Spain) Álex Sánchez (7)	Gokulam Kerala	149	(Spain) Julen Pérez	Inter Kashi	150	(Nigeria) Ogana Louis (3)	Churchill Brothers
151	(India) Noufal PN	Gokulam Kerala	152	(Ghana) Stephen Acquah	Namdhari	153	(India) Mayakkannan	Sreenidi Deccan
154	(Uzbekistan) Shokhrukhbek Muratov	Delhi						

=== Annual awards ===
Award	Winner
Best Player	(Spain) Álex Sánchez (Gokulam Kerala)
Best Goalkeeper	(India) Padam Chettri (Mohammedan)
Jarnail Singh Award (Best Defender)	(India) Muhammad Hammad (Real Kashmir)
Best Midfielder	(Uzbekistan) Mirjalol Kasimov (Mohammedan)
Highest Scorer	(Spain) Álex Sánchez (Gokulam Kerala)
Best Emerging Player	(India) Gyamar Nikum (Inter Kashi)
Syed Abdul Rahim Award (Best Coach)	(Russia) Andrey Chernyshov (Mohammedan)
Fair Play Contest	TRAU
Best Match Organisation	Mohammedan
Best Media Operations	Rajasthan United
Source: I-League

== See also ==
- Men
  - 2023–24 Indian Super League (Tier I)
  - 2023–24 I-League 2 (Tier III)
  - 2023–24 I-League 3 (Tier IV)
  - 2023–24 Indian State Leagues (Tier V)
  - 2024 Super Cup
  - 2023 Durand Cup
  - 2024 Reliance Foundation Development League
- Women
  - 2023–24 Indian Women's League
  - 2023–24 Indian Women's League 2
