= Almuqeet FC =

Indian association football club

- Full name: Almuqeet Football Club
- Founded: 2026; 0 years ago
- League: J&K Premier League

Almuqeet Football Club is an Indian professional football club based in Srinagar, Jammu and Kashmir. The club competes in the J&K Premier League, which is top tier football league in Jammu and Kashmir.

== History ==
Almuqeet FC was founded in 2026 and is affiliated with the All India Football Federation,Jammu and Kashmir Football Association.The club participates in various state and regional tournaments.

== See also ==
- Downtown Heroes FC
- Real Kashmir FC
- J&K Bank Football Club
- Kashmir Avengers FC
