= 2021 JKFA Professional League =

1st season of JKFA Professional League

JKFA Professional League
- Season: 2021
- Dates: 12 – 31 July
- Champions: J&K Bank FC (1st title)
- Top goalscorer: Aakif (8 goals); J&K Bank Football Club
- Highest scoring: Shaheen FC 5–3 SCFA
- Longest winning run: 6 matches J&K Bank Football Club
- Longest unbeaten run: 7 matches J&K Bank Football Club
- Longest winless run: 7 matches SCFA
- Longest losing run: 5 matches SCFA

The JKFA Professional League 2021 is the inaugural season of the JKFA Professional League, the first professional league in the Indian state of Jammu and Kashmir. It is organised by Jammu and Kashmir Football Association and J&K Sports Council.

The inaugural season kicked off on July 12, with 8 teams competing for the maiden title and qualification for the I-League 2nd Division. The 8 teams will play once against each other in a round-robin format. The Top 2 clubs will be nominated for I-League 2nd Division.

== Teams ==
A total of 8 teams participated in the league.

Club	City/Town	Head Coach	Kit sponsors
Downtown Heroes FC	Downtown Srinagar	Idris Lone	
Hyderya Sports FC	Srinagar	Zahoor Ahmed Teli	Fast Beetle
J&K Bank FC	Srinagar		None
J&K Sports Council Football Academy (SCFA)	Srinagar	Mehrajuddin Wadoo	None
Kashmir Avengers FC	Srinagar	Sheikh Rizwan	Aqua Group
Lonestar Kashmir FC	Srinagar		None
Real Kashmir FC Reserves	Srinagar		
Shaheen FC	Jammu		

=== Foreign Players ===
Team	Player 1	Player 2	Asian Visa
Downtown Heroes FC	(Ghana) Kwesi Sessy		-
Hyderya Sports FC	(Ivory Coast) Dechanel Gnoanrou		-
J&K Bank FC	-	-	-
J&K Sports Council Football Academy (SCFA)	-	-	-
Kashmir Avengers FC	(Liberia) Kelvin Kollie		-
Lonestar Kashmir FC	(Panama) Rogelio Juarez	-	-
Real Kashmir FC Reserves	-	-	-
Shaheen FC	(Cameroon) Mac Donald		-

== Standings ==
	Team	Pld	W	D	L	GF	GA	GD	Pts	
1	J&K Bank	7	6	1	0	16	3	+10	19	Champions and Qualification to I-League 2nd Division (provisionally)
2	Hyderya Sports FC	7	4	1	2	13	9	+8	13	
3	Downtown Heroes FC	7	3	2	2	7	4	+3	11	
4	Real Kashmir FC reserves	7	3	1	3	14	9	+5	10	
5	Kashmir Avengers FC	7	3	1	3	12	8	+4	10	
6	Lonestar Kashmir FC	7	3	1	3	10	9	+1	10	
7	Shaheen FC	7	2	0	5	8	16	-8	6	
8	SCFA	7	0	1	6	5	27	-22	1	
