= Hyderya Sports FC =

Indian professional football club

Hyderya Sports
- Full name: Hyderya Kashmir Football Club
- Nickname: The Mountain Lions
- Founded: 2006; 20 years ago
- Ground: TRC Turf Ground
- Capacity: 11,000
- Head coach: Zahoor Ahmed Teli
- League: JKFA Professional League

Hyderya Sports Football Club, also known as Hyderya Kashmir Football Club (HKFC), is an Indian professional football club based in Srinagar, Jammu and Kashmir. The club competes in the JKFA Professional League, and was nominated for the I-League Qualifiers. Nicknamed as The Mountain Lions, Hyderya was to be the third club from Jammu and Kashmir to participate in qualifiers.

== History ==
Hyderya FC participated in the first ever JKFA Professional League, where they finished runners up, earning qualification spot for 2021 I-League Qualifiers. On 27 September 2021, the All India Football Federation disqualified Hyderya from the I-League Qualifiers, for producing a bank guarantee which was "not genuine".

== Honours ==
=== Domestic league ===
- JKFA Professional League
  - Runners-up (1): 2021

== See also ==
- List of football clubs in Jammu & Kashmir
