= Kashmir Super League =

Football league in India

- Organising body: Fucan Sports Pvt Ltd
- Founded: 2025
- Country: India
- Number of clubs: 6
- Current champions: Aqua Kashmir Avengers (1st title) (2026)
- Broadcaster(s): KSL (YouTube)
- Website: kashmirsuperleague.org
- Current: 2026

Kashmir Super League (KSL), also known as Khyber Cement Kashmir Super League due to sponsorship reasons, is a franchise-based professional football league of Kashmir division held in Jammu and Kashmir, India. It is the first corporate-owned, auction‑based football competition in the region . It was launched in 2025 to promote and provide a professional platform for players in the region.

The inaugural season was won by United Elegant FC who defeated Kashmir Avengers FC in a penalty shootout.

== History ==
The league was officially launched on 8 July 2025 by Sports Minister Satish Sharma along with other dignitaries. The trophy and team jerseys were unveiled at the ceremony.

== Format ==
The league features six teams competing in a round-robin format followed by playoffs. All matches are held at the TRC Turf Ground in Srinagar.

The league also adopts the Nivia ISL‑standard match ball, aligning it with national-level football protocols.

== Sponsorship ==
The league is primarily sponsored by Khyber Cement and powered by Athwas Hyundai. It is managed by Fucan Sports Pvt Ltd.

== Teams ==
- Swift Strikers
- Athwas India XI
- New JK United FC
- Arco United FC
- Aqua Kashmir Avengers FC
- United Elegant FC

== Champions ==
Season	League Winners	Champions	Runners-up	Ref
2025	United Elegant FC	United Elegant FC	Kashmir Avengers	
2026	Athwas India XI	Kashmir Avengers	Athwas India XI	

== See also ==
- Kashmir Champions League
- Football in India
- Jammu and Kashmir Football Association
- TRC Turf Ground
