= J&K Bank Football Club =

Indian association football club

J&K Bank FC
- Full name: Jammu & Kashmir Bank Football Club
- Founded: 1984; 42 years ago
- Ground: TRC Turf Ground, Srinagar
- Capacity: 11,000
- Owner: Jammu & Kashmir Bank
- League: J&K Premier Football League; JKFA Professional League

Jammu & Kashmir Bank Football Club (simply known as J&K Bank FC or J&K Bank XI) is an Indian professional football club based in Jammu and Kashmir, that competes in the JKFA Professional League. It is an institutional club as they are owned by Jammu & Kashmir Bank and was founded in 1984. The U-18 team played in Elite League. The senior team also participated in the first edition of Real Kashmir Cup.

== History ==
=== Foundation ===
The J&K Bank Football Team was founded in 1984. Since that time they took part in several football tournaments. In 2007 the team won the north zone of National Football League Third Division and got promoted to National Football League Second Division.

=== Foundation of J&K Bank Football Academy ===
J&K Bank Football Club was formed as an initiative to nurture and expand the success story of J&K Bank Football Academy, which began its journey in 2011. The young players were identified, chosen, picked up and trained by the J&K Bank Academy to become the football players they are at present in top clubs of Indian football league system.

In the very first year of establishment in 2011, the academy team won B-division state league and qualified for the A-division. Then in the next season, they lifted A-division trophy to achieve their spot in state super division.

The latest success achieved by the academy team is winning the Christmas Gold Cup in 2020 at the Govt. Gandhi Memorial Science College ground in Jammu.

=== As professional club ===
As J&K Bank FC, they began their journey through participating in JKFA Professional League in the 2020–21 season.

In April 2021, J&K Bank as a professional club, achieved success in the 28th annual J&K Football Championship, delivering title winning performance against rivals Real Kashmir Reserves at the TRC Turf Ground.

Success in football, like banking business, is more a product of efficient coordination within the team, optimum utilization of the resources and determination to stay ahead of others through a mix of well-thought strategy and timely use of opportunities. Therefore, as members of the premiere financial institution of the UT, we need to keep focus whether we are on the field or off it.

— R K Chhibber, Chairman and MD of J&K Bank FC, felicitating the team after their 28th Annual Football Championship win.

In 2021, the team participated in the inaugural season of JKFA Professional League, the first professional league in the Indian state of Jammu and Kashmir, organised by Jammu and Kashmir Football Association (JKFA) and J&K Sports Council.

== Notable players ==
- (Liberia) Philip Tarlue
- (India) Danish Farooq Bhat
- (India) Farhan Ganie

== Managerial history ==
- (India) Manzoor Ahmad (2019–2020)
- (India) Hilal Rasool (2020–present)

== Honours ==
=== Domestic league ===
- National Football League III (North Zone)
  - Champions (1): 2006–07
- J&K Premier Football League
  - Champions (3): 2017, 2020, 2021
- JKFA Professional League
  - Champions (1): 2021
- JK Bank & Khyber Premier League
  - Champions (1): 2015

=== Domestic cups ===
- J&K Football Championship Trophy
  - Champions (3): 2017 (as J&K Bank Academy), 2020, 2021
- G.V. Raja Football Tournament
  - Champions (1): 2010
- J&K Police Martyrs Memorial Cup
  - Champions (1): 2017
- Christmas Gold Cup
  - Champions (4): 2018, 2020, 2021, 2023
- Delhi Lt. Governor's Cup
  - Champions (1): 2007–08
  - Runners-up (1): 2005
- Positive Kashmir Football Championship
  - Champions (2): 2021, 2022
- All India Super Sports Society Football Cup
  - Champions (1): 2016
- Ladakh Climate Cup
  - Runners-up (1): 2024

== See also ==
- List of football clubs in India
- Sports in Jammu and Kashmir
- Almuqeet FC
