= 2007–08 Santosh Trophy =

2008 Santosh Trophy
Tournament details
- Country: India
- Teams: 31

Final positions
- Champions: Punjab (8th title)
- Runners-up: Services

The 62nd Santosh Trophy was held from 25 May to 15 June 2008 in Srinagar, Jammu & Kashmir.

== Qualifying rounds ==
Venues:

- Gandhi Memorial Science College Ground, Jammu
- Bakshi Stadium, Srinagar
- Polo Ground, Srinagar

=== Group I - Jammu ===
Team	Pld	W	D	L	GF	GA	GD	Pts
Tamil Nadu	3	2	1	0	8	3	+5	7
Sikkim	3	2	0	1	9	6	+3	6
Chandigarh	3	1	0	2	2	5	−3	3
Bihar	3	0	1	2	3	8	−5	1

26 May 2008

Tamil Nadu	4 – 1	Sikkim

Gandhi Memorial Science College Ground, Jammu

26 May 2008

Bihar	0–1	Chandigarh
		Thapa 25'

Gandhi Memorial Science College Ground, Jammu

28 May 2008

Chandigarh	0 – 2	Tamil Nadu
		CS Sabeeth 39', 68'

Gandhi Memorial Science College Ground, Jammu

28 May 2008

Sikkim	5 – 1	Bihar

Gandhi Memorial Science College Ground, Jammu

30 May 2008

Chandigarh	1 - 3	Sikkim
Thapa 13' (corner)		Jairu 19', 90+1'; C Subha 84'

Gandhi Memorial Science College Ground, Jammu

30 May 2008

Tamil Nadu	2–2	Bihar

Gandhi Memorial Science College Ground, Jammu

=== Group II - Jammu ===
Team	Pld	W	D	L	GF	GA	GD	Pts
Services	3	1	2	0	11	3	+8	5
Manipur	3	1	2	0	9	4	+5	5
Orissa	3	0	2	1	5	10	−5	2
Nagaland	3	0	2	1	2	10	−8	2

27 May 2008

Services	8–0	Nagaland
D'Silva 20', 70'; Raleng 24'; Gordon Z. 45'; LB Victor 63', 71', 81'; Mishra 79'

Gandhi Memorial Science College Ground, Jammu

27 May 2008

Manipur	7–2	Orissa

Gandhi Memorial Science College Ground, Jammu

29 May 2008

Orissa	1–1	Services
Samal 34'		Raleng 33'

Gandhi Memorial Science College Ground, Jammu

29 May 2008

Nagaland	0–0	Manipur

Gandhi Memorial Science College Ground, Jammu

31 May 2008

Orissa	2–2	Nagaland
Samal 51', 90'		Peseyie 69', 77'

Gandhi Memorial Science College Ground, Jammu
31 May 2008

Manipur	0–1	Services
B Singh 40'		J Singh 43'

Gandhi Memorial Science College Ground, Jammu

=== Group III - Srinagar ===
Team	Pld	W	D	L	GF	GA	GD	Pts
Delhi	2	1	1	0	2	0	+2	4
Tripura	2	1	0	1	5	2	+3	3
Gujarat	2	0	1	1	0	5	−5	1

26 May 2008

Delhi	0–0	Gujarat

Bakshi Stadium, Srinagar

29 May 2008

Gujarat	0–5	Tripura
		Chetri; BK Jamatia

Bakshi Stadium, Srinagar

30 May 2008

Tripura	0–2	Delhi
	Report	Rawat 10'; G. Kamesh 33'

Bakshi Stadium, Srinagar

=== Group IV - Srinagar ===
Team	Pld	W	D	L	GF	GA	GD	Pts
Jammu and Kashmir	3	3	0	0	14	0	+14	9
Himachal Pradesh	3	2	0	1	7	12	−5	6
Daman and Diu	3	1	0	2	4	9	−5	3
Pondicherry	3	0	0	3	3	7	−4	0

25 May 2008

Jammu and Kashmir	2-0	Pondicherry
Qadir 25'; Wani 35'

Bakshi Stadium, Srinagar

26 May 2008

Daman and Diu	2–4	Himachal Pradesh
Noel 63'; Pereira 81'		Y Sharma 34', 43'; Kumar 53'; Rana 73'

Bakshi Stadium, Srinagar

27 May 2008

Pondicherry	2–3	Himachal Pradesh
Selvan 76'; Karunanidhi 81'		V Sharma 70'; Rana 87', 90+3'

Bakshi Stadium, Srinagar

27 May 2008

Daman and Diu	0–4	Jammu and Kashmir
		Wani 44'; T Ahmed 46'; Z Ahmed 50'; Rizwan 60'

Bakshi Stadium, Srinagar

29 May 2008

Jammu and Kashmir	8–0	Himachal Pradesh
I Ahmed 12', 40', 49', 52'; B Ahmed 22'; Feroz 29'; Iqbal 33'; T Ahmed 69'

Bakshi Stadium, Srinagar

29 May 2008

Pondicherry	1–2	Daman and Diu
Selvan 5'		Pereira 25', 46'

Bakshi Stadium, Srinagar

=== Group V - Srinagar ===
Team	Pld	W	D	L	GF	GA	GD	Pts
Karnataka	2	2	0	0	5	1	+4	6
Jharkhand	2	1	0	1	4	4	0	3
Uttar Pradesh	2	0	0	2	2	6	−4	0

26 May 2008

Karnataka	2–1	Jharkhand
Vijay Kumar 11', 86'	Report	Hasda 77'

Bakshi Stadium, Srinagar

28 May 2008

Jharkhand	3–2	Uttar Pradesh

Bakshi Stadium, Srinagar

30 May 2008

Uttar Pradesh	0–3	Karnataka
	Report	Prasad 30', 53'; C. Pradeep 40'

Bakshi Stadium, Srinagar

=== Group VI - Srinagar ===
Team	Pld	W	D	L	GF	GA	GD	Pts
Haryana	2	1	1	0	3	1	+2	4
Madhya Pradesh	2	0	2	0	0	0	0	2
Assam	2	0	1	1	1	3	−2	1

26 May 2008

Haryana	0–0	Madhya Pradesh

Bakshi Stadium, Srinagar

28 May 2008

Madhya Pradesh	0–1	Assam

Bakshi Stadium, Srinagar

30 May 2008

Assam	1–3	Haryana
Rongmoi 5'		L. Thoiba Singh 40', 89'; J Singh 74'

Bakshi Stadium, Srinagar

=== Group VII - Srinagar ===
Team	Pld	W	D	L	GF	GA	GD	Pts
Railways	2	1	1	0	4	1	+3	4
Mizoram	2	1	1	0	3	2	+1	4
Chhattisgarh	2	0	0	2	1	5	−4	0

26 May 2008

Chhattisgarh	1–2	Mizoram
	Report	Mahlima 35'; Malsaw 87'

Bakshi Stadium, Srinagar

28 May 2008

Mizoram	1–1	Railways

Bakshi Stadium, Srinagar

30 May 2008

Railways	3–0	Chhattisgarh
Sura 14', 22'		Kumar 51'

Bakshi Stadium, Srinagar

=== Group VIII - Srinagar ===
Team	Pld	W	D	L	GF	GA	GD	Pts
Goa	2	2	0	0	5	2	+3	6
Meghalaya	2	1	0	1	4	3	+1	3
Uttarakhand	2	0	0	2	2	6	−4	0

27 May 2008

Meghalaya	3–1	Uttarakhand
Raj 3', 43'; Suting 74'		Kumar 78'

Bakshi Stadium, Srinagar

29 May 2008

Uttarakhand	1–3	Goa
		Borges 15'; Antao 58'; Abranches 90'

Bakshi Stadium, Srinagar

31 May 2008

Goa	2–1	Meghalaya
Desai 10'; Fernandes 64'		Suting 21'

Bakshi Stadium, Srinagar

== Pre-quarterfinal playoffs ==
1 June 2008

Jammu and Kashmir	0–4	Delhi
I. Ahmed 11', 86'; Asif 35'; Rizwan 88'	Report

Bakshi Stadium, Srinagar
Attendance: 5,000

2 June 2008

Tamil Nadu	0–5	Services
		D'Silva 14', 51', 54'; S. Raling 81'; Rai 86'

Bakshi Stadium, Srinagar

2 June 2008

Karnataka	2–1	Haryana
Nabeel 7'; Prasad 71'		Sa. Singh 23'

Bakshi Stadium, Srinagar

31 May 2008

Goa	0–0 (4-3 penalties)	Railways

Bakshi Stadium, Srinagar

== Quarterfinal League ==
Group A

Team	Pld	W	D	L	GF	GA	GD	Pts
Services	3	3	0	0	8	3	+5	9
Punjab	3	2	0	1	7	2	+5	6
Kerala	3	1	0	2	3	9	−6	3
Jammu and Kashmir	3	0	0	3	3	7	−4	0

5 June 2008

Punjab	1–2	Services
H Singh 66'		Raleng 7'; Lalruatafela 27'

Bakshi Stadium, Srinagar

5 June 2008

Kerala	3–1	Jammu and Kashmir
OK Javed 10'; Naushad 53'; Saheer 81'		I Ahmed 44'

Polo Ground, Srinagar

7 June 2008

Services	3–0	Kerala
Raleng 66', 74', 85'

Bakshi Stadium, Srinagar

8 June 2008

Jammu and Kashmir	0–1	Punjab
		Su Singh 68'

Polo Ground, Srinagar

9 June 2008

Jammu and Kashmir	2–3	Services
R Kumar 57'; I Ahmed 75'		Raleng 8', 70'; D'Silva 62'

Bakshi Stadium, Srinagar

9 June 2008

Kerala	0–5	Punjab
		Sa Singh 54'; Singh Sahni 60', 89'; B Singh 62'; A Singh 76'

Bakshi Stadium, Srinagar

Group B

Team	Pld	W	D	L	GF	GA	GD	Pts
Karnataka	3	2	0	1	3	4	−1	6
West Bengal	3	1	2	0	5	2	+3	5
Goa	3	1	1	1	2	1	+1	4
Maharashtra	3	0	1	2	1	4	−3	1

6 June 2008

Goa	2–1	West Bengal

Polo Ground, Srinagar

6 June 2008

Maharashtra	0–1	Karnataka
		Vijayakumar 21'

Bakshi Stadium, Srinagar

8 June 2008

Karnataka	1–4	West Bengal
Vijayakumar 78'		Ashim Das 45' (pen.); Dutta 68'; Nabi 75'; T Ahmed 85'

Bakshi Stadium, Srinagar

8 June 2008

Goa	2–0	Maharashtra
Dias 80'; Franco 83' (pen.)

Polo Ground, Srinagar

10 June 2008

Karnataka	1–0	Goa
Vijayakumar 54'

Bakshi Stadium, Srinagar

31 May 2008

West Bengal	1–1	Maharashtra
Sen 54'		Velho 44'

Polo Ground, Srinagar

== Semifinals ==
12 December 2008

Services	4–1	West Bengal
Sochungmi Raleng 23', 89', 90+3'; Norgan Lama 78'	Report(subscription required)	Oraon 80'

Bakshi Stadium, Srinagar

13 June 2008

Karnataka	0–0 (a.e.t.)	Punjab
	Report Archived 2023-10-12 at the Wayback Machine(subscription required)
Penalties
Rajendra Prasad (penalty scored); Minj (penalty scored); Vijay Kumar (penalty scored); Srinath (penalty missed); Santh Kumar (penalty missed)	3–4	Jaspal Singh (penalty scored); Jagpreet Singh (penalty scored); Sukhwinder Singh (penalty scored); Ravinder Singh (penalty scored); Balwant Singh (penalty missed)

Bakshi Stadium, Srinagar

== Final ==
15 June 2008

Services	0–1	Punjab
		Jaspal Singh 51' (pen.)

Bakshi Stadium, Srinagar
