= Farhan Ganie =

Indian footballer (born 1995)

Farhaan Ganie
Personal information
- Full name: Farhan Ganie
- Date of birth: 1 March 1995 (age 31)
- Place of birth: Jammu and Kashmir, India
- Height: 1.78 m (5 ft 10 in)
- Position: Defensive midfielder

Team information
- Current team: J&K Bank Football Club
- Number: 12

Senior career*
| Years | Team | Apps | (Gls) |
| 2017– | Real Kashmir | 50 | (1) |
- * Club domestic league appearances and goals as of 15:30, 15 March 2022 (UTC)

Farhan Ganie (born 1 March 1995), is an Indian footballer who played as a defensive midfielder for Real Kashmir in the I-League. Farhan Currently plays for J&K Bank Football Club.

== Career ==
After playing in the second division with Real Kashmir for two seasons, he made his professional debut at the age of 26 for the club in a match against Minerva Punjab FC on 31 October 2018 in I League. Ganie scored his first goal for the club in a match against Churchill Brothers on 31 January 2019.

== Honours ==
Real Kashmir

- IFA Shield: 2020, 2021
