= Mohammed Yusuf Ansari =

Former Indian International footballer

Yusuf Ansari
Personal information
- Full name: Mohammed Yusuf Ansari
- Date of birth: 19 June 1970 (age 56)
- Place of birth: Mumbai, Maharashtra, India
- Position: Goalkeeper

Team information
- Current team: Real Kashmir (goalkeeping coach)

Senior career*
Years	Team	Apps	(Gls)
1992	Air India F.C.		

International career
1990–1997	India		

Managerial career
- 2010–2011: Air India F.C. (head coach)
- 2011-2013: Air India F.C. (goalkeeping coach)
- 2014–2017: Maharashtra football team (head coach)
- 2017–2018: Indian Arrows (goalkeeping coach)
- 2018–2020: Kerala Blasters B (goalkeeping coach)
- 2020–2021: Kerala Blasters (goalkeeping coach)
- 2023–: Real Kashmir (goalkeeping coach)
- * Club domestic league appearances and goals

Mohammed Yusuf Ansari (born 19 June 1970) is a former Indian professional footballer who played as a goalkeeper. He currently goalkeeping coach of the I-League club Real Kashmir.

== Playing career ==
Yusuf Ansari started his professional football career with Air India F.C. in 1992 and was also a part of the Maharastra State Football Team. Later, he became part of India national football team which played 1992 Olympics Men's Asian qualifiers and 1993 World Cup qualifiers. His notable matches for the national team include two appearances in 1991 Olympics qualifiers against Syria national football team. He was also a part of 1993 Nehru Cup squad.

== Coaching career ==
=== Air India ===
On 14 December 2010, Yusuf Ansari was appointed as the new head coach of Air India FC. The team finished 12th in the 2009–10 I-League. Following the season, he resigned from the head coach position and was later appointed as the goalkeeping coach under Santosh Kashyap. After spending two years there he left the team in 2013.

=== Maharashtra State Football team ===
In 2014, he joined Maharashtra Football team as their head coach. He coached the team in several tournaments including the Santosh Trophy.

=== Indian Arrows ===
Yusuf Ansari joined the I-league side Indian Arrows in 2017 as their goalkeeping coach for one season.

=== Kerala Blasters ===
In 2018, he joined the Indian Super League club Kerala Blasters as the goalkeeping coach for their reserves. After spending two years with the youth teams, he was promoted to the senior team of the Blasters as their new goalkeeping coach in April 2020.

== Personal life ==
Born in Mumbai, Maharastra, Yusuf Ansari was appointed as the assistant manager in Air India. His father was also a footballer who played for Indian Railways.

== Statistics ==
=== Managerial statistics ===
Team	From	To	P	W	D	L	GF	GA	Win%!
Air India F.C.	2009	June 2010	26	7	7	12	28	46	26.92

== Honours ==
India

- SAFF Championship: 1993; runner-up: 1995
