= Prince of Wales College (disambiguation) =

Prince of Wales College is a former university college, which was located in Charlottetown, Prince Edward Island, Canada

Prince of Wales College may also refer to:

- Achimota School, formerly Prince of Wales College and School, Achimota, Ghana
- Govt. Gandhi Memorial Science College, formerly Prince of Wales College, Jammu, Jammu & Kashmir, India
- Prince of Wales' College, Moratuwa, Sri Lanka
