= Positive Kashmir Football Championship =

Football tournament in Jammu and Kashmir, India

- Organising body: The Positive Kashmir and Jammu and Kashmir Sports Council
- Founded: 2021; 4 years ago
- Current champions: J&K Bank Football Club
- 2022

The Positive Kashmir Football Championship is an annual football tournament organized by The Positive Kashmir and Jammu and Kashmir Sports Council. The first edition was held in September and October 2021. J&K Bank defeated J&K SPDC XI by 5–2 in the finals. The second edition was kicked off in October to November 2022. The defending champion J&K Bank defeated FC One with 1–0.

== Results ==
Years	Winner	Ref
2021	J&K Bank	
2022	J&K Bank	
