= Wayne Vaz =

Indian footballer

Personal information
- Full name: Wayne Bosco Vaz
- Date of birth: 28 July 1994 (age 32)
- Place of birth: Mumbai, India
- Height: 1.77 m (5 ft 10 in)
- Position: Midfielder

Team information
- Current team: Inter Kashi
- Number: 5

Youth career
- Air India FC

Senior career*
Years	Team	Apps	(Gls)
2016–2017	Chennai City	2	(0)
2017–2019	Pune City	0	(0)
2018–2019	→ Churchill Brothers (loan)	26	(1)
2019–2021	NorthEast United	10	(0)
2021–2023	Mohammedan	23	(0)
2023–2024	Real Kashmir	20	(1)
2024–2025	Rajasthan United	19	(1)
2025–	Inter Kashi	12	(0)
- * Club domestic league appearances and goals as of 16:00, 21 May 2026 (UTC)

Wayne Bosco Vaz (born 28 July 1994) is an Indian professional footballer who plays as a midfielder for Indian Super League club Inter Kashi.

== Career ==
=== Chennai City ===
Wayne Vaz was hired by I-League debutant Chennai City F.C. for 2016–17 season.

=== Pune City ===
On 23 July 2017, FC Pune City opted for Vaz as their ninth draft pick in 2017–18 ISL Players Draft.

=== Churchill Brothers ===
After signing for FC Pune City the defender went on loan to Churchill Brothers back to back for I-league season 2017–18 and 2018–19.

=== NorthEast United FC ===
On 3 June 2019, Vaz signed for ISL side NorthEast United FC.

== Career statistics ==
=== Club ===
As of 6 April 2025

Club	Season	League			Cup		AFC		Total	
Club	Season	Division	Apps	Goals	Apps	Goals	Apps	Goals	Apps	Goals
Chennai City	2016–17	I-League	2	0	2 (Note: Appearance(s) in Federation Cup)	0	—		4	0
Churchill Brothers (loan)	2017–18	I-League	10	1	0	0	—		10	1
Churchill Brothers (loan)	2018–19	I-League	16	0	0	0	—		16	0
NorthEast United	2019–20	Indian Super League	10	0	0	0	—		10	0
NorthEast United	2020–21	Indian Super League	0	0	0	0	—		0	0
NorthEast United	Total		10	0	0	0	0	0	10	0
Mohammedan	2021–22	I-League	13	0	3 (Note: Appearance(s) in Durand Cup)	0	—		16	0
Mohammedan	2022–23	I-League	10	0	3	0	—		13	0
Mohammedan	Total		23	0	6	0	0	0	29	0
Real Kashmir	2023–24	I-League	20	1	0	0	—		20	1
Rajasthan United	2024–25	I-League	19	1	0	0	—		19	1
Career total			100	3	8	0	0	0	108	3

== Honours ==
Mohammedan Sporting

- I-League: 2021–22
