= Kashmir Champions League =

- Organising body: Jammu and Kashmir Sports Council
- Founded: 2026
- Country: India
- Region: Jammu and Kashmir
- Current champions: Baramulla Strikers
- Current: 2026

Kashmir Champions League (KCL) is a professional football league held in Jammu and Kashmir, India. The competition is organised by the Jammu and Kashmir Sports Council and features teams representing districts of the Kashmir division. The inaugural edition of the competition was held in 2026.

== History ==
The Kashmir Champions League was established in 2026 by the Jammu and Kashmir Sports Council. The inaugural competition featured footballers representing different districts of the Kashmir division, with players participating in preparations ahead of the tournament.

== 2026 season ==
The inaugural edition was won by Baramulla Strikers. They defeated Srinagar United in the final.

== Champions ==
| Season | Champions | Runners-up |
|---|---|---|
| 2026 | Baramulla Strikers | Srinagar United |

== See also ==
- Kashmir Super League
- Football in Jammu and Kashmir
