= Jeremy Laldinpuia =

Indian footballer (born 2000)

Personal information
- Date of birth: 3 June 2000 (age 26)
- Place of birth: Mizoram, India
- Position: Midfielder

Team information
- Current team: Real Kashmir
- Number: 28

Youth career
- –2018: Shillong Lajong

Senior career*
Years	Team	Apps	(Gls)
2018–2021	Chanmari		
2021–2022	Hindustan		
2022–2023	Aizawl	11	(1)
2023	Diamond Harbour	4	(0)
2023–2024	Real Kashmir		
2024	Mohammedan		
- * Club domestic league appearances and goals

Jeremy Laldinpuia (born 3 June 2000) is an Indian professional footballer who plays as a midfielder.

== Club career ==
Born in Mizoram, Laldinpuia began his career with the Shillong Lajong youth team. On 16 July 2018, it was announced that Landinpuia had signed with Mizoram Premier League club Chanmari. He stayed with the club until 2021, joining Hindustan.

=== Aizawl ===
In August 2022, Laldinpuia signed with I-League club Aizawl. He made his debut for the club on 8 September 2022 against Chawnpui FC in the opening round of the Mizoram Premier League. Laldinpuia scored his first goal in the same match, his 38th-minute strike giving Aizawl the lead in their 4–2 victory.

On 15 November 2022, Laldinpuia made his professional debut for Aizawl in their opening I-League match against TRAU. He came on as a last minute substitute in the 1–1 draw.

== Career statistics ==
=== Club ===
As of 11 March 2023

Club	Season	League			Cup		AFC		Total	
Club	Season	Division	Apps	Goals	Apps	Goals	Apps	Goals	Apps	Goals
Aizawl	2022–23	I-League	11	1	0	0	–		11	1
Career total			11	1	0	0	0	0	11	1
