= Bakshi Stadium =

Stadium in Kashmir

- Location: Wazir Bagh Srinagar
- Capacity: 30,000
- Surface: Grass

Construction
- Cost: $4 million

Tenants
- JK XI; Real Kashmir FC

Bakshi Stadium is a stadium in Wazir Bagh, Srinagar, Kashmir. The stadium can host 30,000 spectators and is mainly used for football matches.It has also been recently shortlisted to hold the Legends League Cricket Matches, which includes many famous players including Martin Guptill, Chris Gayle, Shikhar Dhawan, Dinesh Karthik, Harbajan Singh, The Pathan Brothers. It will be holding 7 matches including the final.The stadium is able to host the highest-standard matches, including some of Real Kashmir FC in the I-League.

It is one of the biggest football stadiums in Indian-administered Kashmir. As per FIFA norms, stadium would be developed to world-class facility with the budget of ₹44 crore.
