= Jammu and Kashmir Football Association =

State governing body of Football in Jammu and Kashmir

- Sport: Football
- Jurisdiction: Jammu and Kashmir
- Membership: 20 district associations
- Abbreviation: JKFA
- Founded: 1964; 62 years ago
- Affiliation: All India Football Federation (AIFF)
- Headquarters: Bakshi Stadium, Srinagar

The Jammu and Kashmir Football Association (JKFA) is one of the 36 Indian state football associations affiliated with the All India Football Federation. The Jammu and Kashmir Football Association is the governing body for football in Jammu and Kashmir. It was formed and granted recognition by the Jammu & Kashmir State Sports Council and the AIFF in 1964. JKFA most notably organises the Jammu & Kashmir Premier Football League. It also sends state teams for the Santosh Trophy and the Rajmata Jijabai Trophy.

== State teams ==
=== Men ===
- Jammu and Kashmir football team
- Jammu and Kashmir under-20 football team
- Jammu and Kashmir under-15 football team
- Jammu and Kashmir under-13 football team

=== Women ===
- Jammu and Kashmir women's football team
- Jammu and Kashmir women's under-19 football team
- Jammu and Kashmir women's under-17 football team

== Affiliated district associations ==
All 20 district of Jammu and Kashmir are affiliated with the Jammu and Kashmir Football Association.

No.	Association	District
1	Anantnag District Football Association	Anantnag
2	Bandipore District Football Association	Bandipore
3	Baramulla District Football Association	Baramulla
4	Budgam District Football Association	Budgam
5	Doda District Football Association	Doda
6	Ganderbal District Football Association	Ganderbal
7	Jammu District Football Association	Jammu
8	Kathua District Football Association	Kathua
9	Kishtwar District Football Association	Kishtwar
10	Kulgam District Football Association	Kulgam
11	Kupwara District Football Association	Kupwara
12	Poonch District Football Association	Poonch
13	Pulwama District Football Association	Pulwama
14	Rajouri District Football Association	Rajouri
15	Ramban District Football Association	Ramban
16	Reasi District Football Association	Reasi
17	Samba District Football Association	Samba
18	Shopian District Football Association	Shopian
19	Srinagar District Football Association	Srinagar
20	Udhampur District Football Association	Udhampur

== J&K league pyramid ==
JKFA Premier Football League
Tier	Division
I _{(Level 5 on Indian Football pyramid)}	Premier Division
II _{(Level 6 on Indian Football pyramid)}	Super Division
III _{(Level 7 on Indian Football pyramid)}	A-Division
IV _{(Level 8 on Indian Football pyramid)}	B-Division

== See also ==
- Football in India
- Kashmir Champions League
- Kashmir Super League
