= Shaher Shaheen =

Syrian footballer (born 1990)

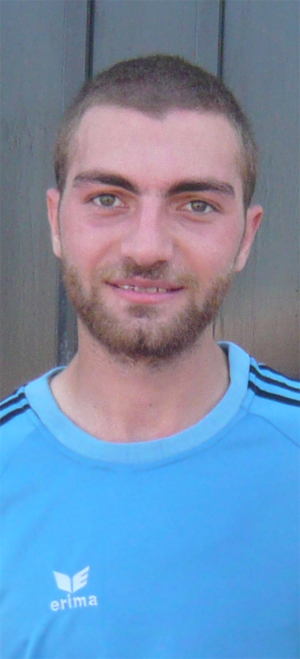
- Shaheen in 2010

Personal information
- Full name: Shaher Saheen
- Date of birth: 2 January 1990 (age 36)
- Place of birth: Jeddah, Saudi Arabia
- Height: 1.94 m (6 ft 4 1/2 in)
- Position: Centre-back

Team information
- Current team: Dempo
- Number: 16

Youth career
- Al-Karamah

Senior career*
Years	Team	Apps	(Gls)
2009–2013	Al-Karamah	59	(9)
2013–2014	Al-Asalah	13	(3)
2014–2015	G.Antep spor	22	(4)
2015–2016	Al-Watani	18	(0)
2017–2018	Galali	16	(2)
2018	Al-Ittihad		
2021–2023	Mohammedan	44	(0)
2023–2024	Real Kashmir	21	(3)
2025–	Dempo	10	(1)

International career
2009	Syria U20		
- * Club domestic league appearances and goals as of 26 January 2025

Shaher Shaheen (Arabic: شاهر شاهين; born 2 January 1990) is a professional footballer who plays as a defender for I-League club Dempo SC. Born in Saudi Arabia, he has represented Syria at youth level.

== Club career ==
=== Early career ===
Shaher Shaheen signed for Al-Karamah SC as a youth team player on 2009 and rose through the club's youth sides before moving to Jordan League Division 1 side Al-Asalah in 2013.

=== Mohammedan ===
In June 2021, Shaheen moved to India and signed with Mohammedan SC, that competes in the I-League.

He was part of the team's 2021 Durand Cup campaign, in which he appeared in all the matches, and reached to the final, defeating FC Bengaluru United 4–2. On 3 October 2021, they lost the title winning match 1–0 to ISL side FC Goa.

He also appeared in the 2021 CFL Premier Division league, in which Mohammedan reached to the final, defeating United SC 1–0. On 18 November, Mohammedan clinched their 12th Calcutta Football League title after forty long years, defeating Railway FC 1–0, in which he played.

He made his league debut on 27 December in their 2–1 win against Sudeva Delhi FC. Under Nikola Stojanović's captaincy, Shaheen and his team Mohammedan for the first time, ran for their maiden national league title in 2021–22 I-League season, but finished as runners-up after a 2–1 defeat to Gokulam Kerala at the end.

=== Real Kashmir ===
In October 2023, Shaheen moved to another I-League club Real Kashmir. In the 2023–24 season opener against Rajasthan United on 28 October, he scored his debut goal in their 2–0 win.

== International career ==
Shaher Shaheen was a member of the Syrian U-20 national team and appeared in couple of matches.

== Honours ==
Mohammedan Sporting

- Calcutta Football League: 2021, 2022
- Durand Cup runner-up: 2021
- I-League runner-up: 2021–22
