= Hudson Jesus =

Brazilian footballer (born 1991)

Personal information
- Full name: Hudson Dias de Jesus
- Date of birth: 11 January 1991 (age 35)
- Place of birth: Brazil
- Height: 1.88 m (6 ft 2 in)
- Position: Forward

Senior career*
Years	Team	Apps	(Gls)
2015–2016	Fortaleza		
2015–2016	→ Santa Cruz (loan)		
2016	Santa Cruz		
2016	→ Potiguar (loan)		
2016	→ CSE (loan)	10	(1)
2016–2017	Santa Cruz		
2017	→ Cabofriense (loan)		
2017	Nacional	19	(1)
2017–2018	Covilhã	17	(2)
2019	Sarawak		
2020–2021	Kuching City	14	(4)
2021–2022	Campo Grande	8	(0)
2022–2023	Tapajós	8	(1)
2023	Trem		
2023–2024	Delhi FC	11	(2)
- * Club domestic league appearances and goals

Hudson Dias de Jesus (born 11 January 1991) is a Brazilian professional footballer who plays as a forward.
