= David Simbo =

Sierra Leonean footballer (born 1989)

Personal information
- Date of birth: 28 September 1989 (age 37)
- Place of birth: Freetown, Sierra Leone
- Height: 1.90 m (6 ft 3 in)
- Position: Centre-back

Youth career
- Mighty Blackpool

Senior career*
Years	Team	Apps	(Gls)
2007–2008	Mighty Blackpool		
2009	Raufoss		
2010	Sogndal	0	(0)
2010–2011	Mighty Blackpool		
2011	→ Motala (loan)	11	(0)
2011	→ Trelleborg (loan)	0	(0)
2012	Boden	12	(2)
2013–2014	Sandviken	9	(0)
2014–2015	Al-Hilal		
2015	Najran	2	(0)
2016	Krumkachy Minsk	3	(0)
2016–2017	Yeni Amasyaspor	12	(0)
2017–2018	Kurtuluşspor		
2018–2019	Adana Kiremithanespor	16	(2)
2019	Al-Zawraa		
2019–2022	Baf Ülkü Yurdu	2	(0)
2022	Gokulam Kerala	0	(0)
2022–2024	NEROCA	35	(2)

International career
2010–2018	Sierra Leone	21	(0)
- * Club domestic league appearances and goals

David Simbo (born 28 September 1989) is a Sierra Leonean former professional footballer who played as a defender.

== Club career ==
Born in Freetown, Simbo started his career playing for Mighty Blackpool in his home country. In 2009, he went to Norway to play for third-tier side Raufoss. While at the Norwegian club, he sought political asylum in the country using the name Mohamed Sesay. After his successful first season in Norway, he was signed by second-tier club Sogndal; however, because his asylum request was denied due to him using two different names, he was unable to return to Norway to play for them.

Simbo returned to Sierra Leone to play for Mighty Blackpool. In 2011, he went on loan to Swedish third-tier club Motala for the first half of the season, and then Allsvenskan club Trelleborg for the second half of the season.

He spent the 2012 season with Boden.

In 2013, he signed for Sandviken.

He signed for Saudi club Najran SC in July 2015. He then played for Krumkachy Minsk.

He later played in Turkey for Yeni Amasyaspor, and Kurtuluşspor. He spent the 2018–19 season with Adana Kiremithanespor.

He then played for Iraqi club Al-Zawraa. In September 2019, he moved to North Cyprus to play for Baf Ulku Yurdu FC.

In February 2022, Simbo moved to India after signing with I-League defending champions Gokulam Kerala.

He moved to NEROCA in August 2022.

== International career ==
He made his international debut for Sierra Leone against Egypt in their 1–1 draw in 2010.

== Honours ==
Al-Hilal Omdurman

- Sudan Premier League: 2014

Gokulam Kerala

- I-League: 2021–22
