= Kashmir Avengers FC =

Indian association football club

Kashmir Avengers
- Full name: Kashmir Avengers Football Club
- Nickname: The Avengers
- Short name: KAFC
- Founded: 2020; 6 years ago
- Owner: Arshed Ahmad Zargar
- League: JKFA Professional League; Kashmir Super League
Home colours	Away colours

Kashmir Avengers Football Club (abbreviated as KAFC), also known as Aqua Kashmir Avengers for sponsorship reasons, is an Indian professional football club based in Srinagar, Jammu and Kashmir, that competes in the JKFA Professional League and the Kashmir Super League. It is an institutional club and are owned by Arshed Ahmed Zargar. The U-18 team plays in NIFF Youth Football League. The senior team also participated in the first edition of the Real Kashmir Cup.

== Logo ==
Club logo used until 2025

== Kit manufacturers and shirt sponsors ==
Period	Kit manufacturer	Shirt sponsor
2020–2021		PUF Panels
2021–2022	SIX5SIX	PUF Panels

== Honours ==
- All India Mahatma Gandhi Memorial Football Cup
  - Winners (1): 2021
