= Hyder Yousuf =

Indian footballer (born 2000)

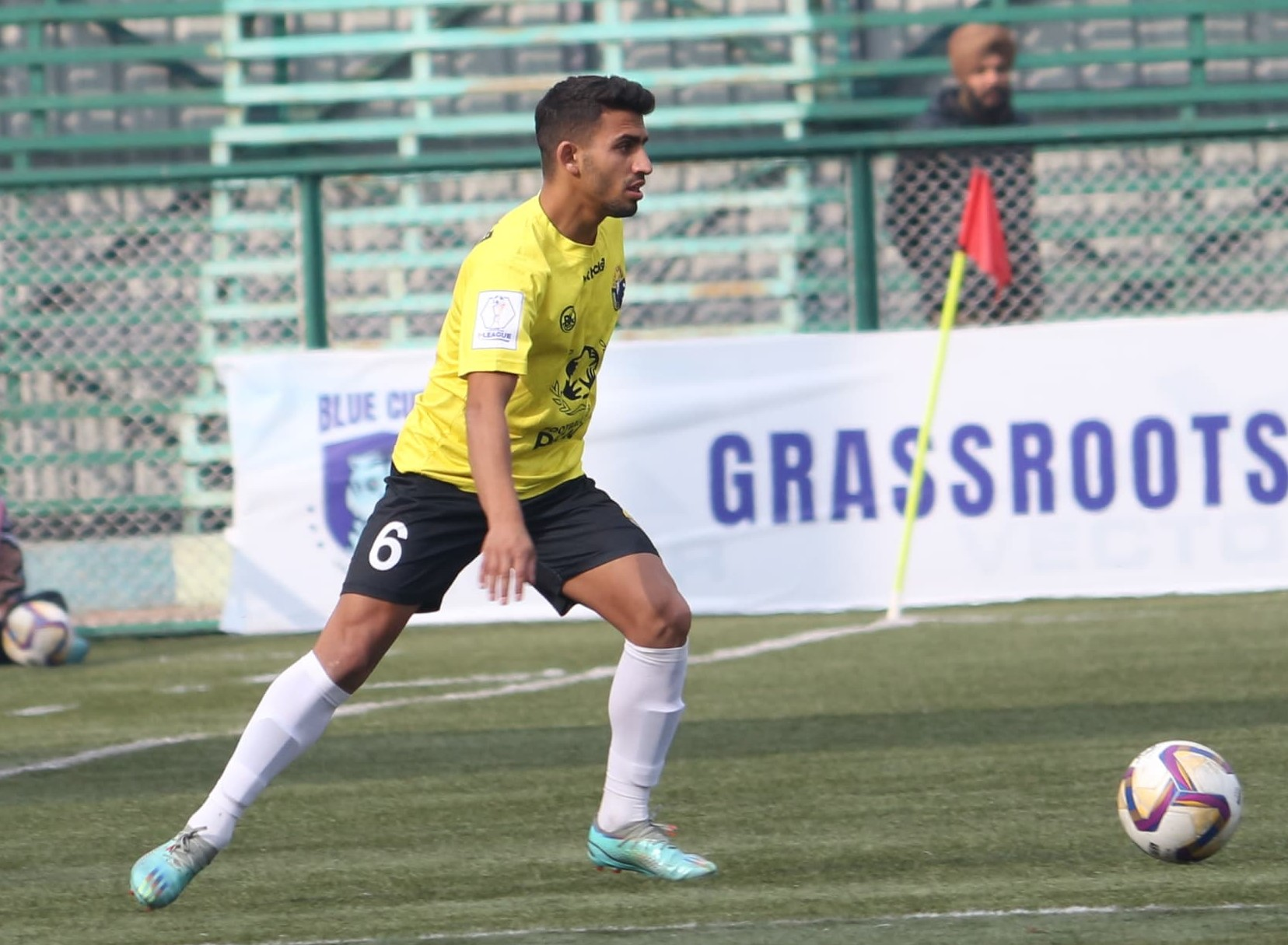
- Hyder playing for Real Kashmir FC

Personal information
- Date of birth: 17 February 2000 (age 26)
- Place of birth: Srinagar, Jammu and Kashmir, India
- Height: 1.72 m (5 ft 8 in)
- Position: Right-back

Team information
- Current team: Real Kashmir
- Number: 6

Senior career*
Years	Team	Apps	(Gls)
2021–2022	Lonestar Kashmir	6	(0)
2022–2023	Downtown Heroes	13	(0)
2023-	Real Kashmir	21	(1)
- * Club domestic league appearances and goals

Hyder Yousuf (born 17 February 2000) is an Indian professional footballer who plays as a right-back for I-League club Real Kashmir.

== Career ==
Born and brought up in Jammu & Kashmir, Yousuf started playing football at the age of 12. Yousuf represented his home side Jammu and Kashmir football team in 2021–22 Santosh Trophy and 2022–23 Santosh Trophy.

In 2022, while Yousuf was pursuing his graduation at Gandhi Memorial College, he joined Downtown Heroes FC. He featured a total of three matches for Downtown Heroes FC in 2023 Durand Cup.
