= Gnohere Krizo =

Ivorian footballer

Gnoheré Krizo
Personal information
- Full name: Gnoheré Krizo
- Date of birth: 20 June 1997 (age 29)
- Place of birth: Saïoua, Ivory Coast
- Height: 2.01 m (6 ft 7 in)
- Position: Striker

Senior career*
Years	Team	Apps	(Gls)
2016	Slutsk	9	(0)
2016–2017	Saxan	7	(0)
2017	Lokomotiv Tashkent	2	(0)
2018–2020	Real Kashmir	26	(7)
2022	Churchill Brothers	9	(2)
2022	Bhawanipore	14	(6)
2023	Namlha		
2023–2024	Real Kashmir	11	(7)
2024	Karbala		
2025	Churchill Brothers	2	(0)
2025	Real Kashmir	13	(4)
2026	Samaleswari		
- * Club domestic league appearances and goals as of 21:45, 6 April 2025 (UTC)

Gnoheré Krizo (born 20 June 1997) is a French-Ivorian professional footballer who plays as a striker.

== Club career ==
Krizo started his career in Belarus with FC Slutsk. After an unsuccessful stint in Moldova, he moved in January 2017, to Uzbek League champions Lokomotiv Tashkent. He only made 2 appearances for the club, and left the club in January 2018.

=== Real Kashmir ===
For the 2018–19 season, Krizo joined Indian I-League club Real Kashmir FC. He broke into the first team, and scored 4 goals in 16 games in his first season. The club also took him for the next season till 2020 and he also played in tournaments like Durand Cup and played against Jamshedpur FC in a pre-season friendly.

=== Churchill Brothers ===
Krizo joined Churchill Brothers during the 2021–22 season and scored his first goal on 1 April 2022 in their 4–2 win over NEROCA in the I-League. His second goal came as a winner against RoundGlass Punjab on 3 May in his team's 2–1 win. Krizo came in as substitute and scored from close range in the 85th minute.

== Career statistics ==
=== Club ===
As of 5 August 2022

Club	Season	League			Cup		Continental		Total	
Club	Season	Division	Apps	Goals	Apps	Goals	Apps	Goals	Apps	Goals
Slutsk	2016	Belarusian Premier League	9	0	0	0	–		9	0
Saxan	2016–17	Moldovan National Division	7	0	0	0	–		7	0
Lokomotiv Tashkent	2017	Uzbekistan Super League	2	0	0	0	3 (Note: Appearance(s) in AFC Champions League)	0	5	0
Real Kashmir	2018–19	I-League	16	4	0	0	–		16	2
Real Kashmir	2019–20	I-League	10	3	1 (Note: Appearance(s) in Durand Cup)	1	–		11	4
Churchill Brothers	2021–22	I-League	9	2	0	0	–		9	2
Bhawanipore	2022	Calcutta Football League	1	1	0	0	—		1	1
Career total			54	10	1	1	3	0	58	11

== Honours ==
Bhawanipore

- Naihati Gold Cup: 2022
- CFL Premier Division A runner-up: 2022
