= Renan Paulino =

Brazilian footballer

Personal information
- Full name: Renan Paulino de Souza
- Date of birth: 15 February 1995 (age 31)
- Place of birth: São Paulo, Brazil
- Height: 1.80 m (5 ft 11 in)
- Position: Midfielder

Youth career
- Portuguesa

Senior career*
Years	Team	Apps	(Gls)
2013–2015	Portuguesa	35	(1)
2015–2017	Atlético Paranaense	10	(1)
2016	→ Ferroviária (loan)	1	(0)
2017	→ Náutico (loan)	10	(0)
2018	Maringá	2	(0)
2019	Bragantino	3	(0)
2020	Anápolis	7	(0)
2020–2022	Água Santa	1	(0)
2022–2023	Banga	41	(2)
2023–2025	Shillong Lajong	38	(9)
- * Club domestic league appearances and goals as of 23:44, 5 April 2025 (UTC)

Renan Paulino de Souza (born 15 February 1995), known as Renan Paulino or simply Renan, is a Brazilian professional footballer who plays as a midfielder. He has spent most of his career playing in South American clubs, notably Portuguesa.

== Club career ==
Born in the city of São Paulo, Renan began his professional football career by joining the team Associação Portuguesa de Desportos (also called Portuguesa), making his debut on 22 August 2013 where he started in a 1–2 home loss against Bahia, for that year's Copa Sudamericana. While it was his first appearance of the year, his side was ultimately relegated out of Série A. Renan was later promoted to his team's main squad in 2014, and became a regular starter in the year's Campeonato Paulista. On 24 May he scored his first professional goal, netting the last in a 2–0 home win against Atlético Goianiense for the Série B championship. Overall, Renan appeared in 17 league matches during 2014, though Portuguesa suffered another relegation. On 17 August 2015, he signed a three-year contract with Atlético Paranaense, after being previously on trial at the club. On 14 December 2015, Renan was loaned to Ferroviária, until the end of 2016 Campeonato Paulista. After returning from loan, he made his top tier debut on 21 August 2016, starting in a 0–1 away loss against Atlético Mineiro.

=== FK Banga ===
In January 2022 he signed with the Lithuanian club FK Banga Gargždai (Banga), which is part of the league A Lyga. It was the first time playing in Europe.

=== Shillong Lajong ===
In October 2023, Paulino joined Indian I-League club Shillong Lajong. He scored his first league goal on 9 November, against NEROCA at SSA Stadium, in their 1–1 draw.
