= Real Kashmir FC =

Indian association football club based in Srinagar

Real Kashmir
- Full name: Real Kashmir Football Club
- Nickname: Sheeni Seh (The Snow leopards)
- Short name: RKFC
- Founded: 2016; 10 years ago
- Ground: Bakshi Stadium; TRC Turf Ground
- Capacity: 30,000; 10,000
- Owner: Arshad Shawl
- Head coach: Ishfaq Ahmed
- League: Indian Football League
- 2025–26: Indian Football League, 7th of 10
- Website: realkashmirfc.in
Home colours	Away colours

Real Kashmir Football Club is an Indian professional football club based in Srinagar, Jammu and Kashmir. Incorporated in 2016, the club currently competes in the Indian Football League, the second tier of the Indian football league system. Real Kashmir with its reserve side also participates in the Jammu & Kashmir Premier Football League regionally.

Nicknamed "Sheeni Seh" (transl. Snow Leopards), Real Kashmir is the first club from Jammu and Kashmir to earn promotion in any top flight football league of the country. They also won the IFA Shield title in 2022. Club's futsal section has been competing in the state league, as well as AIFF Futsal Club Championship, the highest division in the country.

== History ==
=== Foundation and early history ===
The origin of Real Kashmir FC dates to 2014 after devastating floods swept through the region, causing massive loss of life and property. To keep the youth, who had lost much during the floods, engaged, Shamim Meraj, editor of a local newspaper named Kashmir Monitor, and Sandeep Chattoo, a local businessman, came together to arrange footballers.

What began as a community outreach programme garnered support from the local populace, and it soon started evolving into something more. Real Kashmir FC as a club formalised in 2016 and affiliated with Jammu & Kashmir Football Association (JKFA) under the efforts of Chattoo. Founded in 2016, Real Kashmir FC emerged as the first ever top-flight professional football club in Jammu and Kashmir.

=== Later years ===
Shortly after its formation, the club participated in their first national competition in September 2016 when they competed in the 2016 Durand Cup. In January 2017, Real Kashmir roped in David Robertson as their new head coach, and in July, it became the first club from Jammu & Kashmir to play on foreign soil by playing 4 matches in Scotland. They appeared in their first major tournament by competing in the 2016–17 I-League 2nd Division, but failed to reach to the final round. They have been participating in all four categories of the AIFF.

In May 2018, Real Kashmir FC earned promotion to the 2018–19 I-League by winning the 2017–18 I-League 2nd Division after defeating Hindustan in the final game of the season by a score of 3–2. On 30 May 2018, Real Kashmir became champions of the I-League 2nd Division. This was only their second season at this level, after the club's inception in 2016, earning promotion to the I-League for the first time ahead of the 2018–19 season. In October 2018, they clinched Jammu & Kashmir Invitational Cup, jointly with Minerva Punjab. On 11 December 2018, they witnessed one of the league's biggest wins, after they beat Shillong Lajong by 6–1. Real Kashmir achieved third place in their debut season.

In August 2018, the Real Kashmir FC youth team travelled to Germany for pre-season training with Borussia Dortmund. The team visited Borussia Dortmund's training facilities during the tour. They participated in 2019 Durand Cup and reached the semi-finals, where they lost 3–1 to Mohun Bagan. On 19 December 2020, Real Kashmir won the 123rd edition of the IFA Shield tournament, defeating George Telegraph at the Salt Lake Stadium in Kolkata. The title marked the club's first major domestic triumph since its establishment in 2016.

For I-League 2021, they borrowed three players (Danish Bhat, Adnan Ayoub, Farhan Ganie) from J&K Bank Football Club. In the 2020–21 I-League, the club finished their campaign in fifth place (Play-off), accumulating 21 points with 5 wins in 15 matches. As the defending champions of IFA Shield, Real Kashmir began its 2021 edition campaign on 24 November with a 3–0 win over Indian Arrows. They retained their title with a 2–1 win against Sreenidi Deccan on 15 December. The club failed to make an impact in the 2021–22 I-League season and finished on twelfth place. In midway of the 2022–23 season, the club hired Gifton Noel-Williams as new head coach, who succeeded Mehrajuddin Wadoo in February 2023. In 2024, Arshad Shawl acquired the ownership of Real Kashmir. In the 2024–25 I-League, the club finished the season undefeated at home soil.

== Kit manufacturers and shirt sponsors ==
Period	Kit manufacturer	Shirt sponsor
2016–2018	None	The Kashmir Monitor
2018–2021	Adidas	Hotel Ch2
2021–2022	SIX5SIX	Hotel Ch2
2022–2023	Nivia	Hotel Ch2
2023–2024	Vector X	Football for Peace
2024	BK Sports	Casyno Days
2024–present	Hummel	Livpure

== Stadium ==
The club is currently using the 10,000-capacity TRC Turf Ground in Srinagar as their home ground. Since 2015, the ground is being used in I-League 2nd Division as the home ground for their rival Lonestar Kashmir, and I-League for Real Kashmir. The ground is operated by the Jammu & Kashmir Football Association and renovated in 2015. It has artificial turf.

== Rivalry ==
Real Kashmir has a rivalry with their fellow Jammu & Kashmir-based club Lonestar Kashmir FC, that participated in the I-League 2nd Division. The team has also participated in the inaugural 2020–21 Real Kashmir Cup, which was hosted at the TRC Turf Ground.

== Players ==
=== First-team squad ===
As of August 2026

Note: Flags indicate national team as defined under FIFA eligibility rules; some limited exceptions apply. Players may hold more than one non-FIFA nationality.

No.	Pos.	Nation	Player
1	GK	IND	Furqan Ahmad Dar
5	MF	IND	Ifham Tariq Mir
6	DF	IND	Hyder Yousuf
10	FW	IND	Mohammad Asrar Rehber
11	FW	IND	Ateeb Ahmed Dar
12	MF	IND	Huzafah Ahmad Dar
13	GK	IND	Shivam Kiran Pednekar
18	DF	IND	Shahid Nazir
21	DF	IND	Zahid Yousuf
26	DF	IND	Hafiz Ur Rehman Khan
29	MF	IND	Adnan Ayub
30	DF	IND	Wayne Vaz

No.	Pos.	Nation	Player
—	GK	IND	James Kithan
—	FW	TTO	Marcus Joseph
—	DF	IND	Oinam Sanatomba
—	FW	BFA	Eric Traoré
—	FW	LES	Thabiso Brown
—	DF	CMR	Alain Eyenga

== Current technical staff ==
Position	Name
Head coach	(India) Ishfaq Ahmed
Goalkeeping coach	(India) Mohammed Yusuf Ansari
Team manager	(India) Yasir Malik
Physio	(India) Dr. Sheikh Aamir

== Records and statistics ==
=== Overall records ===
As of 6 April 2025

Season	Division	Teams	Position	Avg. attendance	Super Cup	Durand Cup	AFC Champions League	AFC Cup
2016–17	I-League 2nd Division	12	Grp A-3rd	600	Did not exist	Group stage	Did not qualify ▼	Did not qualify ▼
2017–18	I-League 2nd Division	18	1st	2,108	Did not participate	Did not participate ▼	Did not qualify ▼	Did not qualify ▼
2018–19	I-League	11	3rd	9,246	RO16	Did not participate ▼	Did not qualify ▼	Did not qualify ▼
2019–20	I-League	11	4th	9,034	Did not participate ▼	Semi-finals	Did not qualify ▼	Did not qualify ▼
2020–21	I-League	11	5th	🔒 Closed Doors ▼	Did not participate ▼	Did not participate ▼	Did not qualify ▼	Did not qualify ▼
2021–22	I-League	13	12th	🔒 Closed Doors ▼	Did not participate ▼	Did not participate ▼	Did not qualify ▼	Did not qualify ▼
2022–23	I-League	12	5th	2,859	Qualifiers	Did not participate ▼	Did not qualify ▼	Did not qualify ▼
2023–24	I-League	13	5th	3,499	Did not participate ▼	Did not participate ▼	Did not qualify ▼	Did not qualify ▼
2024–25	I-League	12	3rd	4,620	Did not participate ▼	Did not participate ▼	Did not qualify ▼	Did not qualify ▼

=== Season by season ===
As of 6 April 2025

⭐	Top scorer in division
🇮🇳	Top Indian scorer in division

Season	League									Finals	Top scorer(s)	
Season	Division	Pld	W	D	L	GF	GA	Pts	Pos	Finals	Player(s)	Goals
2016–17	I-League 2nd Division	6	3	0	3	7	8	9	Grp A-3rd	—	(Ivory Coast) Lago Dogbo	4
2017–18	I-League 2nd Division	13	8	5	0	23	14	29	Champions	—	(Ivory Coast) Bernard Kouassi (India) Atinder Mani (India) Ritwik Das (India) Danish Farooq (India) Ifham Tariq Mir	4
2018–19	I-League	20	10	7	3	25	14	37	3rd	—	(Scotland) Mason Robertson (Ivory Coast) Gnohere Krizo (Ghana) Abednego Tetteh	4
2019–20	I-League	15	6	4	5	16	14	22	4th	—	(Scotland) Mason Robertson	6
2020–21	I-League	15	5	6	4	23	17	21	5th	—	(Scotland) Mason Robertson (Nigeria) Lukman Adefemi	6
2021–22	I-League	17	2	8	7	23	31	14	12th	—	(Scotland) Mason Robertson	9
2022–23	I-League	22	9	7	6	27	25	34	5th	—	(India) Samuel Kynshi	6 🇮🇳
2023–24	I-League	24	11	7	6	36	19	40	5th	—	(Ivory Coast) Gnohere Krizo	12
2024–25	I-League	22	10	7	5	31	25	37	3rd	—	(Brazil) Paulo Cézar	7

=== Managerial record ===
As of 6 April 2025

Name	Nationality	From	To	P	W	D	L	GF	GA	Win%	Ref.
David Robertson	Scotland	2016	2022	70	34	20	16	96	64	48.57	
Mehrajuddin Wadoo	India	2022	2023	14	4	4	6	10	15	28.57	
Gifton Noel-Williams	England	2023	2023	8	5	3	0	17	10	62.50	
Ishfaq Ahmed	India	2023	till date	46	21	14	11	67	44	45.65	

== Notable players ==
=== Past and present internationals ===
The following Real Kashmir players have been capped at international level for their respective countries. Years in brackets indicate their spells at the club.

- (Syria) Taha Dyab (2018)
- (Zambia) Aaron Katebe (2018–2020)
- (Pakistan) Kashif Siddiqi (2019)
- (Tibet) Tenzin Samdup (2019–2020)
- (Afghanistan) Zohib Islam Amiri (2021)
- (Afghanistan) Masih Saighani (2021)
- (Ghana) Moro Lamine (2022–2023)
- (Tajikistan) Nozim Babadjanov (2022–2023)
- (Tajikistan) Nuriddin Davronov (2023)
- (Syria) Shaher Shaheen (2023–2024)
- (Uganda) Henry Kisekka (2024)
- (Cameroon) Aminou Bouba (2024–)

=== Other noted player(s) ===
- (Scotland) (United States) Mason Robertson (2018–2022), IFA Shield top scorer with Real Kashmir (Chuni Goswami Memorial Award) in 2020

== Other departments ==
=== Football (women's) ===
In September 2020, Real Kashmir FC launched women's development initiative named She Power Programme, in collaboration with Delhi Public School, for U-14 and U-10 girls teams. Senior team was announced in August 2021.

=== Futsal (men's) ===
The futsal section of Real Kashmir has participated in the inaugural edition of Futsal Club Championship, in which they failed to reach the knock-out stages.

The team previously clinched the state Futsal Championship title for the 1st time in September 2021, defeating Downtown Heroes by 3–1, which was organized by Jammu & Kashmir Football Association.

=== Football (youth men's) ===
Real Kashmir has been operating U13, U15 and U18 youth teams. Their U15 team took part in Hero U15 I-League. U18 team of the club competed in final round of the 2018–19 Indian Elite League. U17 team later went on to participate in 2022–23 U-17 Youth Cup. The U15 team participated in Nike Premier Cup.

== Honours ==
=== League ===
- I-League
  - Third place (2): 2018–19, 2024–25
- I-League 2nd Division
  - Champions (1): 2017–18

=== Cup ===
- IFA Shield
  - Winners (2): 2020, 2021
- J&K Invitational Cup
  - Winners (1): 2018

=== Award ===
- IFA Shield Fair Play Award (Ronny Roy Memorial Trophy): 2020

== Affiliated club ==
The following club was affiliated with Real Kashmir FC:

- (England) Oxford United FC (2020–2021)

== In popular culture ==
=== Worldwide attention ===
Real Kashmir have received international acclaim following their participation in a BBC Scotland documentary named "Real Kashmir FC" that followed the team and their Scottish manager David Robertson, which won the best 'Single Documentary' category at the British Academy Film and Television Arts (BAFTA) or BAFTA Film Awards Scotland. It additionally won at the UK "Broadcast Awards" for best documentary, and the best documentary and best director for Greg Clark at the Rotterdam European Sports Awards. A follow-up documentary "Return to Real Kashmir FC" was then made and given a 4 star review in The Guardian. The documentaries were also broadcast on Fox Sports in the US.

=== Global partnerships ===
On 22 October 2018, Adidas India announced its official partnership with Real Kashmir Football Club, the first football team from the Kashmir valley to qualify for the country's top tier I-League.

"Through sport, we have the power to change lives and the Real Kashmir team is a great example of this. Real Kashmir and its players have shown dedication and perseverance under difficult circumstances and we are proud to support them as they create history."

— Dave Thomas, MD of Adidas India, expressed on a positive future with Real Kashmir FC.

Beginning with the 2018–19 I-league season, Adidas became the official kit partner for the club. Also, beyond kit sponsorship, Adidas India aims at redefining the 'Real' Kashmir through the lens of sports and becoming a proponent of changing lives in Kashmir through football. The club is also affiliated to the Football for Peace, a non-governmental organisation headquartered in London. Real Kashmir also took part in Football for Peace global conference at the Queen Elizabeth Olympic Park in London, as an ambassador from India.

=== SonyLIV Series ===
On 14 September 2025, Indian OTT service SonyLIV released a teaser trailer for a series called Real Kashmir Football Club, depicting the story of the club's foundation. The released on 9th December 2025.

== See also ==
- List of football clubs in India
- Sports in Jammu and Kashmir

== Footnotes ==
1. Represented Tibet national football team in CONIFA tournaments internationally.
2. Fourth oldest football tournament, organized by the IFA (W.B.), and played between the local clubs of West Bengal and other invited ones.
3. Title shared with Minerva Punjab FC.
