= Jammu and Kashmir Premier Football League =

Football league in India

J&K Premier Football League
- Organising body: Jammu and Kashmir Football Association
- Country: India
- Divisions: 5
- Number of clubs: 8
- Level on pyramid: 5
- Promotion to: I-League 3
- Relegation to: J&K Super Division
- Current champions: J&K Bank
- Broadcaster(s): SportsCast India (YouTube)

The Jammu and Kashmir Premier Football League, also known as the Jammu and Kashmir Premier Division and the Srinagar Premier League, is the top state-level football league in the Indian state of Jammu and Kashmir, conducted by the Jammu and Kashmir Football Association (JKFA) and the J&K Sports Council.

== History ==
The sport was controlled by the Kashmir Olympic Association (KOA) as the governing body of football. In 1964, the Jammu & Kashmir Football Association was formed which took over the reins from KOA and established itself as the apex body in J&K. The Premier Division is the top tier of the state football league. The two bottom-placed teams get relegated to the Super Division. The A-Division is the third tier, while the fourth-tier is the B-Division. The inaugural season kicked off on 12 July 2021, with 8 teams competing for the maiden title and qualification for the I-League 2nd Division.

== League structure ==
There are four divisions in the league under the Jammu & Kashmir Football Association (JKFA), with the J&K Premier Division being the top-most league, followed by three lower tiers.

Jammu and Kashmir Football League
| Tier | Division |
|---|---|
| I _{(5 on Indian Football pyramid)} | Jammu and Kashmir Premier Division |
| II _{(6 on Indian Football pyramid)} | Srinagar Premier Division |
| III _{(7 on Indian Football pyramid)} | Srinagar Super Division |
| IV _{(8 on Indian Football pyramid)} | Srinagar A Division |

== Clubs ==
| Club | Town or city |
|---|---|
| FC Ganderbal | Ganderbal |
| J&K Bank Football Club | Srinagar |
| Almuqeet FC | Srinagar |
| North All United FC | Srinagar |
| Downtown Heroes FC | Srinagar |
| Arco FC | Srinagar |
| Star Kashmir FC | Srinagar |
| Kashmir Avengers FC | Srinagar |
| AG's Office XI | Srinagar |
| Kashmir Elegants FC | Srinagar |
| City Gates FC | Srinagar |

== Champions ==
=== J&K Premier Football League ===
| Year | Champion | Ref |
|---|---|---|
| 2017 | J&K Bank | |
| 2020 | J&K Bank | |
| 2021 | J&K Bank | |

== See also ==
- Almuqeet FC
