= TRC Turf Ground =

Football stadium located in Srinagar, Jammu and Kashmir, India

TRC Synthetic Turf Ground
- Interactive map of TRC Synthetic Turf Ground
- Full name: Synthetic Turf Football Stadium
- Location: Srinagar, Indian Administered Jammu & Kashmir
- Coordinates: 34°4′27.18″N 74°49′39.39″E
- Owner: Jammu & Kashmir Football Association
- Capacity: 10,000
- Surface: Astro turf
- Scoreboard: Yes

Construction
- Built: 2014; 12 years ago
- Renovated: 2015; 11 years ago

Tenants
- Lonestar Kashmir; Real Kashmir; JKFA Professional League

TRC Turf Ground is a football stadium located in Srinagar, in Jammu and Kashmir, India. Owned by Jammu & Kashmir Football Association, It is currently the home ground of Real Kashmir and most JKFA Professional League teams.

== History ==
The stadium was made at the cost of 4.5 crore (45 million) rupees and unveiled in September 2014 by then Chief Minister, Omar Abdullah. In 2017, the government and sports minister Imran Raza Ansari approved high mast flood lighting system to allow night matches. The first tournament was organised in 2015 namely Football Fanatics Knockout Tournament by Fanatics Group in collaboration with Jammu & Kashmir Football Association

== Tenants ==
Since 2015, the ground is being used in the I-League 2nd Division as the home ground for Lonestar Kashmir FC, and I-League for Real Kashmir FC. It has also been used for hosting JKFA Professional League matches.

== See also ==
- Sports in Jammu and Kashmir
