= Football for Peace =

Football for Peace is a non-governmental organisation (NGO) with its headquarters in London and supported by the United Nations Office on Sport for Development and Peace. It was co-founded internationally in 2013 by English-born Pakistani footballer Kashif Siddiqi and Chilean FIFA legend Elias Figueroa. The Movement uses soft power as a diplomatic tool to build resilient communities and to foster understanding.

== History ==
Originally started by Figueroa in 2006 as a campaign known as Futbol Por la Paz in South America. Siddiqi became the co-founder of Football for Peace Global in 2013 and in the same year, the concept made the transition from "campaign" to implementing NGO status with its international incorporation. The initiative was based on what had been achieved in the Americas, and brought to Europe, Asia, the Middle East, Africa and the Far East. The charities programmes are based in London, Chile, India and Liberia.

In 2016, charity ambassadors Pele and Ronaldinho visited London for the inaugural Diplomatic Football Peace Ball. The event was hosted by HRH Prince Ali Bin Al Hussein, as a patron member of the charity.

In 2018, the charity launched a campaign called Football Saves Lives which was supported by HRH Prince William, Duke of Cambridge, Mesut Ozil, Bacary Sagna, Carlton Cole, Mathieu Flamini, Mamadou Sakho, Avram Grant, Louis Saha whom visited the London programme.

During the same year co founder – Kashif Siddiqi was invited to Liberia to meet with football icon and President George Weah to discuss charity programmes around Football Diplomacy.

Premier League club, AFC Bournemouth Chairman Jeff Mostyn, joined the charity as an adviser to the board and ambassador. Mostyn is also a FA Council member.

== Football Diplomacy process ==
In 2015, Football for Peace Global created a Football Diplomacy peace process which is inclusive of peace matches, legacy projects known as "City for Peace" and sports diplomacy toolkits influencing social change. The process was intended to focus on community integration, reducing tensions between different groups and creating dialogue between nations.

=== Peace process lobbying ===
Football for Peace hosted Joko Widodo, 7th president of Indonesia in East London to showcase the peace process on 20 April 2016. He was accompanied by the British government officials where they met 60 youngsters from Newham, London and three Football for Peace ambassadors from Birmingham, who participated in the day-long workshop at Chobham Academy, Newham.

At the event, the NGO showcased educational football diplomacy toolkits which included youth leadership programs in bringing together youths from different backgrounds, religions and ethnicities.

In October 2016, co-founder of Football for Peace, Kashif Siddiqi was invited to meet Pope Francis and launch the first "Sport at the service of Humanity" at a press conference, which was organised by the Pontifical Council for Culture under the leadership of Cardinal Gianfranco Ravasi at the Vatican and welcomed the presence of faith leaders. Siddiqi spoke on the Global Peace Process and the role sport has to unite.

== Peace matches and Cities for Peace ==
=== Peace Match 2015 ===
On 8 September 2015, the first international peace match was hosted with the Royal Navy in bringing together Great Britain and Afghanistan. It marked the end of war against the Taliban group in Afghanistan and promoted reconciliation between the nations. It was a five aside peace match, which involved members of the Afghanistan national team and Team Great Britain playing together in the same team against a Footballers for Peace side at the old Royal Naval college in London Greenwich.

The unified Afghanistan and Great Britain was led by former Premier League manager Harry Redknapp, who defeated the Footballers for Peace side in front of a crowd, which included Prince Ali bin al-Hussein of Jordan.

=== World Record Peace Match 2016 ===
In June 2017, a World Record match was played as part of Equal Playing Field“ Altitude Football Project”, in partnership with Football for Peace. Together the organisations seek to challenge and create understanding around the inequalities women face internationally. Over 30 women from six continents met in Tanzania to raise awareness of equality in sport. After climbing Mount Kilimanjaro, the women played the highest-altitude match ever approved by FIFA, at 5,429 meters — a Guinness World Record

=== City for Peace 2015 ===
In December 2015, HRH Prince William, The Duke of Cambridge and Mr Wilfried Lemke The United Nations Secretary-General's Special Adviser on Sport for Development and Peace attended Birmingham for peace project and recognised the young peace ambassadors in the city. The project was based in Birmingham's Saltley Academy and was intended to bring young children from different faith and cultural backgrounds together after Operation Trojan Horse in 2014.

=== City for Peace 2016 ===
In January 2016, a women's empowerment program was launched in Kozhikode, a coastal city in the south Indian state of Kerala with Brazilian football legend Ronaldinho Gaucho announced an ambassador. He said, "Football has the power to unite the people. It has given me an opportunity and taught me universal values of Friendship and Unity. I am supporting the work carried by Football for Peace Global and proud to be the Guest of Honour of 2016 Sait Nagjee Trophy tournament and becoming a footballer for peace".

Football for Peace worked with Sait Nagjee Trophy Tournament, which is one of the most prestigious tournaments held in Kozhikode. It was the first edition of the tournament in 21 years and the 2016 edition saw clubs from Ukraine, Germany, Brazil, England and Republic of Ireland take part, along with the Argentina U23 side.

FC Dnipro Reserves won the tournament, while Atlético Paranaense Reserves finished as the runners-up in a tournament that was held between 5 and 21 February 2016.

Working with the 2016 Sait Nagjee Trophy Tournament and Kozhikode District Football Association, the organisations cooperated to involve teams from differing nations in tournaments.

After the tournament, Football for Peace delivered a legacy programme dedicated to the female youth of different areas in Kerala, which was intended to allow them to promote empowerment, cultural exchange and peace between various communities.

=== City for Peace 2017 ===
In December 2017, the programme was initiated in Luton, England as the town has faced far right extremism issues. A partnership approach between Bedfordshire FA, Luton Town FC Community Trust, Luton Borough Council and Football for Peace joined to enable young people to work together within different communities to create greater mutual understanding and respect, developing personal skills in the process.

=== City for Peace 2018 ===
In 2018, international city for Peace programmes launched in India and Liberia. The launch was at the Sport is GREAT event with the Premier league in partnership with the UK Foreign office and supported by Deputy British Ambassador to India, Crispin Simon. Bollywood actor Ranveer Singh and Manchester United legend Nemanja Vidic were also present in Mumbai in support.

During the same year the charity announced its plans to work alongside the Liberia Sports ministry to make Monrovia a city for peace. The initiative was announced in July making it first on the African continent. At the news conference, Youth and Sports Minister Zeogar Wilson was present and said "The initiative will benefit young people in the country, as many of them will gain knowledge in training that will be provided. The government will work with the organization in ensuring that the rest of Africa gain from the program. Meanwhile, lots of Liberian high school students in the central Monrovia area have expressed joy over plans to launch the program in Liberia".

== Structure ==
The Football for Peace organisation is based on three main structures: the executive board, the Steering Committee, the Footballers for Peace Council, the NGO is directed by the three structures and governed by Hogan Lovells, a multinational law firm co-headquartered in London and Washington, D.C.
