= White card (digital campaign) =

The White Card (#WhiteCard) is a worldwide digital campaign created by Peace and Sport in 2015 to celebrate International Day of Sport for Development and Peace which takes place each year on April the 6th. Holding up a White Card, just like a referee, is an action meant to symbolize the positive power of sport. In contrast with the red card, which signifies the most serious offense in sport, the White Card is a gesture of inclusion, equity and peace.

== Origin ==
‘White Card’ takes its name from ‘Carton Blanc’, a highly acclaimed photo exhibition by Maud Bernos. The international organization Peace and Sport commissioned these photographs to highlight the faces of children in conflict and post-conflict zones and their daily sport activity. The photographer captured how these children manage to transform an otherwise sombre existence into magic, making playing fields out of abandoned and post-conflict zones. The exhibition highlighted how sport can contribute to create spaces for equity, inclusion, human development and light up the road to peace.

Following the success of the photo exhibition, in 2014 Peace and Sport encouraged sports bodies, international and national Olympic Committees, governments, athletes, sporting clubs, academic institutions and civil society organisations to endorse the positive values of sport on social media by posting pictures holding a White Card in the framework of the International Day of Sport for Development and Peace on April6. Since 2015, the #WhiteCard digital campaign has reached more than 171 people on social media.

== Digital campaign ==
The #WhiteCard is a worldwide digital campaign created by Peace and Sport that promotes the positive and constructive values of sport. Athletes, international federations, heads of states and government as well as the sport world in general are invited to take a picture raising a white card and using the hashtag #WhiteCard to show their support to the peace-through-sport movement.

The 2018 edition of the campaign reached 90 million people on social media with endorsements from athletes including Yohan Blake, Didier Drogba and Rony Lopes.

== Meaning ==
Brandishing a White Card, just like a referee, identifies the holder with the sport-for-development-and-peace movement and expresses their support for using sport as a tool for social inclusion, equity and peace. Holding, displaying, or sponsoring a white card signifies that the person, organization or business cares and upholds sport as a tool for development and peace.
