= Peace and Sport =

Organization based in Monaco

- Location: Monaco
- Fields: Peace, sport, development
- Founder and President: Joël Bouzou
- Vice President: Didier Drogba
- Key people: H.S.H. Prince Albert II of Monaco, Champions for Peace
- Website: http://www.peace-sport.org

Peace and Sport, also known as the Organisation for Peace and Sport (French: Organisation pour la Paix par le Sport) is a sports organisations based in Monaco under the patronage of Prince Albert II of Monaco.

Ivorian footballer Didier Drogba became the organisation's Vice President after retiring from professional football in late 2018.

Argentine footballer Lionel Messi is a recipient of Peace and Sport's Champions for Peace Award.

== Field actions ==
Since its creation in 2007, Peace and Sport has developed 12 field programs in 13 countries. The organization works with local project leaders (governments, NGOs, National Olympic Committees, and sports federations) in areas affected by extreme poverty, the consequences of conflicts, and an absence of social cohesion. These partnerships aim to develop programs that use sport to address social issues within communities.

Peace and Sport field programs
Active Programs				Completed Programs			
Name of the program	Country	Date of creation	End date	Name of the program	Country	Date of creation	End date
Live Together	Jordan	2017	-	Sport, an educational and integration tool for the Malagasy youth.	Madagascar	2017	2017
Sports workshops	France	2016	-	Living together through sport.	France	2014	2015
Friendship Games	RD Congo, Burundi, Rwanda	2007	-	Sport, a key tool for strengthening national unity in Mali.	Mali	2014	2015
African Great Lakes	DR Congo, Burundi, Rwanda	2007	-	Peace on the street!	France	2014	2014
				Using sport as a medium for conveying values in lawless areas.	Israel, Palestine	2011	2013
				Sport, a key tool for integration and socialization among Colombian youth.	Colombia	2009	2014
				Sport, a key tool for integration and socialization among Ivorian youth.	Ivory Coast	2008	2015
				Sport for peace and development.	Haiti	2008	2014
				Sport, a key tool for integration and socialization among East Timorese youth.	East Timor	2008	2014

As of 2018, Peace and Sport actively runs four programs in three locations: the African Great Lakes region, Za'atari Refugee Camp in Jordan and France. These programs include:

1. The "Friendship Games," an annual multi-sport event with peace-building activities that gathers youth from Rwanda, the Democratic Republic of Congo, and Burundi.
2. The "Live Together" program in the Za’atari refugee camp in Jordan, aims to create social cohesion through sport among refugees of different ages and genders.
3. The "Sports Workshops" program uses sports to foster social and professional integration in vulnerable communities.
4. The "African Great Lakes" program, which is supported by the National Olympic Committees, international sports federations, local authorities, and Champions for Peace, offers six training centers for sports and peace-building activities.

=== The "Act For What Matters" programs ===
In 2016, Peace and Sport launched a global program called "Act for What Matters". The program invites projects to collaborate with eight NGOs across all continents that are engaged in peace-building through sport. The initiative's stated goal is to develop bonds between international federations, NGOs, NOCs, and local authorities, helping them to maintain and develop sustainable Sport for Peace programs.

=== "Sport Simple" solutions ===
Peace and Sport created a "Sport simple" manual. According to the organization, Sport Simple activities are sporting activities in which the practice area, equipment, and rules are adapted to the environment in which they are carried out.

For example, World Rugby recognizes and promotes "touch rugby", an adapted version of rugby. Touch rugby uses adapted rules and principles that allow participants to play without contact.

== The Champions for Peace ==
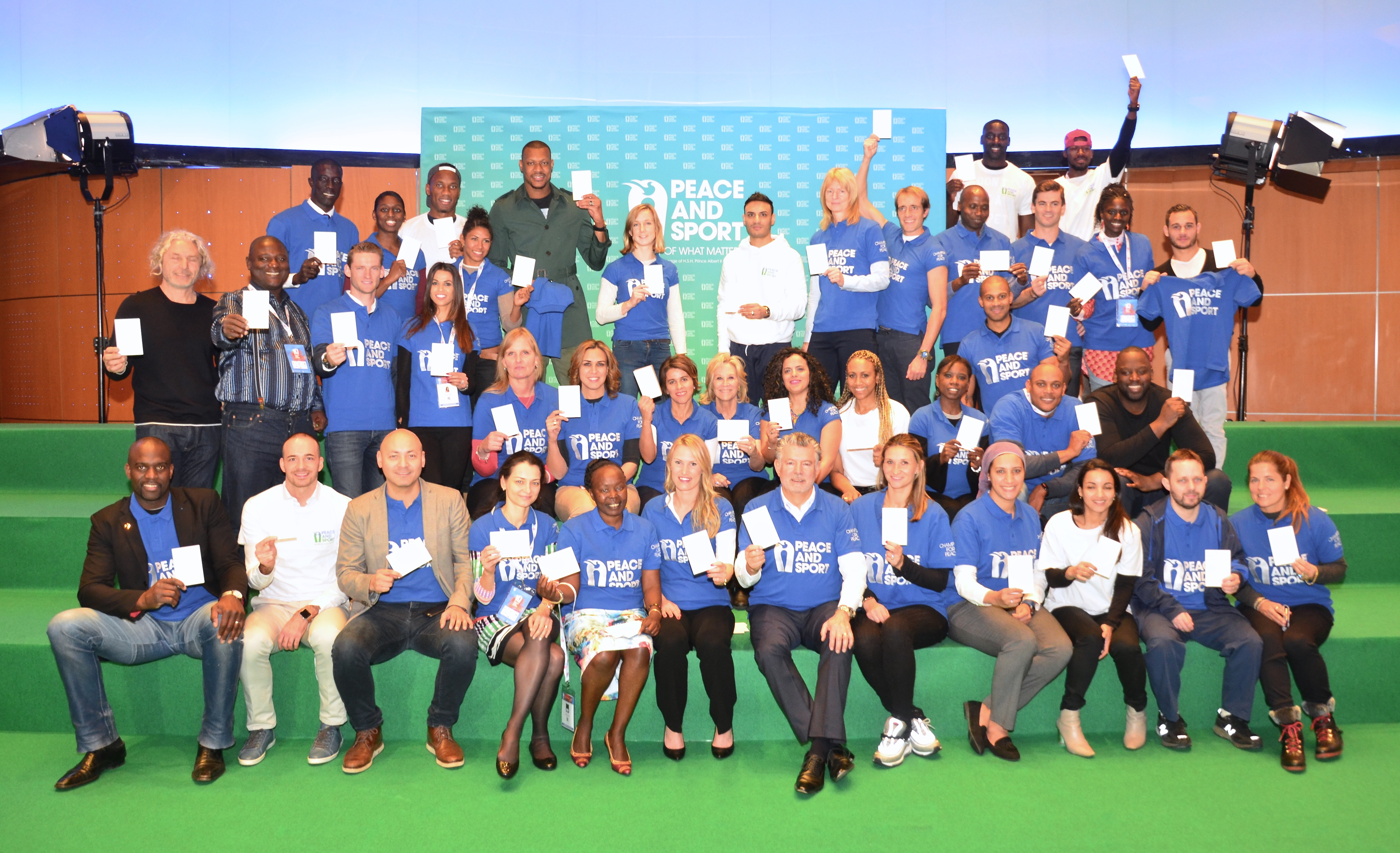
Champions for Peace during the Peace and Sport International Forum in 2017

The Champions for Peace are high-level international athletes who, according to Peace and Sport, support disadvantaged communities through sports. These athletes are part of the Champions for Peace club. The club aims to help the athletes to act and advocate for sports projects that promote peace and development. Lionel Messi became a Champion for Peace in December 2020.

Champions for Peace includes:

- Lionel Messi
- Didier Drogba
- Yohan Blake
- Novak Djokovic
- Christian Karembeu
- Philippe Gilbert
- Paula Radcliffe
- Isaac Angbo
- Serge Betsen
- Sergei Bubka
- Sébastien Chabal
- Guo Chuan
- Hicham El Guerrouj
- Rania Elwani
- Elías Figueroa
- Laura Flessel
- Dick Fosbury
- Laure Fournier
- Fredericks Frankie
- Christopher Froome
- Diana Gandega
- Pascal Gentil
- Tatiana Golovin
- Yelena Isinbaeva
- Wilson Kipketer
- Willy Kouyaté
- Sabri Lamouchi
- Tahl Leibovitz
- Sébastien Loeb
- Jonah Lomu
- Florence Masnada
- Felipe Massa
- Elana Meyer
- Aisam-ul-Haq Qureshi
- Kashif Siddiqi
- Sébastien Squillaci
- Helena Suková
- Samantha Murray
- Ryu Seung-min

== Peace and Sport Forum ==
=== The Forum ===
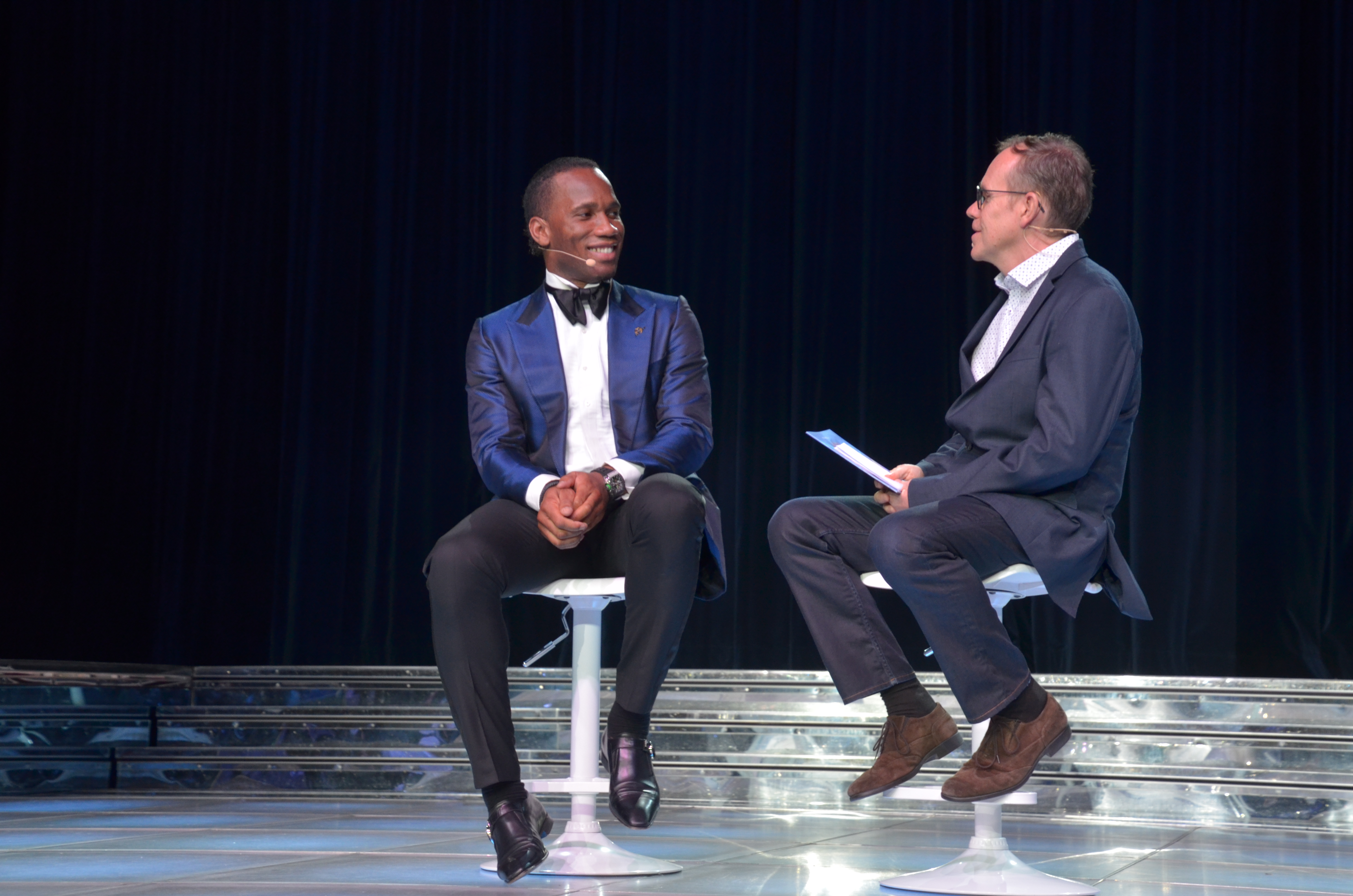
Didier Drogba during the Peace and Sport International Forum in 2017

The Peace and Sport International Forum is an annual event held in Monaco. According to the organization, it brings together key decision-makers, including heads of state, ministers, sports governing bodies, high-level athletes, international organizations, NGOs, academics, and Champions for Peace. It aims to identify solutions to global issues through sport. Past speakers have included Muhammad Yunus, Didier Drogba, and Christian Karembeu.

Since 2017, Peace and Sport has organized a biennial regional forum to highlight local peace-through-sport initiatives. The first edition was in Rhodes, Greece on October 18, 2018, co-organized with the South Aegean region.

== International Day of Sport for Development and Peace ==
=== April 6 web platform ===
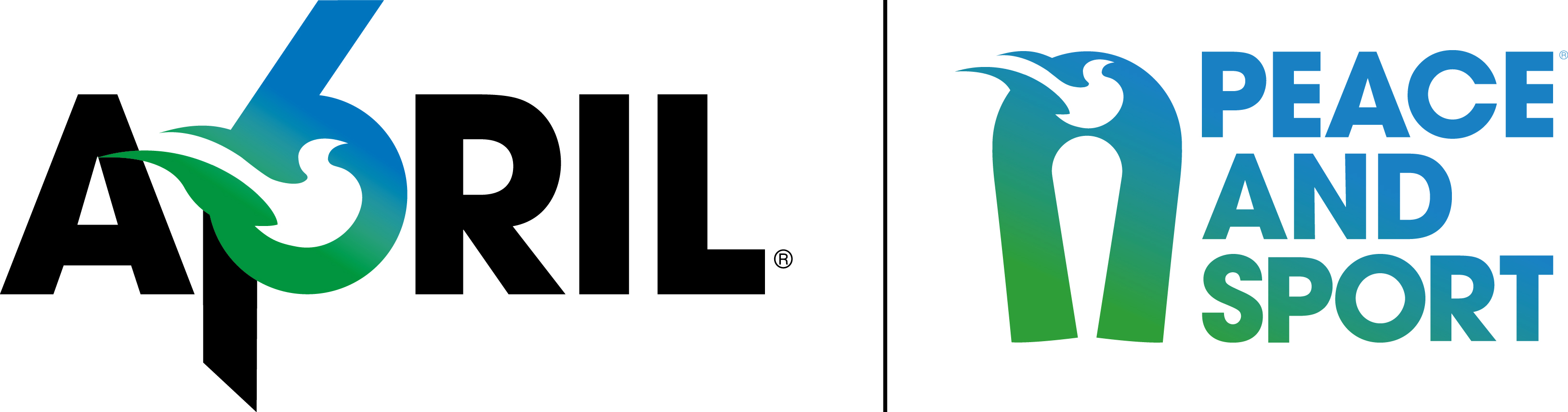

On 23 August 2013, the UN General Assembly declared April 6 as the International Day of Sport for Development and Peace (IDSDP).

This day is commemorated globally each year by international, regional, and national sports and development organizations.

Peace and Sport developed a web platform to highlight initiatives celebrating April 6.

== Significant actions ==
=== Rapprochement between North Korea and South Korea ===
In 2017, Peace and Sport, in cooperation with the International Ice Hockey Federation (IIHF) and the 2018 PyeongChang Organizing Committee brought together players from North and South Korea for a photo during the 2017 IIHF Ice Hockey Women's World Championship. Athletes posed holding a #WhiteCard.

In 2018, during the PyeongChang 2018 Olympic Winter Games, Peace and Sport and the IIHF brought together the joint North–South Korean women's hockey team for a photo.

=== UNFP / Peace and Sport Trophy ===
In 2015, the first UNFP (French National Union of Professional Soccer) / Peace and Sport trophy was awarded to the campaign "Soyons fiers de nos différences" (Be proud of our differences). The campaign was led in Ligue 1 and Ligue 2 on the initiative of the Ligue de football professionnel and the Panamboyz United.

=== Peace and Sport Documentary Prize at Sportel Awards Ceremony ===
At the Sportel Awards Ceremony, Peace and Sport awards the Peace and Sport Documentary Prize to a filmmaker whose video clip or movie emphasizes the positive role of sport in peace promotion.

In 2018, the prize was awarded to Jamillah Van der Hulst for her movie "Fighting for Life".

=== Monte-Carlo Fighting Trophy ===
In 2016, Peace and Sport partnered with the Monte-Carlo Fighting Trophy to raise funds for its field actions. The partnership was renewed in 2018.

=== "I Move For Peace" Fundraising ===
I Move for Peace is a program that enables sportspeople and aspiring sportspeople to support fundraising for its field programs.
