= Willi Lemke =

German football manager and UN official (1946–2024)

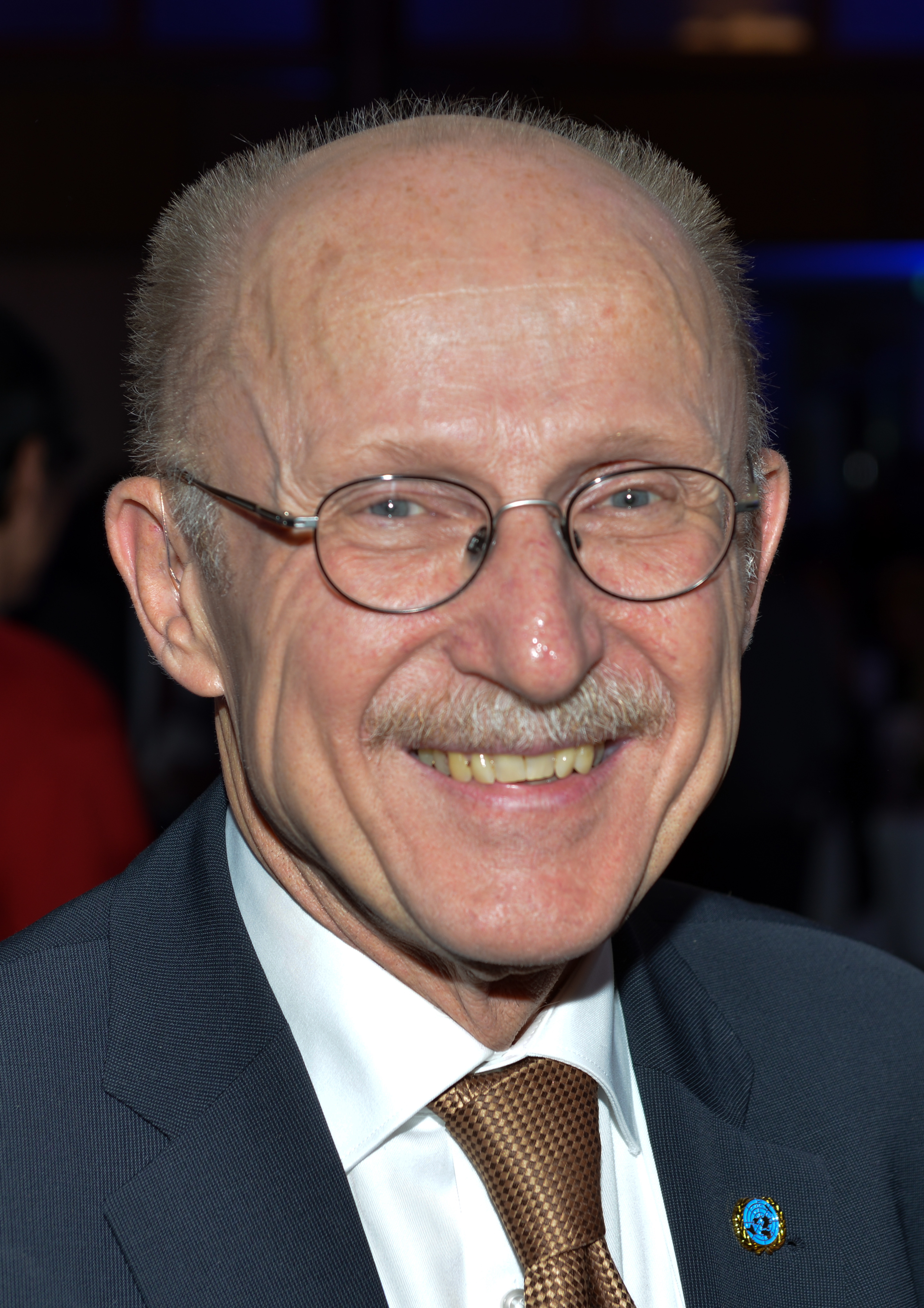
Lemke in 2014

Wilfried "Willi" Lemke (19 August 1946 – 12 August 2024) was a German football manager who later worked as a United Nations official. He served as United Nations Secretary-General’s Special Adviser on Sport for Development and Peace. He was appointed to the position by United Nations Secretary-General Ban Ki-moon on 18 March 2008.

== Biography ==
Lemke's parents originally came from Stettin. In 1945, his mother fled with two of his brothers to Neubrandenburg and then on to Pönitz, where he was born. He grew up in Hamburg. In 1965, he became German school champion with the 4x100 meter relay team of the Gymnasium Oberalster.

Lemke acquired extensive experience in sports and politics. Previously, he had acted as the Senator for the Interior and Sport and the Senator for Education and Science in the German State of Bremen. He had also managed Werder Bremen for 18 years, and had been in charge of fundraising and initiation of relief projects in the Commonwealth of Independent States and Eastern Europe.

As Special Adviser on Sport for Development and Peace, Lemke was responsible for heading the efforts of the UN system in promoting understanding and support for sport as an instrument for development and peace as well as encouraging dialogue, collaboration and partnership. Since the International Year of Sport and Physical Education in 2005, United Nations Member States have better understood the role of sport in development and peace in their national legislation and policies.

The United Nations Office on Sport for Development and Peace (UNOSDP) is based at the United Nations Office at Geneva (UNOG) and has a liaison office within the Department of Economic and Social Affairs at New York Headquarters. In August 2010, the UNOSDP was honoured by the Union of European Football Associations (UEFA) with the 2010 Monaco Charity Award.

Lemke obtained his degree in sport and educational sciences from Hamburg University. In September 2010, he was awarded the title of Honorary Professor at the University of Western Cape, South Africa. He was an ambassador for Peace and Sport, a Monaco-based international organization, committed to serving peace in the world through sport.

Lemke died of a cerebral haemorrhage in Bremen, on 12 August 2024, at the age of 77.
