= Mesut Özil =

German footballer (born 1988)

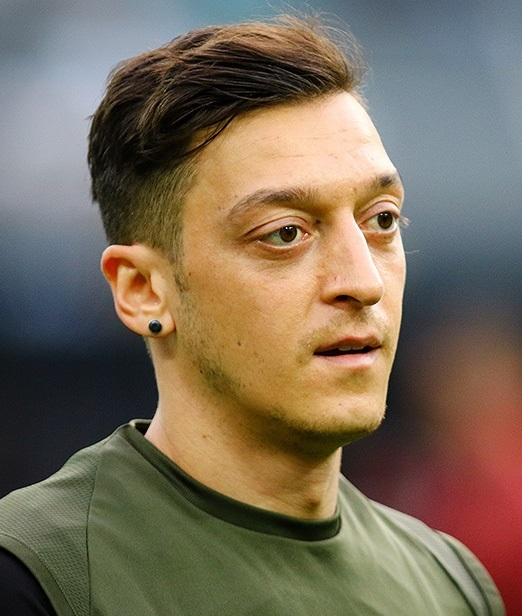
- Özil in 2019

Personal information
- Full name: Mesut Özil
- Date of birth: 15 October 1988 (age 38)
- Place of birth: Gelsenkirchen, West Germany
- Height: 1.80 m (5 ft 11 in)
- Position: Attacking midfielder

Youth career
- 1995–1998: Westfalia 04 Gelsenkirchen
- 1998–1999: Teutonia Schalke-Nord
- 1999–2000: Falke Gelsenkirchen
- 2000–2005: Rot-Weiss Essen
- 2005–2006: Schalke 04

Senior career*
Years	Team	Apps	(Gls)
2005	Schalke 04 II	1	(0)
2006–2008	Schalke 04	30	(0)
2008–2010	Werder Bremen	71	(13)
2010–2013	Real Madrid	105	(19)
2013–2021	Arsenal	184	(33)
2021–2022	Fenerbahçe	32	(8)
2022–2023	İstanbul Başakşehir	4	(0)
Total		427	(73)

International career
2006–2007	Germany U19	11	(4)
2007–2009	Germany U21	16	(5)
2009–2018	Germany	92	(23)
Medal record
Men's football
Representing Germany
FIFA World Cup
Winner	2014 Brazil	Team
Third place	2010 South Africa	Team
UEFA European Championship
Third place	2012 Poland-Ukraine	Team
UEFA European Under-21 Championship
Winner	2009 Sweden	Team
Personal details
Party	Justice and Development Party
Signature
- * Club domestic league appearances and goals

Mesut Özil (German pronunciation: [ˈmeːzut ˈøːzil], Turkish: [meˈsut œˈzil]; born 15 October 1988) is a German former professional footballer who played as an attacking midfielder. Known for his ball control, technical skills, creativity, passing skills, and vision, he is widely regarded as one of the best midfielders of his generation.

Born and raised in Gelsenkirchen, Özil began his senior club career playing for hometown club Schalke 04, before signing with Werder Bremen in 2008, aged 19. Özil established himself as one of Germany's most promising players at Werder Bremen, helping the club win the DFB-Pokal and reach the 2009 UEFA Cup final in his debut season. His performances earned him a move to Real Madrid in 2010. There, he won the 2010–11 Copa del Rey before helping the club win the 2011–12 La Liga title with a then-record 100 points. He was named in the UEFA Team of the Year in 2012 and 2013.

In 2013, Özil joined Arsenal for a fee of up to £42.5 million (€50 million), becoming the most expensive German player in history and Arsenal's record signing at the time. He made over 250 appearances for the club and helped end its nine-year trophy drought by winning the 2013–14 FA Cup, before adding two more FA Cups. In 2015–16, he recorded 19 assists in the Premier League, nearly matching the competition's single-season record, as Arsenal challenged for the league title. In 2021, Özil joined Fenerbahçe on a free transfer; after his contract with the club was terminated in 2022, he signed with İstanbul Başakşehir, before retiring in 2023.

A German international for over nine years, Özil holds the record for the most German national team Player of the Year awards (five). He made his senior debut for the Germany national team in 2009 at age 20, and appeared in five major tournaments. He was the top assist provider at the 2010 FIFA World Cup and UEFA Euro 2012, where he helped Germany twice reach the semi-final. Özil helped Germany win the 2014 FIFA World Cup, but retired from international competition in 2018, alleging what he saw as discrimination and disrespect by the German Football Association (DFB) and German media.

== Early life ==
Mesut Özil was born on 15 October 1988, in Gelsenkirchen, North Rhine-Westphalia, as a son of Turkish immigrants. His grandfather moved as a Gastarbeiter from Zonguldak, Turkey to West Germany. He played, at youth level, for various clubs in Gelsenkirchen between 1995 and 2000, before a five-year stint with Rot-Weiss Essen.

== Club career ==
=== Schalke 04 ===
In 2005, Özil moved to the youth system of Schalke 04. He was deployed a midfielder and wore 17 as his squad number, after starting as a playmaker and central attacking midfielder in the place of the suspended Lincoln in DFL-Ligapokal matches against Bayer Leverkusen and Bayern Munich. Upon making the first team at Schalke, he was described in the German press as "the next big thing". However, soon after declining an offer from Schalke 04, claiming that a yearly salary of €1.5 million would not be enough, he eventually fell out with club management and moved on to Werder Bremen in January 2008. This led to Mirko Slomka, the then-Schalke manager, claiming that Özil would not play another match for Schalke.

=== Werder Bremen ===
On 31 January 2008, Özil moved to Werder Bremen for a reported fee of €5 million, signing a contract with the German club until 30 June 2011. Other than Werder Bremen, Hannover 96 and VfB Stuttgart were reportedly interested as well in binding Özil to their respective clubs, however did not want to pay such a high transfer fee. After transferring to Werder Bremen, Özil got the jersey number 11. On 26 April 2008 (30th match day) Özil scored the go-ahead goal in the 33rd minute against Karlsruher SC, to put his team up 2–1, this was Özil's first Bundesliga goal. He played in twelve games throughout the second half of the season, six times playing in the starting formation, becoming second with Werder Bremen in the Bundesliga at the end of the 2007–08 season.

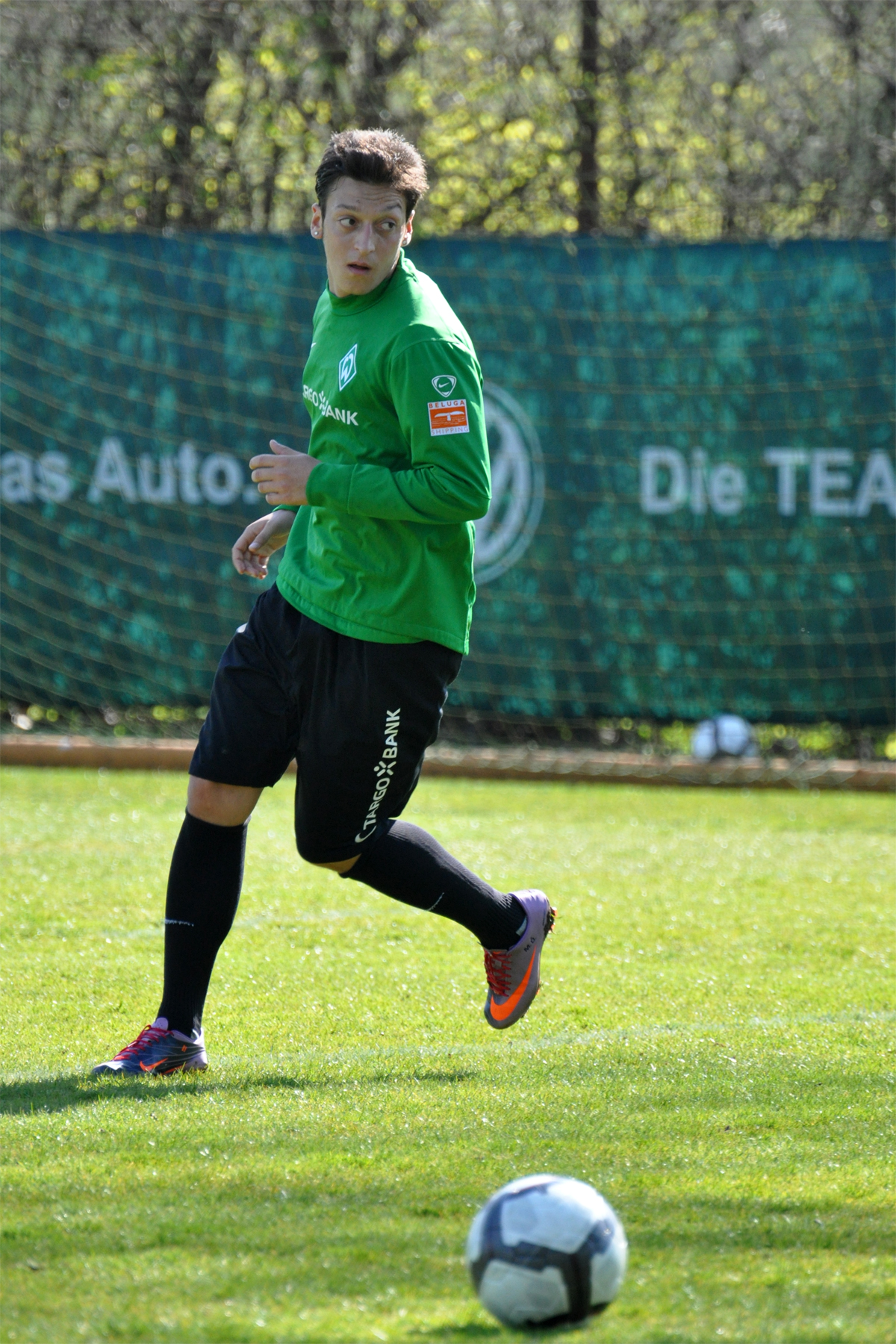
Özil with Werder Bremen in 2010

Although Bremen failed to get going in their 2008–09 Bundesliga season, eventually finishing a disappointing tenth, Özil made 3 goals and 15 assists in the league, as Werder Bremen finished tenth. He helped lead the North German club to the 2009 DFB-Pokal with the winning goal in a 1–0 victory over Bayer Leverkusen in Berlin. He also played regularly in European competition as Werder Bremen reached the final of the last UEFA Cup, where they lost to Shakhtar Donetsk of Ukraine.

In the 2009–10 season, Özil took over the playmaker role formerly occupied by Brazilian midfielder Diego, and was named the best player of the first half of the 2009–10 Bundesliga season. On 1 May 2010, the 33rd match day, Özil played his 100th Bundesliga game, scoring the 1–0 lead in a 2–0 win against his former club Schalke. Özil went on and led Werder Bremen to become third in the league and again to the DFB-Pokal final, however this time it was lost against Bayern Munich by 0–4. In his second season, Bremen finished a respectable third, with Özil contributing 9 goals and 17 assists in 31 league fixture appearances. During the 2009–10 season, Özil was also declared as the "best player of the first half of the season".

=== Real Madrid ===
==== 2010–11: Debut season, European assist leader ====
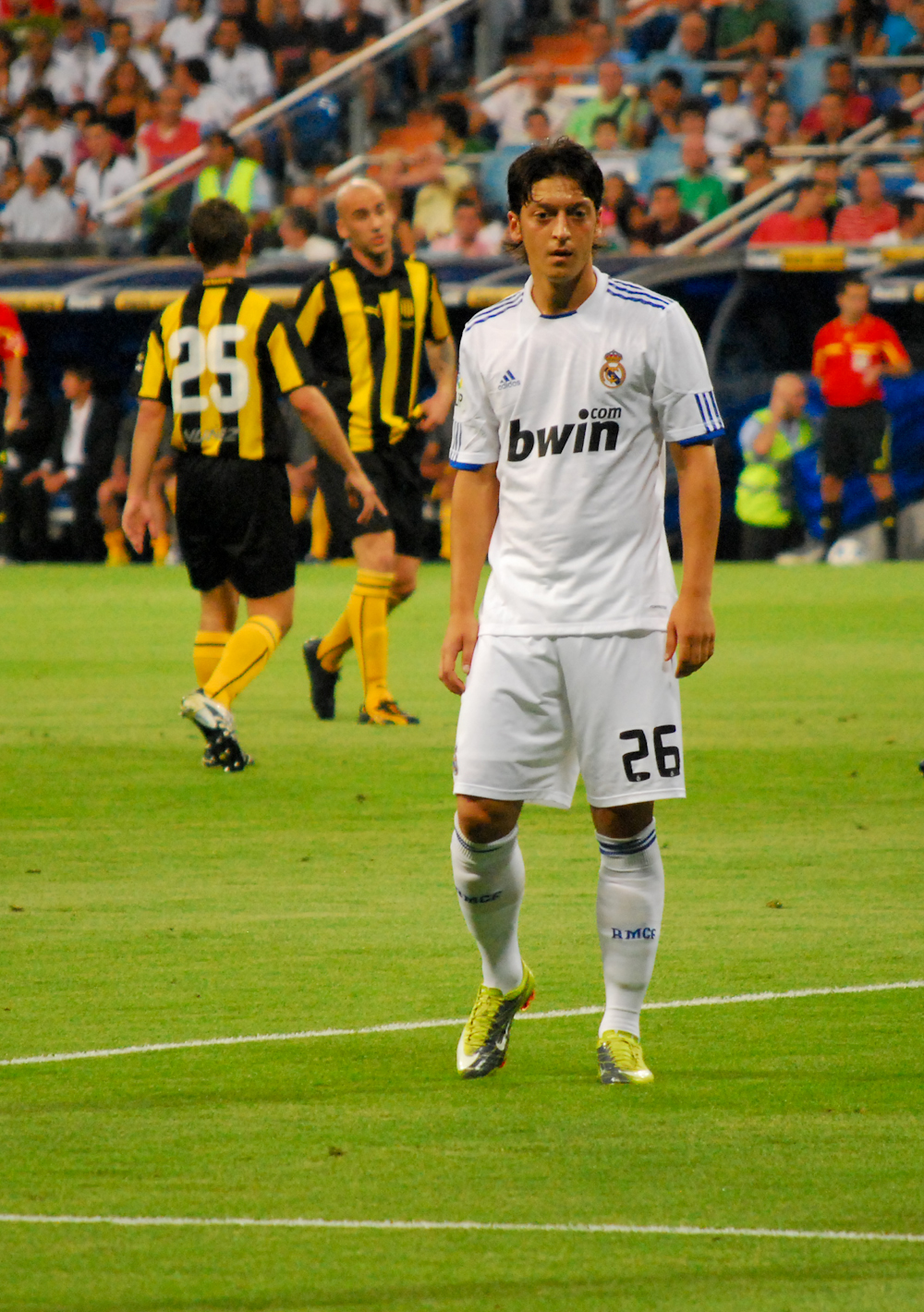
Özil playing for Real Madrid in 2010

Following his performances at the 2010 FIFA World Cup, Özil attracted interest from several leading European clubs. He was sought by teams like Barcelona, Arsenal and Real Madrid. English striker Wayne Rooney was one of the many admirers Özil had garnered with his performances in the World Cup, and had even asked Manchester United manager Sir Alex Ferguson to sign the German playmaker. There were reports claiming that a deal was struck for a transfer to Barcelona, but Werder Bremen denied the reports and on 17 August 2010, the team announced that they had reached an agreement with Real Madrid for Özil's transfer. The transfer fee is believed to have been in the region of €15 million. Upon signing, Özil said, "When the offer came in to join Real Madrid, there is no decision to make. Let's be honest – you don't refuse this club. I was in no rush to leave Werder Bremen, but this is one club you say yes to. They are an institution, a club with a fantastic history, stadium and squad full of world-class players. The prospect of performing at the Bernabéu is so awesome you jump straight in."

Özil made his debut on 22 August in a friendly match against Hércules, which Real Madrid won 3–1. His jersey numbers were changed often before the season started. He was given the number 26 in the pre-season and 19 for his debut. But following the transfer of Rafael van der Vaart to Tottenham Hotspur, he was given the vacant 23.

Özil was brought in to back up teammate Kaká, but due to the latter's surgery, Özil obtained a starting role. He then made his La Liga debut for Real Madrid as a substitute for Ángel Di María in the 62nd minute against Mallorca, which Real Madrid drew 0–0.

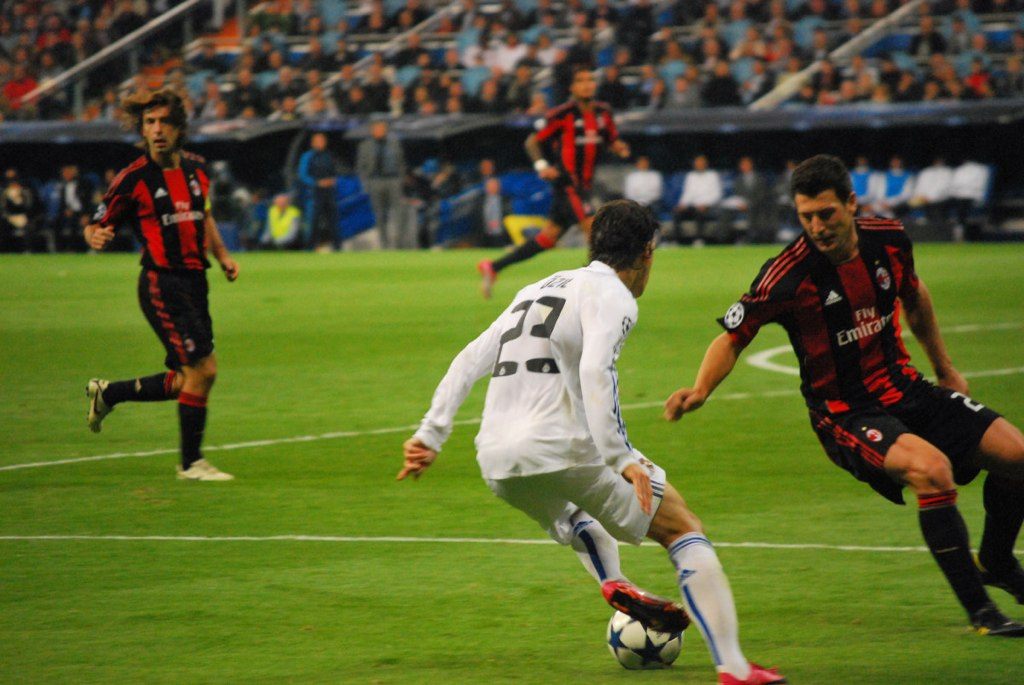
Özil taking on Daniele Bonera of Milan during the 2010–11 UEFA Champions League

He made his season debut in the Champions League on 15 September. He got his first assist with Real Madrid in the 74th minute against Ajax after he crossed for a Gonzalo Higuaín goal.

He walked off the pitch as a second-half substitute to standing ovations in his first two games as a starter at the Santiago Bernabéu Stadium. His first goal came in a league match against Deportivo de La Coruña on 3 October 2010, in a 6–1 victory. Özil's first Champions League goal with Real came in the 14th minute against Milan on 19 October 2010. On 22 December, he made his debut in the Copa del Rey, scoring once in an 8–0 victory over Levante.

He finished the season with 25 assists, the highest for any player in any major European competition that season. Özil's performances for Real Madrid during his first season were praised by media, fans and players.

==== 2011–12: La Liga win ====
Özil began wearing the number 10 shirt for Real Madrid in 2011–12, and continued to be used in an advanced playmaking role under manager José Mourinho. On 14 August 2011, Özil scored his first goal against Barcelona in El Clásico in the first leg of the 2011 Supercopa de España. On 17 August 2011, he was sent off in the last minute of the second leg of the 2011 Supercopa after an altercation with Barça forward David Villa. Özil expressed his desire to end his football days at the club in an interview with German magazine kicker, saying, "I'd like to end my career at Real Madrid. I know it will be difficult because I have many more years ahead of me and many younger and good players will also be out there, but I want to be part of that future. I know what I'm capable of, and I'm convinced, I'll stay at Real Madrid many years."

Özil was on the short-list of the FIFA Ballon d'Or award.

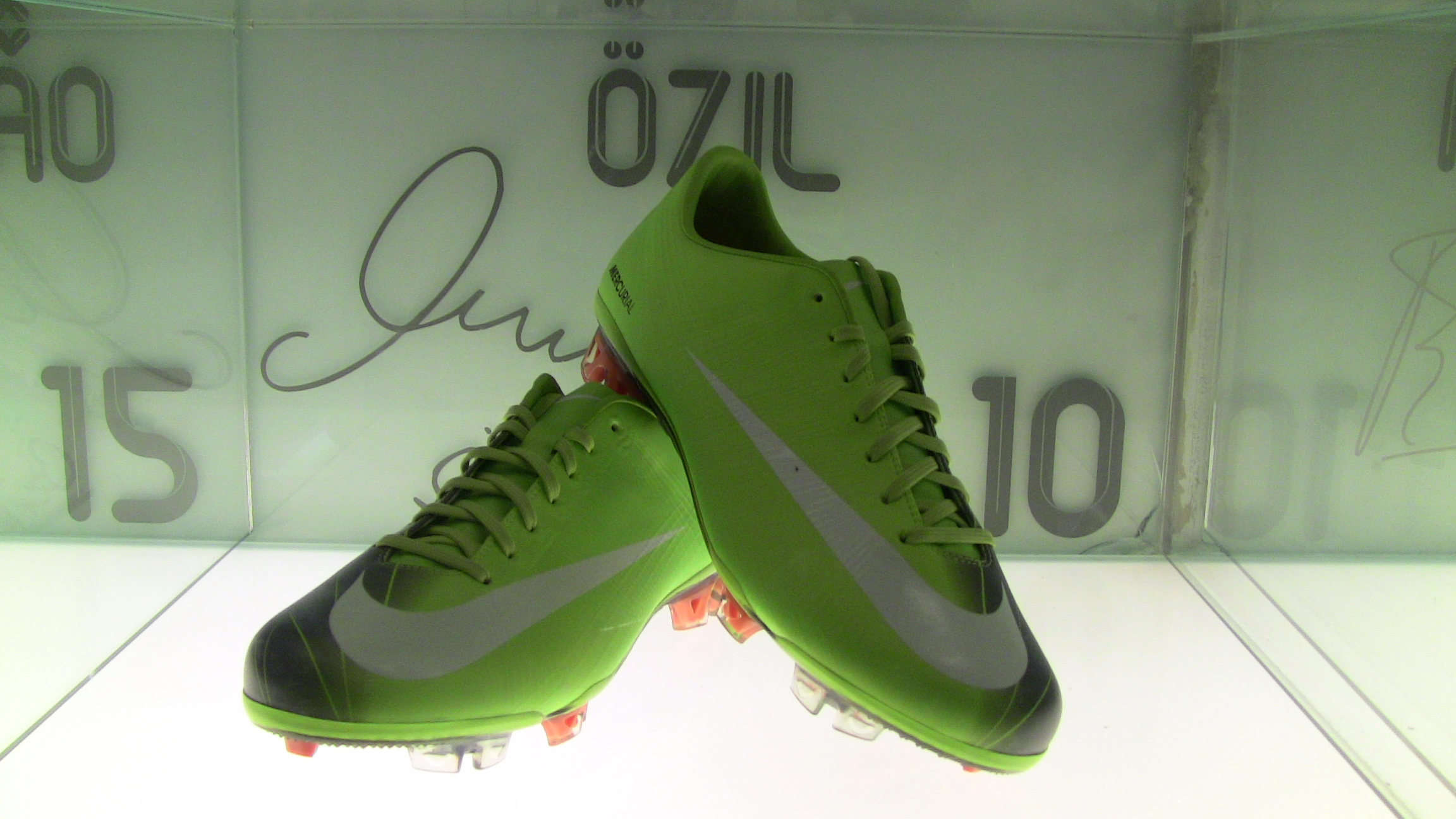
Özil's boots on display at the Santiago Bernabéu museum

He finished atop the La Liga assists chart, with 17 assists. On 2 May 2012, he helped Real Madrid to clinch a record 32nd La Liga title as he assisted Real's first goal and scored the second goal against Athletic Bilbao, which Real Madrid won 3–0. Eleven days later, Özil scored two goals in the final game of the regular season against Mallorca, once again consolidating his excellent performance with the club. The win made Real the first club in the Spanish top flight to ever reach 100 points in a single season. His performances for Real Madrid and the Germany national team led to a nomination for the UEFA Best Player in Europe Award; he finished tenth and was the youngest player in the top ten.

==== 2012–13: Third straight La Liga assist leader ====
With arrival of Luka Modrić before the start of the season, some in the media claimed Özil was unhappy at Real Madrid, but he later rejected such talk and claimed he was happy at the club and looking forward to competing for his place. After the start of the season, he added the Supercopa de España title to his honours. In league play, he provided an important assist to Cristiano Ronaldo who equalised in a 2–2 draw against Barcelona at Camp Nou. On 6 November, Özil scored a crucial 89th-minute free-kick to rescue a draw for Real Madrid and secure a point against Borussia Dortmund. He continued his fine form in the league as he scored another brace against Real Valladolid to rescue Real Madrid in a 3–2 win. He then went on to finish the season with 29 assists, although Real Madrid did not win any silverware except for the Supercopa de España, Özil's performance was praised. At the end of the season, Özil had 26 assists, more than any other player in the leagues.

=== Arsenal ===
On 2 September 2013, Özil agreed to join English side Arsenal. Both the fee paid for Özil as well as the contract duration were undisclosed, but they are believed to be around £42.5 million (€50 million) for a five-year deal. The transfer makes him the most expensive German football player of all time. Özil was assigned the number 11 shirt and the centre-attacking midfield role by the team. Contract leaks in January 2016, however, have revealed that the record fee was actually broken down to £37.4 million (€44 million) with a further £5.1 million (€6 million) split evenly over six years from July 2014, subject to Champions League qualification. A buy-back option also allows Real Madrid a 48-hour first option on Özil should Arsenal agree a sale for the playmaker to another Spanish club.

Özil said of the transfer, "At the weekend, I was certain I would stay at Real Madrid but afterwards I realised I did not have the faith from the coach or the bosses. I am a player who needs this faith and that is what I have felt from Arsenal, which is why I have joined." In Özil's first press conference, he said: "I would have come here for free, that wouldn't have been a problem." Özil additionally stated that Arsène Wenger played an important role in his decision: "When I spoke to Arsène Wenger on the phone, he was full of respect, and as a player, I need that." Several Real Madrid players were dissatisfied with Özil leaving the club, including Cristiano Ronaldo, who said, "He was the player who best knew my moves in front of goal ... I'm angry about Özil leaving."

==== 2013–14: Ending the trophy drought ====
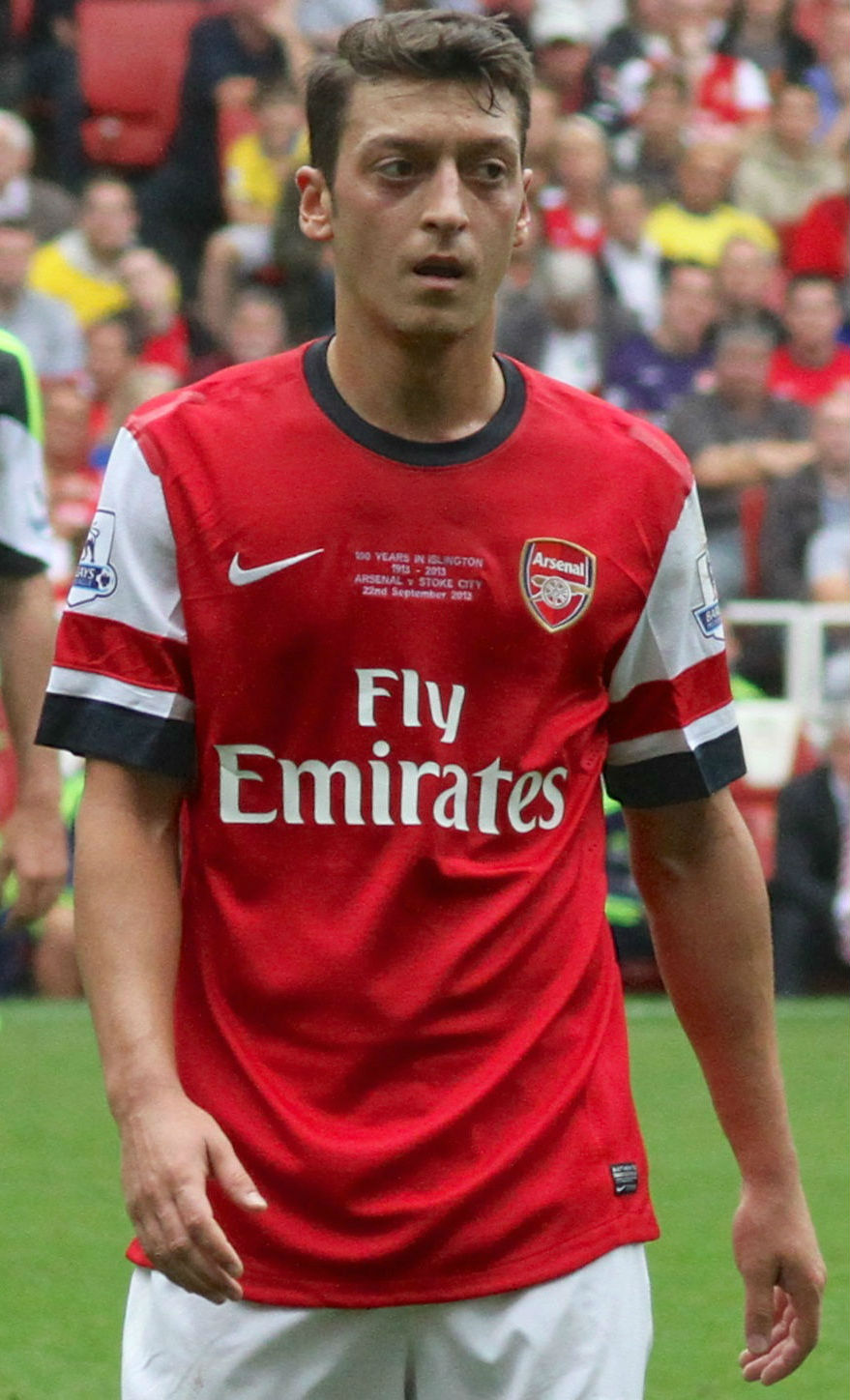
Özil playing for Arsenal in 2013

Özil made his debut for Arsenal in their league game away to Sunderland on 14 September 2013. He assisted Olivier Giroud's goal in the 11th minute of the match as they went on to win 3–1. Three days after that, he made his Champions League debut for Arsenal against Marseille. Just over three weeks after making his debut for Arsenal, he made his home debut against Stoke City in a 3–1 victory. He was involved in all three goals, with two assists and a free kick which was saved but fell into Aaron Ramsey's path. He scored his first goal for Arsenal with a controlled finish from a Ramsey cross in a 2–0 win against Napoli in the Champions League. On 19 October, he scored his first two Premier League goals during the 4–1 home win against Norwich City. Özil played in all six of Arsenal's games in November. The German playmaker provided the cross for Jack Wilshere's second goal against Marseille and gave further assists for Aaron Ramsey and Mathieu Flamini in the 3–0 win over Cardiff City. Özil missed the chance to score his fourth Arsenal goal when he saw his penalty in the win over Marseille saved by Steve Mandanda.

In October, Özil was again short-listed for the FIFA Ballon d'Or award, along with former teammate Cristiano Ronaldo. Özil was also featured on the UEFA Team of the Year. Özil began December with two goals in as many games against Hull City and Everton. A minor shoulder injury forced him out of the final game of December in a win against Newcastle United. After the 6–3 defeat at Manchester City in which he made another assist, Özil was involved in an altercation with teammate Per Mertesacker, who was angry with Özil's failure to thank the travelling supporters, an omission for which he subsequently apologised via Facebook.

Özil started four of Arsenal's six games in January. The playmaker missed Arsenal's victory over Cardiff City on New Year's Day with a shoulder injury before returning to make a late appearance from the bench against Tottenham Hotspur in the FA Cup. The 25-year-old produced a slide-rule pass for Lukas Podolski to score his first goal against Coventry City and provided the ball for Santi Cazorla's goal against Southampton at the end of the month to take his assist tally to 10.

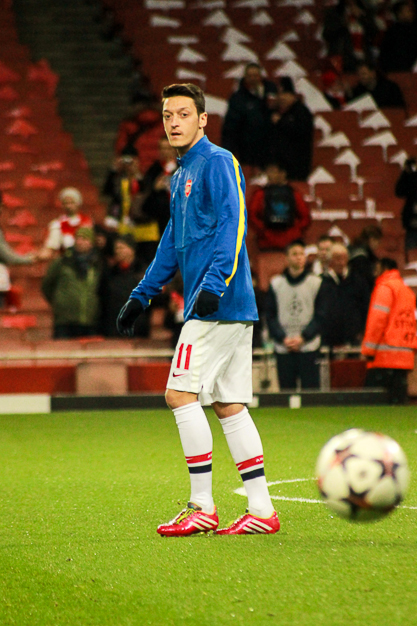
Özil warming up for Arsenal in 2014

February was a difficult month for Özil, as he struggled to reach the heights he showed in his first few months at the club. The German playmaker won a penalty against Bayern Munich in the Champions League knockout phase, but his spot-kick was saved by Manuel Neuer. Speaking before the draw with Manchester United, Arsène Wenger spoke about Özil, saying, "He has done well, he is adapting as well to the Premier League – we have seen it before [that it takes time]. I would not like to put too much pressure on him because he has been a top-class player until now. He did not have the best of games [at Liverpool] (a 5–1 loss, where Özil was the centre of attention due to a bad performance) but that can happen. He works very hard to adapt to the physical level of the Premier League and for me he is an exceptional player."

On 8 March, Özil scored his first goal of 2014 in a 4–1 FA Cup quarter-final win over Everton. After returning from injury, Özil started in Arsenal's second-leg Champions League last-16 match against Bayern Munich. He was substituted at half-time, and the reasoning behind it was that Özil had suffered a hamstring injury and will face a month out, missing key fixtures against Chelsea and Manchester City.

On 20 April, Özil returned to the Arsenal team in a 3–0 win against Hull City. He then returned to goalscoring form with Arsenal's second in their 3–0 win over Newcastle United, and then assisted Olivier Giroud's header. Manager Wenger praised Özil's impact upon his return, saying, "Mesut Özil is very important for the team. He's been missed while he's been injured. We've missed some very important players in an important period of the season. We're really pleased to have people like him back in the team and performing at the top level because that's what we need."

Özil played all three of Arsenal's remaining fixtures during the last month of his debut season in England. The German playmaker came off at half-time in extra-time of Arsenal's 2014 FA Cup Final victory over Hull at Wembley Stadium. Speaking before the FA Cup final, Per Mertesacker praised his compatriot's impact on the side during his first season in England. "You could see from the start that he is one of the best players in Europe", said Mertesacker. "His contributions and assists are vital for any club so we are happy to have him back." Özil completed his maiden season at Arsenal with 13 assists and seven goals in all competitions spanning a course of 40 games.

==== 2014–15: Second FA Cup victory ====
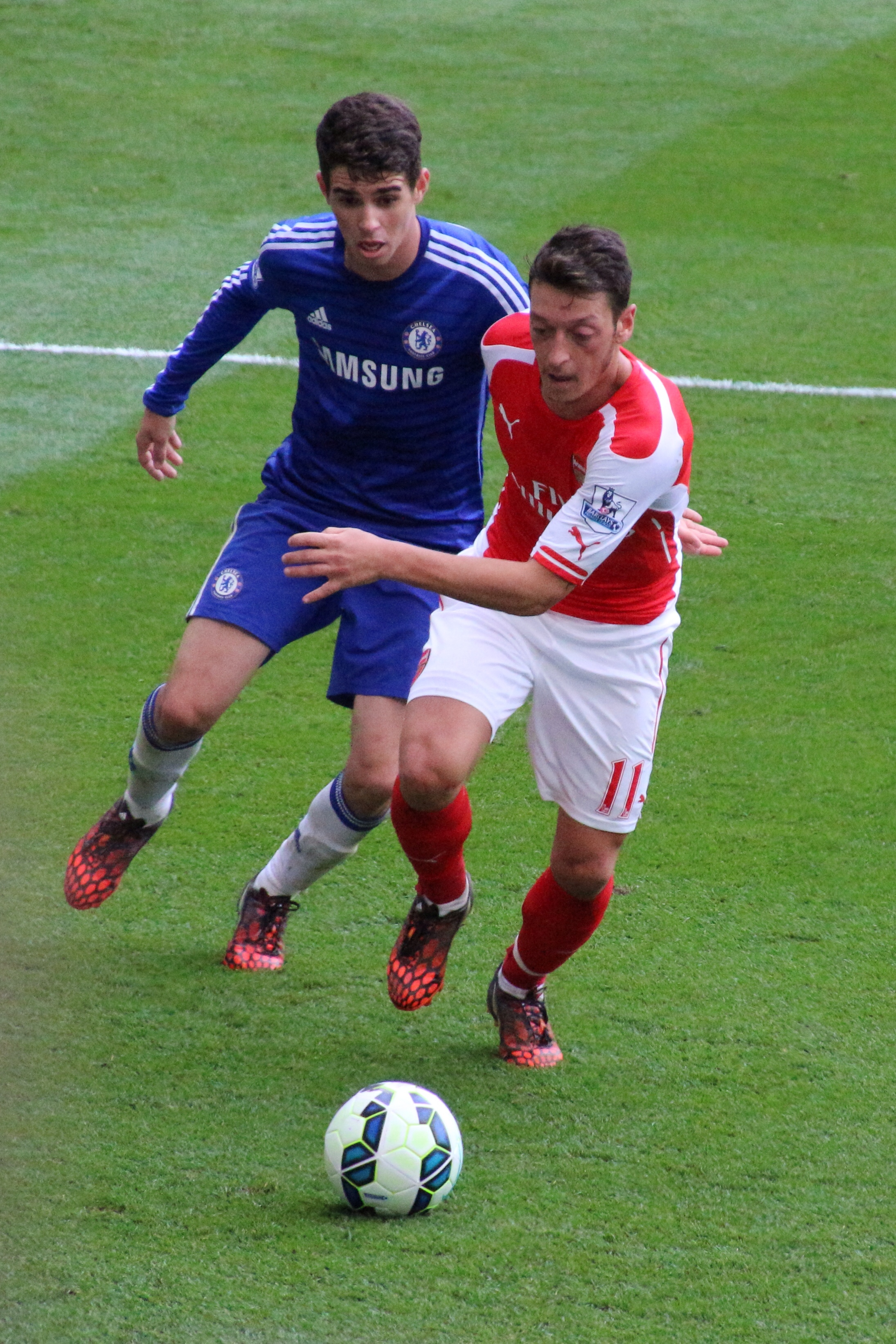
Özil playing for Arsenal in 2014

Özil returned to club training in the middle of August after participating in Germany's 2014 FIFA World Cup win in Brazil. On 23 August, Özil made his first appearance of the season in a 2–2 draw with Everton at Goodison Park. On 27 August, he played a part in Alexis Sánchez's winning goal in the second leg of the Champions League qualification play-off against Beşiktaş, playing a one-two with Jack Wilshere in the build-up to the goal. On 20 September, Özil opened the scoring and assisted Danny Welbeck in a 3–0 victory against Aston Villa at Villa Park. Özil featured in the three following games and started in Arsenal's Champions League group stage victory against Galatasaray, providing an assist for Alexis Sánchez in a 4–1 win. On 8 October, the DFB declared that Özil would be sidelined for between 10 and 12 weeks with a left knee injury obtained during a 2–0 defeat at Chelsea three days prior to the international break. The prognosis would rule him out of the remainder of Arsenal's Champions League group matches, as well as four international fixtures.

On 11 January 2015, Özil made his first appearance in three months as a 73rd-minute substitute in a 3–0 win against Stoke City. He scored on his return to the starting line-up in Arsenal's 3–2 win at Brighton & Hove Albion in the fourth round of the FA Cup on 25 January, latching onto a pass from Tomáš Rosický before scoring Arsenal's second goal. In his first Premier League start of the year, Özil scored once and provided an assist for Olivier Giroud as Arsenal beat Aston Villa 5–0 at home on 1 February. The following week, Özil scored the opening goal in the Gunners' 2–1 North London derby defeat to Tottenham at White Hart Lane. He continued his good form by creating both goals in a 2–1 victory over Leicester City on 10 February. He also grabbed a pair of assists two weeks later, in a 2–0 victory against Everton. On 4 April, he scored the second goal for his team in a 4–1 win over Liverpool, which would be his final goal of the season. After a 3–1 win over Hull, manager Arsène Wenger praised him by saying, "Overall his influence was very strong."

Özil followed up this goal with two assists for Alexis Sánchez in a 2–1 win against Reading in the 2014–15 FA Cup semi-final on 18 April. Özil started in the 2015 FA Cup Final as Arsenal beat Aston Villa 4–0 on 30 May, concluding his second season at Arsenal with five goals and nine assists, in 33 appearances across all competitions, and back-to-back FA Cups.

==== 2015–16: Premier League assist leader ====
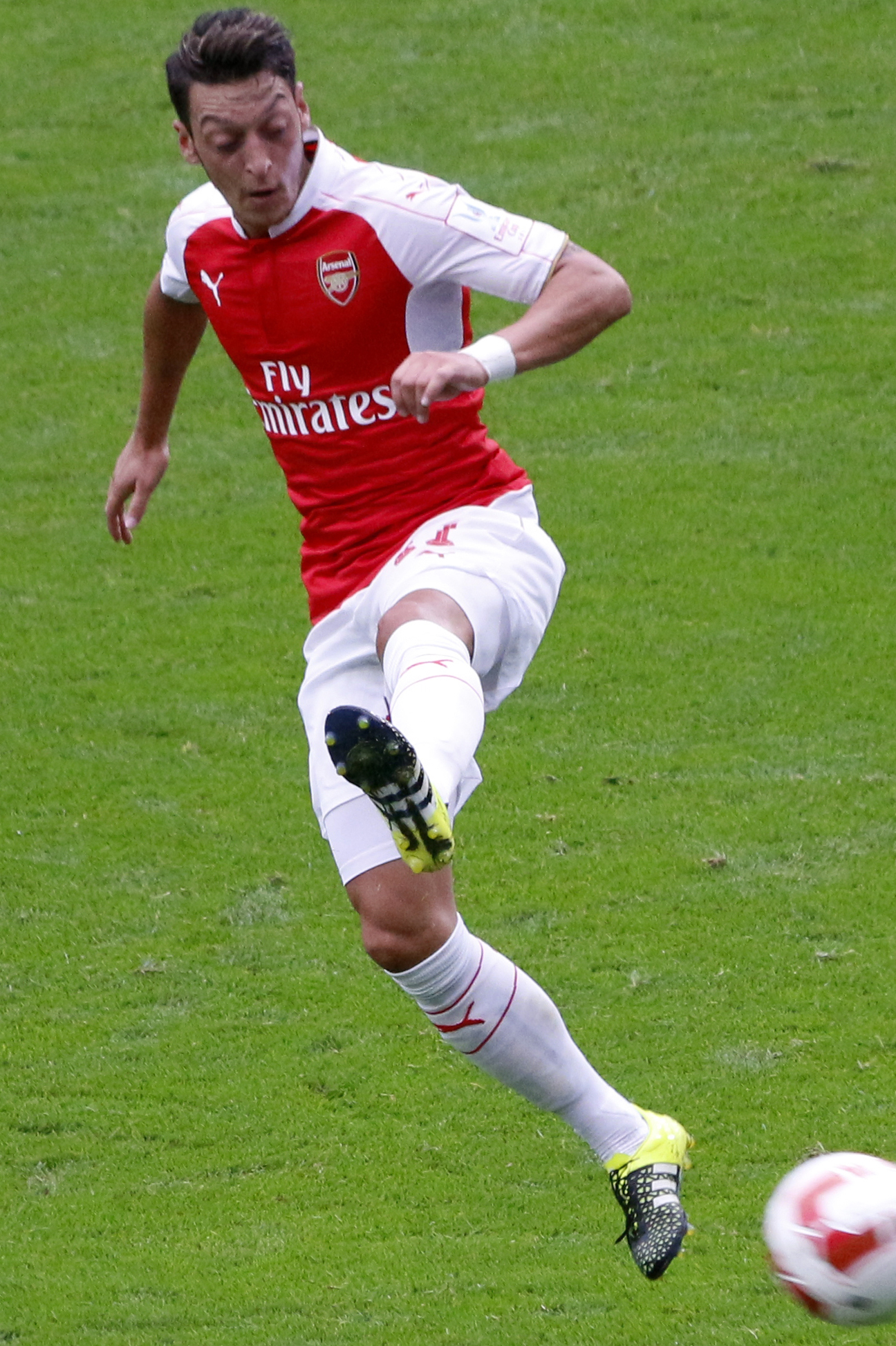
Özil playing for Arsenal in 2015

After scoring during a pre-season game against Lyon, Özil received praise from his manager, with Wenger calling for him to have his best season yet in Arsenal colours. On 2 August 2015, Özil started for Arsenal in the 2015 FA Community Shield, where the Gunners beat league champions Chelsea 1–0 at Wembley Stadium. A week later, he made his first appearance of the Premier League season in Arsenal's 2–0 opening day defeat to West Ham United.

Özil scored his first goal of the 2015–16 season in a 3–0 home victory over Manchester United on 4 October. He had earlier assisted Alexis Sánchez to give the Gunners the lead in the sixth minute of the match. Özil was named man of the match in a 3–0 win at Watford's Vicarage Road on 17 October, supplying assists for Sánchez and Olivier Giroud. On 20 October, Özil scored his first Champions League goal of the season in Arsenal's 2–0 group stage home win over Bayern Munich.

He set a new Premier League record being the first player to assist in six consecutive matches when setting up Kieran Gibbs' for 1–1 in the derby versus Tottenham on 8 November 2015. He then extended that run to seven straight games with an assist against West Bromwich Albion, before scoring his second Champions League goal of the season in a three-goal victory at home to Dinamo Zagreb. He then scored for the second game in a row when he clipped in the opener in a 1–1 draw at Norwich. Özil provided four assists in the next three games, against Aston Villa, Manchester City and Sunderland, helping his team win all three matches. On 28 December 2015, Özil assisted the first goal and scored the second in a 2–0 win against AFC Bournemouth, creating nine scoring chances in total – the most in a single Premier League game by any player during the season.

On 24 January 2016, Özil played his 100th game for the Gunners in a 1–0 home defeat against Chelsea in the Premier League. The next Premier League game against Southampton at home on 2 February saw Özil creating 10 chances – beating the previous record, nine, created and held by him during the season. The match ended 0–0, and Arsenal dropped to fourth place after failing to score in three consecutive Premier League games. He then ended the Gunners' barren goal-scoring run in the Premier League with the opener against Bournemouth in a 2–0 away win on 7 February. Özil delivered his 17th assist in the Premier League from a free kick for Danny Welbeck to head in the winner deep into stoppage time as Arsenal came from behind to beat league leaders Leicester City 2–1 on 14 February.

After a 2–0 home defeat to Barcelona in the Champions League, Özil scored and assisted in a 3–2 defeat at Old Trafford to Manchester United as the Gunners lost further ground in the title race. Özil started in the 2–1 Watford in the FA Cup, where he set up Danny Welbeck for Arsenal's consolation goal with a backheel assist, and three days later in a 3–1 defeat to Barcelona in the Champions League as Arsenal were eliminated from both competitions in March.

Özil assisted Olivier Giroud's second goal in Arsenal's last Premier League match of the season against Aston Villa in a 4–0 home victory as the Gunners finished second ahead of fierce rivals, Tottenham Hotspur. That was Özil's 19th assist of the season in the league, a record only beaten by Thierry Henry with 20 in 2002–03 in Premier League history. Özil ended his third season at Arsenal with eight goals and 20 assists in all club competitions, which won him the Arsenal Player of the Season award.

==== 2016–17: Third FA Cup win ====
Özil missed Arsenal's opening day defeat to Liverpool, after his excursions at UEFA Euro 2016 meant he was not match-fit. However, he started his first game of the new season for his club in a 1–3 away win at Watford on 28 August, in which he scored his first goal of the campaign, heading in an Alexis Sánchez cross to score Arsenal's third of the afternoon. His second arrived just under a month later, netting a controlled volley in a 3–0 home win against Chelsea. On 15 October, Özil again scored a volley at home, as he recorded the decider in a tense 3–2 win against Swansea. Four days later, in a Champions League home game against Ludogorets Razgrad, Özil assisted Theo Walcott's goal, and scored his first professional career hat-trick, which was concluded after again volleying as Arsenal went on to win 6–0. On 29 October, he registered his first league assist of the season, after Giroud latched onto a corner to score the club's third in a 1–4 win against Sunderland. For his performances, he was awarded the club's Player of the Month award for the month of October.

Özil began November by recording his third assist, which came in the North London derby, and was given after his free kick was turned into the net by opposing defender Kevin Wimmer. Özil would then record Arsenal's Goal of the Season on 19 October, as he scored a remarkable solo winner in a nervy 2–3 away win against Ludogorets, which capped a resilient comeback after Arsenal were down by two goals in the opening 15 minutes. He scored the opener in a 1–5 away win against West Ham United on 3 December, and assisted the fourth goal. He repeated his set-up exploits three days later in a Champions League win against Basel, feeding Iwobi from the left for the fourth. He then scored a header in a win against Stoke City a week later, before rounding out the year, Özil assisted the only goal in a home victory against West Brom on 26 December. He registered his first assist of 2017 after placing his corner directly in the path of teammate Mustafi, who headed past Tom Heaton in a 2–1 win against Burnley. Despite an impressive first half to the campaign, Özil would then struggle with muscular problems, and was absent for a number of Arsenal's games.

He returned to fitness to star in a 2–2 draw against Manchester City on 2 April, where he assisted the equaliser. He would also break his four-month cold goalless spell after placing a controlled finish in a 3–0 win against West Ham United three days later, while he also assisted the second. He then scored another volley just under two weeks later, in a win against Middlesbrough. He then recorded his ninth assist on 10 May, where he set up Sánchez's opener. In the last three league gameweeks, he scored his final goal of the season against Stoke City, while his final two assists arrived in the following two weeks, against both Sunderland and Everton. Despite the club missing out on the league and Champions League qualification, Özil concluded his fourth season at the club with 12 goals and 13 assists in 44 appearances across all competitions, and featured heavily as he won the 2017 FA Cup.

==== 2017–19: Contract extension, UEFA Europa League runner-up ====
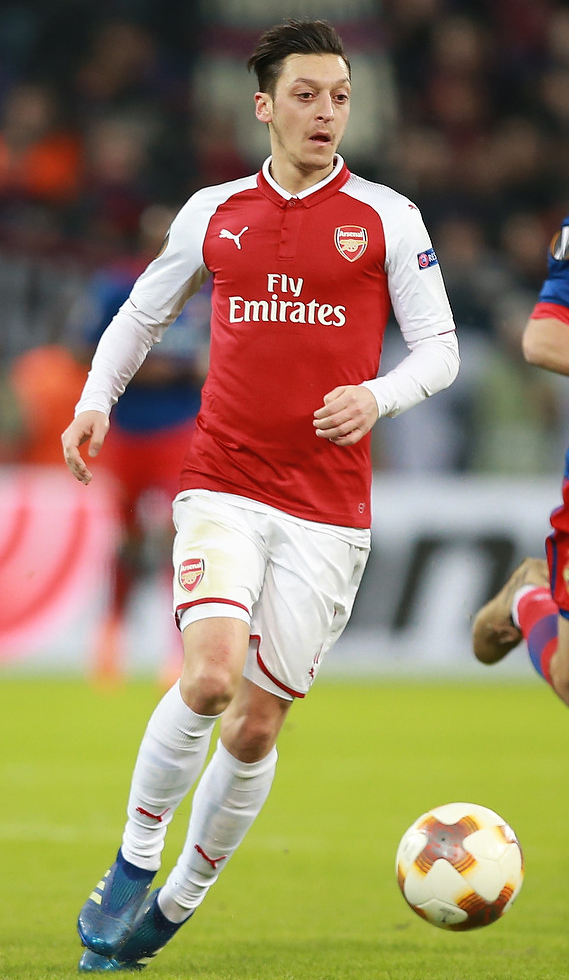
Özil playing for Arsenal in 2018

Özil entered the 2017–18 season in the final year of his contract, and struggled initially, featuring sparsely with knee inflammation. He recorded a goal and an assist in a 5–2 victory over Everton on 22 October, and recorded another assist a week later, against Swansea City. His performance in the North London Derby on 18 November was heavily praised, after creating the first goal. He then scored and assisted twice in a 5–0 victory over Huddersfield to close out November, and scored in back-to-back weeks to close out December, first in a victory against West Ham, and then a scintillating scooped finish in a 3–3 draw against Liverpool.

After entering January with six months remaining on his contract, which would allow him to engage in pre-contract negotiations with any club, Özil assisted in a win over Crystal Palace, and also assisted in a loss in the reverse fixture against Swansea City on 30 January. A day later, he re-signed with the club on a three-year extension, keeping him contracted until 2021. It was also reported his salary more than doubled to £350,000 per week, making him the highest-paid player in Arsenal's history.

On 15 February, Özil scored in the first knockout round of the Europa League, netting calmly against Östersund. He then gained a brace of assists in the next round, against Milan. On 11 March, he recorded his 50th Premier League assist in a 3–0 win over Watford. In doing so, he became the fastest player to reach 50 assists in the competition, in his 141st appearance, breaking the record previously held by Eric Cantona. He continued his exploits in the Europa League by recording a hat-trick of assists in a victory against CSKA Moscow on 5 April. Persistent injuries limited his involvement in the club's final games of the season, however, Özil ended his fifth season at Arsenal with 5 goals and 13 assists in 35 appearances, and featured heavily in the club's later run and appearance in the 2018 EFL Cup Final.

Following the departure of Jack Wilshere, Özil returned to wearing the number 10, for the 2018–19 season. He was also named one of Arsenal's vice-captains. Özil scored his first goal of the season in Arsenal's 2–1 away win over Newcastle on 15 September, and netted again a week later in a 4–2 victory in the UEFA Europa League over Vorskla Poltava. He scored his third goal of the season in a victory over Watford on 28 September. On 22 October, he captained Arsenal for the first time in a 3–1 comeback win over Leicester City. Özil was involved in all three goals, scoring the first, and adding two assists in a man-of-the-match performance.

His involvement in the first-team began to falter due to a mix of injuries and a dip in form, but he returned to assist the only goal in a victory in the Europa League against Qarabag on 12 December. Özil was also publicly left out of the first team squad on a few occasions, leading to speculation he could depart Arsenal in the January transfer window. However, no move materialised, and his form continued to suffer, with rumours also circulating of Özil having a fractured relationship with head coach Unai Emery, who publicly questioned the player's motivation. He returned to goalscoring form in a 5–1 home victory against Bournemouth, where he also registered an assist, on 27 February, while his last statistical contribution came in the form of a goal in a loss against Crystal Palace in April. As a result, he registered one of his worst statistical campaigns as an Arsenal player, netting six goals and providing four assists.

Despite this, Özil featured in the 2019 UEFA Europa League Final, where, after Arsenal's defeat, Özil reportedly vocalised his frustration with Emery in front of his teammates, and continued to be linked with a move away from north London.

==== 2019–21: Limited gametime, squad exclusion ====
Özil was given additional time off to start the 2019–20 season, after being the victim of an attempted robbery. He made his season debut on 15 September, in a 2–2 draw against Watford. He was controversially left out of the following Premier League games against Aston Villa and Manchester United, and registered his second appearance of the season in an EFL Cup tie against Nottingham Forest, where he again failed to complete 90 minutes. Özil made his third appearance of the season in an EFL Cup tie defeat against Liverpool in October. He registered his first assist against Liverpool in the same competition at the end of October, and subsequently returning to the league starting lineup for November; he registered his first league assist in a 2–1 home defeat to Brighton & Hove Albion in December.

Özil only completed 90 minutes once more in the league for the remainder of the campaign, scoring his first goal of the season in a 4–0 victory over Newcastle United on 16 February 2020. He registered his second league assist against West Ham United on 7 March, but did not feature for the club again following the resumption of competitive football after its suspension due to the COVID-19 pandemic. As a result, Özil registered his worst statistical season, as well making the lowest number of appearances in a campaign since the 2007–08 season. It was also reported Özil refused a voluntary 12.5% paycut amid the pandemic, doing so as the club "[lacked] information and [left] many questions unanswered" over their use of these wages.

Özil was left out of the match-day squads for the first matches of the 2020–21 season and was not included in the club's squad for the Europa League group stage. It was also later confirmed that Özil was omitted from Arsenal's 25-man Premier League squad, leaving him eligible only to play for Arsenal's U-23 squad. Özil released a statement on Twitter in which he said that he was "deeply disappointed" but would "continue fighting for [his] chance". Some had suggested Özil's omission from the squad was related to his criticism of the treatment of Uyghur Muslims in China, from which Arsenal publicly distanced themselves.

=== Fenerbahçe ===
"I am very excited because I was always a fan of Fenerbahçe. A dream has come true for me. That's why I'm very excited to wear the jersey. I hope I will be successful with my teammates. I hope everything will be fine. I wish the best."

— Mesut Özil,

On 27 January 2021, Özil moved to Turkish club Fenerbahçe. He joined as a free agent after his contract with Arsenal was terminated six months prematurely, with the player reportedly forgoing part of the £7 million (€7.9 million) owed to him by Arsenal. Although financial terms were undisclosed, Özil signed a three-and-a-half-year deal with Fenerbahçe worth a reported £4.5 million (€5 million) a season, and received a £2.6 million (€3 million) signing-on bonus.

Özil said he was "very excited" to be joining the club and would "wear the shirt with pride". Fenerbahçe had wanted to sign Özil for years, and chairman Ali Koç also commended the deal, noting they were unable to sign the player in 2019 due to financial concerns. Özil had stated a desire to represent Fenerbahçe, the team he supported as a child during his career, as well as play in Major League Soccer (MLS), with Özil also engaging in negotiations with D.C. United prior to signing for Fenerbahçe.

In his first season, Özil was assigned the number 67 jersey, in reference to the license plate of his ancestral town, Zonguldak, as his recognizable number 10, as well as his previous number 11, were occupied by Mbwana Samatta and Diego Perotti, respectively. On 2 February, he made his Süper Lig debut for Fenerbahçe as a substitute for Mame Thiam in the 77th minute against Hatayspor, which Fenerbahçe won 2–1. Özil missed eight games in his first season, from 4 March until 29 April, after rupturing ankle ligaments and contracting COVID-19. He recorded his first assist for the club on 11 May in a 2–1 loss against Sivasspor, as Fenerbahçe eventually finished third.

In his second season, Özil was assigned the number 10 jersey, his recognizable number. On 15 August, he scored his first goal for the club in a 1–0 away victory against Adana Demirspor, also captaining the team for the first time. On 16 September, he scored his first European goal for Fenerbahçe in a UEFA Europa League game against Eintracht Frankfurt. On 21 November, he scored an equaliser in the 31st minute, sprinting from the halfway line to the penalty area, against Galatasaray in the Intercontinental Derby, which Fenerbahçe won 2–1 at Nef Stadium.

On 24 March 2022, Fenerbahçe announced that he was excluded from squad, along with his teammate Ozan Tufan. Özil completed his second season at Fenerbahçe with nine goals and two assists in 26 games in all competitions. On 13 July, his contract with Fenerbahçe was mutually terminated.

=== İstanbul Başakşehir and retirement ===
On 14 July 2022, Özil signed a one-year contract with an option for an additional year with İstanbul Başakşehir. On 21 August 2022, he made his debut for İstanbul Başakşehir in a Süper Lig game against Kayserispor, as a substitute for Berkay Özcan in the 80th minute, which İstanbul Başakşehir won 2–0.

Özil left the club and announced his retirement from professional football on 22 March 2023, citing recurrent injuries. Özil made 427 top-flight appearances in his club career.

== International career ==
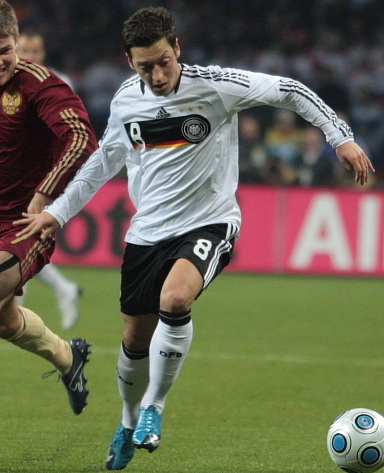
Özil playing for Germany in 2009

Eligible to play for either Germany or Turkey, after long consideration, Özil chose to play for his country of birth, Germany. In September 2006, he was called up for the Germany under-17 team. He was a member of the German under-21 team from 2007. On 29 June 2009, Özil was selected the man of the match in a 4–0 win over England during the U-21 European Championship final.

He made his debut for the senior side during a friendly match against Norway on 11 February 2009. He scored his first goal for the senior team in his third appearance, another friendly, against South Africa on 5 September in Leverkusen at the BayArena.

=== 2010 FIFA World Cup ===
Özil was selected for Germany's squad for the 2010 FIFA World Cup in South Africa, starting in all of the team's matches. He provided an assist for Cacau's goal in the 4–0 win against Australia in Germany's first group game. He scored a left-footed half-volley from the edge of the penalty area against Ghana in the final group game; the win meant Germany progressed to the second round as group winners.

On 27 June 2010, Özil played in Germany's win over England in the last 16 match, setting up the fourth goal with a cross to Thomas Müller as Germany triumphed 4–1. During the quarter-final match against Argentina, he assisted the second goal for Miroslav Klose with a cross to ensure the 4–0 final score for the Germans. FIFA announced that he was among the ten tournament players nominated for the Golden Ball.

=== UEFA Euro 2012 ===
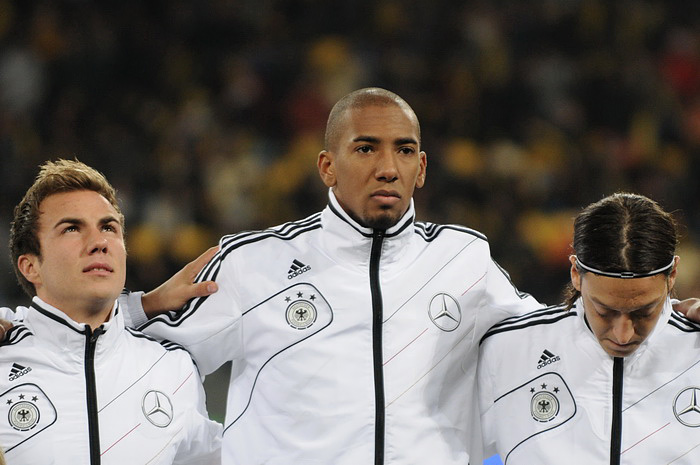
Özil lining up for Germany with Mario Götze (left) and Jérôme Boateng (in the middle) prior to a match in 2011

Özil scored five goals and provided seven assists in Germany's qualification campaign for UEFA Euro 2012, scoring five times during the campaign as Germany won all ten of its games to top their group. Özil also confirmed his reputation as a decisive passer, as he provided seven assists, more than any European international during Euro 2012 qualification. When asked about his country's chances at Euro 2012, Özil simply replied, "We have the potential to beat anyone and we have what it takes to win the title."

On 29 February 2012, Özil was recognised as Germany's best international of the year for 2011 prior to kick-off at a friendly against France in Bremen. Germany were drawn with the Netherlands, Denmark and Portugal into Group B at Euro 2012, a group described by several media outlets as the "Group of Death".

Özil registered two assists, created nine chances, and claimed the Man of the Match award in Germany's 4–2 quarter-final win over Greece. He then scored Germany's only goal (a penalty) in their 2–1 loss to Italy in the semi-finals. His performance at Euro 2012 earned him two Carlsberg Man of the Match Awards. He finished the tournament as the joint-highest assist provider (3) and was named in the Team of the Tournament.

=== 2014 FIFA World Cup ===
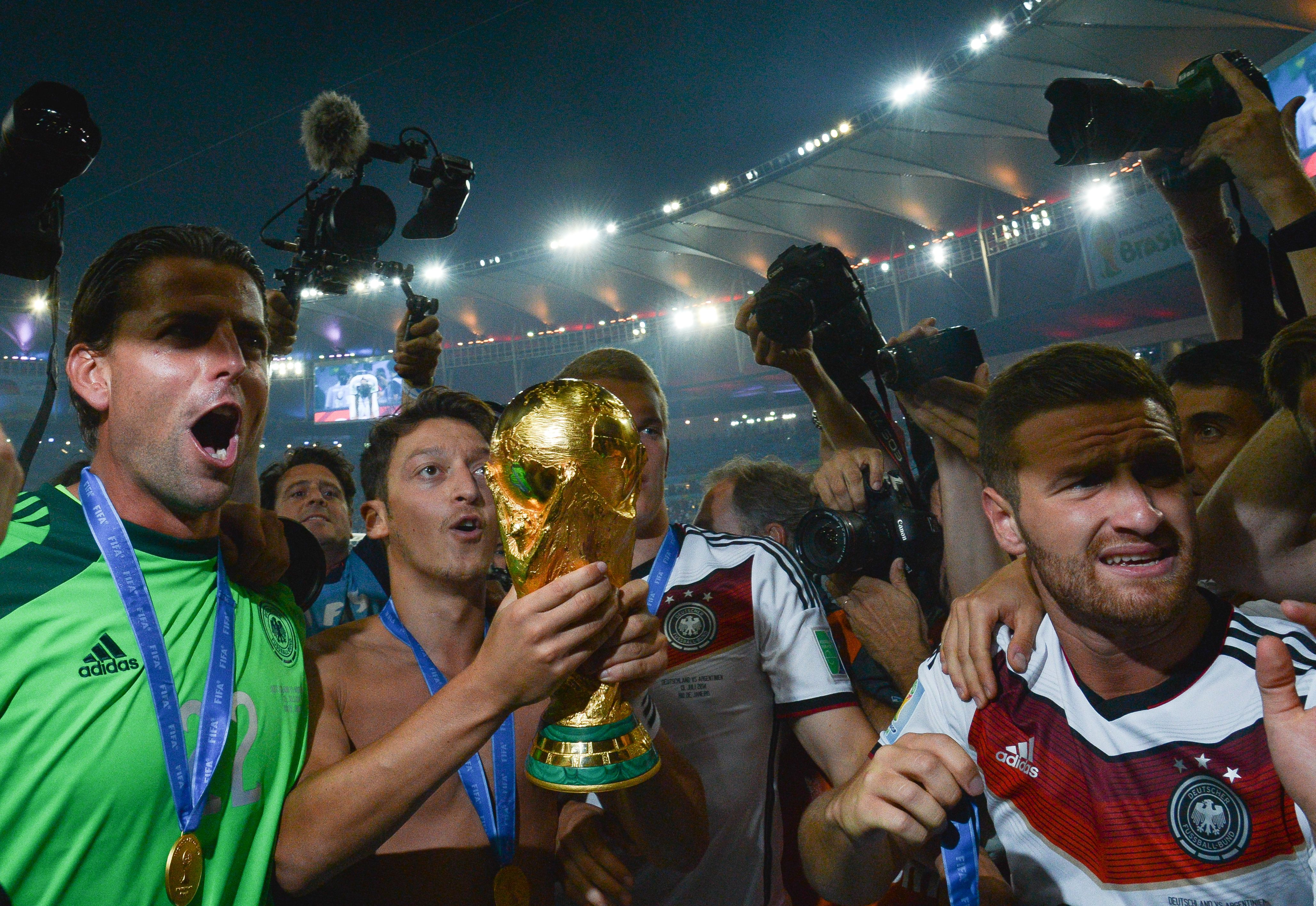
Özil holding the FIFA World Cup Trophy after the 2014 Final

Özil ended the 2014 FIFA World Cup qualification campaign as Germany's top scorer with eight goals.

Following an injury to Marco Reus in a warm-up game, Özil was moved from his customary number 10 role into the left-winger position for the majority of the tournament. He started all seven of Germany's 2014 FIFA World Cup games, and helped Germany make history by becoming the first European team to win the World Cup in South America. Özil scored the decisive goal in the 119th minute of Germany's 2–1 round of 16 victory over Algeria, a match that commentators highlighted as one of the more entertaining games of the tournament. Özil then provided an assist for Sami Khedira in Germany's 7–1 semi-final win over hosts Brazil. The goal Özil assisted, with a clever pass, made the score 5–0 to Germany after just 29 minutes. Germany's 5–0 lead after 29 minutes was widely noted as unprecedented in a World Cup semi-final.

In the final against Argentina, Özil played 120 minutes before being replaced by Arsenal teammate Per Mertesacker. Germany were crowned World Champions with a 1–0 win. After the trophy was presented to the Germany team, UEFA President Michel Platini asked Özil for his match shirt as a souvenir, and Özil obliged. He concluded the tournament as the leader in passes completed in the final-third (171), was ranked joint-second in chances created (17), behind only Lionel Messi (23), and ranked second overall in possessions won in the final-third (6).

=== UEFA Euro 2016 ===
On 12 June 2016, Özil completed the full 90 minutes of Germany's opening Euro 2016 match against Ukraine which Germany won 2–0. He assisted Bastian Schweinsteiger's goal in the 92nd minute. On 21 June 2016, Özil completed 99% of his passes, created six chances and claimed the Man of the Match award in Germany's win over Northern Ireland. Five days later, Özil started in Germany's 3–0 round of 16 win over Slovakia. In the 13th minute of the match, he had a penalty effort saved by goalkeeper Matúš Kozáčik. On 2 July 2016, Özil scored the leading goal against Italy in the quarter-finals to give Germany a 1–0 advantage, before Italy later equalised through Leonardo Bonucci's penalty. Germany, however, emerged as the victorious side after winning the penalty shoot-out 6–5, despite Özil failing to convert his penalty kick after hitting the goal post.

=== 2018 FIFA World Cup ===
Özil was selected by manager Joachim Löw in Germany's final 23-man squad for the 2018 FIFA World Cup. Despite the national team heavily under-performing as defending champions by being eliminated in the group stages, Özil featured in two of the country's three games, and averaged more chances created per 90 minutes (5.5) than any other player in the competition.

=== Retirement ===
In May 2018, Özil, alongside fellow German international İlkay Gündoğan, both of Turkish descent, met with and posed for photographs with Turkish president Recep Tayyip Erdoğan, in the lead up to the Turkish general election. The photograph was interpreted as a form of political support for Erdoğan and his policies, and caused tensions in Germany, and even prompted accusations that the players lacked loyalty to the German nation. The German Football Association (DFB) publicly distanced themselves from public criticism, opting to end the debate, and focus on the upcoming World Cup campaign, in which both Özil and Gündoğan participated.

After the nation's World Cup campaign, losing out at the group stage, Özil posted a series of messages on social media on 22 July, in order to clarify the photograph and address the criticisms he had faced. In a lengthy post, he described the photograph as simply "respecting the highest office of my family's country", while also adding his conversations with Erdoğan revolved solely around their mutual interest in football. Özil also commented on several media outlets that were using the photograph, where he asserted that the media outlets have selectively criticised him for his Turkish background, noting the relative lack of uproar from the media after Lothar Matthäus met with Russian leader Vladimir Putin.

He later detailed his core issue with the national team stemmed from his interactions with Reinhard Grindel, the DFB president, accusing him of displaying both racism and disrespect on multiple occasions, while also noting similar incidents with other high-profile German nationals, namely Bernd Holzhauer and Werner Steer. He then retired from the team as a form of protest against members within the Federation in which he perceived had "racially discriminative backgrounds". Following the announcement of his retirement, Özil drew support and criticism from the public, former players, and managers; former teammate Per Mertesacker came out in support. Toni Kroos was critical of Özil's statement and responded by saying that "racism within the national team and the DFB does not exist". In a 2018 interview with Germany's biggest newspaper Bild am Sonntag, former DFB president Reinhard Grindel said he wished he had stood by Özil in the face of racial abuse. In the years following his retirement, some media outlets argued that the criticism Özil received reflected racism in Germany. During the 2022 FIFA World Cup, the German national team covered their mouths prior to kickoff in protest of FIFAs decision to ban the OneLove armband; with the DFB explaining that the protest was meant to uphold values of diversity and mutual respect. They were subsequently criticized and labelled by some as moral hypocrites for previously ignoring and/or failing to uphold values of diversity and mutual respect when Özil was subjected to racial abuse in Germany.

== Player profile ==
=== Style of play ===
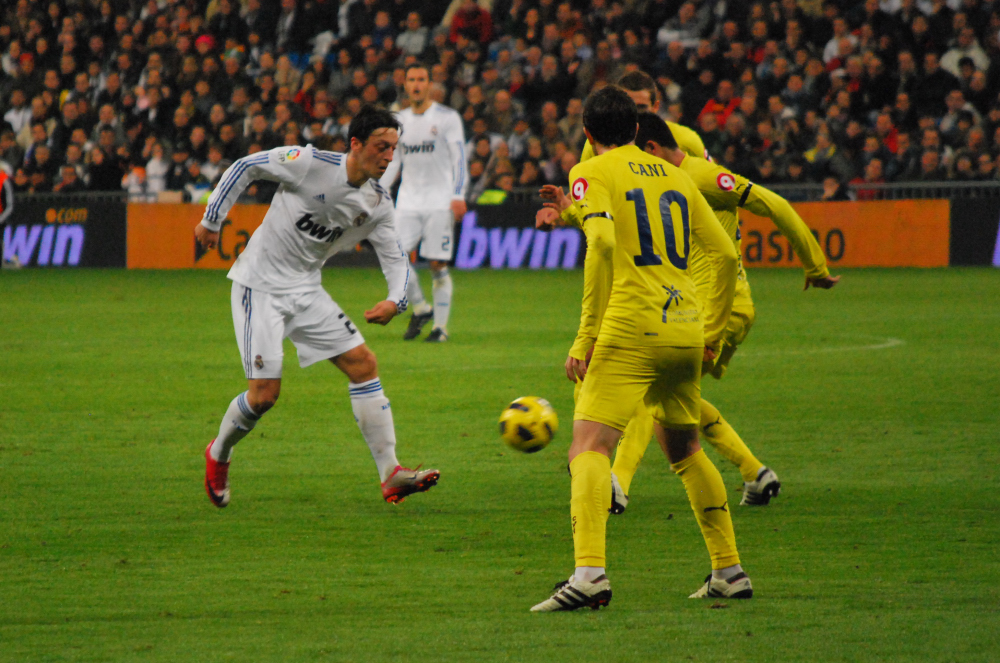
Özil with Real Madrid in 2011

A quick, agile, creative and technical player, with good dribbling skills, Özil was a versatile midfielder, who excelled in an advanced playmaking role, as a winger on either flank, or as an attacking midfielder through the centre of the pitch. During the 2010 FIFA World Cup, he was also deployed in a new role which was later described as a false 10 or central winger, due to his tendency to drift from the centre into a wide position when in possession of the ball; he was also deployed in a more advanced role, where he usually functioned as a second striker, as he often dropped into deeper positions, from which he could link the midfield with the attack and initiate passing moves. He even played as a centre-forward on occasion, seemingly operating as a lone striker, but actually operating false 9 role. Analysts have highlighted his vision, close control, movement on and off the ball, positional sense, passing range, crossing and set-piece delivery, as well as his delivery from set-pieces, which allowed him to get into good attacking positions, create chances, and provide many assists for his teammates, or even score goals himself.

Due to his creative ability and offensive prowess as a playmaker, Özil was called "assist-king" in the media. As of January 2016, Özil had the best ratio of assists per game in the history of the Premier League. Germany under-21 manager Horst Hrubesch once said, "We in Germany are prone to rave about foreign players. We praise Wayne Rooney to the heavens, likewise Ronaldo or Messi. But we have our own Messi. Our Messi is Özil." In the UEFA Euro 2012 qualifier against Belgium, he scored a goal which has been described as a "work of art". Germany coach Joachim Löw hails Özil for his "genius moments" and his performance without the ball.

=== Reception ===
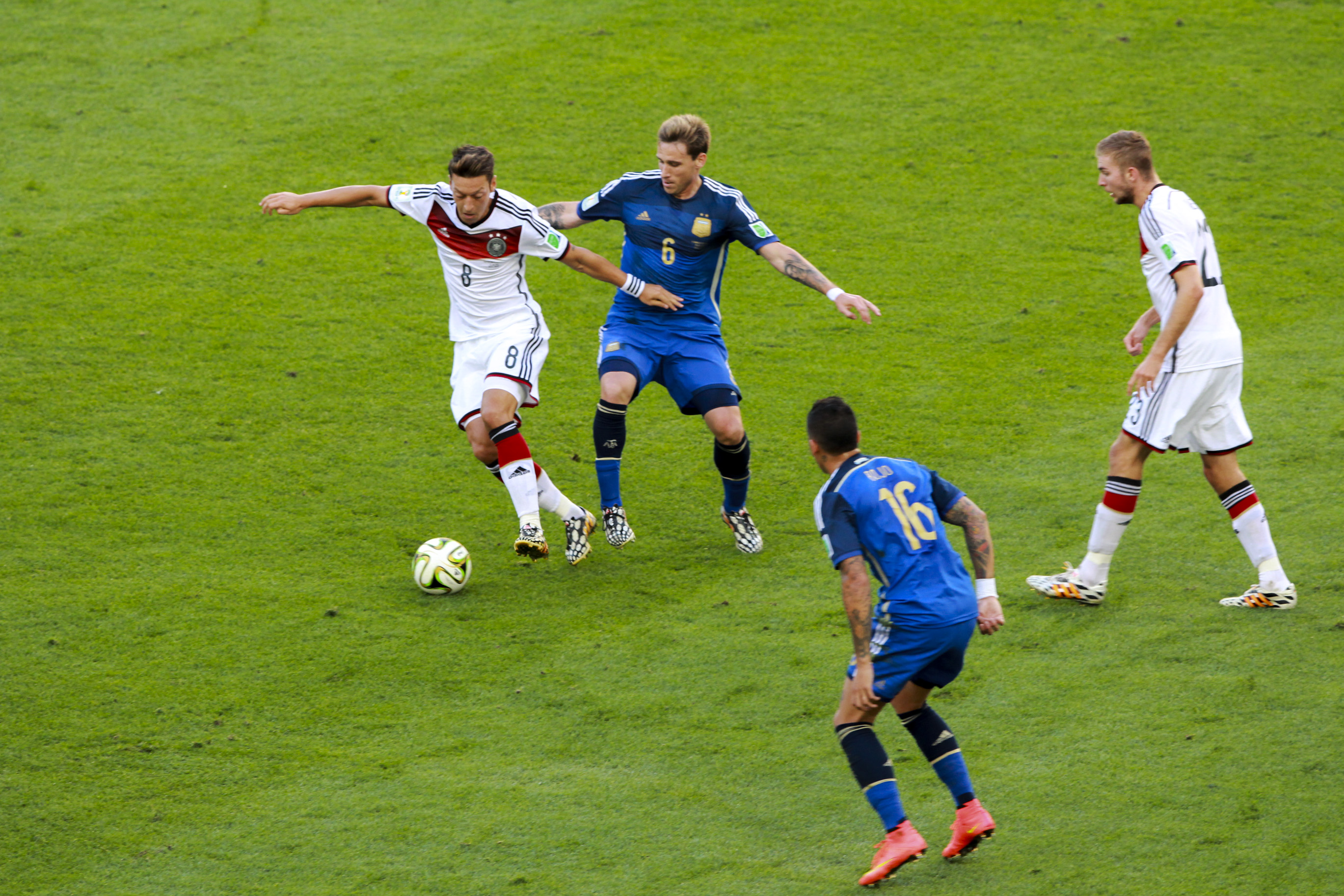
Özil in the 2014 World Cup Final

Former Real Madrid midfielder Xabi Alonso described Özil as "the kind of player you don't find these days", adding, "He understands the game, sees things, combines and thrives between the lines, unlocking teams." José Mourinho, who coached Özil for a time at Real Madrid said, "Özil is unique. There is no copy of him – not even a bad copy." Assistant coach of the Germany national team Hansi Flick said, "We are proud to have him in our team. When he has the ball, you can feel the excitement and astonishment among the fans." Former Netherlands and Milan forward Ruud Gullit described Özil as a "technically perfect" player who has "total control of the ball" and a "great imagination". Former Germany teammate Phillip Lahm said of Özil "His vision is probably the best I have ever seen... He is a dream for strikers.", while Mario Gómez called Özil "probably the most brilliant footballer we have or ever had". Despite his reputation as an offensive playmaker, Özil also drew criticism at times for his lack of physicality and his low defensive work-rate off the ball. Despite his success, he was also accused by some in the sport, including Glenn Hoddle, Raymond Domenech and Jonathan Smith, of going missing in important or physical games.

His nicknames have included "der Rabe" (the Raven, or in Spanish, "El Cuervo") – playing on his smart and opportunistic style of play, and at Werder Bremen "der neue Diego" (the new Diego), in reference to Brazilian Diego, whose playmaker role he inherited, "German Messi" and "German Zidane". At Real Madrid, he was supposedly called "Nemo", due to his physical appearance – in reference to the clownfish from the animated film Finding Nemo.

== Outside football ==
=== Personal life ===
Özil is a third-generation Turkish-German, who, in reference to his game, concludes, "My technique and feeling for the ball is the Turkish side to my game. The discipline, attitude and always-give-your-all is the German part." The first language Özil learned was Turkish. Instead of a regular kindergarten, he attended a special preschool (Vorbereitungsschule) populated exclusively with children of immigrants, mostly Turkish. Özil later said this actually greatly hindered his acquisition of German, as the children would speak German exclusively with the teacher and only Turkish for the rest of the time, saying in 2017: "even today, I need to concentrate when speaking German". He later attended school at Gesamtschule Berger Feld in Gelsenkirchen. Özil states his ancestors are ethnic Turks from Devrek. Despite being born and raised in Germany, Özil only held Turkish citizenship until the age of 19, when he renounced it in order to naturalize as a German citizen, as Germany generally did not tolerate dual citizenship until 2024, particularly for Turkish citizens.

Özil is a practising Muslim. He recites from the Quran before his matches. Talking to the Berlin-based daily Der Tagesspiegel, Özil said, "I always do that before I go out [on the pitch]. I pray and my teammates know that they cannot talk to me during this brief period." He observes fasting during the Islamic month of Ramadan, but he has admitted that: "Because of my job I cannot follow Ramadan properly. I do it only the few days I can, only when I have a free day. But other than that it's impossible, because you have to drink and eat a lot to stay at peak fitness." In May 2016, he performed Umrah pilgrimage to Mecca. During a Europa League match in 2018 against Atlético Madrid, an Atlético fan threw a piece of bread at Özil while he was preparing to take a corner. Özil picked up the bread, kissed it, and brought it to his forehead to express gratitude towards the food given to him, a central tenet in Islam. His gesture drew positive reactions from supporters and was widely shared on social media.

In 2010, Özil was awarded the Bambi for being a prime example of successful integration within German society.

Özil started dating singer Mandy Capristo in 2013. The relationship ended in 2014, following reports of Özil being involved with another woman. In 2015, Özil and Capristo appeared together at the Bambi awards ceremony in Berlin. An Instagram photo uploaded by Özil used the hashtag #OziStoIsBack, suggesting that the couple is back together. However, they broke up in 2017 and Özil began dating former Miss Turkey, Amine Gülşe. They married in 2019, and Turkish President Recep Tayyip Erdoğan was a witness during the ceremony. In March 2020, the couple confirmed the birth of their first child, a daughter named Eda. Their second daughter, named Ela, was born in September 2022.

In December 2016, as part of the release of the Football Leaks disclosure platform, it became known that the Spanish tax authorities had demanded back taxes of €2,017,152 from Mesut Özil. In addition, a fine of €789,963 was imposed on him. According to the information published by Football Leaks, Özil is said to have evaded taxes using offshore shell companies, Swiss accounts and straw men. In February 2017, Özil paid taxes in the required amount. He appealed the fine. At the beginning of 2018, the Spanish judiciary had not yet made a decision on the fine.

In July 2019, Özil and Arsenal teammate Sead Kolašinac were the victims of an attempted carjacking by a pair of armed masked men. A Metropolitan Police spokesman later said Özil and Kolašinac managed to get away unharmed and travelled to a nearby restaurant in Golders Green, where they were "spoken to by officers". Footage also circulated on social media which appeared to show Kolašinac chasing off the carjackers. Arsenal commented they reviewed security measures with their players with help from independent experts and the police, which resulted in the pair not being included in Arsenal's Premier League season opener against Newcastle United on 11 August. Later the same day, two men were arrested and charged with a public order offence after becoming involved in an altercation with security staff outside Özil's home. Police noted this incident was unrelated to the car-jacking attempt.

In 2025, Özil joined the governing Turkish Justice and Development Party as a board member.

=== Philanthropy ===
As part of the BigShoe project, Özil donated his 2014 World Cup winnings, an estimated £240,000, to pay for 23 sick Brazilian children to have medical surgery as a "personal thank you for the hospitality of the people of Brazil."

In May 2016, international media covered Özil's visit to the Zaatari refugee camp in Jordan, home to around 80,000 people displaced as a result of the Syrian civil war. Özil toured the camp as well as playing with children, signing autographs and handing out football shirts. After getting married in June 2019, Özil paid for 1,000 children to have surgery in celebration.

In 2017, he worked with the charity My Shining Star to make a child cancer patient's dreams come true. He invited the child, Charlie, to be a guest at his private box and in the player's lounge during a game with Sunderland at Emirates Stadium. In 2020, after Arsenal made longterm mascot Jerry Quy redundant, Özil offered to reimburse Arsenal for his salary if they rehired Quy, doing so due to their close friendship.

In Ramadan 2021, Özil sent food packages to 41 provinces in Turkey to people in need, in collaboration with the Turkish Red Crescent.

=== Activism and advocacy ===
In December 2019, Özil went online to publish a poem denouncing the treatment of Uyghurs in China. It was written over a backdrop of the East Turkestan flag and in it, he also criticised Muslim countries for not speaking out about the Xinjiang re-education camps. Arsenal later released a statement distancing itself from the comments. State broadcasters China Central Television and PP Sports responded two days later by removing the match between Arsenal and Manchester City from their schedules, while his likeness was removed from Chinese internet providers and version of eFootball PES 2020. The Chinese Football Association said Özil's comments were "unacceptable". Some have suggested Özil's eventual omission from the Arsenal squad was related to such criticism. China's government later stated Özil was "blinded and misled", and invited him to visit Xinjiang.

In October 2020, he voiced his support for Azerbaijan in the 2020 Nagorno-Karabakh war, quoting Mustafa Kemal Atatürk on the Azerbaijani–Turkish relations. During his presentation as a Fenerbahçe player, he posed with the Azerbaijani flag.

He announced his support for Palestine in the 2021 Israel–Palestine crisis, also wearing a "Free Palestine" T-shirt along with other Fenerbahçe footballers. In October 2021, Özil teamed with the Football Association (FA) and Football for Peace to launch a development center, located at the University of Bradford, to tackle the disparity of British Asians in association football. Quoting his own background, Özil stated a desire to "give [British Asians] an opportunity to be successful on and off the pitch". Özil has been criticized by German media sources for posting maps on Instagram with the word "Israel" crossed out and replaced with "Palestine" during the Gaza war.

=== Media and sponsorships ===
In 2013, Özil signed a sponsorship deal with German sportswear and equipment supplier Adidas. He has appeared in commercials for Adidas Predator boots with other star players such as Lionel Messi, Gareth Bale, Thomas Müller and James Rodríguez. One of those adverts, entitled "Create Your Own Game", was released in August 2015, in which Özil featured alongside those players. In 2013, Özil launched his own logo.

Özil's "M" goal celebration – which is in tribute to his young niece Mira – is included in EA Sports' FIFA 17.

His autobiography, The Magic of the Game / Gunning for Greatness, was released in 2017.

=== Business ventures ===
Özil is involved in several business ventures. He is the boss of his own M10 streetwear firm and esports team. Additionally, he has his own chain of coffee shops, a sports clinic and he jointly runs a Unity Health supplements laboratory with former Arsenal teammate Mathieu Flamini. He also owns shares in Mexican football club Necaxa as part of an ownership deal which includes other shareholders like actress Eva Longoria and model Kate Upton.

== Career statistics ==
=== Club ===
Appearances and goals by club, season and competition
Club	Season	League			National cup (Note: Includes DFB-Pokal, Copa del Rey, FA Cup, Turkish Cup)		League cup (Note: Includes DFL-Ligapokal, Football League/EFL Cup)		Europe		Other		Total	
Club	Season	Division	Apps	Goals	Apps	Goals	Apps	Goals	Apps	Goals	Apps	Goals	Apps	Goals
Schalke 04 II	2005–06	Oberliga	1	0	—		—		—		—		1	0
Schalke 04	2006–07	Bundesliga	19	0	1	0	2	0	1 (Note: Appearance(s) in UEFA Cup)	0	—		23	0
Schalke 04	2007–08	Bundesliga	11	0	1	1	0	0	4 (Note: Appearances in UEFA Champions League)	0	—		16	1
Schalke 04	Total		30	0	2	1	2	0	5	0	—		39	1
Werder Bremen	2007–08	Bundesliga	12	1	—		—		2	0	—		14	1
Werder Bremen	2008–09	Bundesliga	28	3	5	2	—		14 (Note: Four appearances in UEFA Champions League, eight appearances in UEFA Cup)	0	—		47	5
Werder Bremen	2009–10	Bundesliga	31	9	5	0	—		10 (Note: Appearances in UEFA Europa League)	2	—		46	11
Werder Bremen	2010–11	Bundesliga	—		1	0	—		—		—		1	0
Werder Bremen	Total		71	13	11	2	—		26	2	—		108	17
Real Madrid	2010–11	La Liga	36	6	6	3	—		11	1	—		53	10
Real Madrid	2011–12	La Liga	35	4	5	0	—		10	2	2 (Note: Appearances in Supercopa de España)	1	52	7
Real Madrid	2012–13	La Liga	32	9	8	0	—		10	1	2	0	52	10
Real Madrid	2013–14	La Liga	2	0	—		—		—		—		2	0
Real Madrid	Total		105	19	19	3	—		31	4	4	1	159	27
Arsenal	2013–14	Premier League	26	5	5	1	1	0	8	1	—		40	7
Arsenal	2014–15	Premier League	22	4	5	1	0	0	5	0	0	0	32	5
Arsenal	2015–16	Premier League	35	6	1	0	0	0	8	2	1 (Note: Appearance in FA Community Shield)	0	45	8
Arsenal	2016–17	Premier League	33	8	3	0	0	0	8	4	—		44	12
Arsenal	2017–18	Premier League	26	4	0	0	2	0	7	1	0	0	35	5
Arsenal	2018–19	Premier League	24	5	1	0	0	0	10	1	—		35	6
Arsenal	2019–20	Premier League	18	1	1	0	2	0	2	0	—		23	1
Arsenal	2020–21	Premier League	0	0	0	0	0	0	0	0	0	0	0	0
Arsenal	Total		184	33	16	2	5	0	48	9	1	0	254	44
Fenerbahçe	2020–21	Süper Lig	10	0	1	0	—		—		—		11	0
Fenerbahçe	2021–22	Süper Lig	22	8	0	0	—		4	1	—		26	9
Fenerbahçe	Total		32	8	1	0	—		4	1	—		37	9
İstanbul Başakşehir	2022–23	Süper Lig	4	0	1	0	—		2 (Note: Appearances in UEFA Europa Conference League)	0	—		7	0
Career total			427	73	50	8	7	0	116	16	5	1	605	98

=== International ===
Appearances and goals by national team and year
National team	Year	Apps	Goals
Germany	2009	7	1
Germany	2010	14	2
Germany	2011	9	5
Germany	2012	13	6
Germany	2013	9	3
Germany	2014	10	1
Germany	2015	8	0
Germany	2016	13	3
Germany	2017	5	1
Germany	2018	4	1
Total		92	23

Scores and results list Germany's goal tally first, score column indicates score after each Özil goal.

List of international goals scored by Mesut Özil
No.	Date	Venue	Opponent	Score	Result	Competition
1	5 September 2009	BayArena, Leverkusen, Germany	South Africa	2–0	2–0	Friendly
2	23 June 2010	Soccer City, Johannesburg, South Africa	Ghana	1–0	1–0	2010 FIFA World Cup
3	8 October 2010	Olympic Stadium, Berlin, Germany	Turkey	2–0	3–0	UEFA Euro 2012 qualification
4	7 June 2011	Tofiq Bahramov Stadium, Baku, Azerbaijan	Azerbaijan	1–0	3–1	UEFA Euro 2012 qualification
5	2 September 2011	Veltins-Arena, Gelsenkirchen, Germany	Austria	2–0	6–2	UEFA Euro 2012 qualification
6	2 September 2011	Veltins-Arena, Gelsenkirchen, Germany	Austria	4–1	6–2	UEFA Euro 2012 qualification
7	11 October 2011	Esprit Arena, Düsseldorf, Germany	Belgium	1–0	3–1	UEFA Euro 2012 qualification
8	15 November 2011	Volksparkstadion, Hamburg, Germany	Netherlands	3–0	3–0	Friendly
9	28 June 2012	National Stadium, Warsaw, Poland	Italy	1–2	1–2	UEFA Euro 2012
10	7 September 2012	AWD-Arena, Hanover, Germany	Faroe Islands	2–0	3–0	2014 FIFA World Cup qualification
11	7 September 2012	AWD-Arena, Hanover, Germany	Faroe Islands	3–0	3–0	2014 FIFA World Cup qualification
12	11 September 2012	Ernst-Happel-Stadion, Vienna, Austria	Austria	2–0	2–1	2014 FIFA World Cup qualification
13	12 October 2012	Aviva Stadium, Dublin, Ireland	Republic of Ireland	3–0	6–1	2014 FIFA World Cup qualification
14	16 October 2012	Olympic Stadium, Berlin, Germany	Sweden	4–0	4–4	2014 FIFA World Cup qualification
15	10 September 2013	Tórsvøllur, Tórshavn, Faroe Islands	Faroe Islands	2–0	3–0	2014 FIFA World Cup qualification
16	11 October 2013	Rhein-Energie Stadion, Cologne, Germany	Republic of Ireland	3–0	3–0	2014 FIFA World Cup qualification
17	15 October 2013	Friends Arena, Solna, Sweden	Sweden	1–2	5–3	2014 FIFA World Cup qualification
18	30 June 2014	Estádio Beira-Rio, Porto Alegre, Brazil	Algeria	2–0	2–1	2014 FIFA World Cup
19	29 March 2016	Allianz Arena, Munich, Germany	Italy	4–0	4–1	Friendly
20	2 July 2016	Nouveau Stade de Bordeaux, Bordeaux, France	Italy	1–0	1–1	UEFA Euro 2016
21	31 August 2016	Borussia-Park, Mönchengladbach, Germany	Finland	2–0	2–0	Friendly
22	4 September 2017	Mercedes-Benz Arena, Stuttgart, Germany	Norway	1–0	6–0	2018 FIFA World Cup qualification
23	2 June 2018	Wörtherseestadion, Klagenfurt, Austria	Austria	1–0	1–2	Friendly

== Honours ==
Werder Bremen

- DFB-Pokal: 2008–09; runner-up: 2009–10
- UEFA Cup runner-up: 2008–09

Real Madrid

- La Liga: 2011–12
- Copa del Rey: 2010–11; runner-up: 2012–13
- Supercopa de España: 2012

Arsenal

- FA Cup: 2013–14, 2014–15, 2016–17
- FA Community Shield: 2015
- EFL Cup runner-up: 2017–18
- UEFA Europa League runner-up: 2018–19

Germany U21

- UEFA European Under-21 Championship: 2009

Germany

- FIFA World Cup: 2014; third place: 2010

Individual

- kicker Bundesliga Team of the Season: 2008–09
- kicker Attacking Midfielder of the Year: 2010
- Bundesliga top assists provider: 2009–10
- La Liga top assists provider: 2011–12
- UEFA Europa League top assists provider: 2009–10
- UEFA Champions League top assists provider: 2010–11
- UEFA European Championship top assists provider: 2012
- FIFA World Cup top assists provider: 2010
- CIES Football Observatory Best Attacking Midfielder of the Year: 2015
- CIES Football Observatory Dream Team: 2015
- Premier League top assists provider: 2015–16
- Germany national team Player of the Year: 2011, 2012, 2013, 2015, 2016
- UEFA European Championship Team of the Tournament: 2012
- UEFA Team of the Year: 2012, 2013
- Laureus Media Award: 2014
- PFA Fans Player of the Month: April, November & December 2015
- German Football Ambassador Public Award: 2015
- Arsenal Player of the Season: 2015–16
- kicker Best German Abroad: 2016

Orders

- Silbernes Lorbeerblatt: 2010, 2014
