= Kashif Siddiqi =

English footballer

Personal information
- Full name: Kashif Mumtaz Siddiqi
- Date of birth: 25 January 1986 (age 40)
- Place of birth: Hammersmith, England
- Position: Defender

Youth career
- Arsenal
- Wycombe Wanderers
- 2001–2002: Hayes
- 2002–2003: Yeading
- 2003–2005: Boston United

College career
Years	Team	Apps	(Gls)
2006	Eckerd Tritons	6	(1)
2008	Presbyterian Blue Hose	14	(1)
2009–2010	Fresno Pacific Sunbirds	19	(1)

Senior career*
Years	Team	Apps	(Gls)
2009	Springfield Demize	9	(1)
2010	Fresno Fuego	0	(0)
2011	Al-Wasl	0	(0)
2012	Ventura County Fusion	0	(0)
2013–2014	Northampton Town	0	(0)
2019–2020	Oxford United	0	(0)
2019	→ Real Kashmir (loan)	0	(0)

International career^{‡}
2007	Pakistan U23	3	(0)
2008	Pakistan	1	(0)
- * Club domestic league appearances and goals as of 12:46, 22 August 2020 (UTC) ‡ National team caps and goals as of 19:20, 22 April 2013 (UTC)

Kashif Mumtaz Siddiqi (born 25 January 1986) is a former professional footballer who played as a defender. Born in England, Siddiqi played for the Pakistan national team.

After playing youth football with various teams in England, Siddiqi moved to the United States on a scholarship to play college soccer, before spending two seasons in the USL PDL, later moving to the Middle East to play.

In 2011, Siddiqi founded the Kashif Siddiqi Foundation, which aims to encourage young British Asians into the game. He is also an ambassador for Kick It Out, an anti-racism organisation.

== Early and personal life ==
Kashif Mumtaz Siddiqi was born in Hammersmith to an Indian father and a Ugandan mother. He is Muslim.

In January 2012, Siddiqi was invited to the inaugural Asian Football Awards at Wembley Stadium, where he handed out the award for Young Asian Player of the Year to Danny Batth.

In April 2012, Siddiqi was made an official ambassador for Chelsea's "Search for an Asian Star" campaign 2012, along with player Florent Malouda and Bhangra musicians Jaz Dhami and H Dhami. The 2012 edition of the tournament attracted 400 children.

== Club career ==
=== Early career in England ===
Siddiqi played youth football for Arsenal, Wycombe Wanderers, Hayes, Yeading and Boston United.

=== College career ===
In 2005 Siddiqi played college soccer in the United States on a scholarship, while studying for a degree in Business Administration, attending Eckerd College in St. Petersburg, Florida for two years and Presbyterian College for one year. He then transferred to Fresno Pacific University for his last year to finish off his degree and play club football.

=== USL PDL career ===
In 2009 the USL Premier Development League began paying some players, and that same season Siddiqi signed to play with the Springfield Demize. He made his debut for the team in their 2009 season opener against Des Moines Menace, and spent the season as club captain. He spent the 2010 season with the Fresno Fuego, also in the USL PDL.

=== Later career and injuries ===
Siddiqi later played in the Middle East, for Al-Wasl of Dubai, before his career was interrupted by a number of serious injuries.

=== Return to the USL PDL ===
Siddiqi signed for the Ventura County Fusion for the 2012 season.

=== Return to England ===
Siddiqi signed for Football League club Northampton Town in September 2013, having trained with the club during the previous season, following his recovery from a hip injury.

In August 2019, he signed for Oxford United in a player/ambassadorial role, with the intention that he would join an Indian club on loan. In September 2019, he moved to Indian club Real Kashmir on loan. He missed the first two I-League games due to injury.

He was released at the end of the 2019–20 season.

== International career ==
Siddiqi received his first national team call-up to the Pakistan under-23 team in May 2007 for the Beijing 2008 Olympic Qualifiers, making his debut against Bahrain, and playing in two further matches against Kuwait and Qatar. He was called back up to the under-23 team in 2010.

In 2008, he was called up by the senior team to take part in the SAFF Championship, and later that year he earned one full international cap.

Siddiqi has also played for the 'Pakistan XI', a team composed of Europe-based players of Pakistani origin which competes in friendly games.

== Charity work ==
Siddiqi has also attended meetings with the English Football Association on the matter of British Asians in association football. In April 2011, Siddiqi and the foundation played in a charity match to raise money for the Sodje Sports Foundation, Bury Hospice and The Bury Fusilier. He is also an ambassador for Kick It Out.

He is also the co-founder of the Football For Peace organization.

In November 2013, Siddiqi was honoured by Prince Albert II of Monaco for his charity work.
