= International Day of Sport for Development and Peace =

Annual celebration of sports

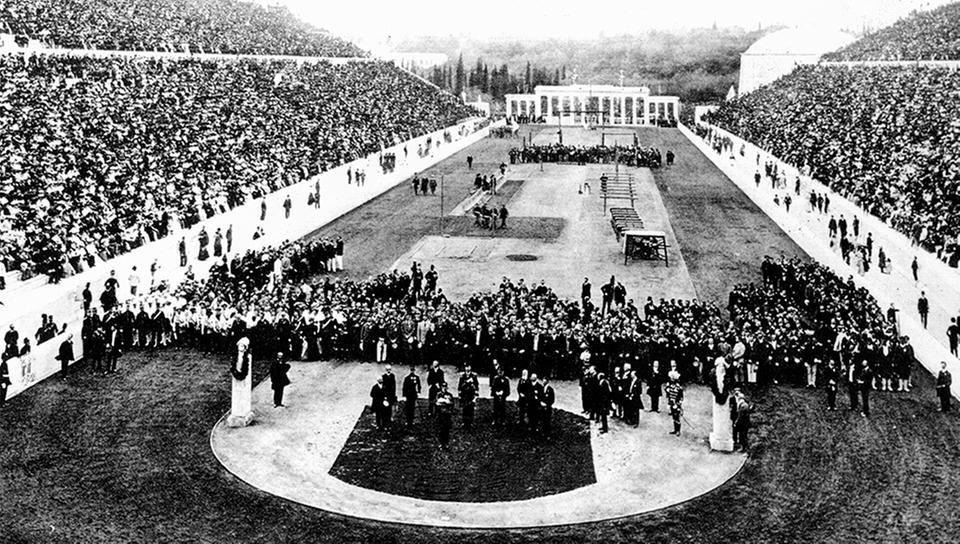
The opening ceremony of the 1896 Summer Olympics

The International Day of Sport for Development and Peace (IDSDP), held annually on 6 April, is a celebration of the power of sport to drive social change, community development and to foster peace and understanding. It was created by the United Nations General Assembly on 23 August 2013, and has been supported by the International Olympic Committee since 6 April 2014.

This date commemorates the inauguration, in 1896, of the first Olympic games of the modern era, in Athens, (Greece).

== Celebration ==
On 23 August 2013, the United Nations General Assembly in Resolution 67/296 decides to proclaim on 6 April as the International Day of Sport for Development and the Peace. The United Nations, with this commemoration, "invites States, the United Nations system and in particular the United Nations Office on Sport for Development and Peace, relevant international organizations, and international, regional and national sports organizations, civil society, including non-governmental organizations and the private sector, and all other relevant stakeholders to cooperate, observe and raise awareness of the "International Day of Sport for Development and Peace".
