= United Nations Office on Sport for Development and Peace =

International recreation organization

Office on Sport for Development and Peace
- United Nations Office on Sport for Development and Peace
- Logo of UNOSDP
- Abbreviation: UNOSDP
- Merged into: United Nations Department of and Economic and Social Affairs
- Formation: 28 February 2001; 25 years ago
- Founder: Kofi Annan
- Dissolved: 30 April 2017; 9 years ago
- Purpose: sport & peacekeeping
- Headquarters: Geneve
- Locations: Geneve, Switzerland; New York City, United States
- Coordinates: 46.2283824°N 6.1097541°E
- UN Special Adviser on Sport for Development and Peace: Wilfried Lemke
- Parent organization: United Nations
- Website: un.org/sport/

The United Nations Office on Sport for Development and Peace (UNOSDP) was introduced by Kofi Annan in 2001. Its mandate was to coordinate the efforts undertaken by the United Nations in promoting sport in a systematic and coherent way as a means to contribute to the achievement of development and peace.

The second UN Special Adviser on Sport for Development and Peace was Wilfried Lemke from Bremen, Germany. He succeeded Adolf Ogi in March 2008. UNOSDP was situated at the UN Office at Geneva. There was also a liaison office at UN Headquarters in New York.

The United Nations announced the closure of the Office on Sport for Development and Peace on 4 May 2017.

== The UN Special Adviser on Sport for Development and Peace ==
Wilfried Lemke from Germany has been the Special Adviser on Sport for Development and Peace since March 2008. He was named by UN Secretary-General Ban Ki-moon. Through this nomination, Lemke also holds the position of an Under-Secretary-General. He reports directly to the Secretary-General.

In his position as a Special Adviser, he replaced Adolf Ogi from Switzerland. Ogi, former President of the Swiss Confederation and politician, had served the UN as Special Adviser for close to seven years between 2001 and 2007.
