= 2022–23 Kerala Premier League group stage =

Football league competition

The 2022–23 Kerala Premier League group stage started from 20 November 2022. A total of 22 teams compete for the 2022–23 Kerala Premier League championship. The fixtures were announced on 15 November.

== Teams ==
KFA

| | Team | Head coach | City | Sponsor |
|---|---|---|---|---|
| 1 | BASCO FC | (India) E. Shivamani | Malappuram | Janatha TMT |
| 2 | Don Bosco FA | (India) Alphonse Jose | Kochi | |
| 3 | FC Areekode | (India) V. P. Suneer | Areekode | Essa Group |
| 4 | FC Kerala | (India) Britto Clemmi | Thrissur | Yogakshemam Loans |
| 5 | Gokulam Kerala FC B | (India) Rajeev Ponnanthari | Kozhikode | Gokulam Group |
| 6 | Golden Threads FC | (India) Soly Xavier | Kochi | Wayna Water |
| 7 | Kerala Blasters B | (Poland) Tomasz Tchórz | Kochi | Byju's |
| 8 | Kerala Police | (India) I. M. Vijayan | Malappuram | Odyssia |
| 9 | Kerala United FC | (Nigeria) Saheed Ramon | Manjeri | Micro Health Laboratories |
| 10 | KSEB | (India) P. B. Ramesh | Trivandrum | MADRE Integrated Engineering |
| 11 | Kovalam Football Club | (India) Ebin Rose | Kovalam | Federal Bank |
| 12 | Little Flower FA | (India) Cleofas Alex | Trivandrum | Odysdia |
| 13 | Luca Soccer Club | (India) Navas LUCA | Manjeri | Abreco Freight |
| 14 | MK Sporting Club | (India) Satheevan Balan | Alappuzha | M. K. Group |
| 15 | Muthoot FA | (India) K. Anees | Kochi | Muthoot Pappachan Group |
| 16 | Parappur FC | (India) Sanjoy Kumar Dey | Parappur | South Indian Bank |
| 17 | Payyannur College | | Payyannur | Tago |
| 18 | Real Malabar FC | (India) Vinu Jose | Kondotty | EDEX |
| 19 | SAT Tirur | (India) Sunil Kumar | Tirur | AB Bismi |
| 20 | SAI Kollam | (India) Deepak Boro | Kollam | |
| 21 | Travancore Royals FC | (India) Samuel Geevarghese | Trivandrum | Vismayasmax Animations |
| 22 | Wayanad United FC | (India) Sanush Raj | Kalpetta | Wagonmart |

=== Group A ===
| Pos | Team | Pld | W | D | L | GF | GA | GD | Pts | |
|---|---|---|---|---|---|---|---|---|---|---|
| 1 | Wayanad United FC | 7 | 5 | 1 | 1 | 10 | 3 | +7 | 16 | Advance to the Final Round |
| 2 | Kerala United FC | 7 | 4 | 3 | 0 | 21 | 8 | +13 | 15 | Advance to the Final Round |
| 3 | SAT TIRUR | 7 | 4 | 3 | 0 | 11 | 5 | +6 | 15 | |
| 4 | FC Areekode | 7 | 2 | 4 | 1 | 17 | 13 | +4 | 10 | |
| 5 | Real Malabar FC | 7 | 2 | 2 | 3 | 11 | 14 | −3 | 8 | |
| 6 | BASCO FC | 7 | 2 | 1 | 4 | 13 | 17 | −4 | 7 | |
| 7 | MK Sporting Club | 7 | 1 | 2 | 4 | 6 | 11 | −5 | 5 | |
| 8 | Luca Soccer Club | 7 | 0 | 0 | 7 | 4 | 18 | −14 | 0 | |

Source: KFA

=== Fixtures ===
Cancelled matches

| 24 November 2022 | SAT Tirur | 2-2 | Kerala United FC | Malappuram |
| 15:30 IST | | | | Stadium: Kotappady Stadium |

| 25 November 2022 | Real Malabar FC | 4-3 | Luca Soccer Club | Malappuram |
| 15:30 IST | | | | Stadium: Kotappady Stadium |

| 26 November 2022 | MK Sporting Club | 1-2 | Wayanad United FC | Malappuram |
| 15:30 IST | | | | Stadium: Kotappady Stadium |

| 27 November 2022 | FC Areekode | 6-3 | BASCO FC | Malappuram |
| 15:30 IST | | | | Stadium: Kotappady Stadium |

| 1 December 2022 | SAT TIRUR | 1-0 | Real Malabar FC | Malappuram |
| 15:30 IST | | | | Stadium: Kotappady Stadium |

| 2 December 2022 | Kerala United FC | 3-3 | BASCO FC | Malappuram |
| 15:30 IST | | | | Stadium: Kotappady Stadium |

| 3 December 2022 | FC Areekode | 1-1 | MK Sporting Club | Malappuram |
| 15:30 IST | | | | Stadium: Kotappady Stadium |

| 8 December 2022 | Wayanad United FC | 0-1 | Kerala United FC | Malappuram |
| 16:00 IST | | | | Stadium: Kotappady Stadium |

| 9 December 2022 | Real Malabar FC | 3-3 | FC Areekode | Malappuram |
| 15:30 IST | | | | Stadium: Kotappady Stadium |

| 10 December 2022 | BASCO FC | 3-0 | Luca Soccer Club | Malappuram |
| 15:30 IST | | | | Stadium: Kotappady Stadium |

| 11 December 2022 | MK Sporting Club | 0-2 | SAT Tirur | Malappuram |
| 15:30 IST | | | | Stadium: Kotappady Stadium |

| 15 December 2022 | Kerala United FC | 2-2 | FC Areekode | Malappuram |
| 15:30 IST | | | | Stadium: Kotappady Stadium |

| 16 December 2022 | BASCO FC | 3-2 | MK Sporting Club | Malappuram |
| 16:00 IST | | | | Stadium: Kotappady Stadium |

| 17 December 2022 | SAT Tirur | 2-0 | Luca Soccer Club | Malappuram |
| 16:00 IST | | | | Stadium: Kotappady Stadium |

| 19 December 2022 | Real Malabar FC | 1-1 | MK Sporting Club | Malappuram |
| 16:00 IST | | | | Stadium: Kotappady Stadium |

| 22 December 2022 | Wayanad United FC | 1-1 | SAT Tirur | Malappuram |
| 16:00 IST | | | | Stadium: Kotappady Stadium |

| 23 December 2022 | Real Malabar FC | 2-0 | BASCO FC | Malappuram |
| 16:00 IST | | | | Stadium: Kotappady Stadium |

| 12 January 2023 | Luca Soccer Club | 0-1 | MK Sporting Club | Malappuram |
| 15:30 IST | | | | Stadium: Kotappady Stadium |

| 13 January 2023 | BASCO FC | 0-1 | Wayanad United FC | Malappuram |
| 15:30 IST | | | | Stadium: Kotappady Stadium |

| 14 January 2023 | FC Areekode | 1-1 | SAT Tirur | Malappuram |
| 15:30 IST | | | | Stadium: Kotappady Stadium |

| 15 January 2023 | MK Sporting Club | 0-2 | Kerala United FC | Malappuram |
| 15:30 IST | | | | Stadium: Kotappady Stadium |

| 19 January 2023 | Kerala United FC | 4-1 | Real Malabar FC | Malappuram |
| 15:30 IST | | | | Stadium: Kotappady Stadium |

| 20 January 2023 | Luca Soccer Club | 1-4 | FC Areekode | Malappuram |
| 15:30 IST | | | | Stadium: Kotappady Stadium |

| 21 January 2023 | SAT Tirur | 2-1 | BASCO FC | Malappuram |
| 15:30 IST | | | | Stadium: Kotappady Stadium |

| 22 January 2023 | Wayanad United FC | 2-0 | Real Malabar FC | Malappuram |
| 15:30 IST | | | | Stadium: Kotappady Stadium |

| 28 January 2023 | Kerala United FC | 7-0 | Luca Soccer Club | Malappuram |
| 15:30 IST | | | | Stadium: Kotappady Stadium |

| 29 January 2023 | FC Areekode | 0-2 | Wayanad United FC | Malappuram |
| 15:30 IST | | | | Stadium: Kotappady Stadium |

| 2 February 2023 | Wayanad United FC | 2-0 | Luca Soccer Club | Malappuram |
| 15:30 IST | | | | Stadium: Kotappady Stadium |

=== Group B ===
| Pos | Team | Pld | W | D | L | GF | GA | GD | Pts | |
|---|---|---|---|---|---|---|---|---|---|---|
| 1 | Gokulam Kerala FC B | 6 | 6 | 0 | 0 | 15 | 4 | +11 | 18 | Advance to the Final Round |
| 2 | Kerala Police | 6 | 3 | 2 | 1 | 7 | 4 | +3 | 11 | Advance to the Final Round |
| 3 | Golden Threads FC | 6 | 3 | 0 | 3 | 11 | 9 | +2 | 9 | |
| 4 | Muthoot FA | 6 | 2 | 2 | 2 | 9 | 9 | 0 | 8 | |
| 5 | Parappur FC | 6 | 2 | 2 | 2 | 9 | 9 | 0 | 8 | |
| 6 | FC Kerala | 6 | 0 | 2 | 4 | 9 | 14 | −5 | 2 | |
| 7 | Don Bosco FA | 6 | 0 | 2 | 4 | 5 | 15 | −10 | 2 | |

Source: KFA

=== Fixtures ===
Cancelled matches

| 24 November 2022 | Kerala Police | 1-1 | Muthoot FA | Kozhikode |
| 15:30 IST | | | | Stadium: EMS Stadium |

| 26 November 2022 | Gokulam Kerala FC B | 4-2 | FC Kerala | Kozhikode |
| 15:30 IST | | | | Stadium: EMS Stadium |

| 1 December 2022 | Muthoot FA | 1-2 | Parappur FC | Kozhikode |
| 15:30 IST | | | | Stadium: EMS Stadium |

| 9 December 2022 | Parappur FC | 2-2 | Don Bosco FA | Ernakulam |
| 15:30 IST | | | | Stadium: Maharaja's College Ground |

| 10 December 2022 | FC Kerala | 0-1 | Kerala Police | Ernakulam |
| 15:30 IST | | | | Stadium: Maharaja's College Ground |

| 12 January 2023 | Golden Threads FC | 0-2 | Kerala Police | Ernakulam |
| 15:30 IST | | | | Stadium: Maharaja's College Ground |

| 15 January 2023 | Golden Threads FC | 5-0 | Don Bosco FA | Ernakulam |
| 15:30 IST | | | | Stadium: Maharaja's College Ground |

| 21 January 2023 | Parappur FC | 0-1 | Gokulam Kerala FC B | Malappuram |
| 19:00 IST | | | | Stadium: Kotappady Stadium |

| 22 January 2023 | Golden Threads FC | 2-1 | FC Kerala | Ernakulam |
| 15:30 IST | | | | Stadium: Maharaja's College Ground |

| 23 January 2023 | Don Bosco FA | 0-2 | Muthoot FA | Ernakulam |
| 15:30 IST | | | | Stadium: Maharaja's College Ground |

| 24 January 2023 | Kerala Police | 2-2 | Parappur FC | Thrissur |
| 19:00 IST | | | | Stadium: Thrissur Corporation Stadium |

| 26 January 2023 | Golden Threads FC | 1-4 | Gokulam Kerala FC B | Ernakulam |
| 15:30 IST | | | | Stadium: Maharaja's College Ground |

| 27 January 2023 | Muthoot FA | 2-2 | FC Kerala | Ernakulam |
| 15:30 IST | | | | Stadium: Maharaja's College Ground |

| 31 January 2023 | Parappur FC | 2-1 | FC Kerala | Thrissur |
| 19:00 IST | | | | Stadium: Thrissur Corporation Stadium |

| 2 February 2023 | Don Bosco FA | 0-1 | Kerala Police | Ernakulam |
| 15:30 IST | | | | Stadium: Maharaja's College Ground |

| 3 February 2023 | Golden Threads FC | 2-1 | Parappur FC | Ernakulam |
| 15:30 IST | | | | Stadium: Maharaja's College Ground |

| 5 February 2023 | Gokulam Kerala FC B | 2-0 | Don Bosco FA | Ernakulam |
| 15:30 IST | | | | Stadium: Maharaja's College Ground |

| 6 February 2023 | Muthoot FA | 2-1 | Golden Threads FC | Ernakulam |
| 15:30 IST | | | | Stadium: Maharaja's College Ground |

| 8 February 2023 | Don Bosco FA | 3-3 | FC Kerala | Ernakulam |
| 15:30 IST | | | | Stadium: Maharaja's College Ground |

| 9 February 2023 | Muthoot FA | 1-3 | Gokulam Kerala FC B | Ernakulam |
| 15:30 IST | | | | Stadium: Maharaja's College Ground |

| 12 February 2023 | Kerala Police | 0-1 | Gokulam Kerala FC B | Ernakulam |
| 15:30 IST | | | | Stadium: Maharaja's College Ground |

=== Group C ===
| Pos | Team | Pld | W | D | L | GF | GA | GD | Pts | |
|---|---|---|---|---|---|---|---|---|---|---|
| 1 | Kerala Blasters B | 6 | 4 | 1 | 1 | 19 | 10 | +9 | 13 | Advance to the Final Round |
| 2 | Kovalam Football Club | 6 | 4 | 1 | 1 | 12 | 4 | +8 | 13 | Advance to the Final Round |
| 3 | KSEB | 6 | 4 | 1 | 1 | 24 | 8 | +16 | 13 | |
| 4 | SAI Kollam | 6 | 3 | 2 | 1 | 17 | 7 | +10 | 11 | |
| 5 | Little Flower FA | 6 | 2 | 1 | 3 | 10 | 13 | −3 | 7 | |
| 6 | Payyannur College | 6 | 1 | 0 | 5 | 8 | 25 | −17 | 3 | |
| 7 | Travancore Royals | 6 | 0 | 0 | 6 | 2 | 25 | −23 | 0 | |

Source: KFA

=== Fixtures ===
Cancelled matches

| 25 November 2022 | KSEB | 2-5 | Kerala Blasters B | Kozhikode |
| 15:30 IST | | | | Stadium: EMS Stadium |

| 27 November 2022 | Travancore Royals | 1-2 | Little Flower FA | Kozhikode |
| 15:30 IST | | | | Stadium: EMS Stadium |

| 2 December 2022 | Payyannur College | 2-5 | Kerala Blasters B | Kozhikode |
| 15:30 IST | | | | Stadium: EMS Stadium |

| 4 December 2022 | Kovalam Football Club | 1-2 | KSEB | Kozhikode |
| 15:30 IST | | | | Stadium: EMS Stadium |

| 9 December 2022 | Little Flower FA | 0-1 | Kovalam Football Club | Kozhikode |
| 15:30 IST | | | | Stadium: EMS Stadium |

| 10 December 2022 | Payyannur College | 3-0 | Travancore Royals | Kozhikode |
| 15:30 IST | | | | Stadium: EMS Stadium |

| 11 December 2022 | Kovalam Football Club | 0-0 | SAI Kollam | Kozhikode |
| 16:00 IST | | | | Stadium: EMS Stadium |

| 9 January 2023 | Little Flower FA | 2-6 | SAI Kollam | Ernakulam |
| 15:30 IST | | | | Stadium: Maharaja's College Ground |

| 12 January 2023 | SAI Kollam | 4-1 | Payyannur College | Kozhikode |
| 15:30 IST | | | | Stadium: EMS Stadium |

| 14 January 2023 | SAI Kollam | 0-0 | KSEB | Kozhikode |
| 15:30 IST | | | | Stadium: EMS Stadium |

| 15 January 2023 | Kerala Blasters B | 1-1 | Little Flower FA | Kozhikode |
| 15:30 IST | | | | Stadium: EMS Stadium |

| 19 January 2023 | SAI Kollam | 2-3 | Kerala Blasters B | Thrissur |
| 15:30 IST | | | | Stadium: Thrissur Corporation Stadium |

| 21 January 2023 | Travancore Royals | 1-5 | SAI Kollam | Ernakulam |
| 15:30 IST | | | | Stadium: Maharaja's College Ground |

| 21 January 2023 | Payyannur College | 1-3 | Kovalam Football Club | Thrissur |
| 15:30 IST | | | | Stadium: Thrissur Corporation Stadium |

| 25 January 2023 | Little Flower FA | 4-0 | Payyannur College | Thrissur |
| 19:00 IST | | | | Stadium: Thrissur Corporation Stadium |

| 28 January 2023 | Kerala Blasters B | 1-3 | Kovalam Football Club | Thrissur |
| 16:00 IST | | | | Stadium: Thrissur Corporation Stadium |

| 28 January 2023 | Travancore Royals | 0-7 | KSEB | Thrissur |
| 19:00 IST | | | | Stadium: Thrissur Corporation Stadium |

| 30 January 2023 | KSEB | 4-1 | Little Flower FA | Thrissur |
| 15:30 IST | | | | Stadium: Thrissur Corporation Stadium |

| 2 February 2023 | Kovalam Football Club | 3-0 | Travancore Royals | Thrissur |
| 19:00 IST | | | | Stadium: Thrissur Corporation Stadium |

| 3 February 2023 | KSEB | 9-1 | Payyannur College | Thrissur |
| 19:00 IST | | | | Stadium: Thrissur Corporation Stadium |

| 4 February 2023 | Travancore Royals | 0-4 | Kerala Blasters B | Thrissur |
| 19:00 IST | | | | Stadium: Thrissur Corporation Stadium |
