= 2023–24 Kerala Premier League group stage =

Football league competition

The 11th Scoreline Kerala Premier league started at the Kottappadi Stadium, Malappuram, on November 25. Twenty teams, divided into two groups, in action in the league and the two three from each pool will enter the Super Six stage which will be held in Kannur early next year. The fixtures were announced on 18 November 2023.

== Group stage ==
=== Group A ===
Pos	Team	Pld	W	D	L	GF	GA	GD	Pts	
1	Kerala United FC	9	7	2	0	26	7	+19	23	Advanced to the Final Round
2	SAT Tirur	9	7	1	1	21	13	+8	22	Advanced to the Final Round
3	Wayanad United FC	9	5	2	2	16	6	+10	17 (Note: Ranked on head-to-head points: Wayanad United FC 3, Gokulam Kerala 'B' 0)	Advanced to the Final Round
4	Gokulam Kerala 'B'	9	5	2	2	22	9	+13	17 (Note: Ranked on head-to-head points: Wayanad United FC 3, Gokulam Kerala 'B' 0)	
5	Real Malabar FC	9	4	2	3	16	13	+3	14	
6	Devagiri College	9	3	2	4	11	12	−1	11	
7	FC Areekode	9	3	2	4	10	13	−3	11	
8	FC Kerala	9	2	0	7	12	27	−15	6	
9	BASCO FC	9	1	1	7	12	34	−22	4	
10	LUCA SC	9	0	2	7	3	15	−12	2	

Source: The Away End

=== Fixtures ===
==== Phase 1 ====
25 November 2023	Gokulam Kerala FC B	0-0	Kerala United FC	Malappuram
19:00 IST		Report		Stadium: Kotappady Stadium; Man of the Match: Bibin Boban

26 November 2023	Real Malabar	1-2	FC Areekode	Malappuram
19:00 IST	Nandu 21'		Kiran 32'; Haris 66'	Stadium: Kotappady Stadium

30 November 2023	Devagiri College	2-2	BASCO FC	Malappuram
19:00 IST	Sanad 45+2'; Niyaj 89'		Saheer 59', 64'	Stadium: Kotappady Stadium

1 December 2023	Gokulam Kerala FC B	1-1	SAT Tirur	Malappuram
19:00 IST	Ashiq 90+8'		Rahul 43'	Stadium: Kotappady Stadium

2 December 2023	FC Areekode	0-0	LUCA SC	Malappuram
19:00 IST				Stadium: Kotappady Stadium

3 December 2023	Real Malabar	2-1	FC Kerala	Malappuram
16:00 IST	Dilshad 53'; Vivek 88'		cajeettan 78'	Stadium: Kotappady Stadium

6 December 2023	SAT Tirur	1-0	Wayanad United	Malappuram
16:00 IST	Mahdi 90+5'			Stadium: Kotappady Stadium

7 December 2023	BASCO FC	2-6	Gokulam Kerala FC B	Malappuram
16:00 IST	Sherim 45', 79' (P)		Ashiq 3'; Shjin T 43', 70', 90+3'; Bibin A 45+3'; Najeeb 59'	Stadium: Kotappady Stadium

8 December 2023	LUCA SC	1-1	Real Malabar	Malappuram
19:00 IST	Shahajas 39'		Dilshad 53'	Stadium: Kotappady Stadium

9 December 2023	FC Kerala	0-4	FC Areekode	Malappuram
16:00 IST			Naseef 2', 18', 22'; Rijas 89'	Stadium: Kotappady Stadium

10 December 2023	Devagiri College	3-1	Wayanad United	Malappuram
16:00 IST	Sanad 43' (P); Danish 67'; Niyaj 79'		Sanoop 70'	Stadium: Kotappady Stadium

13 December 2023	Gokulam Kerala FC B	1-2	Real Malabar	Malappuram
16:00 IST	Bibin 79'		Sravan 6'; Dilshad 84'	Stadium: Kotappady Stadium

14 December 2023	SAT Tirur	2-1	LUCA SC	Malappuram
19:00 IST	Rahul 45+1'; Aswin 48'		Navaf 86'	Stadium: Kotappady Stadium

15 December 2023	FC Areekode	0-1	Wayanad United	Malappuram
19:00 IST			Jishnu 55'	Stadium: Kotappady Stadium

16 December 2023	Devagiri College	3-1	FC Kerala	Malappuram
19:00 IST	Arjun 10'; Jahangir 42'; Sanad 85' (P)		Nihal 27'	Stadium: Kotappady Stadium

17 December 2023	BASCO FC	0-6	Kerala United FC	Malappuram
16:00 IST			Lalsiem 14', 85', 90+2'; Nithin 28'; Thufail 30'; Noufal 41'	Stadium: Kotappady Stadium

21 December 2023	LUCA SC	0-2	BASCO FC	Malappuram
19:00 IST			Amanulla 67'; Arjun 90+1'	Stadium: Kotappady Stadium

22 December 2023	Wayanad United	0-0	Real Malabar	Malappuram
16:00 IST				Stadium: Kotappady Stadium

=== Phase 2 ===
30 December 2023	Gokulam Kerala FC B	8-0	FC Kerala	Kannur
19:00 IST	Aman 24'; Ashiq 32', 53'; Shjin T 35', 64'; Sourav 41'; Basith 67'			Stadium: Jawahar Stadium

2 January 2024	FC Areekode	2-0	BASCO FC	Kannur
16:00 IST	Risvan 15', 89'			Stadium: Jawahar Stadium

3 January 2024	FC Kerala	0-1	Wayanad United	Kannur
16:00 IST			Sanoop 24'	Stadium: Jawahar Stadium

3 January 2024	Real Malabar	1-2	SAT TIRUR	Kannur
19:00 IST	Ashiq 90+8' (P)		Abin 65' (o.g.); Imran 71'	Stadium: Jawahar Stadium

5 January 2024	FC Areekode	1-1	Devagiri College	Kannur
19:00 IST	Risvan 45'		Favas 37'	Stadium: Jawahar Stadium

6 January 2024	BASCO FC	3-4	SAT TIRUR	Kannur
16:00 IST	Kunji 7'; Nasmal 53', 80'		Basheer 40'; Imran 50'; Rahul 59'; aswin 64'	Stadium: Jawahar Stadium

7 January 2024	Kerala United FC	2-2	Wayanad United	Kannur
19:00 IST	Craig Mangkhanlian 45'; William Lalnunfela 72' (P)		Arunlal 60' (P); Sreenath 62'	Stadium: Jawahar Stadium

8 January 2024	Luca Soccer Club	0-3	Gokulam Kerala FC B	Kozhikode
19:00 IST			Shjin T 6', 82', 87'	Stadium: EMS Stadium

9 January 2024	Kerala United FC	1-0	Devagiri College	Kannur
16:00 IST	Abdhu Raheem 43'			Stadium: Jawahar Stadium

10 January 2024	SAT TIRUR	2-1	FC Areekode	Kannur
16:00 IST	Mahdi 81', 84'		Harshal 36'	Stadium: Jawahar Stadium

12 January 2024	Kerala United FC	2-1	FC Kerala	Kannur
16:00 IST	Muheeb 47'; Mukthar 90+10'		Abhiav 40'	Stadium: Jawahar Stadium

12 January 2024	Wayanad United	4-0	Gokulam Kerala B	Kannur
19:00 IST	Ameen 1'; Sreenath 21', 65', 76'			Stadium: Jawahar Stadium

13 January 2024	BASCO FC	1-5	Real Malabar	Kannur
19:00 IST	Sharon 36'		Dilshad 2', 8'; Midlaj 9'; Rashith 80'; Vishnu 81'	Stadium: Jawahar Stadium

15 January 2024	FC Kerala	3-1	Luca Soccer Club	Kannur
16:00 IST	Adwaith 11'; Mumin 54' (o.g.); Amal 83' (P)		joshua 18'	Stadium: Jawahar Stadium

15 January 2024	Devagiri College	0-3	SAT TIRUR	Kannur
18:30 IST			Nisham 32' (P); Fayis 83'; Rahul 86'	Stadium: Jawahar Stadium

16 January 2024	Kerala United FC	6-0	FC Areekode	Kannur
19:00 IST	Noufal 45+1'; Vanlalmalsawma 45+5', 53'; mukthar 49'; Thufail 59'; Rizwan Shoukath 79'			Stadium: Jawahar Stadium

17 January 2024	FC Kerala	3-2	BASCO FC	Kannur
16:00 IST	Amal 29'; Aneesh 45+2', 64'		Jyothish 32'; Sharon 60'	Stadium: Jawahar Stadium

17 January 2024	Gokulam Kerala FC B	1-0	Devagiri College	Kozhikode
19:00 IST	Fahad 76'			Stadium: EMS Stadium

18 January 2024	Real Malabar	2-4	Kerala United FC	Kannur
19:00 IST	Dilshad 3'; Ashif 7'		Raheem 30'; Noufal 34'; Thufail 51'; Riswan S 86'	Stadium: Jawahar Stadium

19 January 2024	Wayanad United	1-0	Luca Soccer Club	Kannur
19:00 IST	Rahul 6'			Stadium: Jawahar Stadium

20 January 2024	Devagiri College	1-2	Real Malabar	Kannur
16:00 IST	Jiyad 49'		Ashif 17'; Vishnu 43'	Stadium: Jawahar Stadium

21 January 2024	SAT TIRUR	2-3	Kerala United FC	Kannur
19:00 IST	Nisham 25'; Arshad 77'		Lalsiem 5'; Abdu Raheem 59', 65'	Stadium: Jawahar Stadium

22 January 2024	FC Areekode	0-2	Gokulam Kerala FC B	Kozhikode
19:00 IST			Bibin Boban 84'; Najeeb 90+5'	Stadium: EMS Stadium

23 January 2024	Luca Soccer Club	0-1	Devagiri College	Kannur
19:00 IST			Shameel 78'	Stadium: Jawahar Stadium

24 January 2024	Wayanad United	6-0	BASCO FC	Kannur
16:00 IST	Arunlal 36', 48'; Rahul Venu 45+4', 66' (P); Sreenath 80', 88'			Stadium: Jawahar Stadium

25 January 2024	FC Kerala	3-4	SAT TIRUR	Kannur
19:00 IST	Fahajas 26' (OG); Abhinav 51'; Amal 83' (P)		Rahul KP 48', 63'; Nisham 60'; Rahil 90+9'	Stadium: Jawahar Stadium

26 January 2024	Luca Soccer Club	0-2	Kerala United FC	Kannur
19:00 IST			Lalsiem 25'; Thufail 29'	Stadium: Jawahar Stadium

=== Group B ===
Pos	Team	Pld	W	D	L	GF	GA	GD	Pts	
1	Kerala Police FC	9	9	0	0	30	2	+28	27	Advanced to the Final Round
2	Muthoot FA	9	6	0	3	24	6	+18	18	Advanced to the Final Round
3	KSEB FC	9	5	0	4	23	11	+12	15	Advanced to the Final Round
4	Golden Threads FC	9	5	0	4	23	14	+9	15	
5	Kovalam FC	9	4	2	3	16	11	+5	14	
6	Kerala Blasters FC 'B'	9	4	1	4	18	14	+4	13	
7	Parappur FC	9	4	0	5	16	21	−5	12	
8	Little Flower FA	9	3	2	4	27	24	+3	11	
9	SAI Kollam	9	1	2	6	9	26	−17	5	
10	MK Sporting Club	9	0	1	8	3	60	−57	1	

Source: The Away End

=== Fixtures ===
==== Phase 1 ====
26 November 2023	Kerala Blasters B	1-2	Kerala Police	Malappuram
16:00 IST	Korou 46'		Sujil 52'; Sajeesh 87'	Stadium: Kotappady Stadium

30 November 2023	MK Sporting Club	1-1	SAI Kollam	Malappuram
16:00 IST	Anfan 33'		Abul 3'	Stadium: Kotappady Stadium

1 December 2023	Golden Threads FC	1-0	Muthoot FA	Malappuram
16:00 IST	Ashar 35'			Stadium: Kotappady Stadium

2 December 2023	Kerala Police	4-1	Kovalam	Malappuram
16:00 IST	Bijesh 25'; Sujil 28'; Sajeesh 40'; Vibin 76'		Jithu 78'	Stadium: Kotappady Stadium

3 December 2023	Kerala Blasters B	2-1	KSEB	Malappuram
19:00 IST	Sreekuttan 45+1'; Sahil 67'		Jijo 90+9'	Stadium: Kotappady Stadium

6 December 2023	Kerala Police	6-0	MK Sporting Club	Malappuram
19:00 IST	Firoz 24'; Akhiljith 32'; Sujil 45', 72'; Bijesh 76'; Jimshad 90+3'			Stadium: Kotappady Stadium

7 December 2023	Muthoot FA	3-2	KSEB	Malappuram
19:00 IST	Junain 3', 57', 70'		Bilal 31'; John Paul 90+4'	Stadium: Kotappady Stadium

8 December 2023	Kovalam	3-1	Kerala Blasters B	Malappuram
16:00 IST	Abin 13' (pen.); Vyshnav 63', 88'		Aman 75'	Stadium: Kotappady Stadium

9 December 2023	Golden Threads FC	3-5	Little Flower FA	Malappuram
19:00 IST	Dipin 2'; Ashar 26', 45+1'		Bexon 23'; Ajin 64'; Sanu 77', 90+4'; Ashwin 89'	Stadium: Kotappady Stadium

10 December 2023	SAI Kollam	2-4	Parappur FC	Malappuram
19:00 IST	Midul 10', 68'		Dinghu 25'; Anandhu 45', 61'; Rupam 55'	Stadium: Kotappady Stadium

13 December 2023	Kerala Blasters B	8-0	MK Sporting Club	Malappuram
19:00 IST	Sreekuttan 21'; Nisham 40'; Darshan 53' (o.g.); Vipin 64'; Shijas 70'; Aman 80', 85'; Aritra 83'			Stadium: Kotappady Stadium

14 December 2023	Golden Threads FC	7-0	Parappur FC	Malappuram
16:00 IST	Hijas 41'; Ashar 44', 63', 71'; Saikhom 69' (o.g.); Ashif 86'; Alvin 90+3'			Stadium: Kotappady Stadium

15 December 2023	Kerala Police	5-0	SAI Kollam	Malappuram
16:00 IST	Firoz 45+2', 55', 70'; Bijesh 63'; Sanju 80' (pen.)			Stadium: Kotappady Stadium

16 December 2023	KSEB	2-1	Little Flower FA	Malappuram
16:00 IST	Bilal 1'; Sreeraj 8'		Sabin 23'	Stadium: Kotappady Stadium

17 December 2023	Muthoot FA	0-1	Kovalam	Malappuram
19:00 IST			Jithu 79'	Stadium: Kotappady Stadium

20 December 2023	SAI Kollam	0-5	Little Flower FA	Malappuram
16:00 IST			Sabin 45+3'; Alan 48', 90+2'; Tony 62'; Jobin 76'	Stadium: Kotappady Stadium

21 December 2023	Parappur FC	0-1	Muthoot FA	Malappuram
16:00 IST			Bavijith 76'	Stadium: Kotappady Stadium

22 December 2023	Kerala Blasters B	0-4	Golden Threads FC	Malappuram
19:00 IST			Ashar 34', 85'; Hari 51'; Vishak 63'	Stadium: Kotappady Stadium

==== Phase 2 ====
30 December 2023	Little Flower FA	2-2	Kerala Blasters B	Kannur
16:00 IST	Tony 70'; Sharon 73'		Shijas 56', 89'	Stadium: Jawahar Stadium

31 December 2023	MK Sporting Club	0-4	Golden Threads FC	Kannur
16:00 IST			Swabhir 26' (o.g.); Ashar 43', 82'; Faris 90+2'	Stadium: Jawahar Stadium

31 December 2023	Kovalam	0-2	KSEB	Kannur
19:00 IST			Sreeraj 36'; john Paul 89'	Stadium: Jawahar Stadium

2 January 2024	Parappur FC	0-5	Kerala Police	Kannur
19:00 IST			Akhiljith 16', 59'; Sanju 55' (P); Sajeesh 56'; Babblee 83'	Stadium: Jawahar Stadium

4 January 2024	MK Sporting Club	0-4	Kovalam	Kannur
16:00 IST			Idreesh 56', 61'; Manoj 59'; Rafsal 72'	Stadium: Jawahar Stadium

4 January 2024	SAI Kollam	0-1	Muthoot FA	Kannur
19:00 IST			Rafsal 90+5'	Stadium: Jawahar Stadium

5 January 2024	Little Flower FA	0-4	Kerala Police	Kannur
16:00 IST			Shabas 17'; Bijesh 20' (P); Sujil 52'	Stadium: Jawahar Stadium

6 January 2024	Muthoot FA	2-0	Kerala Blasters B	Kannur
19:00 IST	Bibin 17', 31'			Stadium: Jawahar Stadium

7 January 2024	KSEB	3-4	SAI Kollam	Kannur
16:00 IST	Safwan 8'; Ajeer 41'; Bilal 73'		Andrews 33', 42'; Anoop 44'; Midul 68'	Stadium: Jawahar Stadium

8 January 2024	Kovalam	4-0	Golden Threads FC	Kochi
15:30 IST	Shafi 47'; Anfas 50', 60'; Manoj 90+5'			Stadium: Maharaja's College Ground

9 January 2024	MK Sporting Club	2-6	Parappur FC	Kannur
19:00 IST				Stadium: Jawahar Stadium

10 January 2024	Kerala Police	1-0	KSEB	Kannur
19:00 IST	Firos K 83'			Stadium: Jawahar Stadium

11 January 2024	Parappur FC	4-0	Little Flower FA	Thrissur
15:30 IST	Rupam 20'; Aghin 30', 42'; Jishnu 54'			Stadium: Thrissur Corporation Stadium

11 January 2024	Kovalam	1-1	SAI Kollam	Kannur
16:00 IST	Akshay 48'		Josefin 18' (P)	Stadium: Jawahar Stadium

13 January 2024	MK Sporting Club	0-9	KSEB	Kannur
16:00 IST			Salim 4'; Crispin 34', 49', 79'; Aswin 63'; Sreeraj 65'; John Paul 77', 88', 90+1'	Stadium: Jawahar Stadium

14 January 2024	Parappur FC	0-2	Kerala Blasters B	Kannur
16:00 IST			Sreekuttan 25', 83'	Stadium: Jawahar Stadium

15 January 2024	Golden Threads FC	0-1	Kerala Police	Kochi
15:30 IST			Brijith 87' (o.g.)	Stadium: Maharaja's College Ground

16 January 2024	Muthoot FA	8-0	Little Flower FA	Kannur
14:00 IST				Stadium: Jawahar Stadium

18 January 2024	Parappur FC	2-1	Kovalam	Kannur
16:00 IST	Anandhu 22'; Ridhin 61'		Akshay 2'	Stadium: Jawahar Stadium

19 January 2024	Little Flower FA	13-0	MK Sporting Club	Kannur
16:00 IST	Sanu 22', 29', 45+2'; Hashir 25', 62', 67'; Sanjay 39', 41'; Anittan 43'; Jacob 48'; Saivin 65', 75'			Stadium: Jawahar Stadium

20 January 2024	Muthoot FA	0-2	Kerala Police	Kannur
19:00 IST			Firos 40'; Sajeesh 90+5'	Stadium: Jawahar Stadium

21 January 2024	KSEB	3-0	Golden Threads FC	Kochi
15:30 IST	Sreeraj 5', 78'; Crispin 44'			Stadium: Maharaja's College Ground

22 January 2024	SAI Kollam	0-2	Kerala Blasters B	Ernakulam
15:30 IST			Ebindas 48'; Sahil 90+5'	Stadium: Panampalli Ground

23 January 2024	Muthoot FA	9-0	MK Sporting Club	Kannur
16:00 IST	Salahudheen 10', 20', 28' (P); Rathin Lal 60'; Athul 72'			Stadium: Jawahar Stadium

24 January 2024	Little Flower FA	1-1	Kovalam	Kannur
19:00 IST	Hashir 90+4'		Vyshnav 25'	Stadium: Jawahar Stadium

25 January 2024	KSEB	1-0	Parappur FC	Kannur
16:00 IST	Crispin 16'			Stadium: Jawahar Stadium

26 January 2024
16:00 IST
SAI Kollam
- Anoop 59'
1-4

Golden Threads FC
- Alvin 1', 53'

*Asif  65'

*Jebin 90+2'
Kochi
Stadium: Maharaja's College Ground
