= 2023–24 Kerala Premier League =

10th season of Kerala Premier League

Kerala Premier League
- Season: 2023–24
- Dates: 19 August 2023 – 11 February 2024
- Champions: Kerala United FC (2nd title)
- Promoted: Kerala United; Sports Academy Tirur
- Matches: 108
- Goals: 385 (3.56 per match)
- Top goalscorer: Salahudheen Adnan (Muthoot FA) (11 goals)
- Biggest win: LIFFA 13–0 MK Sporting Club (19 January 2024)
- Highest scoring: LIFFA 13–0 MK Sporting Club (19 January 2024)
- Longest winning run: Kerala Police (13 games)
- Longest unbeaten run: Kerala Police (14 games)
- Longest winless run: MK Sporting Club (9 games)
- Longest losing run: MK Sporting Club (8 games)

The 2023–24 Kerala Premier League was the eleventh season of the Kerala Premier League, which is the highest level of the State league system and fifth of the overall Indian football league system.

== Qualifiers ==
	Team	Head coach	City	Sponsor
1	Devagiri College		Kozhikode	
2	WMO Muttil		Kalpetta	
3	EMEA College		Kondotty	
4	Talents Association			
5	Shooters United	(India) Ahamad Rasheed	Padne	
6	Travancore Royals FC	(India) Samuel Geevarghese	Trivandrum	Vismayasmax Animations
7	Sri Vyasa College		Wadakkancherry	
8	Cosmos		Kottayam	
9	Golden Threads FC	(India) Soly Xavier	Kochi	Wayna Water
10	Travancore United		Trivandrum	
11	LUCA SC	(India) Navas Luca	Kondotty	Abreco Freight

=== Venues ===
Venues were announced on 14 August 2023.

Group	Stadium	Capacity	Location
Pool A	AIFA Ground		Koppam
Pool B	Maharaja's College Ground	20,000	Kochi

== Teams ==
KFA

1	BASCO FC	(India) E. Shivamani		Othukkungal	Janatha TMT
2	Devagiri College			Kozhikode	
3	FC Areekode			Areekode	Essa Group
4	FC Kerala	(India) Britto Clemmi		Thrissur	Yogakshemam Loans
5	Golden Threads FC	(India) Abhijith		Kochi	Wayna Water
6	Gokulam Kerala B	(India) Baiju GS	Bibin Boban	Kozhikode	CSB Bank
7	Kerala Blasters B	(Poland) Tomasz Tchórz	Aritra Das	Kochi	Byju's
8	Kerala Police	(India) Shimjith	Vibin Thomas	Malappuram	Off Road Nilambur
9	Kerala United FC	(Nigeria) Saheed Ramon	Muhammed Noufal	Malappuram	YELO
10	KSEB	(India) P. B. Ramesh		Trivandrum	MADRE Integrated Engineering
11	Kovalam	(India) Ebin Rose		Kovalam	Federal Bank
12	Little Flower FA	(India) Boniface M	Bexon D	Trivandrum	Hykon
13	LUCA SC	(India) Syed Muhammed Rafi	Shahajas Thekkan	Kondotty	Abreco Freight
14	MK Sporting Club	(India) Satheevan Balan		Alappuzha	YRS
15	Muthoot FA	(India) K. Anees		Kochi	Muthoot Pappachan Group
16	Parappur FC	(India) Sanjoy Kumar Dey	Hafis	Parappur	South Indian Bank
17	Real Malabar FC	(India) Shinoj Madathil	Thahir Zaman	Kondotty	VKS
18	SAT Tirur	(India) Haary Benny	Nisham Monu	Tirur	SAT Qatar
19	SAI Kollam	(India) Deepak Boro		Kollam	
20	Wayanad United	(India) Sanush Raj	Jaimy	Kalpetta	Wagonmart

=== Number of teams by region ===
No. of teams	Districts	Team(s)
7	Malappuram	BASCO, FC Areekode, Kerala Police, Kerala United, LUCA SC, Real Malabar, SAT Tirur
3	Trivandrum	Kovalam, KSEB, LIFFA
3	Ernakulam	Golden Threads, Kerala Blasters B, Muthoot FA
2	Kozhikode	Devagiri College, Gokulam Kerala B
2	Thrissur	FC Kerala, Parappur FC
1	Alappuzha	MK Sporting Club
1	Kollam	SAI Kollam
1	Wayanad	Wayanad United

== Matches ==
=== Pool A ===
19 August 2023	Devagiri College	2-1	WMO Muttil	Koppam
15:30	Badusha 27'; Thameem 88'		Arjun 90+5'	Stadium: AIFA Ground

20 August 2023	EMEA College	4-2	Talents Association	Koppam
15:30				Stadium: AIFA Ground

21 August 2023	Travancore Royals FC	0-2	Devagiri College	Koppam
15:30		Report		Stadium: AIFA Ground

22 August 2023	Shooters United	0-1	EMEA College	Koppam
15:30				Stadium: AIFA Ground

23 August 2023	Devagiri College	0-0 (4-3 p)	EMEA College	Koppam
15:30				Stadium: AIFA Ground

=== Pool B ===
24 August 2023	Sri Vyasa College	1-0	Cosmos FC	Kochi
15:30				Stadium: Maharaja's College Ground

25 August 2023	Golden Threads FC	2-3	Sri Vyasa College	Kochi
15:30				Stadium: Maharaja's College Ground

26 August 2023	Travancore United	1-8	Luca Soccer Club	Kochi
15:30				Stadium: Maharaja's College Ground

27 August 2023	Sri Vyasa College	0-1	Luca Soccer Club	Kochi
15:30				Stadium: Maharaja's College Ground

Promoted teams:

- Devagiri College
- LUCA SC

== Coaching changes ==
Team	Outgoing coach	Manner of departure	Date of vacancy	Ref.	Round	Table	Incoming coach	Date of appointment	Ref.
Gokulam Kerala B	(Portugal) Paulo Jorge Santos	Contract finished	1 July 2023		Pre-season		(India) Baiju GS	20 August 2023	
Real Malabar FC	(India) Vinu Jose	Contract finished	1 October 2023		Pre-season		(India) Shinoj Madathil	1 November 2023	
FC Areekode	(India) VP Suneer	Contract finished	1 October 2023		Pre-season				
Little Flower FA	(India) Cleofas Alex	Contract finished	1 October 2023		Pre-season		(India) Boniface M	1 December 2023	

== Venues ==
Stadium	Capacity	Location	No of Matches
Jawahar Stadium	30,000	Kannur	63
Kottappady Stadium	10,000	Malappuram	36
Maharaja's College Ground	20,000	Kochi	4
EMS Stadium	50,000	Kozhikode	3
Thrissur Corporation Stadium	20,000	Thrissur	1
Sports Council Ground	5,000	Ernakulam	1

== Group stage ==
=== Group A ===
Pos	Team	Pld	W	D	L	GF	GA	GD	Pts	
1	Kerala United FC	9	7	2	0	26	7	+19	23	Advanced to the Final Round
2	SAT Tirur	9	7	1	1	21	13	+8	22	Advanced to the Final Round
3	Wayanad United FC	9	5	2	2	16	6	+10	17 (Note: Ranked on head-to-head points: Wayanad United FC 3, Gokulam Kerala 'B' 0.)	Advanced to the Final Round
4	Gokulam Kerala 'B'	9	5	2	2	22	9	+13	17	
5	Real Malabar FC	9	4	2	3	16	13	+3	14	
6	Devagiri College	9	3	2	4	11	12	−1	11	
7	FC Areekode	9	3	2	4	10	13	−3	11	
8	FC Kerala	9	2	0	7	12	27	−15	6	
9	BASCO FC	9	1	1	7	12	34	−22	4	
10	LUCA SC	9	0	2	7	3	15	−12	2	

Source: The Away End

=== Group B ===
Pos	Team	Pld	W	D	L	GF	GA	GD	Pts	
1	Kerala Police FC	9	9	0	0	30	2	+28	27	Advanced to the Final Round
2	Muthoot FA	9	6	0	3	24	6	+18	18	Advanced to the Final Round
3	KSEB	9	5	0	4	23	11	+12	15	Advanced to the Final Round
4	Golden Threads FC	9	5	0	4	23	14	+9	15	
5	Kovalam FC	9	4	2	3	16	11	+5	14	
6	Kerala Blasters FC 'B'	9	4	1	4	18	14	+4	13	
7	Parappur FC	9	4	0	5	16	21	−5	12	
8	Little Flower FA	9	3	2	4	27	24	+3	11	
9	SAI Kollam	9	1	2	6	9	26	−17	5	
10	MK Sporting Club	9	0	1	8	3	60	−57	1	

Source: The Away End

== Championship round ==
=== Super Six ===
Pos	Team	Pld	W	D	L	GF	GA	GD	Pts	
1	Kerala Police	5	4	1	0	9	1	+8	13	Advanced to Semi Finals
2	Kerala United	5	3	0	2	6	5	+1	9	Advanced to Semi Finals
3	Muthoot FA	5	2	2	1	5	3	+2	8	Advanced to Semi Finals
4	SAT Tirur	5	2	0	3	8	13	−5	6	Advanced to Semi Finals
5	Wayanad United	5	1	1	3	4	8	−4	4	
6	KSEB	5	1	0	4	6	9	−3	3	

Source: KFA

=== Matches ===
27 January 2024	Muthoot FA	1-1	Wayanad United	Kannur
16:00 IST	Adnan 25'		Abhinash 38'	Stadium: Jawahar Stadium; Man of the Match: Akhil K (Wayanad United)

27 January 2024	SAT	0-5	Kerala Police	Kannur
18:30 IST			Firos 20'; Sajeesh 29', 49', 72', 89'	Stadium: Jawahar Stadium; Man of the Match: Sajeesh (Kerala Police)

28 January 2024	KSEB	1-2	Kerala United	Kannur
18:30 IST	Crispin 21'		38'; Umar Mukthar 45+5'	Stadium: Jawahar Stadium; Man of the Match: Sreejith Kallingal(Kerala United)

29 January 2024	Muthoot FA	3-0	SAT	Kannur
16:00 IST	Ajay 21', 67'; Salahudheen 69'			Stadium: Jawahar Stadium; Man of the Match: Ajay Krishnan (Muthoot)

29 January 2024	Kerala Police	1-0	Wayanad United	Kannur
18:30 IST	Sajeesh 47'			Stadium: Jawahar Stadium; Man of the Match: Sajeesh (Kerala Police)

31 January 2024	KSEB	0-1	Kerala Police	Kannur
16:00 IST			Ashfak Asif 59'	Stadium: Jawahar Stadium; Man of the Match: Ashfak Asif (Kerala Police)

31 January 2024	Kerala United	1-0	Muthoot FA	Kannur
18:30 IST	Abdu Raheem 85'			Stadium: Jawahar Stadium; Man of the Match: Abdu Raheem (Kerala United)

1 February 2024	Wayanad United	2-1	SAT	Kannur
18:30 IST	Ameen 19'; Arunlal 63'		Rahul KP 81'	Stadium: Jawahar Stadium; Man of the Match: Muhammed Ameen (Wayanad United)

2 February 2024	Kerala United	0-1	Kerala Police	Kannur
16:00 IST			Jamshid 45+2'	Stadium: Jawahar Stadium

2 February 2024	KSEB	0-1	Muthoot FA	Kannur
18:30 IST			Arjun 1'	Stadium: Jawahar Stadium

4 February 2024	Wayanad United	0-3	KSEB	Kannur
16:00 IST			John Paul 75'; Nijo 78'; Sreeraj 81'	Stadium: Jawahar Stadium

4 February 2024	SAT	2-1	Kerala United	Kannur
18:30 IST	Thasleem 68'; Yasin 90+3'		Wiliam 78' (pen.)	Stadium: Jawahar Stadium

5 February 2024	Kerala Police	1-1	Muthoot FA	Kannur
18:30 IST	Jamshid 84'		Ajmal 81'	Stadium: Jawahar Stadium

6 February 2024	Wayanad United	1-2	Kerala United	Kannur
16:00 IST	Ameen 33'		Vanlalmalsawma 50'; Umar Mukthar 75'	Stadium: Jawahar Stadium

6 February 2024	SAT	5-2	KSEB	Kannur
18:30 IST	Nisham 41', 90+8'; Yadhu 51', 61'; Basheer 78'		Arjun 65' (pen.); Sreeraj 74'	Stadium: Jawahar Stadium

=== Semifinals ===
8 February 2024
16:00 IST

Kerala Police	0–2	SAT Tirur
		Fabeel 74'; Mahdi 76'

Jawahar Stadium, Kannur

8 February 2024
19:00 IST

Kerala United	2-0	Muthoot FA
Muheeb 2'; Lalsiem 64'

Jawahar Stadium, Kannur

=== Final ===
11 February 2024
19:00 IST

SAT Tirur	1–3	Kerala United
Yadhu		Lalsiem 90+3' (pen.); Vanlalmalsawma 90+8'; Muheeb 90+9'

Jawahar Stadium, Kannur

== Statistics ==
=== Top scorers ===
Rank	Player	Team	Goals
1	Salahudheen Adnan	Muthoot FA	11
2	Muhammed Ashar NA	Golden Threads FC	10
3	Sajeesh	Kerala Police FC	9
4	Shijin Thadhayouse	Gokulam Kerala B	8
5	Firos K	Kerala Police FC	7
5	Rahul KP	SAT Tirur	7
5	Sreeraj	KSEB	7
5	Lalsiem Chongoloi	Kerala United	7
9	Aboobacker Dilshad	Real Malabar FC	6
9	Sreenath	Wayanad United	6

=== Hat-tricks ===
Player	For	Against	Result	Date	Ref
Shijin T	Gokulam Kerala B	BASCO FC	6-2	7 December 2023	
Junain Kadvalath	Muthoot FA	KSEB	3-2	7 December 2023	
Naseef P	FC Areekode	FC Kerala	4-0	9 December 2023	
Muhammed Ashar NA	Golden Threads FC	Parappur FC	7-0	14 December 2023	
Firos K	Kerala Police FC	SAI Kollam	5-0	15 December 2023	
Lalsiem	Kerala United	Basco FC	6-0	17 December 2023	
Shijin T	Gokulam Kerala B	LUCA SC	3-0	8 January 2024	
Sreenath	Wayanad United	Gokulam Kerala B	4-0	12 January 2024	
Crispin	KSEB	MK Sporting	9-0	13 January 2024	
John Paul	KSEB	MK Sporting	9-0	13 January 2024	
Sanu	LIFFA	MK Sporting	13-0	19 January 2024	
Hashir	LIFFA	MK Sporting	13-0	19 January 2024	
Salahudheen ^{7}	Muthoot FA	MK Sporting	9-0	23 January 2024	
Sajeesh ^{4}	Kerala Police FC	SAT Tirur	5-0	27 January 2024	

Notes

^{7} Player scored 7 goals, ^{4} Player scored 4 goals

== Season awards ==
Award	Winner	Team
Player of the league	(India) Muhamed Mahdi	SAT
Golden boot	(India) Salahudheen Adnan	Muthoot FA
Golden glove	(India) Mohammed Azhar	Kerala Police FC
Best defender	(India) Sanju G	Kerala Police FC
Fair Play Award	Gokulam Kerala FC B	/

== See also ==
- 2023–24 Indian State Leagues
