= 2022–23 Kerala Premier League =

10th season of Kerala Premier League

Kerala Premier League
- Season: 2022–23
- Dates: 24 November 2022 – 19 March 2023
- Champions: Kerala United (1st title)
- Promoted: Kerala United
- Matches: 90
- Goals: 299 (3.32 per match)
- Top goalscorer: Samuel Mensa Konney (10 goals)
- Biggest win: KSEB 9-1 Payyannur College
- Highest scoring: KSEB 9-1 Payyannur College
- Longest winning run: Gokulam Kerala FC B (6 matches)
- Longest unbeaten run: Wayanad United FC (10 matches)
- Longest winless run: LUCA SC (7 matches)
- Longest losing run: LUCA SC (7 matches)

The 2022–23 Kerala Premier League was the tenth season of the Kerala Premier League. The regular season featured 22 teams and played in multiple venues.

== Qualifiers ==
Promoted teams:

- Payyannur College
- Kerala Blasters B
- FC Kerala

== Teams ==
KFA

	Team	Head coach	City	Sponsor
1	BASCO FC	(India) E. Shivamani	Malappuram	Janatha TMT
2	Don Bosco FA	(India) Alphonse Jose	Kochi	
3	FC Areekode	(India) V. P. Suneer	Areekode	Essa Group
4	FC Kerala	(India) Britto Clemmi	Thrissur	Yogakshemam Loans
5	Gokulam Kerala FC B	(Portugal) Paulo Jorge Santos	Kozhikode	Gokulam Group
6	Golden Threads FC	(India) Soly Xavier	Kochi	Wayna Water
7	Kerala Blasters B	(Poland) Tomasz Tchórz	Kochi	Byju's
8	Kerala Police	(India) Shimjith	Malappuram	Odyssia
9	Kerala United FC	(Nigeria) (India) Saheed Ramon	Manjeri	Micro Health Laboratories
10	KSEB	(India) P. B. Ramesh	Trivandrum	MADRE Integrated Engineering
11	Kovalam Football Club	(India) Ebin Rose	Kovalam	Federal Bank
12	Little Flower FA	(India) Cleofas Alex	Trivandrum	Odysdia
13	Luca Soccer Club	(India) Navas Luca	Kondotty	Abreco Freight
14	MK Sporting Club	(India) Satheevan Balan	Alappuzha	M. K. Group
15	Muthoot FA	(India) K. Anees	Kondotty	Muthoot Pappachan Group
16	Parappur FC	(India) Sanjoy Kumar Dey	Parappur	South Indian Bank
17	Payyannur College		Payyannur	Tago
18	Real Malabar FC	(India) Vinu Jose	Kondotty	EDEX
19	SAT Tirur	(India) Sunil Kumar	Tirur	AB Bismi
20	SAI Kollam	(India) Deepak Boro	Kollam	
21	Travancore Royals FC	(India) Samuel Geevarghese	Trivandrum	Vismayasmax Animations
22	Wayanad United FC	(India) Sanush Raj	Kalpetta	Wagonmart

=== Number of teams by region ===
No. of teams	Districts	Team(s)
7	Malappuram	BASCO FC, Kerala United FC, Kerala Police, Luca Soccer Club, FC Areekode, SAT FC, Real Malabar FC, Muthoot FA
4	Trivandrum	Kovalam Football Club, KSEB, Little Flower FA, Travancore Royals FC
4	Ernakulam	Golden Threads FC, Don Bosco FA, Kerala Blasters B
2	Thrissur	Parappur FC, FC Kerala
1	Kozhikode	Gokulam Kerala FC B
1	Wayanad	Wayanad United FC
1	Kollam	SAI Kollam
1	Kannur	Payyannur College
1	Alappuzha	MK Sporting Club

=== Managerial changes ===
Team	Outgoing coach	Manner of departure	Date of vacancy	Ref.	Round	Table	Incoming coach	Date of appointment	Ref.
FC Areekode	(India) Muhammed Ashiq	New club (Rajasthan United FC)	1 July 2022		Pre-season		(India) VP Suneer	5 August 2022	
Kerala United FC	(India) Bino George	New club (East Bengal)	1 July 2022		Pre-season		(Nigeria) Saheed Ramon		
Gokulam Kerala FC B	(India) Rajeev Ponnanthari	Contract Finished	1 July 2022		Pre-season		(Portugal) Paulo Jorge Santos	1 August 2022	
Kerala Police	(India) I. M. Vijayan	Contract Finished	1 July 2022		Pre-season		(India) Shimjith	1 August 2022	

=== Venues ===
Stadium	Capacity	Location
EMS Stadium	80,000	Calicut
Kotappady Stadium	20,000	Malappuram
Maharaja's College Ground	20,000	Kochi
Thrissur Corporation Stadium	20,000	Thrissur
Maravayal Sports Complex		Kalpetta

== Foreign players ==
	Team	Player 1	Player 2	Player 3	Player 4
1	MK Sporting Club				
2	BASCO FC	(Cameroon) Djougo Foku Mike	(Cameroon) Jacque Abeau		
3	Don Bosco FA	(Ivory Coast) Karomoko	(Nigeria) John Chidi		
4	FC Areekode	(Ghana) Wisdom			
5	FC Kerala	(Ghana) Charles Offei	(Nigeria) Abayomi Oludeyi		
6	Gokulam Kerala FC B	(Cameroon) Dodi Alphead Ndo	(Ghana) Samuel Mensah Konney	(Nigeria) Oluwaunmi Somide	(Nigeria) Godfrey West Omodu
7	Golden Threads FC	(Burkina Faso) Christian Ouedraogo	(Ghana) Patrick Yeboah	(Ghana) Joseph Tetteh	
8	Kerala Blasters B				
9	Kerala Police				
10	Kerala United FC	(Ivory Coast) Ouattara Sie	(Ghana) Yusif Afful	(Ghana) Benjamin Arthur	(Nigeria) Ezekial Oroh
11	Kovalam Football Club				
12	KSEB				
13	Little Flower FA				
14	Luca Soccer Club				
15	Payyannur College				
16	Muthoot FA	(Ghana) Alex Yamoah			
17	Parappur FC				
18	SAI Kollam				
19	Sports Academy Tirur				
20	Travancore Royals FC				
21	Real Malabar FC				
22	Wayanad United FC	(Ghana) Gbolo Abdulai	(Ghana) Isahak Nuhu Seidu	(Nigeria) Kafandorashidan Haruna	

== Group stage ==
=== Group A ===
Pos	Team	Pld	W	D	L	GF	GA	GD	Pts	
1	Wayanad United FC	7	5	1	1	10	3	+7	16	Advance to the Final Round
2	Kerala United FC	7	4	3	0	21	8	+13	15	Advance to the Final Round
3	SA TIRUR	7	4	3	0	11	5	+6	15	
4	FC Areekode	7	2	4	1	17	13	+4	10	
5	Real Malabar FC	7	2	2	3	11	14	−3	8	
6	BASCO FC	7	2	1	4	13	17	−4	7	
7	MK Sporting Club	7	1	2	4	6	11	−5	5	
8	Luca Soccer Club	7	0	0	7	4	18	−14	0	

Source: KFA

=== Group B ===
Pos	Team	Pld	W	D	L	GF	GA	GD	Pts	
1	Gokulam Kerala FC B	6	6	0	0	15	4	+11	18	Advance to the Final Round
2	Kerala Police	6	3	2	1	7	4	+3	11	Advance to the Final Round
3	Golden Threads FC	6	3	0	3	11	9	+2	9	
4	Muthoot FA	6	2	2	2	9	9	0	8	
5	Parappur FC	6	2	2	2	9	9	0	8	
6	FC Kerala	6	0	2	4	9	14	−5	2	
7	Don Bosco FA	6	0	2	4	5	15	−10	2	

Source: KFA

=== Group C ===
Pos	Team	Pld	W	D	L	GF	GA	GD	Pts	
1	Kerala Blasters B	6	4	1	1	19	10	+9	13	Advance to the Final Round
2	Kovalam	6	4	1	1	12	4	+8	13	Advance to the Final Round
3	KSEB	6	4	1	1	24	8	+16	13	
4	SAI Kollam	6	3	2	1	17	7	+10	11	
5	Little Flower FA	6	2	1	3	10	13	−3	7	
6	Payyannur College	6	1	0	5	8	25	−17	3	
7	Travancore Royals	6	0	0	6	2	25	−23	0	

Source: KFA

== Championship round ==
=== Super Six ===
Pos	Team	Pld	W	D	L	GF	GA	GD	Pts	
1	Wayanad United FC	5	3	2	0	8	3	+5	11	Advanced to Semi Finals
2	Kerala Police (A)	5	3	1	1	10	7	+3	10	
3	Gokulam Kerala B	5	2	1	2	10	6	+4	7	Advanced to Semi Finals
4	Kerala United (C)	5	2	1	2	8	7	+1	7	Advanced to Semi Finals
5	Kovalam	5	1	1	3	4	10	−6	4	Advanced to Semi Finals
6	Kerala Blasters B	5	0	2	3	2	8	−6	2	

Source: KFA
(A) Withdrew due to participation in the all-India Police Tournament; (C) Champions and Qualification to 2023–24 I-League 3

==== Fixtures ====
Super Six fixtures were announced on 16 February 2023.

20 February 2023	Kerala Police	3–0	Kovalam	Kozhikode
16:00 IST				Stadium: EMS Stadium; Man of the Match: Sajeesh E.

21 February 2023	Wayanad United FC	2–0	Gokulam Kerala B	Kozhikode
16:00 IST				Stadium: EMS Stadium; Man of the Match: Sreejith

23 February 2023	Kerala Police	2–0	Kerala Blasters B	Kozhikode
16:00 IST				Stadium: EMS Stadium; Man of the Match: Sajeesh E.

24 February 2023	Kovalam	3–0	Kerala United	Malappuram
16:00 IST				Stadium: Kotappady Stadium; Man of the Match: Amal Thomas

26 February 2023	Gokulam Kerala B	2–3	Kerala Police	Kozhikode
16:00 IST				Stadium: EMS Stadium; Man of the Match: Calvin Barretto

27 February 2023	Kerala Blasters B	1–1	Wayanad United FC	Malappuram
16:00 IST				Stadium: Kotappady Stadium

28 February 2023	Kerala United	4–1	Kerala Police	Malappuram
16:00 IST				Stadium: Kotappady Stadium

1 March 2023	Gokulam Kerala B	4–0	Kovalam	Kozhikode
16:00 IST				Stadium: EMS Stadium

2 March 2023	Wayanad United FC	1–1	Kerala Police	Malappuram
16:00 IST				Stadium: Kotappady Stadium

3 March 2023	Kerala United	2–0	Kerala Blasters B	Malappuram
16:00 IST				Stadium: Kotappady Stadium

4 March 2023	Kovalam	0–2	Wayanad United FC	Kozhikode
16:00 IST				Stadium: EMS Stadium

6 March 2023	Kerala United	1–1	Gokulam Kerala B	Malappuram
16:00 IST				Stadium: Kotappady Stadium

7 March 2023	Kerala Blasters B	1–1	Kovalam	Kozhikode
16:00 IST				Stadium: EMS Stadium

9 March 2023	Kerala United	1–2	Wayanad United FC	Malappuram
16:00 IST				Stadium: Kotappady Stadium

10 March 2023	Gokulam Kerala B	2–0	Kerala Blasters B	Kozhikode
16:00 IST				Stadium: EMS Stadium

Semifinals

13 March 2023
19:30 IST

Kerala United	3–0	Wayanad United FC
Ezekiel 13'; Manoj 72'; Vanlalmalsawma 90+8'

M. K. Jinachandran Memorial District Stadium, Kalpetta
15 March 2023
19:30 IST

Kerala United	0–1	Wayanad United FC
		Nuhu 74'

M. K. Jinachandran Memorial District Stadium, Kalpetta

14 March 2023
19:30 IST

Kovalam	0–1	Gokulam Kerala B
		Samuel 90+4'

M K Jinachandran Memorial District Stadium, Kalpetta
16 March 2023
19:30 IST

Gokulam Kerala B	3–0	Kovalam
Kelvin 2'; Samuel 45+4' 67'

M K Jinachandran Memorial District Stadium, Kalpetta

Final

19 March 2023	Kerala United	1–0	Gokulam Kerala B	Kalpetta
19:30 IST	Akhil J. Chandran OG 78'			Stadium: M. K. Jinachandran Memorial District Stadium

== Statistics ==
=== Top scorers ===
As of 19 March 2023

No	Player	Club	Goals
1	(Ghana) Samuel Mensah Konney	Gokulam Kerala B	10
	(Nigeria) Ezekial Orah	Kerala United	
Golden boot	(Ghana) Samuel Mensah Konney	Gokulam Kerala B	
Golden glove	(India) Pradeesh V.	Kerala United	
Best defender	(India) Akhil J Chandran	Gokulam Kerala B	

== See also ==
- 2022–23 Indian State Leagues
