= 2019–20 Kerala Premier League =

7th season of Kerala Premier League

Kerala Premier League
- Season: 2019–20 (7th Season)
- Champions: Kerala Blasters FC Reserves (1st title)
- Runner up: Gokulam Kerala F.C.
- Top goalscorer: (Ghana) Issahak Nuhu Seidu Golden Threads (Senegal) Kamara EO SAT (8 Goals)
- Biggest home win: 8–1 Gokulam vs Luca (03 February 2020)
- Biggest away win: 0–4 FC Kerala vs Kerala Police (29 January 2020)
- Highest scoring: 8–1 Gokulam vs Luca (03 February 2020)
- Longest winning run: Gokulam (7 games)
- Longest unbeaten run: Gokulam (8 games)
- Longest winless run: Kovalam FC (5 games)
- Longest losing run: Kovalam FC (5 games)
- All statistics correct as of 16 April 2019.

The 2019–20 Kerala Premier League Season was the seventh season of the Kerala Premier League. The season featured 10 teams which was divided into 2 groups and were played on a home-and-away format. The season kicked off on 15 December 2019. Former participants Kozhikode Quartz FC, SBI Kerala, RFC Kochi, FC Thrissur withdrew from the league due to financial problems. Meanwhile, Kannur City FC withdrew mid-way throughout the tournament due to some technical issues. Kerala Blasters FC beat Gokulam Kerala F.C. in the finals and lifted their first KPL Title.

== Teams ==
Kochi City FC, Shooter Padne and Indian Navy withdrawn from the league. To these vacancies Kannur City FC and Mar Athanasius FA were selected by playing the qualifiers. Luca Soccer Club joined the league through corporate entry after losing in the qualifier.

=== Stadiums and locations ===
Team	Stadium	Capacity
Golden Threads	Ambedkar Stadium, Ernakulam	10,000
FC Kerala	Thrissur Municipal Corporation Stadium	15,000
Kerala Police	Kotappady Stadium	10,000
Gokulam Kerala FC	EMS Stadium	80,000
MA College	MA College Stadium	3000
Sports Academy Tirur	Rajiv Gandhi Municipal Stadium, Tirur	5000
Kerala Blasters FC	Sports Council Ground, Panampilly Nagar, Kochi	500
Luca Soccer Club	Kotappady Stadium	10,000
Kovalam FC	University Stadium, Thiruvananthapuram	20,000
Kannur City FC	University College Stadium, Kannur	10,000

=== Head coaches ===
Club	Head Coach	Sponsor
Golden Threads	(India) Sumesh	WAYNA Packaged Drinking Water
Kannur City FC	(Nigeria) Clifford Chukwuma	
FC Kerala	(India) TG Purushottaman	Yogakshemam Loans
Mar Athanasius College	(India) Haary Benny	
Luca Soccer Club	(India) Navas Luca & (Scotland) John Cooper	
Gokulam Kerala FC	(India) Rajeev P	Gokulam Group
Sports Academy Tirur	(India) M Pethambaran	AB Bismi
Kerala Blasters FC	(India) Renjith T. A	Muthoot Group
Kerala Police	(India) Sunil	
Kovalam FC	(India) Ebin Rose	Federal Bank

=== Foreign players ===
Clubs can sign maximum four players but only three is allowed in the playing eleven.

Club	Player 1	Player 2	Player 3	Player 4
Golden Threads	(Ghana) Issahak Nuhu Seidu	-	-	-
FC Kerala	(Ivory Coast) Cyrille Brohiri			
Kannur City FC			-	-
Gokulam Kerala FC	(Nigeria) Daniel Bartholomew	(Nigeria) Lucky Emmanuel	(Ghana) Stephen Abeiku	
Kovalam FC				
Luca Soccer Club	-	-	-	-
Sports Academy Tirur	(Senegal) Kamara E.O	(Ghana) Menshach Nii Akramah Mensah	-	-
Kerala Blasters FC	-	-	-	-
MA College				
Kerala Police	-	-	-	-

== Qualifiers ==
Kerala Premier League Qualifier - KPLQ

=== Fixtures and results ===
Cancelled Matches

21 November 2019	Kannur City FC	1-0	Luca Soccer Club	Kozhikode
09:00 IST	Abhijith 48'			Stadium: Devagiri St. Josephs College Stadium

27 November 2019	MA College	8-0	Travancore Royals FC	Ernakulam
19:00 IST	Fahad 4', 47'; Jayir AK 42'; Emmanuel P 52'; Amal Das 71'; Fajil 81'; Deepak Raj 85', 86'			Stadium: Ambedkar Stadium

== Group stage ==
=== Group A ===
Pos	Team	Pld	W	D	L	GF	GA	GD	Pts	Qualification
1	Gokulam Kerala F.C.	8	6	1	1	25	9	+16	19	Advance to Semi-finals
2	Kerala Blasters FC	8	3	2	3	13	10	+3	11	Advance to Semi-finals
3	Luca Soccer Club	8	2	4	2	11	15	−4	10	
4	Golden Threads	8	2	3	3	10	11	−1	9	
5	Kovalam FC	8	1	2	5	5	19	−14	5	

Source: KFA

==== Fixtures and results ====
Cancelled Matches

15 December 2019	Gokulam Kerala FC	1-0	Kerala Blasters FC	Kozhikode
15:30 IST	Luminulan Dougal 67' (o.g.)			Stadium: EMS Stadium; Attendance: 4000

18 December 2019	Golden Threads F.C.	1-1	Kovalam FC	Kochi
15:30 IST	Salahudheen adnan 88'		Nahaz AK 14'	Stadium: Ambedkar Stadium

22 December 2019	Kerala Blasters FC	5-3	LUCA SC	Kochi
15:30 IST	Basith 16'; Asif 21'; Kharpan 53'; Bodo 71', 90+2'		Shanavas 67'; AkmalShan 75'; Arjun 90+5'	Stadium: Sports Council Ground, Panampilly Nagar, Kochi

23 December 2019	Kovalam FC	1-4	Gokulam Kerala FC	Thiruvananthapuram
15:30 IST	Sujith 22'		Vishnu 14'; Shihad 59', 82', 87'	Stadium: Kovalam FC Stadium

29 December 2019	Golden Threads F.C.	1-0	Kerala Blasters FC	Kochi
15:30 IST	ISSAHAK 28'			Stadium: Ambedkar Stadium

30 December 2019	LUCA SC	1-0	Gokulam Kerala FC	Malappuram
15:30 IST	Akmal 75'			Stadium: Kotappady Stadium

4 January 2020	Kovalam FC	1-3	Kerala Blasters FC	Thiruvananthapuram
15:30 IST	Jaison 53'		Kharpan 45+4' 90+2'; Bodo 79'	Stadium: Kovalam FC Stadium

11 January 2020	Gokulam Kerala FC	4-3	Golden Threads F.C.	Kozhikode
15:30 IST	Thahir zaman 21'; Emil benni 28'; Shabas 70'; Gifty 75'		Nishad 43', 62'; Issahak 59'	Stadium: EMS Stadium

12 January 2020	LUCA SC	1-1	Kerala Blasters FC	Malappuram
15:30 IST	Akbar 87'		Kharpan 49'	Stadium: Kotappady Stadium

15 January 2020	Kovalam FC	0-2	Golden Threads F.C.	Thiruvananthapuram
15:30 IST			ISSAHAK 41', 85'	Stadium: Kovalam FC Stadium

18 January 2020	LUCA SC	1-1	Golden Threads F.C.	Malappuram
15:30 IST	akmal 1'		Issahak 74'	Stadium: Kotappady Stadium

19 January 2020	Kerala Blasters FC	0-1	Kovalam FC	Kochi
15:30 IST			Nahas 65'	Stadium: Sports Council Ground, Panampilly Nagar, Kochi

28 January 2020	Golden Threads F.C.	1-2	Gokulam Kerala FC	Kochi
15:30 IST	Issahak 10'		Beautin 44'; Emil 77'	Stadium: Ambedkar Stadium, Ernakulam

29 January 2020	LUCA SC	4-0	Kovalam FC	Malappuram
15:30 IST	Akbar (* 24), 31', 37', 42'			Stadium: Kotappady Stadium

2 February 2020	Kerala Blasters FC	3-1	Golden Threads F.C.	Kochi
15:30 IST	pragyan 13'; Kabil 35'; Nihal 76'		Issahak 45'	Stadium: Sports Council Ground, Panampilly Nagar, Kochi

3 February 2020	Gokulam Kerala FC	8-1	LUCA SC	Kozhikode
15:30 IST	LUCKY 43'; Gofty 45+1'; Stephen 54', 76'; Zula 61', 86' Daniel 68'; Emil 72'		Dabas 42'	Stadium: EMS Stadium

7 February 2020	Golden Threads F.C.	1-1	LUCA SC	Kochi
15:30 IST	Issahak 6'		Arjun 75'	Stadium: Ambedkar Stadium, Ernakulam

17 February 2020	Kovalam FC	0-0	LUCA SC	Thiruvananthapuram
15:30 IST				Stadium: University Stadium, Thiruvananthapuram

24 February 2020	Kerala Blasters FC	1-1	Gokulam Kerala FC	Kochi
15:30 IST	Mahesh 80'		Nishad 55'	Stadium: Sports Council Ground, Panampilly Nagar, Kochi

26 February 2020	Gokulam Kerala FC	5-1	Kovalam FC	Kozhikode
15:30 IST	Shihad 3'; Stephen 23'; Emil 44', 68', 89'		Beniton 85'	Stadium: EMS Stadium

=== Group B ===
Pos	Team	Pld	W	D	L	GF	GA	GD	Pts	Qualification
1	Sports Academy Tirur	6	4	1	1	8	3	+5	13	Advance to Semi-finals
2	Kerala Police	6	2	2	2	7	7	0	8	Advance to Semi-finals
3	MA College	6	2	1	3	6	7	−1	7	
4	FC Kerala	6	2	0	4	4	8	−4	6	
5	Kannur City FC	0	0	0	0	0	0	0	0	Withdrawn

Source: KFA

==== Fixtures and results ====
Cancelled Matches

15 December 2019	Sports Academy Tirur	4-3	Kannur City FC	Tirur
15:30 IST	Kamara E.O 30', 64', 70', 72'		Muhammad Faisal 12'; Sirajuddin 61'; Abhijith 90+3'	Stadium: Rajiv Gandhi Municipal Stadium, Tirur

22 December 2019	Kannur City FC	1-1	MA College	Kannur
15:30 IST	Sirajuddin 8'		Fahad 81'	Stadium: University College ground Kannur

29 December 2019	FC Kerala	2-0	Kannur City FC	Thrissur
15:30 IST	Mousoof 18'; Roshan 50'			Stadium: Thrissur Municipal Corporation Stadium

30 December 2019	MA College	1-0	Sports Academy Tirur	Kolancherry
15:30 IST	Fajil 81'			Stadium: MA College Ground

4 January 2020	Kerala Police	2-0	Kannur City FC	Malappuram
15:30 IST	Firoz 64', 90+4'			Stadium: Kotappady Stadium

11 January 2020	Sports Academy Tirur	2-0	FC Kerala	Tirur
15:30 IST	Faisal 52'; Kamara EO 71'			Stadium: Rajiv Gandhi Municipal Stadium, Tirur

12 January 2020	MA College	4-0	Kannur City FC	Kolancherry
15:30 IST	Sufaid 40', 83', 90+2'; Fahad 43'			Stadium: MA College Ground

15 January 2020	Kerala Police	1-0	FC Kerala	Malappuram
15:30 IST	Anish 24'			Stadium: Kotappady Stadium

18 January 2020	MA College	0-2	FC Kerala	Kolancherry
15:30 IST			Nikhil 87'; Roshan 89'	Stadium: MA College Ground

26 January 2020	Kerala Police	1-1	MA College	Malappuram
15:30 IST	Anikuttan 86'		Fahad 45'	Stadium: Kotappady Stadium

29 January 2020	FC Kerala	0-4	Kerala Police	Thrissur
15:30 IST			Thahir Jimshad 16', 27'; Bijesh 77'; Sujil 83'	Stadium: Thrissur Municipal Corporation Stadium

2 February 2020	MA College	3-0	Kerala Police	Kolancherry
15:30 IST	Amaldas 30'; Deepak 42'; Afasal 54'			Stadium: MA College Ground

6 February 2020	Sports Academy Tirur	2-0	Kerala Police	Malappuram
15:30 IST	Kamara EO 49'; Rishad 85'			Stadium: Rajiv Gandhi Municipal Stadium, Tirur

16 February 2020	Sports Academy Tirur	2-1	MA College	Malappuram
15:30 IST	Fasalu Rahman 48'; Arshad 66'		Arshal 18' (o.g.)	Stadium: Rajiv Gandhi Municipal Stadium, Tirur

19 February 2020	FC Kerala	2-0	MA College	Thrissur
15:30 IST	Cyrile 41'; Abhishek 78'			Stadium: Thrissur Municipal Corporation Stadium

22 February 2020	FC Kerala	0-1	Sports Academy Tirur	Thrissur
15:30 IST			Kamara 27'	Stadium: Thrissur Municipal Corporation Stadium

26 February 2020	Kerala Police	1-1	Sports Academy Tirur	Malappuram
15:30 IST	Akhiljith 73'		Thabsir 62'	Stadium: Kotappady Stadium

== Knockout stage ==
Semi-finals
A1	Gokulam Kerala F.C.	4
B2	Kerala Police FC	0
B1	SAT Tirur	0(4)
A2	Kerala Blasters FC Reserves	0(5)

Final
Gokulam Kerala F.C.	3(5)
Kerala Blasters FC Reserves	3(6)

=== Fixtures and results ===
Semi-Finals

1 March 2020	Gokulam Kerala FC	4-0	Kerala Police	Kozhikode
4:00 PM (IST)	Daniel 9'; Nimshad 21', 24'; Lalmuanzova 33'			Stadium: EMS Stadium Kozhikode

1 March 2020	Sports Academy Tirur	0-0 (4-5 p)	Kerala Blasters FC	Tirur
4:00 PM (IST)				Stadium: Rajiv Gandhi Stadium Tirur
	Penalties
	Penalty scored Penalty missed		Penalty scored

Final

7 March 2020	Kerala Blasters FC	3-3 (6-5 p)	Gokulam Kerala FC	Kozhikode
6:00 PM (IST)	Ronaldo 13', 64'; Samuel 22'		Daniel 6', 41'; Lalmuanzova 60'	Stadium: EMS Stadium Kozhikode
	Penalties
	Mahesh (penalty scored); Samuel (penalty scored); Pragyan (penalty scored); Basith (penalty scored); Ronaldo (penalty scored); Lun (penalty scored)		Lalmuanzova (penalty scored); Zaman (penalty scored); Jasim (penalty scored); Ganeshan (penalty scored); Stephan (penalty scored); Emil (penalty missed)

== Season statistics ==
=== Scoring ===
As of 12 January 2020

==== Top scorers ====
No	Player	Club	Goals
1	(Ghana) Issahak Nuhu Seidu	Golden Threads F.C.	8
1	(Senegal) Kamara EO	Sports Academy Tirur	8
3	(India) Emil Benny	Gokulam Kerala FC	6
4	(India) Akbar	Luca Soccer Club	5
5	(India) Shaiborlang Kharpan	Kerala Blasters FC	4
6	(India) Bodo	Kerala Blasters FC	3
6	(India) Shihad	Gokulam Kerala FC	3
6	(India) Sufaid	Gokulam Kerala FC	3
