= Gokulam Kerala FC Reserves and Academy =

Indian association football club

Gokulam Kerala Reserves
- Full name: Gokulam Kerala Football Club Reserves and Academy
- Nickname: The Malabarians
- Short name: GKFC
- Founded: January 2017; 9 years ago (as Gokulam FC)
- Ground: EMS Stadium
- Capacity: 50,000
- Owner: Sree Gokulam Group
- President: V. C. Praveen
- Head coach: Varun Mehta
- League: Kerala Premier League
- Website: www.gokulamkeralafc.com
Home colours	Away colours

Gokulam Kerala FC Reserves and Academy (Gokulam Kerala FC B) is the reserve team of Gokulam Kerala, that competes in Kerala Premier League. They won the Kerala Premier League title in 2017–18 and 2020–21 and were runners-up in 2018–19, 2019–20 and 2022–23.

== Reserve team squad ==
Note: Flags indicate national team as defined under FIFA eligibility rules; some limited exceptions apply. Players may hold more than one non-FIFA nationality.

No.	Pos.	Nation	Player
4	DF	IND	Bavjith TK
7	FW	IND	Muhammed Bilal
8	MF	IND	Bibin Boban
10	MF	IND	Stalin Stephen
11	FW	IND	Jemsheed Ali
12	DF	IND	Naveen Das
14	MF	IND	Akshay M
18	DF	IND	Laishram Singh Johnson
21	GK	IND	Raysudheen
22	DF	IND	Yashim Malik
24	DF	IND	Wungngayam Muirang
25	FW	IND	Muhammed Risvan
28	DF	IND	Gokul Krishna

No.	Pos.	Nation	Player
29	MF	IND	Fazeen Majeed
30	FW	IND	Muhammed Mahdi
31	FW	IND	Ajay PV
77	FW	IND	Nandhu Krishna
78	GK	IND	Kamaludheen
80	FW	IND	Abdulla KS
—	GK	IND	Amaan Feroz Sheriff
—	DF	IND	Muhammed Saalah
—	DF	IND	Aeibel Mathew Nixon
—	MF	IND	Muhammed Basith
—	MF	IND	Aman Gaikwad
—	FW	IND	Abdul Dinu
—	FW	IND	Adithya V
—	FW	IND	Ganapathy Prasad

== Technical staff ==
=== Current technical staff ===
Role	Name
Head coach	(India) Rajeev Ponnanthari
Technical director	(India) Ranjan Chowdhury
Physio	(India) Noel Saju
Team Manager	(India) Abhinav B
Kit Manager	(India) Midhun A

== Statistics and records ==
Season	KPL
2016—17	Semi Finals
2017—18	Champions
2018—19	Runner-up
2019—20	Runner-up
2020—21	Champions
2021—22	Group Stage
2022—23	Runner-up
2023—24	Group Stage
2024—25	Group Stage
2025—26	Champions

=== Top scorer by season ===
As of 31 May 2026

Season	Player	Goals
2016-17	(India) V P Suhair	5
2017-18	(India) V P Suhair (India) Usman Ashik	4
2018-19	(Ghana) Christian Sabah	6
2019–20	(India) Emil Benny	6
2020–21	(Mali) Saliou Guindo	8
2021–22	(India) Lalrinzuala Lalbiaknia	3
2022–23	(Ghana) Samuel Mensah Koney	10
2023–24	(India) Shijin Thadhayouse	8
2024–25	(India) Shijin Thadhayouse (India) Nandhu Krishna	3
2025–26	(India) Muhammed Bilal	5

== Participations ==
As of 16 November 2024

Year	Tournament	Result	Organizer
2019	(India) Bodousa Cup	Champions	Bodousa Sports Club, Assam
2019	(India) Independence Day Cup	Champions	Nowgong Sports Association, Assam
2019	(India) Mayor's Cup	Runners Up	Corporation, Thiruvananthapuram
2023	(India) Stafford Challenge Cup	Group Stage	Karnataka State Football Association
2024	(India) Sikkim Governor's Gold Cup	Semi Finals	Sikkim Football Association

== Honours ==
=== League ===
- Kerala Premier League
  - Champions (2): 2017–18, 2020–21 2025–26
  - Runners-up (3): 2018–19, 2019–20, 2022–23

=== Cup ===
- Bodousa Cup
  - Champions (1): 2019
- Independence Day Cup
  - Champions (1): 2019
- Mayors Cup
  - Runners-up (1): 2019
- All India Governor's Gold Cup
  - TBD: 2024
