= Patrick Yeboah =

Ghanaian footballer (born 1994)

Personal information
- Date of birth: 14 March 1994 (age 32)
- Place of birth: Kumasi, Ghana
- Height: 1.80 m (5 ft 11 in)
- Position: Defender

Team information
- Current team: Golden Threads FC

Senior career*
Years	Team	Apps	(Gls)
2018–2019	Karela United	2	(0)
2019–2020	Asante Kotoko	5	(0)
2020–2021	Medeama SC	7	(0)
2022	Legon Cities FC	7	(0)
2023–	Golden Threads FC	3	(0)

International career^{‡}
2019–	Ghana	1	(0)
- * Club domestic league appearances and goals as of 18:00, 15 July 2020 (UTC) ‡ National team caps and goals as of 18:00, 15 July 2020 (UTC)

Patrick Yeboah (born 16 March 1994) is a Ghanaian professional footballer who plays as a defender for Golden Threads and the Ghana national team.

== Club career ==
In July 2019, Asante Kotoko signed Yeboah on a three-year contract from Karela United.

== International career ==
On 20 October 2019, Yeboah made his debut for Ghana in a 0–0 draw against Burkina Faso.
