= Kerala United FC =

Indian association football club based in Malappuram

Kerala United
- Full name: Kerala United Football Club
- Nickname: The Hornbills
- Short name: KUFC
- Founded: 1976; 50 years ago (as Quartz FC); 2020; 6 years ago (rebranded as Kerala United FC)
- Ground: Payyanad Stadium
- Capacity: 30,000
- Owner: Abdullah Bin Mosaad Al Saud
- Head coach: Shelbin Francis
- League: Kerala Premier League
Home colours	Away colours	Third colours

Active departments of Kerala United FC
- Football (Men's): Football (Women's)

Kerala United Football Club (formerly Quartz Football Club) is an Indian professional football club based in Malappuram, Kerala.

Founded in 1976 as Calicut Quartz, the club was an amateur and academy side during its early years. In December 2011, they announced intention to turn professional and participated in 2012 I-League 2nd Division, which was then the second tier of Indian club football. The club spent a season in the second division during 2011–12 and later played in the Kerala Premier League. In 2017–18 Kerala Premier League season, they finished as runners-up. They have also competed in the I-League 3.

In 2020, the club underwent a substantial change in ownership as the "United World Group" assumed control. This marked the beginning of a new chapter, accompanied by rebranding of the club as Kerala United FC. The club initially began their training at Seethi Haji Stadium at Edavanna, later moving to Payyanad Stadium.

== History ==
Founded in 1976 as Quartz Football Club in Kozhikode, Kerala and since has been growing up step by step from district to state to national level. The Quartz Academy was incorporated in 2009. In December 2011, they were officially certified by the All India Football Federation to participate in the I-League 2nd Division. For the first time in 2012 I-League 2nd Division, Quartz FC participated but failed to make an impression. They only got one point in the group stage thereby failing to get promotion.

In 2012–13 season, Quartz FC signed I-League players like Rino Anto, Sabas Saleel, K. Noushad, Manoj Manoharan, Sherin Sam, Kamardeep Singh, Suji Kumar, J. Prasad, P.M. Britto, Salil Usman and Ajmaluddin. Club also signed the top-scorer and player of the tournament at the 2012 Santosh Trophy V.V. Farhad. They appointed Assistant coach Bino George of Chirag United Club Kerala. Later withdrew from the 2013 I-League 2nd Division due to financial instability.

Club managed to win Kozhikode District League back to back in 2011 and 2012. Later in 2013–14, Quartz played with their academy side in the very first edition of Kerala Premier League. After making a late entry in 2017–18 Kerala Premier League season, the club finished as runners-up after losing to Gokulam Kerala in final. They had withdrawn from two editions of Kerala Premier League (2016–17, 2018–19) due to financial issues.

"Kerala is known to be the heart of Indian football and when it comes to passion and support, no fan base in India comes close to their love for the beautiful game. Our focus will be on cementing and strengthening the foundations of the club, building an academy and developing homegrown players."

— — Abdullah Al-Ghamdi, CEO of United World Group, after the takeover and rebranding of Kerala United FC.

In November 2020, English Premier League Club Sheffield United have taken over Calicut Quartz and rebranded it as Kerala United FC. United World Group, the umbrella firm holding Sheffield, said in a statement that it envisages to make Kerala United a competitive, community-focused football club playing at the highest level possible in Indian football.

P. Haridas, who owned Calicut Quartz FC, is also the president of the Kozhikode District Football Association (KDFA), said a Premier League club coming to the state will bring major changes to Kerala football. Company director Akshay Das said: "We're looking for an overall development in the state, especially in Malabar."

As Kerala United, they participated in the 2020–21 Kerala Premier League and qualified for the knockout stages after finishing second in the Group-B with 12 points. In the semi-finals, regular time couldn't separate Gokulam Kerala and Kerala United, match ending goalless. They lost 4–2 on penalties at the Thrissur Municipal Corporation Stadium. In that season, they participated in Independence Day Cup in Assam and finished as runners-up, losing to Assam State Electricity Board SC by 4–3 in penalties. In October 2022, Nigerian-born naturalized Indian manager Saheed Ramon was appointed head coach. In 2023, they participated in Stafford Challenge Cup in Bangalore. Kerala United won their first ever Kerala Premier League title in 2022–23, defeating Gokulam Kerala B in final. In August 2023, Kerala United gained I-League 3 spot, ahead of the beginning of its inaugural season. In that tournament, the club finished in fourth place in final round play-off, missed the opportunity of qualifying to I-League 2. They were reinstated to the 2024–25 I-League 3.

== Club crest and kits ==
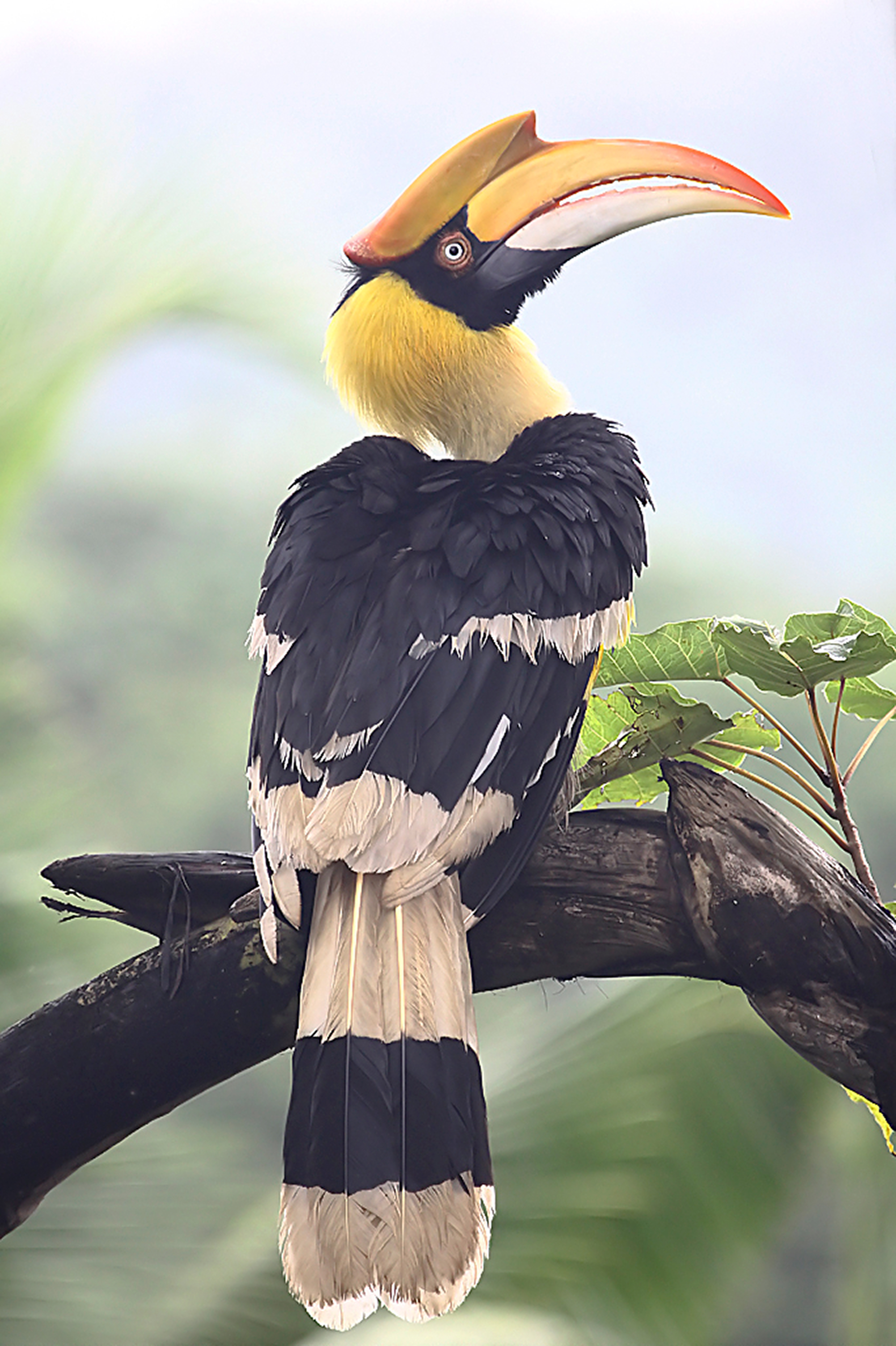
Great hornbill, the official state bird of Kerala, from which the crest of Kerala United has derived.

The United World Group had unveiled the crest after rebranding the club which features the Great Hornbill, the official state bird of Kerala. The club is also nicknamed after the bird as "The Hornbills".

The primary colour of team is purple which dominates their home kit, with the hornbill crest in the right side, white shorts and white socks.

=== Kit manufacturers and shirt sponsors ===
Period	Kit Manufacturer	Shirt Sponsor
2011–2013	Star Impact	–
2013–2014	–	Ramco
2017–2018	Nivia	ICL Fincorp
2018–2020	Nivia	Ramco
2020–2021	KESPO	Micro Health Laboratories
2021–2022	SEGA	Micro Health Laboratories
2022–present	Erreà	Micro Health Laboratories

=== Kit evolution ===
2020–21	2021–22

== Stadium ==
=== Former venues ===
Since 1977, Kerala United FC played its home matches at the EMS Stadium in Kozhikode.

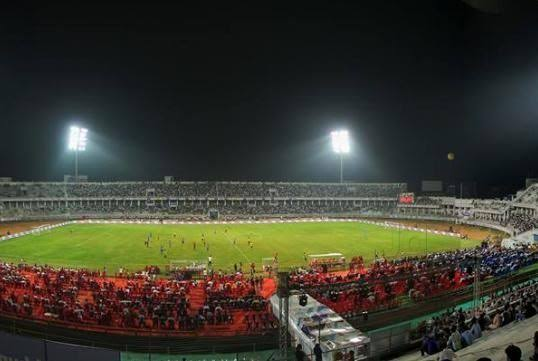
EMS Stadium on a matchday

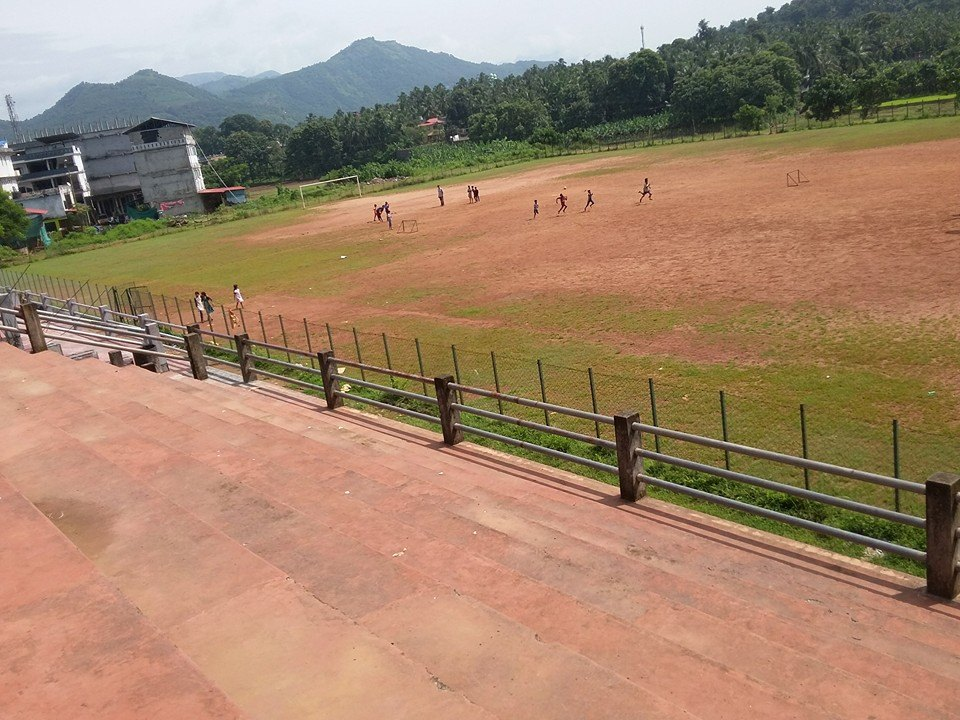
A view of Seethi Haji Football Ground

In 2021, Kerala United FC shifted their base from Kozhikode to Malappuram district Seethi Haji Stadium, located in Edavanna, as their training ground.

=== Current venue ===
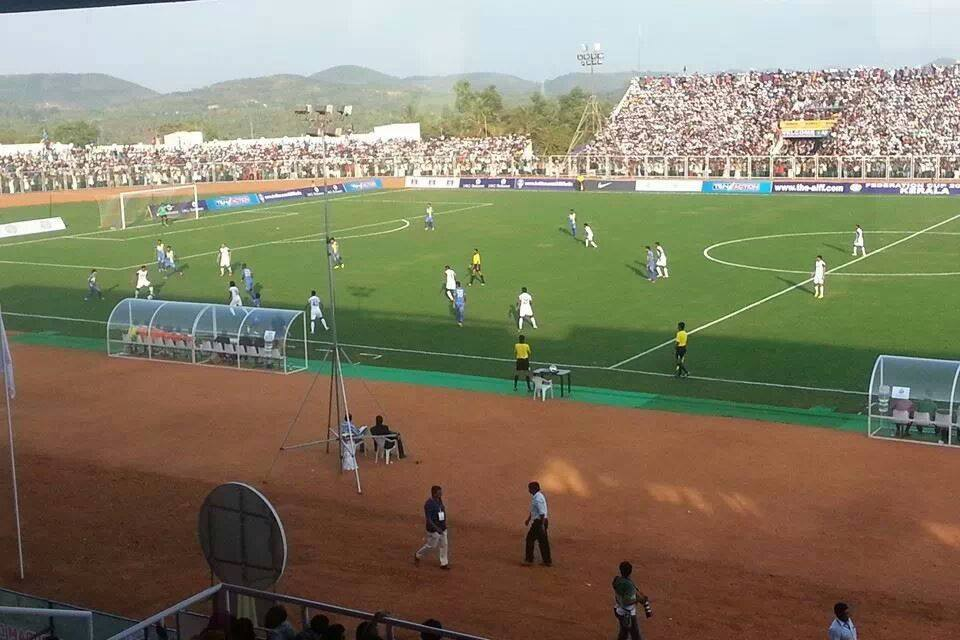
A view of Malappuram District Sports Complex Stadium, Manjeri

The club plays its home games at the Payyanad Stadium in nearby town called Manjeri.

== Rivalry ==
During their time at Kozhikode as Calicut Quartz FC, they had a rivalry with former National Football League side FC Kochin. They also enjoyed an on field rivalry with another Kozhikode based side Gokulam Kerala FC. The first Kozhikode Derby match between the two teams took place in the final of 2017–18 Kerala Premier League, where Calicut Quartz FC beat Gokulam Kerala FC beat 3–2. Upon change of ownership, team shifted its base from Kozhikode to Malappuram District which introduced a new Malabar Derby in Kerala Premier League. First match after acquisition was in 2020–21 Kerala Premier League semifinals, where two teams locked horns. The match ended as a goalless draw even after full time. Gokulam won 4–2 on penalties.

== Players ==
=== First-team squad ===
As of 30 January 2025

Note: Flags indicate national team as defined under FIFA eligibility rules; some limited exceptions apply. Players may hold more than one non-FIFA nationality.

No.	Pos.	Nation	Player
2	DF	IND	Mohammed Muzammil
3	DF	IND	Rishik Shetty
4	DF	IND	Lalmuanawma Munez
5	MF	IND	Craig Mangkhanlian
6	DF	IND	Rudrarajsinh Jadeja
7	FW	IND	Vanlalmalsawma
8	FW	IND	Muhammed Adhilshan
9	FW	IND	Shihad
10	MF	IND	Thufail K
11	FW	IND	Rizwan Shoukath
12	DF	IND	Vaisakh
14	MF	IND	Varun Prasad
17	FW	IND	Sangeeth Satheesh
18	MF	IND	Abin Krishna

No.	Pos.	Nation	Player
19	MF	IND	Adil Muneer
20	FW	IND	Febin Gibbs
20	FW	IND	Mohammed Zidan
23	GK	IND	Sreesanth
27	DF	IND	Lalsawmpuia
30	MF	IND	Sreejith Kallingal
33	MF	IND	Arjun Das
37	DF	IND	Joseph Sailo
44	DF	IND	Faseen Kuniyil
47	DF	IND	Abhiram
49	GK	IND	Vivek Venugopal
66	MF	IND	Mohammed Riyas
77	GK	IND	Mohammed Sinan

=== Notable players ===
Had international caps for their respective countries whilst playing for Kerala United FC:

India

- (India) Rino Anto (2012)

Bhutan

- (Bhutan) Biren Basnet (2018)
- (Bhutan) Lungtok Dawa (2018–2019)

== Personnel ==
=== Youth academy ===
Position	Name
Head of grassroots development	(India) Shajirudheen Koppilan
Head of youth development	(India) Suneer VP
Team manager	(India) Alfin K Joseph

== Corporate hierarchy ==
Position	Name
Chief executive officer	(India) Shabeer Mannaril
Managing director	(India) Zakariya Koduvery

== Statistics and records ==
=== Season statistics ===
As of 21 March 2023

Season	KPL	I-League 3	I-League 2nd Division
2011–12	–	–	Group stage
2012—13	–	–	DNQ
2013—14	Group stage	–	DNQ
2014—15	DNP	–	DNQ
2015—16	DNP	–	DNQ
2016—17	Pulled Out from the League	–	DNQ
2017—18	Runner-Up	–	DNP
2018–19	DNP	–	DNQ
2019–20	DNP	–	DNP
2020–21	Semi-final	–	DNQ
2021–22	Group stage	–	Group stage
2022–23	Champions	–	DNQ
2023–24	Champions	Play Offs	DNQ

=== Head coaching record ===
As of 11 August 2024

Name	Nationality	From	To	P	W	D	L	GF	GA	Win%	Ref.
Frank Braner	Germany	1 January 2012	28 May 2012	7	0	1	6	4	29	0.00	
Bino George	India	29 May 2012	29 December 2012	0	0	0	0	0	0	—	
Carlton Chapman	India	28 May 2017	12 October 2020	10	6	1	3	21	20	60.00	
Shajirudheen Koppilan	India	15 January 2021	4 July 2021	6	4	1	1	16	5	66.67	
Bino George	India	16 August 2021	1 July 2022	13	9	2	2	31	11	69.23	
Saheed Ramon	Nigeria	3 November 2022	28 May 2024	35	21	7	7	78	37	60.00	
Sena Fanai	India	21 July 2024		4	1	2	1	5	3	25.00	

== Affiliated clubs ==
The following clubs are currently affiliated with KUFC:

- (England) Sheffield United (2020–present)
- (United Arab Emirates) Al-Hilal United (2020–present)
- (Belgium) K Beerschot VA (2020–present)
- (France) LB Châteauroux (2021–present)

== Other department ==
=== Kerala United Women's ===
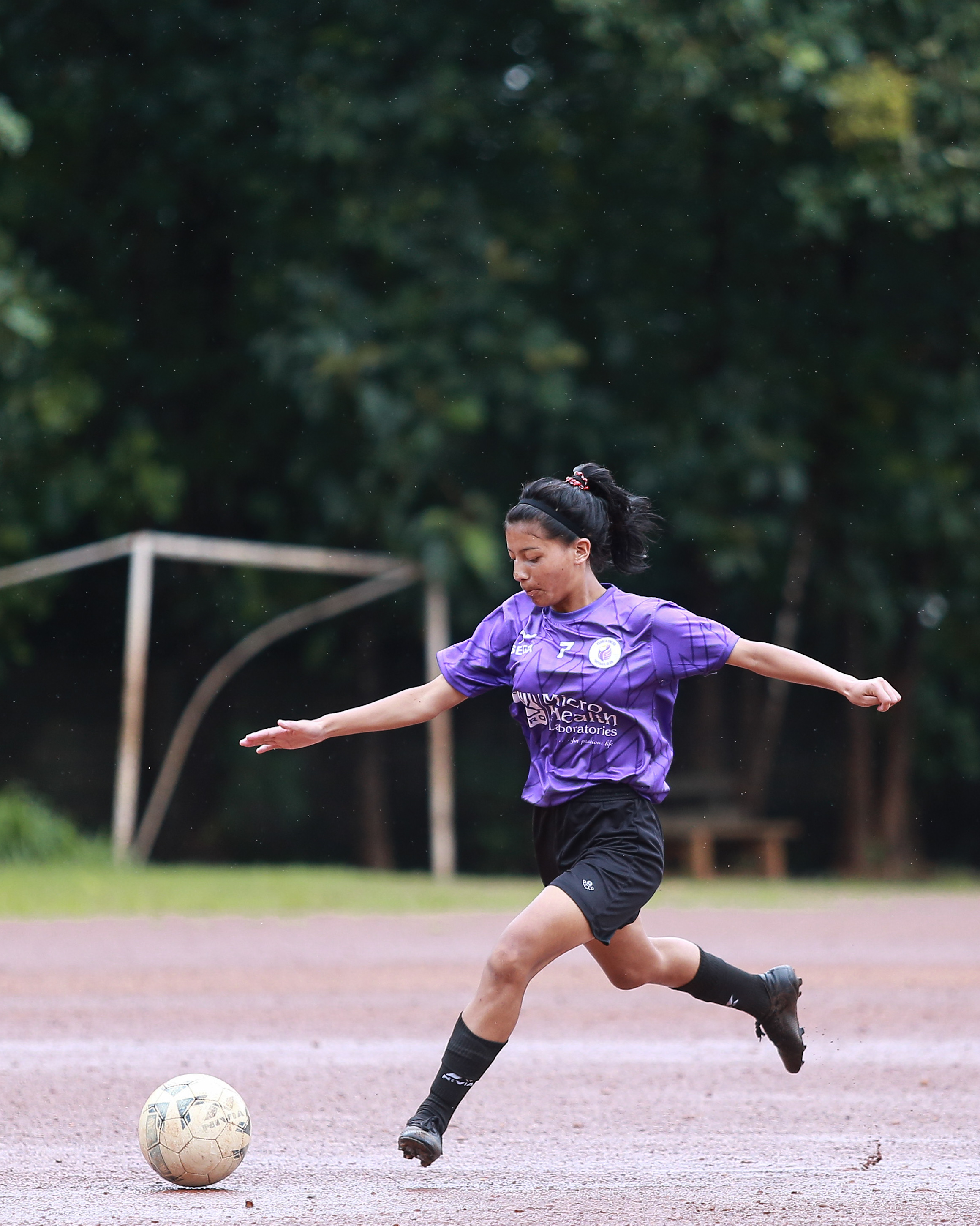
Kerala United (Women's) player in action during a state league match in 2022

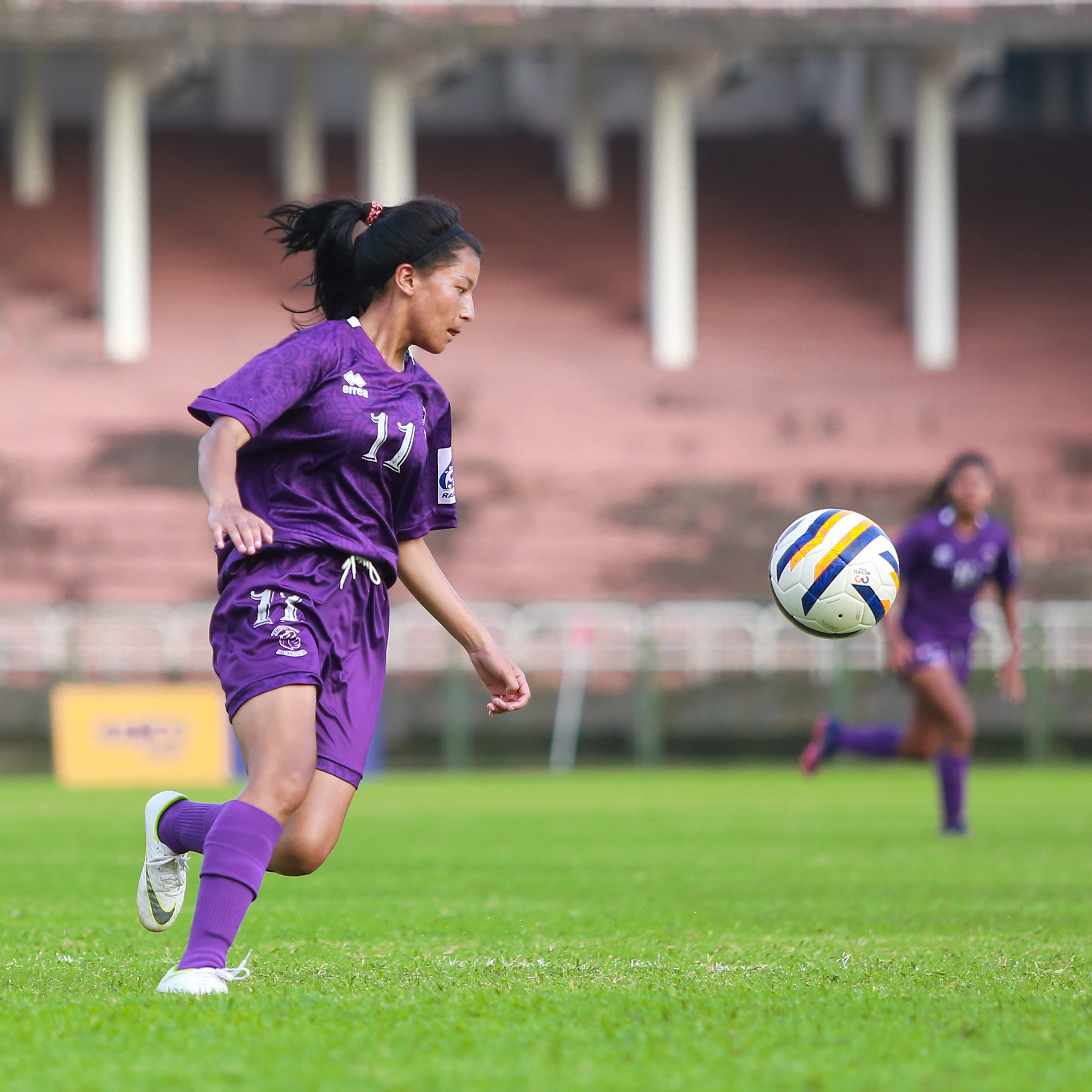
Kerala United (Women's) players in 2022

The women's football section of Kerala United is currently competing in Kerala Women's League. They also took part in preliminary round of the Indian Women's League in 2016.

== Honours ==
=== League ===
- Kerala Premier League
  - Champions (2): 2022–23, 2023–24
  - Runners-up (1): 2017–18 (as Quartz)
- Kozhikode District League (as Quartz)
  - Champions (2): 2011, 2012
  - Runners-up (1): 2017, 2018

=== Cup ===
- Independence Day Cup
  - Runners-up (1): 2021
- Bodousa Cup
  - Runners-up (1): 2021

== See also ==
- Football in Kerala
- List of football clubs in India
- Sports in Kerala
