= Jawahar Municipal Stadium =

Stadium in India

- Interactive map of Jawahar Municipal Stadium
- Location: Kannur, Kerala
- Coordinates: 11.87626°N 75.36835°E
- Owner: Kannur Municipal Corporation
- Capacity: 25000
- Surface: Grass

Construction
- Renovated: 2024

Tenants
- FC Kochin; Chirag United Club Kerala; Kannur Warriors FC (currently)

Jawahar Municipal Stadium is a stadium in Kannur, India. It is mainly used for football matches. It has a capacity of 30,000 spectators.

In 2012, Diego Maradona made appearance at stadium with some magical moves with the ball.
