= South Indian Bank =

Indian private sector banking company

The South Indian Bank Ltd.

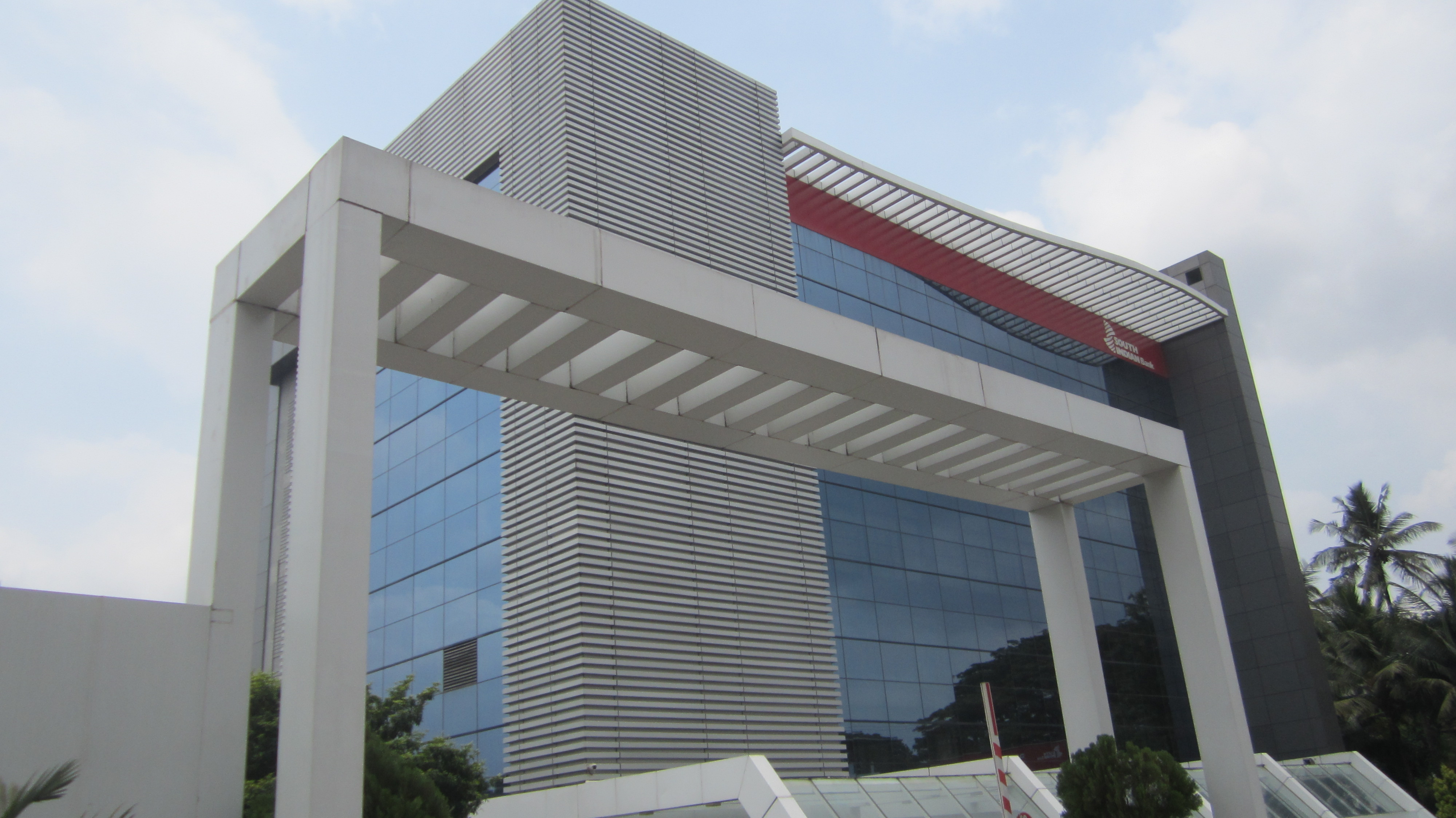
- South Indian Bank Head Office
- Type: Public
- Traded as: BSE: 532218; NSE: SOUTHBANK
- Industry: Banking; Financial services
- Founded: 1929; 97 years ago
- Headquarters: Thrissur, Kerala, India
- Key people: Jose Joseph Kattoor (Chairman); Mahesh Muralidhar Pai (MD & CEO)
- Products: Credit cards, Mutual Fund Trading, Demat account, Consumer banking, Corporate banking, Finance and Insurance, Mortgage loans, Private banking, Wealth management, Investment banking
- Revenue: ₹11,855.99 Crores (FY2025-26)
- Operating income: ▲₹1,956.04 crore (US$200 million) (2026)
- Net income: ▲₹1,455.14 crore (US$150 million) (2026)
- Total assets: ₹1,41,75,630 Lakhs (FY 2025-26)
- Total equity: ₹10664Crore (As of 25 May 2026)
- Number of employees: 9,369 (As of 31 March 2025)
- Subsidiaries: SIB Operations and Services Limited
- Capital ratio: 19.66%
- Rating: CRISIL A1+
- Website: www.southindianbank.bank.in

The South Indian Bank Limited (SIB) is an Indian private-sector bank headquartered at Thrissur in Kerala. It came into being during the Swadeshi movement. It began as a private limited company and was later converted into a public limited company in 1939. The bank provides retail and corporate banking services, para banking activities, third party distribution along with Treasury and Foreign Exchange Business.

As of 31 December 2024, the bank had a network of 955 banking outlets (954 branches and 1 service branch) and 1290 ATMs/CRMs (1159 ATMs and 131 CRMs) spanning 26 states and 4 union territories).

== History of SIB ==
Old logo

South Indian Bank was registered in 1929 under the Companies Act. It commenced business on 29 January 1929 at Round South, Thrissur.

The first branch to open outside Kerala was in Coimbatore, in 1941. It was included in the second schedule of the Reserve Bank of India and became a scheduled bank on 7 August 1946. SIB was the first scheduled bank in the private sector in Kerala to get the license under Section 22 of the Banking Regulation Act, 1949 from the RBI on 17 June 1957.

During 1963, the bank took over the assets and liabilities of Krishnavilasam Banking Company Ltd. and Ambat Bank Pvt Ltd., Chittur, Kerala. The year 1964 is a major period for the bank- the bank had acquired 10 banks including Public Bank Ltd, Suburban Bank Pvt. Ltd., Vijalakshmi Bank Pvt Ltd, Chalakudy Bank Ltd, Mukkattukara Catholic Bank Ltd, Assyrian Charities Banking Company Ltd, The Catholic Syrian Christian Bank Ltd, Malabar Bank Ltd, Bharata Union Bank Ltd and Kozhuvanal Bank Ltd.

In 1990, SIB made an entry into merchant banking activities by supporting 99 issues. A currency chest activity was executed in April 1992. Also in 1992, the bank opened their first NRI branch. In 1993, the bank started an Industrial Finance Branch in March, and opened an overseas branch to cater to import-export business in June.

Their Initial Public Offering was made and taken to the public in the year 1998. That year, SIB also entered into an alliance with three exchange houses in Gulf. In the year 2002, a tie-up was also made between the bank and an insurance payer for distributing the products of the latter. The follow on public offering was made in 2005.

== See also ==
- Banking in India
- List of banks in India
- Reserve Bank of India
- Indian Financial System Code
