= Kerala Blasters FC Reserves and Academy =

Reserve and youth teams of Kerala Blasters

Kerala Blasters FC B
- Full name: Kerala Blasters Football Club Reserves and Academy
- Nicknames: Manjappada (Yellow Army); Little Tuskers; Young Blasters
- Founded: Reserves: January 12, 2017; 9 years ago Academy: August 11, 2015; 11 years ago
- Ground: Maharaja's College Stadium, Ernakulam
- Capacity: 15,000
- Head coach: Amit Rana (Reserves)
- League: KPL; Reliance Foundation Development League
- Website: keralablastersfc.in
Home colours	Away colours	Third colours

Kerala Blasters Football Club Reserves and Academy, also known as Kerala Blasters B, are the reserve team and academy of the Kochi based Indian Super League club Kerala Blasters. The reserve team of the Blasters most recently competed in the Kerala Premier League, the top division of Kerala football and the RF Development League. The club's youth system also called as KBFC Young Blasters consists of three teams, Under-17, Under-15 and Under-13 age groups that competes in their respective age divisions of the Youth League. The youth teams of the Blasters has previously played in the Elite League, the top tier of the youth football system in India.

== History ==
On 20 February 2018, it was announced by the All India Football Federation, the organising body for Indian football, that the Kerala Blasters along with six other Indian Super League sides would field a reserve team in the I-League 2nd Division, India's then second division football league.

The first ever competitive match for the reserves was against Ozone FC on 16 March 2018 in which they suffered a defeat. But they managed to become the table toppers of Group B by winning seven games from ten matches. However, as per the rules, reserve teams of the clubs were not eligible for advancing into the final round. In the same year itself, the side also started to participate in the Kerala Premier League, which is the top division league for the clubs from Kerala. During their first season in KPL, they finished the group stage in third place, thus missing the play-offs.

In 2018-19, they finished in third place of the group. In KPL they became the semi-finalists during the 2018-19 season.

They won the 2019-2020 season of Kerala Premier League after defeating the reserve side of their rivals Gokulam Kerala FC in a penalty shootout. In the I-League 2nd Division, they finished the season in fifth place.

In January 2021, the club appointed T. G. Purushothaman as their new head coach, replacing Renjith TA and Shameel Chembakath.

In April 2022, they made their debut in the inaugural edition of the Reliance Foundation Development League (RFDL). Technical Advisor Tomasz Tchorz was appointed as the head coach while T.G Purushothaman became his assistant. The team won five out of the seven matches which included six clean sheets. With sixteen points in total, they finished second in the table behind Bengaluru FC reserves and qualified for the Next Gen Cup, which was held in the United Kingdom. In the Next Gen Cup's group B semi final, they lost 7–0 against Tottenham Hotspur F.C Academy. In the third-place play-off, they lost 1–4 to Crystal Palace F.C Academy.

In August 2022, with the first team preparing for the 2022–23 Indian Super League season, Kerala Blasters fielded their reserves for the 2022 Durand Cup. With two wins, a draw and two defeats, they qualified for the quarter-finals as the second team from Group D behind Odisha FC. In the quarter-finals, they were defeated 3–0 by Mohammedan SC.

== Reserves squad ==
As of 20 November 2026

Note: Flags indicate national team as defined under FIFA eligibility rules; some limited exceptions apply. Players may hold more than one non-FIFA nationality.

No.	Pos.	Nation	Player
1	GK	IND	Alsabith S T
13	GK	IND	Smarnik Thapa
21	GK	IND	Anant Shah
2	DF	IND	Samarth Bhardwaj
3	DF	IND	Sravan Yohan
4	DF	IND	Afin Mon Baiju
5	DF	IND	Nirbhay Singh
19	DF	IND	John Lalrinawma
20	DF	IND	Raj Gazi
25	DF	IND	Nigel Kunnan
6	MF	IND	Joel Lalramengmawia
12	MF	IND	Ngamgouhou Mate
15	MF	IND	Muhamad Anas U R
16	MF	IND	Yumkhaibam Indranath Singh
17	MF	IND	Roshith Joshi
18	MF	IND	Muhammed Rashid P (Captain)
23	MF	IND	Muhammed Zahan M.M

No.	Pos.	Nation	Player
7	FW	IND	Sujin S
8	FW	IND	Aviraj Singh Kapur
9	FW	IND	Mohammed Adhnan K
10	FW	IND	Heeranganba Seram
11	FW	IND	Abhinav Sojan
14	FW	IND	Vaishak A
22	FW	IND	Jeevan V
24	FW	IND	Kishor Tiwari

== Statistics and records ==
=== Season-by-season ===
Note: Reserve clubs are not promoted nor allowed to play in playoffs of I-League 2nd Division

Season	I-League 2nd Division								Top Scorer	
Season	P	W	D	L	GF	GA	Pts	Position	Player	Goals
2017–18	10	7	0	3	25	17	21	1st (Group B)	(India) Shaiborlang Kharpan	8
2018–19	8	2	2	4	8	13	8	3rd (Group B)	(India) Pragyan Gogoi	3
2019–20	7	1	2	4	8	14	5	5th (Group C)	(India) Ronaldo Oliveira	4

Season	Kerala Premier League									Top Scorer	
Season	P	W	D	L	GF	GA	Pts	Position	Playoffs	Player	Goals
2017–18	8	5	0	3	27	10	15	3rd (Group A)	DNQ	(India) Shaiborlang Kharpan	8
2018–19	7	4	1	2	10	9	12	2nd (Group A)	Semi-finalists	(India) Jithin M.S.	3
2019–20	8	3	2	3	13	10	11	2nd (Group A)	Champions	(India) Shaiborlang Kharpan	4
2020–21	5	2	1	2	8	9	7	4th (Group B)	DNQ	(India) Nihal Sudheesh (India) Sreekkuttan V S	2
2021–22	10	3	0	7	11	20	9	9th (Group B)	DNQ		

Season	Reliance Foundation Development League							Result	Top Scorer	
Season	P	W	D	L	GF	GA	Pts	Result	Player	Goals
2022	7	6	1	0	11	3	19	Runners-up	(India) Nihal Sudeesh (India) Vincy Barretto	4
2023	14	8	3	3	34	17	27	National Group Stage	(India) Muhammad Ajsal	11
2024	14	6	2	6	25	25	20	National Group Stage	(India) Sreekuttan M.S.	10
2025	15	6	4	5	27	21	22	Zonal Group Stage	(India) Sreekuttan M.S.	6
2025–26	23	12	3	7	41	35	39	4th	(India) Makakmayum Daniyal	13
2026–27	2	2	0	0	13	0	6		(India) Sujin S	4
As of 20 November 2026

== Kit manufacturers and Shirt sponsors ==
Period	Kit Manufacturer	Shirt Prime Sponsor
2017—2018	Admiral Sportswear	Muthoot Group
2018—2020	SIX5SIX	Muthoot Group
2020—21	Reyaur Sports	BYJU'S
2021—	SIX5SIX	BYJU'S

== Youth and academy ==
The Kerala Blasters youth system known as KBFC Young Blasters currently consists of 3 teams from 3 different age groups, the Under-17 (previously U-18), Under-15 and Under-13. The U-18 team had previously participated in the Elite league, which is the top division of youth football in India Similarly, the U-15 team had played in the Hero Juniors League and the junior most team, the U-13 team, had played in the Hero Sub-Juniors League respectively. Players from the under-17 team are promoted into the reserve team based on their performance.

=== History ===
==== Inception and early years: 2015–2019 ====
In association with the Kerala Football Association, the Kerala Blasters announced the opening of 25 football schools throughout Kerala. In addition to the schools, the club announced that they would also hold weekend grassroots leagues for the children of under-10 to under-16 and the start of a residential academy in the future. The first Kerala Blasters Football School was inaugurated on 11 August 2015 at Dr. Ambedkar Stadium Kochi after 15 months which the club was founded. Later, three more schools were opened in Thiruvananthapuram, Kozhikode and Thrissur as a part of the club's new youth academy system. Former Irish International Terry Phelan was appointed as the head of the grassroots. In 2017, Thangboi Singto was appointed as the technical director of the youth. In the same year itself, their U-18 and U-15 teams began to participate in the Elite League and Juniors League respectively. The U-18 team became the runners up of the 2017–18 Youth League in their first ever appearance while the U-15 side managed to reach the play-offs. In 2018, the U-13 side started to participate in the Sub-Juniors League.

==== KB Young Blasters: 2019–present ====
In 2019, Kerala Blasters rejuvenated their youth system. They launched the KB Young Blasters and appointed Mario Marinică as the technical director of the youth. As a part of this, a residential academy was also launched for the first time in club's history. The Blasters also announced that they will launch India's first ever goalkeeping academy in Kochi headed by John Burridge. As a part of KB Young Blasters, the club also started the Young Ambassador Program in September 2020. It focus on the promising youngsters from the club's Young Blasters centers across Kerala to make them oriented, trained and equipped with adequate skill and technique, to be the face and voice of the club in the future.

On 16 October 2020, the Blasters announced a five-year partnership agreement with "Sporthood", which is a network of sports centres. The Young Blasters program is now termed as "Young Blasters – Sporthood Academy", that imparts a Kerala Blasters verified performance training curriculum to kids, reviewed and audited by the club's experts from time to time. On 16 January 2021, the club announced the association of "FC Imphal City", the first academy from Manipur to play in the Hero Indian Elite League with the Young Blasters – Sporthood Academy. This was the first time that the Blasters expanded their grassroot system outside of Kerala. In February 2021, the club's senior team assistant manager Tomasz Tchórz took over as the Technical advisor/director role at the Blasters.

On 5 July 2022, the club announced that their academy programme has crossed 3,000 admissions, which was the highest number of admissions ever achieved by a football academy in Kerala.

== The sports Kerala-Kerala Blasters academy ==
On 16 September 2021, Kerala Blasters launched the Sports Kerala-Kerala Blasters academy in association with the Government of Kerala. As part of a five-year deal, the Blasters is managing a residential football academy for the U-14, U-17 and U-20 categories for boys at the GV Raja Sports School, Thiruvananthapuram.

== Youth squads ==
=== Kerala Blasters U-17 ===
Kerala Blasters Under-17 team currently participates in the Ernakulam District Youth League under-17 division. They had played the Elite League in the past. They are also the second reserve team of the club and is coached by Noor Alam. The team's best performance came in 2018 as they finished finalists in the 2017–18 season of the elite league.

==== Current squad ====
As of 14 September 2022

Note: Flags indicate national team as defined under FIFA eligibility rules; some limited exceptions apply. Players may hold more than one non-FIFA nationality.

No.	Pos.	Nation	Player
—	GK	IND	Aju A
—	GK	IND	Merin C
—	GK	IND	Dyankrishna Shaji
—	GK	IND	Muhammed Fizan
—	DF	IND	Sreerag P.S
—	DF	IND	Dharshan K.R
—	DF	IND	Abhinav Umesh
—	DF	IND	Abhinav Anil
—	DF	IND	Sivaji S
—	DF	IND	Albin Jinson
—	DF	IND	Clinto Ronaldo
—	DF	IND	Adwaith M.A
—	DF	IND	Amar Mohammed
—	DF	IND	Muhammed Rashid

No.	Pos.	Nation	Player
—	MF	IND	Shivjith
—	MF	IND	Rehan Rajive
—	MF	IND	V.S Piyush
—	MF	IND	Nesinorrdin
—	MF	IND	Amal C.S
—	MF	IND	Salih Aman
—	MF	IND	Abdul Raziq
—	MF	IND	Jasion Jose
—	MF	IND	Korou Singh thingujam
—	FW	IND	Parwej Mushraf
—	FW	IND	Afsal
—	FW	IND	Muhammed Haris
—	FW	IND	Muhammed Abrar
—	FW	IND	Muhammed Shamil
—	FW	IND	Muhammed Shiyas
—	FW	IND	Vaishak A

Elite Youth League U18 statistics of Kerala Blasters U18

Season	Position	Top Scorer	Goals	Notes
2017–18	Runners-up	Adharsh AS	8	First Appearance
2018–19	Playoffs	Surag Chhetri	9	

=== Kerala Blasters U-15 ===
Kerala Blasters Under-15 side currently participates in the Ernakulam District Youth League. They had played the Hero Juniors League (Elite U15) and the Kerala U15 Academy League in the past. The team had a good run in the 2018–19 season of the Hero Juniors League as they made it to the semi-finals of the competition. The team is currently head coached by Rohan Shah, who also serves as the assistant manager of the under-18 team of the Blasters.

==== Current squad ====
As of 14 September 2022

Note: Flags indicate national team as defined under FIFA eligibility rules; some limited exceptions apply. Players may hold more than one non-FIFA nationality.

No.	Pos.	Nation	Player
—	GK	IND	Abhinand P.B
—	GK	IND	Mirzan Muhammed
—	GK	IND	Raphael Jose
—	GK	IND	Ajay P.J
—	DF	IND	Hafis K.H
—	DF	IND	Raphael Rosh
—	DF	IND	Joyal E.J
—	DF	IND	Edwin Anil
—	DF	IND	Sidharth A.S
—	DF	IND	Anderson
—	DF	IND	Adhil Johny
—	MF	IND	Mohammed Anas
—	MF	IND	Christo Vallappally

No.	Pos.	Nation	Player
—	MF	IND	Amal Sasidharan
—	MF	IND	Raja B
—	MF	IND	Muhammed Mishal
—	MF	IND	Arjun S
—	FW	IND	Jeevan V
—	FW	IND	Alphonse Chiriyankandath
—	FW	IND	Mohammed Haseeb
—	FW	IND	Muhammed Niyas
—	FW	IND	Ribin Paul
—	FW	IND	Sravan V.J
—	FW	IND	Muhammed Yaseen
—	FW	IND	Akshay Pathmanabhan

Hero Juniors League statistics of Kerala Blasters U15

Season	Position	Top Scorer	Goals	Notes
2017–18	Playoffs	Joshua NJ, Anandu N	3	First Appearance
2018–19	Semi-finals	Christopher Rajkumar	10	

=== Kerala Blasters U-13 ===
The Under-13 side of the Blasters currently plays in the Ernakulam District Youth League under-13 division. The team had played the Hero Sub-juniors League (Elite U13) in the past.

==== Current squad ====
As of 14 September 2022

Note: Flags indicate national team as defined under FIFA eligibility rules; some limited exceptions apply. Players may hold more than one non-FIFA nationality.

No.	Pos.	Nation	Player
—	GK	IND	Riswan T.R
—	GK	IND	Antonio Navin Thattil
—	DF	IND	Abhinav Shiva
—	DF	IND	Muhammed Afeek
—	DF	IND	Arijith P
—	DF	IND	Muhammed Sajid
—	DF	IND	Ishaq Abdul
—	DF	IND	Paul Abhi
—	DF	IND	Ryan Thomas
—	DF	IND	Harishankar N.U
—	MF	IND	Muhammed Ameen
—	MF	IND	Jayden Antony

No.	Pos.	Nation	Player
—	MF	IND	Neehar P
—	MF	IND	Nivedh Aryan
—	MF	IND	Saiman Ul Farisi
—	MF	IND	Shan Reginold
—	MF	IND	Shawn Stalin
—	MF	IND	Sreedeve Dineshan
—	MF	IND	Plinto Paul
—	FW	IND	Athul Raj
—	FW	IND	Bharath Bhushan
—	FW	IND	Payaspathi Premji
—	FW	IND	Sachin K.S

Hero Sub-Juniors League statistics of Kerala Blasters U13

Season	Position	Top Scorer	Goals	Notes
2018–19	Round 3	Lian Thangkhum	4	First Appearance

== Current technical staff ==
As of 6 August 2023

Role	Name	Refs.
Academy Director & Grassroots Head	(India) Rajah Rizwan	
Reserves Head Coach	(India) Amit Rana	
U-18 Head Coach	(India) Noor Alam	
U-18 Assistant Coach & U-15 Head Coach	(India) Rohan Shah	
U-15 Assistant Coach & U-13 Head Coach	Vacant	
Reserves Fitness Coach	(Portugal) Tiago Matos	
Reserves Goalkeeping Coach	(Poland) Rafał Kwiecień	
Reserves Physiotherapist	(India) Anadhu S Kumar	
U-15 & U-13 Goalkeeping Coach	(India) Munavar. E	
U-15 & U-13 Physiotherapist	(India) Sayid Anvar	

== Technical directors of youth ==
Time span	Name
2015–2016	(Republic of Ireland) Terry Phelan
2017–2019	(India) Thangboi Singto
2019–2021	(Romania) Mario Marinică
2021–2025	(Poland) Tomasz Tchórz

== Honours ==
=== Reserves ===
- Kerala Premier League
  - Champions (1): 2019–20
- RF Development League
  - Runners-up (1): 2022
- Bandodkar Trophy
  - Runners-up (1): 2024

=== Youth ===
U18

- AIFF Youth League
  - Runners-up (1): 2017–18
- Kerala Youth League U18
  - Winners (1):2023

U15

- KYPD Chakolas Gold Trophy
  - Winners (1): 2024
