= FC Kerala =

Indian association football club

- Full name: FC Kerala
- Nickname: The Red Warriors
- Short name: FCK
- Founded: June 6, 2014; 12 years ago
- Ground: Thrissur Municipal Corporation Stadium
- Capacity: 15,000
- Owner: FC Kerala Sports Ltd.
- League: Kerala Premier League
Home colours	Away colours

FC Kerala is an Indian professional football club based in Thrissur, Kerala. The club made its debut in national level football through the I-League 2nd Division in 2017–18. They also compete in the Kerala Premier League and Thrissur District Super League.

== Name ==
FC Kerala is a crowd-funded venture that started in 2014 with aim of reaching out to football fans in the state better than predecessors who hit financial crisis. The name FC Kerala was set up to make it Kerala's own club. Narayana Menon, CEO of the club said that its main aim is to become Football team of the people.

== History ==
FC Kerala, formed in 2014, began its journey by playing in Kerala Premier League, a professional league organised by Kerala Football Association. After three years, the club made its debut in I-League 2nd Division. FC Kerala claimed victory in the first match after overcoming Fateh Hyderabad 2–1.

In the 2019–20 2nd Division League, FC Kerala played 7 matches in group C and earned 9 points, but later pulled out to financial crisis. In December 2022, the club participated in Dausa Gold Cup in Rajasthan, in which they won title with 1–0 win over I-League side Rajasthan United in final.

== Kit manufacturers and shirt sponsors ==
Period	Kit manufacturer	Shirt sponsor
2017—2019		Yogakshemam Loans
2020—present		Yoga Loans

== Stadium ==
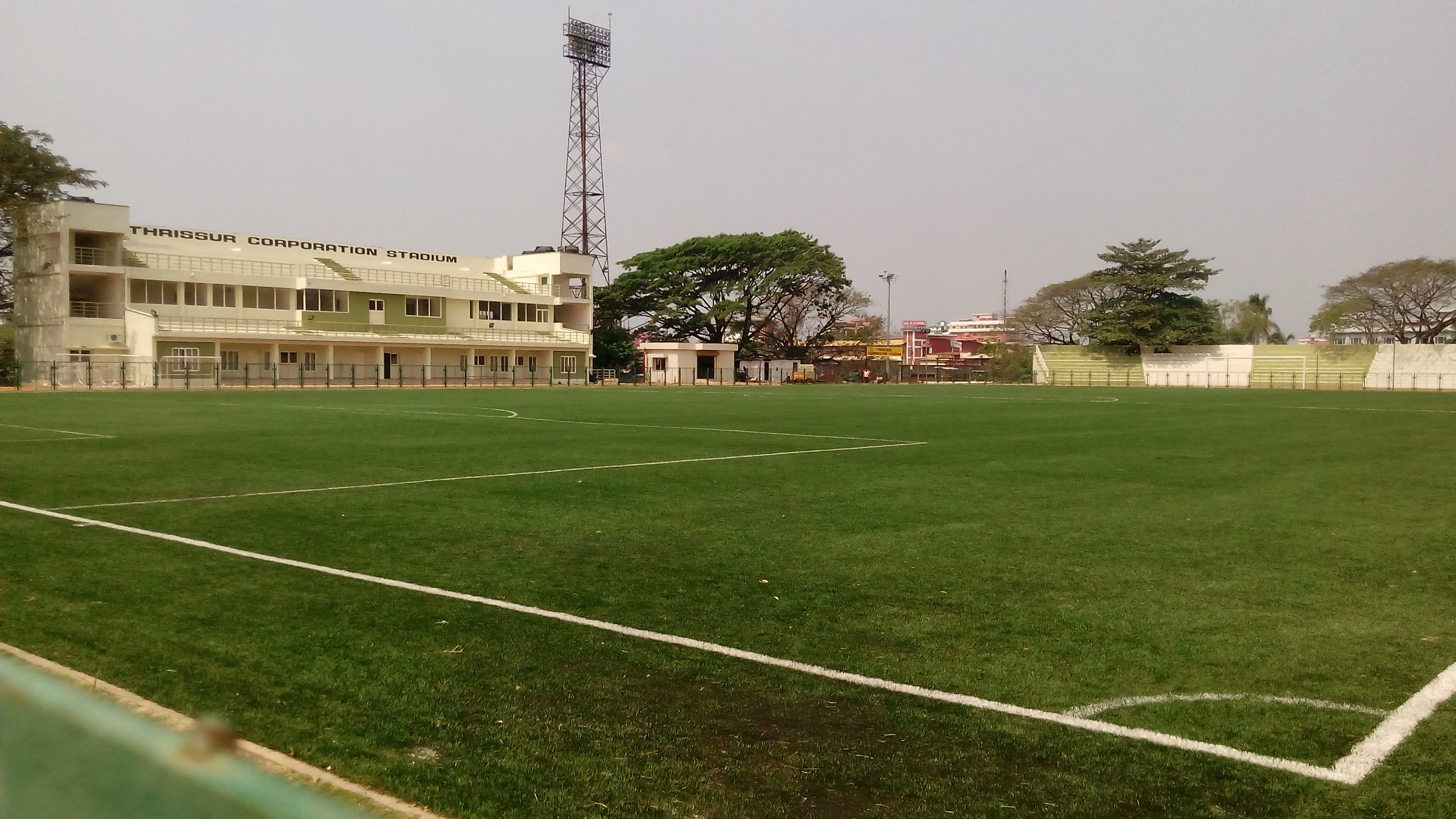
Thrissur Municipal Corporation Stadium

FC Kerala uses the Thrissur Municipal Corporation Stadium as their home ground. It has artificial turf and seating capacity of 15,000 spectators. Opened in 1978, it is commonly known as Palace Stadium or TMC Stadium.

== Supporters ==
A Thrissur-based fan club by the name Red Warriors has been in support since 2017.

== Current squad ==
Note: Flags indicate national team as defined under FIFA eligibility rules; some limited exceptions apply. Players may hold more than one non-FIFA nationality.

No.	Pos.	Nation	Player
1	GK	IND	Muhammed Shibili
2	DF	IND	Safwan A.
3	DF	IND	Melwin Thomas
5	DF	IND	Muhamed Shabin
8	DF	IND	Ranoof KA
9	MF	IND	Muhammed Hashif
11	MF	IND	Abhishek S.
12	MF	IND	Muhammed Thafrique
13	DF	IND	Vishnu K Raj
14	MF	IND	Jibin PE
15	MF	IND	Asif Cherukunnan
16	GK	IND	Jithu T. R.
17	DF	IND	Amal KA
18	DF	IND	Sreejith D.
19	FW	GHA	Charles Offei

No.	Pos.	Nation	Player
20	DF	IND	Arun Vinod
21	MF	IND	Muhammed Ashiq
22	DF	IND	Vishnu PU
23	DF	IND	Saran Babu
24	FW	IND	Jeril Joy
25	DF	IND	Akhil Johnson
32	DF	IND	Rafid C.
26	DF	IND	Akhil Philip
28	DF	IND	Yadhu Krishnan
29	DF	IND	Sheheen
41	DF	IND	Pius Saju
43	DF	IND	Alet Johny
51	DF	IND	Sujith VR
55	DF	IND	Vineesh Kumar

== Current technical staff ==
Position	Name
Head coach	(India) Assis Kunjivappu
Technical director	(India) V. A. Narayana Menon

== Youth programmes ==
In 2020, FC Kerala announced that they are opening a residential Football Academy in Thrissur. Currently, the club runs a Soccer School in Thrissur, where close to 800 children, aged between 5 and 20, train under the guidance of India's finest football coaches.

With the launch of Residential Academy, FC Kerala gives the chances to youth players to be associated with the professional way of the FC Kerala family. FC Kerala also aims at personality development of the players thus moulding them as future citizens.

The club's U-13, U-15 and U-18 teams have participated in the respective AIFF Youth I-League tournaments, while the U-9, U-10, & U-11 play in the regional AIFF Baby League tournaments.

The youth teams (various age divisions) of FC Kerala play at the Thrissur Corporation Stadium, St. Alosius School Ground and Sri Kerala Varma College Ground.

== See also ==
- List of football clubs in Kerala
- All India Sevens Football

== Honours ==
=== League ===
- Kerala Premier League

Semi-final (1): 2018–19

=== Cup ===
- Dausa Gold Cup
  - Winners (1): 2022
