= Kottappadi Football Stadium, Malappuram =

Football stadium in Malappuram, India

Kottappadi Football Stadium
- Location: Down Hill, Malappuram
- Operator: Malappuram District Sports Council
- Capacity: 8,000
- Surface: Grass

Construction
- Cost: $ 3 million
- Architect: KITCO India

Tenant
- Kerala Premier League

Kottappadi Football Stadium, also known as Malappuram Stadium, is a historic football stadium in Malappuram, Kerala. It is under the management of Malappuram District Sports Council, located right at the heart of CBD of Malappuram. Malappuram is unequivocally considered to be the cradle of Indian football, and this stadium owns much of credit.

== History ==
The historic Kottapadi Maidan or Kavathu Parambu as it was called back then, saw the elders playing barefoot with the British Army, eventually going on to become a symbol of Malappuram’s football-centric culture. Late Irumban Moideen who started playing at Kottappadi joined Royal Indian Air Force and represented India.

== Events ==
Post Independence, the first official tournament reported to have been hosted by the stadium was the Moidu Memorial All-Kerala Football Tournament held in 1952. All-India Civil Service Tournament, Kerala Premier League, Kerala State Club Football Championship, were notable competitions organised at the stadium.

== Coaching & practice ==
Currently Kerala Blasters FC coaching center is stationed here, along with city level coaching provided by municipality. The stadium is home ground for Malappuram FC and was the practice turf for Gokulam FC. In the 2019–20 Kerala Premier League, the stadium served as home ground for Real Malabar FC & Luca Soccer Club.
