= Kovalam Football Club =

Indian association football club based in Kerala

Kovalam
- Full name: Kovalam Football Club
- Founded: 2008; 18 years ago
- Ground: M. V. Higher Secondary School Ground
- Owner(s): Thayil Mathew; Ebin Rose
- Head coach: Rajesh Mohanan
- League: Kerala Premier League
| Home colours | Away colours |

Kovalam Football Club (often abbreviated as Kovalam FC) is an Indian professional football club based on Kovalam, Thiruvananthapuram, Kerala. They compete in the Kerala Premier League, the fifth tier of the Indian football league system.

== History ==
Kovalam Football Club was founded in 2008 by Ebin Rose, a former Santhosh Trophy player for Kerala, and PJ Mathew, an ex-army personnel and footballer. It holds the unique distinction of being the first club from Kerala to play in the under-16 Youth League. Their senior side first participated in the 2018–19 KPL. It is also the first club from the state to have its own football specific stadium and residential academy, located behind the M. V. Higher Secondary School, Arumanoor. In 2014 they were the first Kerala club to receive youth academy accreditation from the AIFF.

== Jersey sponsors ==
| Period | Sponsor |
|---|---|
| 2020–present | Federal Bank |
