= Kozhikode Corporation EMS Stadium =

Multi-purpose stadium in Kozhikode, Kerala

Coordinates: 11°15′23″N 75°47′09″E

EMS Stadium
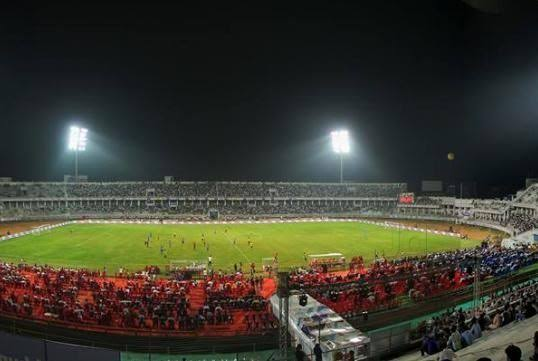
- Interactive map of EMS Stadium
- Address: India
- Location: Rajaji Road, Kozhikode, Kerala
- Owner: Kozhikode Corporation
- Operator: Kerala Football Association
- Capacity: 50,000
- Surface: Grass
- Record attendance: 100,000

Construction
- Opened: 1977; 49 years ago
- Architect: RK Remesh

Tenants
- India national football team (1987–present); Kerala football team (1960–present); Gokulam Kerala FC (2017–present); Gokulam Kerala FC (women) (2018–present); Calicut FC (2024–present)

The EMS Stadium, located in Kozhikode, Kerala, India, is a multi-purpose stadium primarily used for football matches. The stadium is home to the I-League club Gokulam Kerala. With a capacity of 50,000, it is the third largest football stadium in India.

Built in 1977, It is named after the first Chief Minister of Kerala E. M. S. Namboodiripad. Gokulam Kerala has been playing their home matches at the Stadium since 2017 and has had a successful run at the stadium winning their first I-League home match against East Bengal with a score of 2–1.

The stadium has played host to several important football tournaments, such as Super Cup, Santosh Trophy, and Sait Nagjee Football Tournament. The stadium is considered a historic and important venue for football in the region.

== Renovations ==
The Corporation Stadium has undergone significant renovations over the years to improve its infrastructure and facilities. In 2005, the stadium underwent a renovation to host State Bank of Travancore National Football League matches. Another renovation was done in 2011 in preparation for the National Games in 2012, with the Corporation of Kozhikode and the government investing around 18 Crore for the upgrade.

The new design of the stadium by RK Ramesh, includes state-of-the-art amenities such as a VVIP lounge with a seating capacity of 200, dressing rooms, media center, and other facilities. The grandstand pavilion was also upgraded for the National Games in 2012, and the stadium was fitted with improved floodlights to ensure high-quality matches. The EMS Stadium has been renovated to be an international standard stadium for both football and cricket.

The stadium is also equipped with modern facilities like VIP seating arrangements, food courts, and washrooms. The stadium has also installed CCTV cameras for security and safety measures. The stadium is easily accessible to public transport.

The EMS Stadium is a premier sports venue in Kerala and continues to host a wide range of events, such as concerts and festivals.

== Football ==
It was the home ground of Viva Kerala in the I-league. It was also the home ground of Gokulam Kerala, and its women's team. Currently the home of Calicut FC.

This stadium is famous for the football crazy fans of Kozhikode. Santosh Trophy and Sait Nagjee Football Tournament were held at the stadium.

The stadium hosted matches of 2023 Indian Super Cup.

=== Major football matches hosted ===
==== AFC Women's Championship ====
1980 AFC Women's Championship, where the Indian team won silver, was held here.

==== 1987 Nehru Cup ====
The Kozhikode Corporation EMS stadium hosted the 1987 Nehru Cup, which was won by the Soviet Union. National teams of Bulgaria, China, Denmark, Germany, India, Nigeria, Soviet Union and Syria participated in the tournament.

==== Sait Nagjee Football Tournament ====
2016 Sait Nagjee Trophy Teams

Team	Location	Confederation
FC Dnipro Reserves	Ukraine	UEFA
1860 München II	Munich	UEFA
Argentina U-23	Argentina	CONMEBOL
Atlético Paranaense Reserves	Curitiba	CONMEBOL
Volyn Lutsk	Ukraine	UEFA
Rapid București	Bucharest	UEFA
Shamrock Rovers	Dublin	UEFA
Watford Reserves	Watford	UEFA

=== National Games ===
The stadium hosted football matches for the 35th National Games.

== Other uses ==
=== Cricket ===
It also hosted the veterans of India and Pakistan cricket match in which legends like Ijaz Ahmed, Syed Kirmani and others played. In 1994, touring West Indies had taken Mumbai in a three-day encounter. West Indies were dismissed for 176 and Bombay ended the day at 53/2. The match, however, had to be called off after the opening day owing to law and order problems in the wake of a bandh.

=== Other Event ===
It also hosted many cultural events held at Kozhikode like malabar mahotsavam. It also hosted the inaugural performance of world tour of A. R. Rahman, the Academy Award–winning musician.

== Accessibility ==
The Kozhikode EMS Stadium is located in the heart of the city. It lies beside the Pavamani Road between Rajaji road and New Bus stand, a common stretch among many city bus routes. The Stadium Mavoor Road from the Western side allows access from Mananchira and Arayadathupalam, although there is no public transport along this route. The stadium is situated at 2.5 km from the Kozhikode railway station and railway stations respectively. The stadium is 26 km (16 mi) from Calicut International Airport, and 30 km (19 mi) from Thamarassery.

== See also ==
- Lists of stadiums
- List of association football stadiums by capacity
- Football in India
- Jawaharlal Nehru Stadium (Kochi)
- Gokulam Kerala
- Viva Kerala
