= List of Yuva Puraskar winners for English =

List of winners of a literary honor in India

Part of a series on

Sahitya Akademi Awards
Category
Sahitya Akademi Award winners by language
- Assamese
- Bengali
- Bodo
- Dogri
- English
- Gujarati
- Hindi
- Kannada
- Kashmiri
- Konkani
- Maithili
- Malayalam
- Marathi
- Meitei (Manipuri)
- Nepali
- Odia
- Punjabi
- Rajasthani
- Sanskrit
- Santali
- Sindhi
- Tamil
- Telugu
- Urdu
Sahitya Akademi Translation Prizes
- Assamese
- Bengali
- Bodo
- Dogri
- English
- Gujarati
- Hindi
- Kannada
- Kashmiri
- Konkani
- Maithili
- Malayalam
- Marathi
- Meitei (Manipuri)
- Nepali
- Odia
- Punjabi
- Rajasthani
- Sanskrit
- Santali
- Sindhi
- Tamil
- Telugu
- Urdu
Sahitya Akademi Yuva Puraskar
- Assamese
- Bengali
- Bodo
- Dogri
- English
- Gujarati
- Hindi
- Kannada
- Kashmiri
- Konkani
- Maithili
- Malayalam
- Meitei (Manipuri)
- Marathi
- Nepali
- Odia
- Punjabi
- Rajasthani
- Sanskrit
- Santali
- Sindhi
- Tamil
- Telugu
- Urdu
Sahitya Akademi Bal Sahitya Puraskar
- Assamese
- Bengali
- Bodo
- Dogri
- English
- Gujarati
- Hindi
- Kannada
- Kashmiri
- Konkani
- Maithili
- Malayalam
- Meitei (Manipuri)
- Marathi
- Nepali
- Odia
- Punjabi
- Rajasthani
- Sanskrit
- Santali
- Sindhi
- Tamil
- Telugu
- Urdu
Related
- Eighth Schedule to the Constitution of India
- Official Languages Commission
- List of languages by number of native speakers in India

Yuva Puraskar is given each year to young writers for their outstanding works in the 24 languages, since 2011.

== Recipients ==
Following is the list of recipients of Yuva Puraskar for their works written in English. The award comprises a cash prize of Rs. 50,000 and an engraved copper plaque.

| Year | Author | Work | Genre | References |
|---|---|---|---|---|
| 2011 | Vikram Sampath | 'My Name Is Gauhar Jaan!'–The Life And Times of A Musician | Biography | |
| 2012 | Aman Sethi | A Free Man | Non Fiction | |
| 2013 | Janice Pariat | Boats on Land | Short Stories | |
| 2014 | Kaushik Barua | Windhorse | Novel | |
| 2015 | Hansda Sowvendra Shekhar | The Mysterious Ailment of Rupi Baskey | Novel | |
| 2016 | Raghu Karnad | Farthest Field An Indian Story of The Second World War | Biography | |
| 2017 | Manu S. Pillai | The Ivory Throne | Biography | |
| 2018 | No Award | | | |
| 2019 | Tanuj Solanki | Diwali in Muzaffarnagar | Short Stories | |
| 2020 | Yashica Dutt | Coming Out as Dalit | Memoir | |
| 2021 | Megha Majumdar | A Burning | Novel | |
| 2022 | Mihir Vatsa | Tales of Hazaribagh | Travel Memoir | |
| 2023 | Anirudh Kanisetti | Lords of the Deccan: Southern India from the Chalukyas to the Cholas | Historical | |
| 2024 | K. Vaishali | Homeless: Growing up Lesbian and Dyslexic In India | Memoir | |
| 2025 | Advait Kottary | Siddhartha: The Boy Who Became the Buddha | Novel | |

== See also ==
- List of Sahitya Akademi Award winners for English
- List of Sahitya Akademi Translation Prize winners for English
