= Vellayani (disambiguation) =

Vellayani is an Indian village. It may also refer to:

- Vellayani Lake
- Vellayani Devi Temple
- College of Agriculture, Vellayani
- Vellayani Lake
- Vellayani Paramu
- Vellayani Arjunan
