= College of Agriculture, Vellayani =

Agriculture college in Kerala, India

- കാർഷിക കോളേജ്, വെള്ളായണി
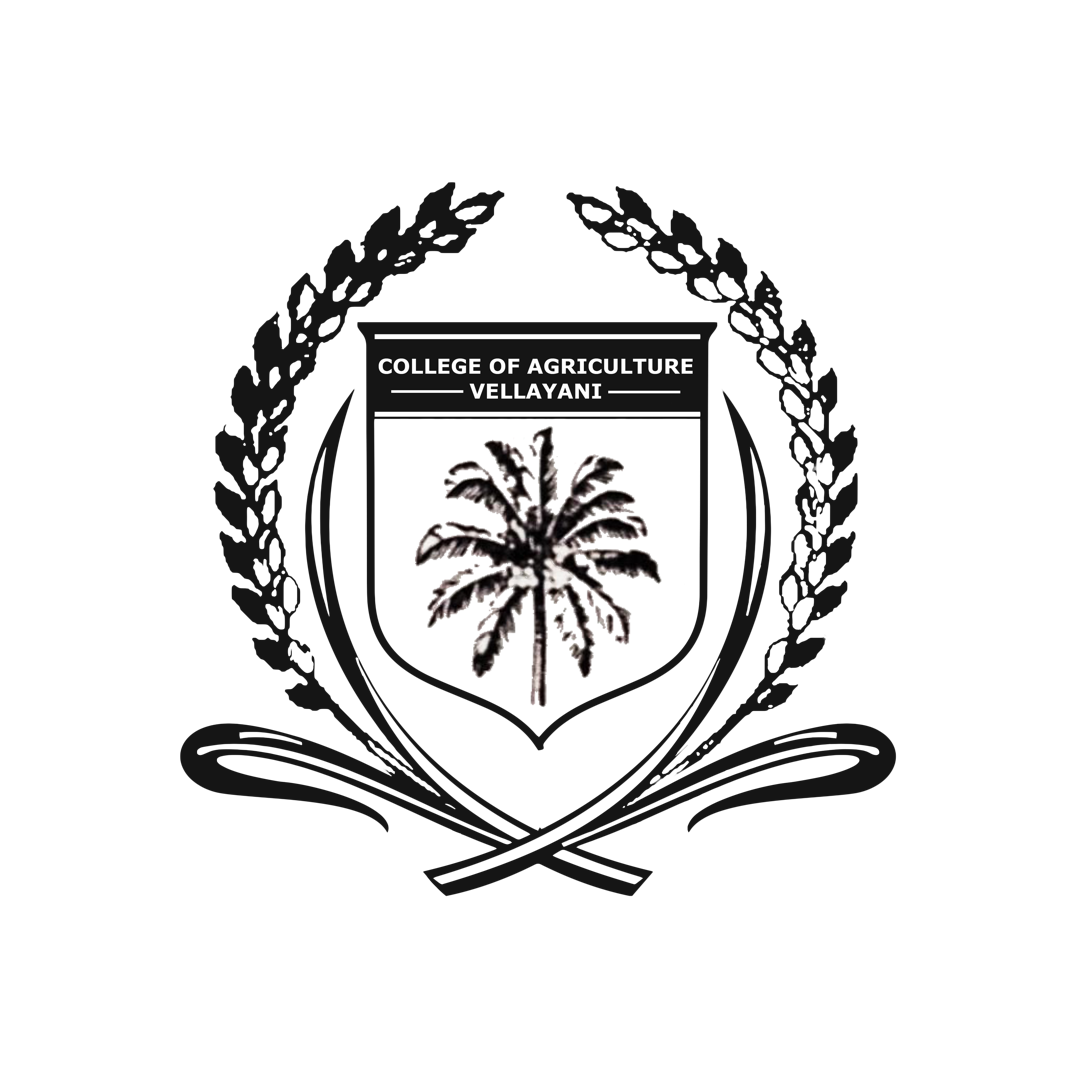
- Type: Government College
- Established: 1955; 71 years ago
- Accreditation: Indian Council of Agricultural Research
- Affiliations: Kerala Agricultural University
- Dean: Dr. Jacob John
- Location: Vellayani, Thiruvananthapuram, Kerala, 695 522, India; 8°25′45″N 76°59′16″E
- Campus: 250 hectares (620 acres)
- Campus Demonym: AGRICOS
- Abbreviation: CoAV, AGC
- College of Agriculture, Vellayani
- Website: coavellayani.kau.in

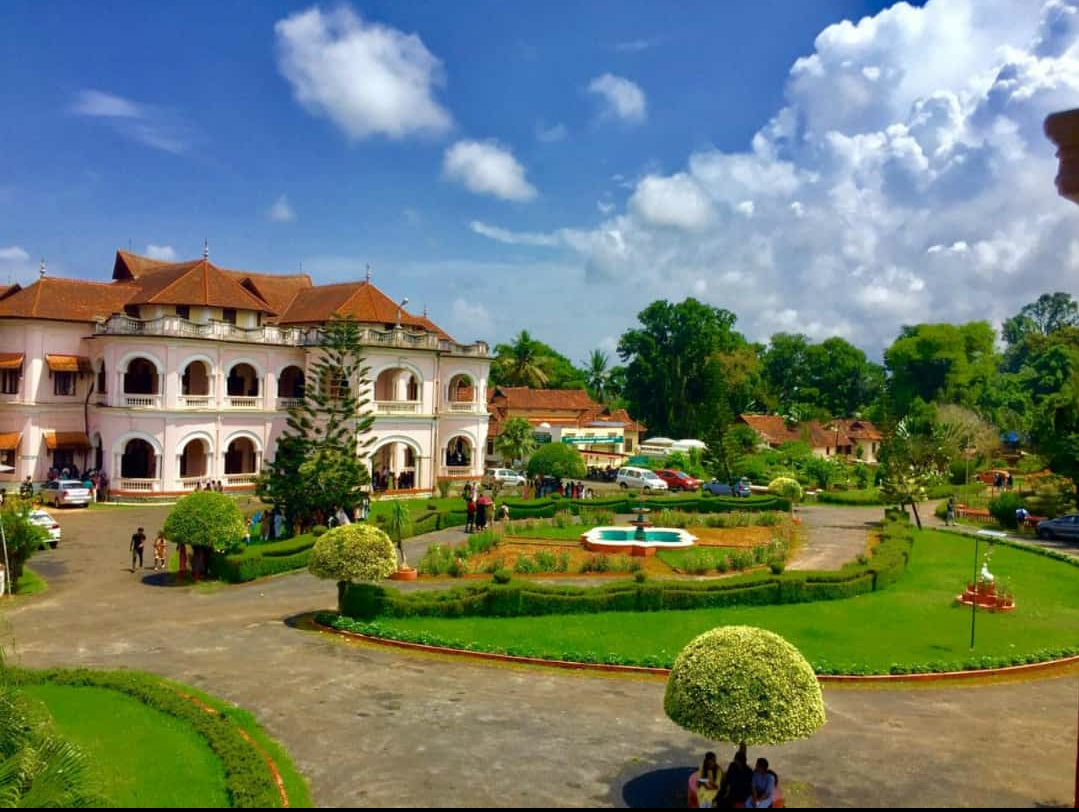
Dean's Office (Lalindloch Palace), College of Agriculture, Vellayani

College of Agriculture, Vellayani is the first agriculture college in Kerala under Kerala Agricultural University and situated in Vellayani, Thiruvananthapuram. The campus has an area of 250 hectare bordered on three sides by Vellayani Lake.

== History ==
The Lalindloch Palace of the Travancore royal family acts as the administrative block and office of the Dean of Faculty, Agriculture of the College of Agriculture, Vellayani. Senior Maharani Sethu Lakshmi Bayi, the then Regent of Travancore, lived at this palace after her regency with her daughters Lalitha and Indira. The word Lalindloch is a combination of the names Lalitha and Indira and loch, a Scottish word for lake (Vellayani Lake). In 1955, the palace and estate was handed over to the Government of Travancore–Cochin for creating the College of Agriculture, Vellayani.

Campus History https://www.researchgate.net/publication/371956328_The_Queen_The_Palace_and_The_College_Sagas_Untold_-_History_of_Maharani_Sethu_Lakshmi_Bayi_Lalindloch_Palace_and_College_of_Agriculture_Vellayani

Palace Architecture https://www.researchgate.net/publication/402863931_Lalindloch_Palace_College_of_Agriculture_Vellayani_of_Maharani_Sethu_Lakshmi_Bayi_at_Vellayani_Thiruvananthapuram_Application_of_Heritage_Informatics

== Overview ==
The College of Agriculture, Vellayani, was established in 1955 for the course B.Sc. (Hons.) Agriculture. It is one of India's leading Centers of Undergraduate and Postgraduate education in agriculture. Postgraduate programmes were started in the college in 1962. PhD courses were created in 1965. The Kerala Agricultural University was established in 1972, and the College of Agriculture, Vellayani, became a significant constituent of the University. Currently, the college offers training, workshops, seminars, conferences, certificate courses, diplomas, bachelor's, postgraduate diplomas, master's, and doctoral degrees in agriculture and allied sciences. Prof. M. C. Cherian was the first Principal and Prof. A. P. A Britto Muthunayakam was the first Vice Principal of the college. The instructional farm started functioning in 1955 and Regional Agriculture Research Station, Vellayani was established in 1981. The campus demonym is AGRICOS and the campus slogan is "IN UNITY WE STAND" .

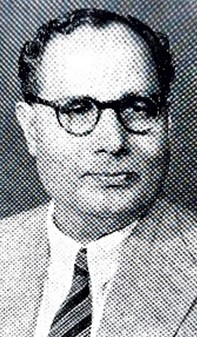
Prof. M. C. Cherian

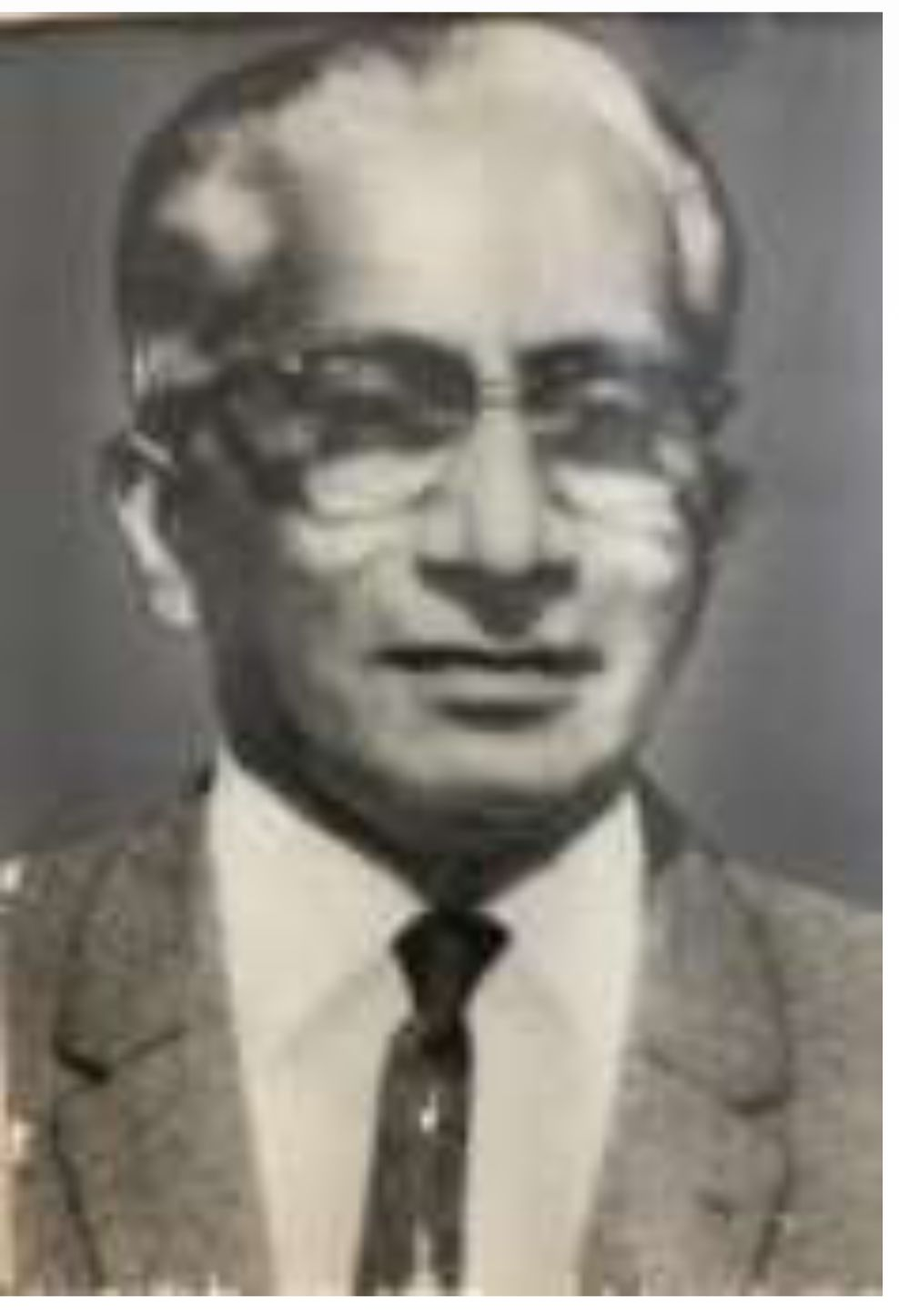
Prof. Britto Muthunayakam

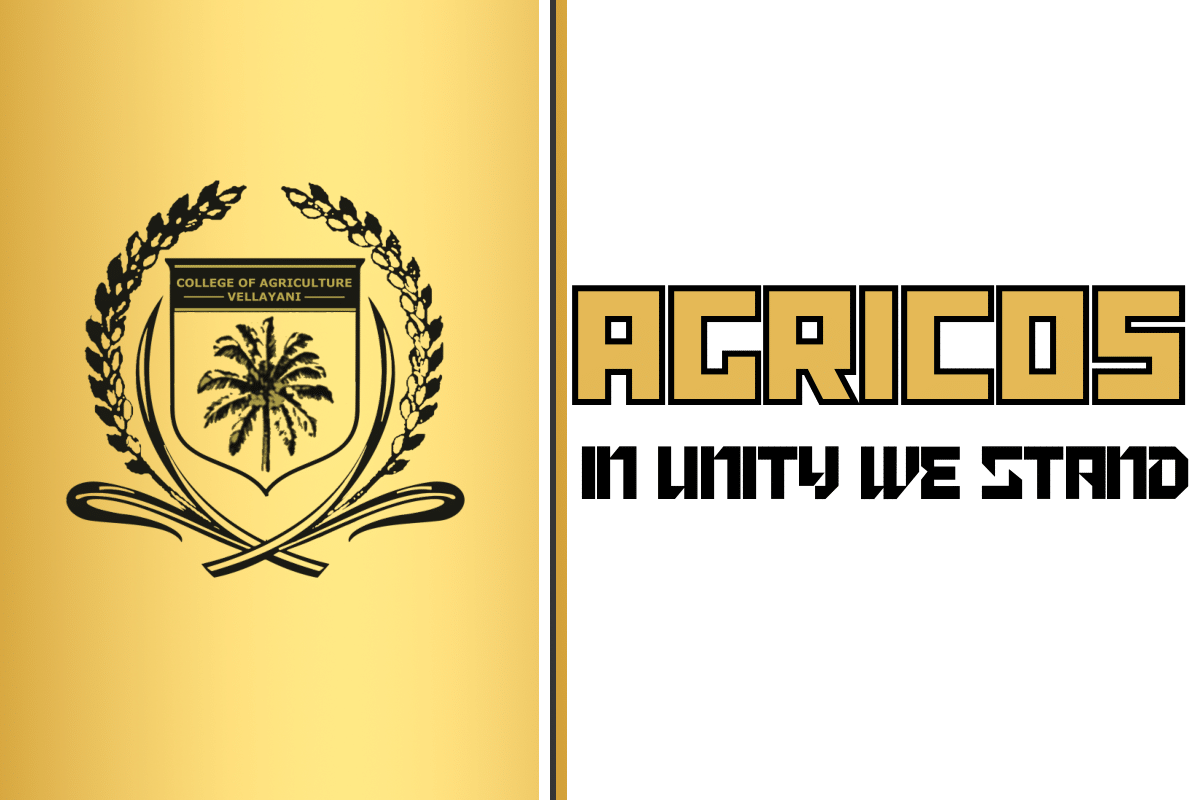
College Union Flag of College of Agriculture, Vellayani

The college ground, popularly known as the Vellyani Agricultural College Ground hosted an international under-19s Test match between India and Australia in March 1994 in which cricketers like VVS Laxman, Hrishikesh Kanitkar, Pankaj Dharmani, Sridharan Sriram from India and Michael Hussey, Andrew Symonds and Brett Lee from Australia played against each other. The ground also hosted P. Ramachandra Rao Trophy in 1989, the Ranji Trophy in 1990, 1995, 1996 and 1998, the Vijay Merchant Trophy in 1988, 1990, and 1991 and the Cooch Behar Trophy in 1990, 1991. The college hosted Taekwondo, Netball, Triathlon in the 2015 National Games of India

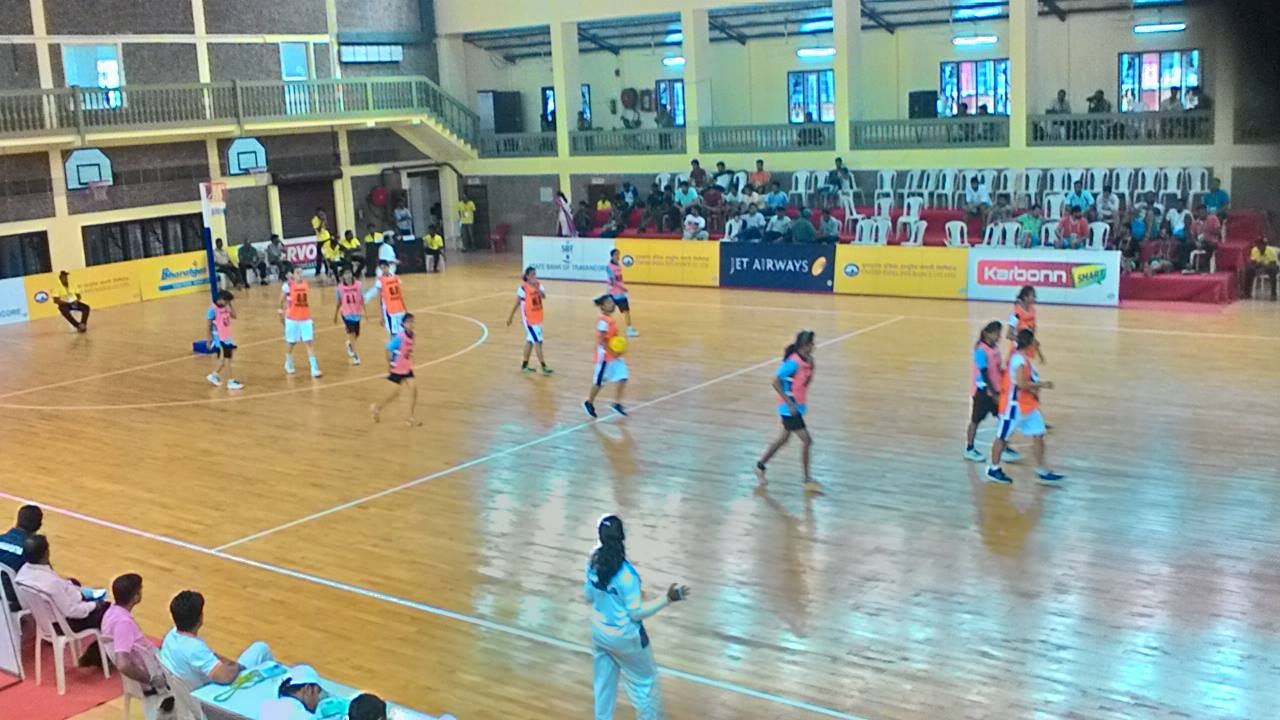
Netball (National Games, 2015) at Indoor Stadium, College of Agriculture, Vellayani

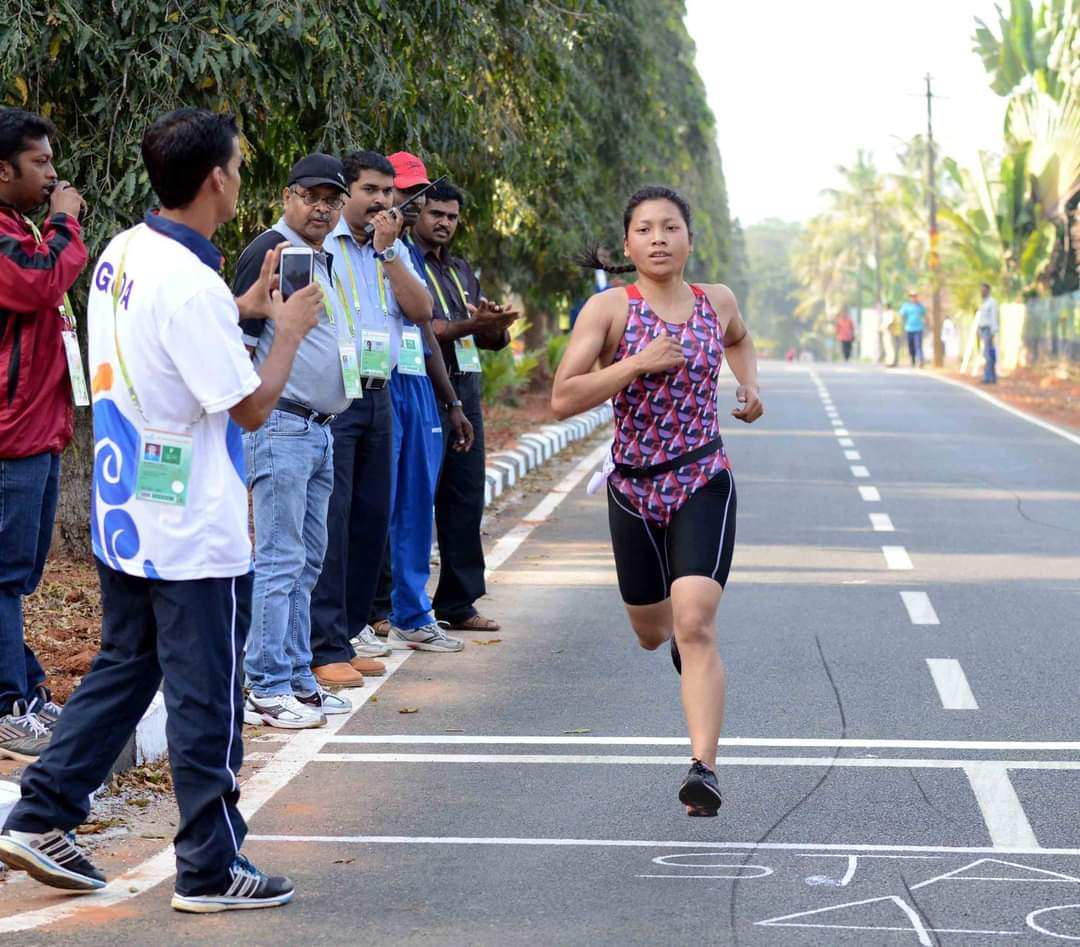
Triathlon (National Games, 2015) at College of Agriculture, Vellayani

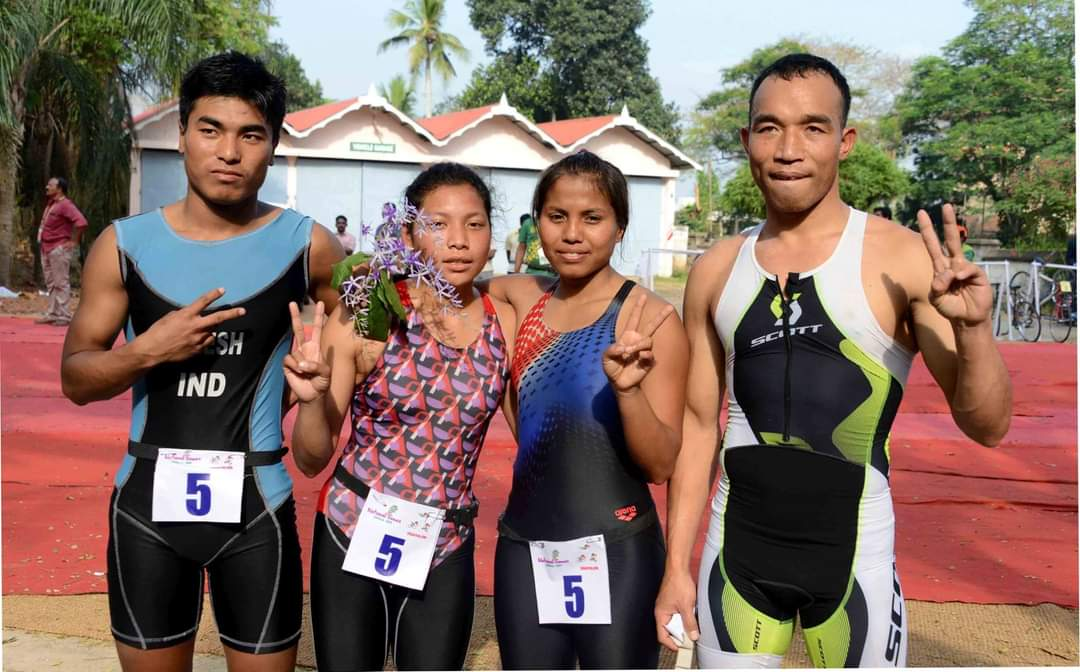
Participants of Triathlon (National Games, 2015) posing victory at College of Agriculture, Vellayani

The Alumni Association of College of Agriculture Vellayani came into being on 9 January 1999.

== List of Heads of the Institution ==
Principal

- Prof. M. C. Cherian
- Prof. L. S. S. Kumar
- Dr. C. K. N. Nair
- Prof. P. Kumara Pillai

Dean

- Dr. J. Sam Raj
- Dr. N. S. Mony
- Dr. N. Sadanandan
- Dr. M. M. Koshy
- Dr. C. Sreedharan
- Dr. P. Balakrishna Pillai
- Dr. K. M. Rajan
- Dr. P. A. Wahid
- Dr. R. Vikraman Nair
- Dr. G. Sreekandan Nair
- Dr. C. Sundareshan Nair
- Dr. K. Harikrishnan Nair
- Dr. L. Rajamony
- Dr. Sverup John
- Dr. C. S. Jayachnadran Nair
- Dr. S. Devanesan
- Dr. B. R. Reghunath
- Dr. A. Anil Kumar
- Dr. Roy Stephen
- Dr. Jacob John

== Departments ==
- Department of Agricultural Microbiology
- Department of Agricultural Economics
- Department of Agricultural Engineering
- Department of Agricultural Entomology
- Department of Agricultural Extension
- Department of Agricultural Meteorology
- Department of Agricultural Statistics
- Department of Agronomy
- Department of Biotechnology
- Department of Community Science
- Department of Floriculture and Landscape Architecture
- Department of Fruit Science
- Department of Nematology
- Department of Organic Agriculture
- Department of Physical Education
- Department of Plant Breeding & Genetics
- Department of Plant Pathology
- Department of Plant Physiology
- Department of Plantation, Spices, Medicinal and Aromatic Crops
- Department of Post Harvest Technology
- Department of Seed Science and Technology
- Department of Soil Science & Agricultural Chemistry
- Department of Vegetable Science

== Notable Alumni ==
- P. K. Ramachandran Nair, Doctor of Science, distinguished professor, University of Florida
- Jacob Thomas, Indian Police Service
- Srimat Swami Bhajanananda ji Maharaj, vice president, Ramakrishna Mission
- Shri. Ajith Radhakrishnan, senior specialist, World Bank
- Dr. Saiju Pyarajan, director, Center for Data and Computational Sciences, Harvard Medical School
- Dr. Bony De Kumar, director of operations, Yale School of Medicine
- Shri. Babu Ahmed., Indian Administrative Service
- Shri. Nizamudeen, Indian Administrative Service
- Dr. K. K. Narayanan, managing director, Metahelix Life Sciences, Tata Group
- Shri. Shaji K V, chairman, National Bank for Agriculture and Rural Development
- Dr. G. Byju, director, Central Tuber Crops Research Institute
- Shri. Jagan Gopinath, vice president, Arvind (company) Limited
- Shri. S. S. Nagesh, chief, Agriculture Division, Kerala State Planning Board, (former Assistant General Manager, National Bank for Agriculture and Rural Development)
- Dr. P. Rajendran, former vice chancellor, Kerala Agricultural University and chairman, Kerala Farmers Welfare Fund Board
- Dr. K. U. K. Nampoothiri, former director, Central Plantation Crops Research Institute
- Dr. George Thomas C., chairman, The Kerala State Biodiversity Board

== In Popular Culture ==
The palace forms a major plot in Manu S. Pillai's book, The Ivory Throne, which covers the journey of Sethu Lakshmi Bayi.

This college also witnessed Filmmaking of Films such as Ente Sooryaputhrikku, Superman (1997 film), F. I. R. (1999 film), Winner (2003 film), Celluloid (film), Vettaiyan, HER (2024, Malayalam movie) and Love Under Construction (2025, Malayalam Webseries), Sathyameva (2026, Malayalam Webseries).

The history of this campus is published as a popular article named 'The Queen, The Palace and The College: Sagas Untold - History of Maharani Sethu Lakshmi Bayi, Lalindloch Palace and College of Agriculture, Vellayani in "AHAM"; the College Magazine of College of Agriculture, Vellayani 2021-22 (pages 18-24). (Read the article @ https://www.researchgate.net/publication/371956328_The_Queen_The_Palace_and_The_College_Sagas_Untold_-_History_of_Maharani_Sethu_Lakshmi_Bayi_Lalindloch_Palace_and_College_of_Agriculture_Vellayani)

A review paper regarding the architectural marvel of the Lalindloch Palace (College of Agriculture, Vellayani), Thiruvananthapuram named "Lalindloch Palace of Maharani Sethu Lakshmi Bayi at Vellayani, Thiruvananthapuram: Application of Heritage Informatics" has been published in 'Informatics Studies' (ISSN 2583-8954 (Online). Vol. 12, Issue 3 Third Quarterly Issue. July - September 2025. P 23-40). [Read the article @ https://www.researchgate.net/publication/402863931_Lalindloch_Palace_College_of_Agriculture_Vellayani_of_Maharani_Sethu_Lakshmi_Bayi_at_Vellayani_Thiruvananthapuram_Application_of_Heritage_Informatics]
