= Slaviša Stojanović =

Slaviša Stojanović may refer to:

- Slaviša Stojanović (footballer, born 1969), Slovenian football coach
- Slaviša Stojanović (footballer, born 1989), Serbian footballer
