= Tales of Hazaribagh =

Travel memoir by Mihir Vatsa

Tales of Hazaribagh: An Intimate Exploration of Chhotanagpur Plateau
- Author: Mihir Vatsa
- Language: English
- Subject: Hazaribagh, Chhotanagpur Plateau
- Genre: Travel memoir, Non-fiction, Nature writing
- Published: August 2021
- Publisher: Speaking Tiger Books
- Publication place: India
- Media type: Print
- Pages: 216
- ISBN: 978-93-5447-038-7

Tales of Hazaribagh: An Intimate Exploration of Chhotanagpur Plateau is a travel memoir by Indian poet and writer Mihir Vatsa, published by Speaking Tiger Books in August 2021. The book describes Vatsa's return to his hometown of Hazaribagh, Jharkhand, on the Chhotanagpur Plateau, where he explores the region's geography, history, and cultural heritage over three years. It won the 2022 Sahitya Akademi Yuva Puraskar for its contribution to English literature.

== Summary ==
Mihir Vatsa's Tales of Hazaribagh: An Intimate Exploration of Chhotanagpur Plateau is a travel memoir based on Vatsa's three-year exploration of Hazaribagh, Jharkhand, on the Chhotanagpur Plateau, starting in January 2017. After returning to Hazaribagh from Delhi to recover from depression, Vatsa visited sites such as Surajkund and the Karanpura Valley, which are known for their prehistoric settlements. The book describes the region's rivers, waterfalls, forests, and environmental issues, while exploring its colonial history, referencing figures like Captain Robert Smith and Sir Charles D'Oyly, and citing archival sources such as P.C. Roy Choudhury's Hazaribagh Old Records. It also covers the plateau's tribal heritage and administrative changes. The memoir's seven chapters and epilogue combine personal experiences with reflections on nature, history, and identity, ending with Vatsa's return to Delhi.

== Development and release ==
The concept for Tales of Hazaribagh emerged in January 2017 when Vatsa returned to Hazaribagh, seeking solace from depression. Inspired by childhood memories and the plateau's landscape, he began documenting his travels. Vatsa conducted research using archival materials, including Thomson's geographical surveys and India Office Records from the British Library, and consulted local historian Bulu Imam. He also visited the Sanskriti Museum and Art Gallery in Hazaribagh. Vatsa wrote the first draft in April 2019, combining his travels with historical and cultural insights. The book was published by Speaking Tiger Books in August 2021 as a 216-page paperback and e-book, featuring maps and photographs, with a cover inspired by the Tilaiya Dam reservoir. It gained prominence after winning the 2022 Sahitya Akademi Yuva Puraskar and reaching Amazon's bestseller list.

== Critical reception ==
Reviews of Tales of Hazaribagh were mixed, with critics praising its lyrical prose and unique blend of travel, history, and personal reflection, while some noted minor flaws. The Hindu described it as "a new form of non-chauvinistic, deeply immersive writing", commending Vatsa's restraint in avoiding romanticisation of Hazaribagh. The Telegraph noted that the narrative enriches readers by uncovering the plateau's history, politics, and environmental issues through Vatsa's journeys. Hindustan Times highlighted the "redemptive potential of travel" but critiqued occasional overwrought prose, such as Vatsa's comparison of Hazaribagh Lake to Delhi's Khan Market. Business Standard called it a "poignant and lyrical genre-defying book", appreciating Vatsa's poetic narration of history and personal stories. Mint praised its "gentle, preternaturally wise voice" in addressing modernity's challenges. Scroll.in lauded its detailed exploration of Hazaribagh's geography and history. The Pioneer commended its "chiselled prose" and therapeutic portrayal of nature. Hansda Sowvendra Shekhar described it as "a book that will be remembered" for its evocative storytelling. Some reviewers noted minor flaws. Hindustan Times found Vatsa's self-conscious humor, such as metaphors about waterfalls, occasionally disruptive. Despite this, the book is widely regarded as a significant contribution to Indian non-fiction.
