= Jackfruit Festival =

Festival in Kerala, India

Jackfruit Festival or Chakka Mahotsavam is a festival in the different districts of Kerala, aimed at spreading public awareness of the health benefits and market potential of jackfruit. Jackfruit is the official state fruit of Kerala since 2018 due to its high production and its market potential.

In May 2017, The National Jackfruit Promotion Council (NJPC) and Aranmula Heritage Trust organised the festival in Aranmula, Pathanamthitta.

In August 2017, The NJPC and College of Agriculture, Vellayani organised the festival in Kanakakkunnu, Thiruvananthapuram.
