= Devapriya =

Devapriya is both a given name and a surname. Notable people with the name include:

- Devapriya Roy (born 1984), Indian author
- Isura Devapriya, Sri Lankan politician
- Hemantha Devapriya (born 1958), Sri Lankan cricketer
