= Kireedam =

Kireedam (Malayalam, Tamil "The Crown") can refer to either:

- Kireedam (1989 film), an Indian Malayalam film directed by Sibi Malayil and starring Mohanlal
- Kireedam (2007 film), an Indian Tamil film and the remake of the Malayalam film, directed by A. L. Vijay and starring Ajith Kumar
