= 2018–19 Kerala Premier League =

6th season of Kerala Premier League

Kerala Premier League
- Season: 2018–19 (6th Season)
- Champions: Indian Navy (1st title)
- Promoted: FC Kerala
- Matches: 35
- Goals: 110 (3.14 per match)
- Best player: (Ghana) Christian Sabha(GKFC)
- Top goalscorer: (India) Vishnu(SUP) (Liberia) Harry Moris(FCK) (India) Bibake Thapa(IN) (Ghana) Christian Sabah (GKFC) (6 goals)
- Best goalkeeper: (India) Vishnu(IN)
- Biggest home win: RFC Kochi 6–2 Kerala Blasters FC Reserves (16 December 2018); Shooters United Padne 6-2 Kovalam FC (06.04.2019)
- Biggest away win: Golden Threads 1–7 F.C. Kerala (28 December 2018)
- Highest scoring: RFC Kochi 6–2 Kerala Blasters FC Reserves (16 December 2018); Golden Threads 1–7 F.C. Kerala (28 December 2018); Shooters United Padne 6-2 Kovalam FC (06.04.2019)
- Longest winning run: Gokulam Kerala (8 games)
- Longest unbeaten run: Gokulam Kerala FC (8 games)
- Longest winless run: Kovalam FC (8 games)
- Longest losing run: Kovalam FC (8 games)
- All statistics correct as of 16 April 2019.

The 2018–19 Kerala Premier League Season was the sixth season of the Kerala Premier League. The season featured 11 teams which was divided into 2 groups and is played on a home-and-away format. The season kicked off on 16 December 2018. Kozhikode Quartz, SBI Kerala and Trikaripur withdrawn from the league due to financial problems.

== Teams ==
Locations of the 2018–19 Kerala Premier League teams

Central Excise, Cochin Port Trust and Kerala Police are pulled out from the 2018–19 season. Golden Threads, RFC Kochi, Kovalam FC along with Indian Navy were added making 2018–19 season a 11-team affair.

=== Stadiums and locations ===
Team	Stadium	Capacity
Golden Threads	Ambedkar Stadium, Ernakulam	10,000
FC Kerala	Thrissur Municipal Corporation Stadium	15,000
FC Thrissur	Thrissur Municipal Corporation Stadium	15,000
Gokulam Kerala FC	EMS Stadium	80,000
Shooters United Padne	Nadakkavu Synthetic Turf Ground, Trikaripur	10,000
Sports Academy Tirur	Rajiv Gandhi Municipal Stadium, Tirur	10,000
Kerala Blasters FC Reserves	Sports Council Ground, Panampilly Nagar, Kochi	-
RFC Kochi	Maharaja's College Stadium, Kochi	15,000
Kovalam FC	University Stadium, Thiruvananthapuram	20,000
Indian Navy	Maharaja's College Stadium, Kochi	15,000

=== Head coaches ===
Club	Head Coach
Golden Threads	
Shooters United Padne	(India) Sidique Kalyaseri
FC Kerala	(India) T.G. Purushothaman
FC Thrissur	(India) Jali P.Ibrahim
Gokulam Kerala FC	(India) Rajeev P
Sports Academy Tirur	
Kerala Blasters FC Reserves	(India) Renjith T. A
RFC Kochi	(India) Soly Xavier
Kovalam FC	(India) Ebin Rose

=== Foreign players ===
Clubs can sign maximum four players of any nationality but only three is allowed in the playing eleven.

Club	Player 1	Player 2	Player 3	Player 4
Golden Threads	(Ghana) Issahak Nuhu Seidu	(Ivory Coast) Imane Said Usman Karamoko	-	-
FC Kerala	(Nigeria) Ekomobong Victor Philip	(Afghanistan) Ismail Aseel	(Liberia) Harry Moris	(Ivory Coast) Lassini karamoko
FC Thrissur	(Nigeria) Uche Gold Odinukaeze	(Ghana) Santa Crus Yemoh	-	-
Gokulam Kerala FC	(Ghana) Christian Sabah	(Ghana) Daniel Addo	(Ghana) Charles Teiko Folley	-
Shooters United Padne	(Liberia) Snyder Yao Titriku	(Ivory Coast) Ouattara Tho Adama	(Liberia) Eric Weaks	-
Sports Academy Tirur	(Ghana) Musha Bambatelli Moctar	(Sierra Leone) Ibrahim Kabba	-	-
Kerala Blasters FC Reserves	(Serbia) Slaviša Stojanović	-	-	-
RFC Kochi	(Ivory Coast) Rooney Yousef	(Ivory Coast) Ouattara Sie	(South Africa) Lwandile Mzizi	-
Kovalam FC	-	-	-	-

== Results ==
=== Group A ===
Pos	Team	Pld	W	D	L	GF	GA	GD	Pts	Qualification
1	Indian Navy	6	4	0	2	10	7	+3	12	Advance to Semi-finals
2	Kerala Blasters FC Reserves	6	4	0	2	10	9	+1	12	Advance to Semi-finals
3	RFC Kochi	6	2	0	4	8	10	−2	6	
4	Sports Academy Tirur	6	2	0	4	6	8	−2	6	
5	FC Thrissur	0	0	0	0	0	0	0	0	Withdrawn
6	State Bank Of India	0	0	0	0	0	0	0	0	Withdrawn

Source: KFA

==== Fixtures and results ====
Source: fanport
Cancelled Matches

16 December 2018	RFC Kochi	6–2	Kerala Blasters FC Reserves	Kochi
18:30 IST	Don 6'; Rooney 17', 88'; Astilee 43'; Ajith 45+1'; Quattara 80'	Report	Pritam Kumar 57'; Lalthakima 61'	Stadium: Maharaja's College Stadium

19 December 2018	SBI Kerala	1-2	Sports Academy Tirur	Thiruvananthapuram
18:30 IST	Season	Report	Mohamed Salah; Mohamed Nisham	Stadium: Police Stadium

22 December 2018	SBI Kerala	2-2	RFC Kochi	Thiruvananthapuram
18:30 IST	Prasoon R 45'; Johnson 65'	Report	Mashood 21'; Ajith 61'	Stadium: Police Stadium

27 December 2018	Sports Academy Tirur	2-2	SBI Kerala	Tirur
18:30 IST	Mohamed Nisham 33'; Rashid 90+1'	Report	S B Martin; Usman	Stadium: Rajiv Gandhi Municipal Stadium

27 December 2018	Kerala Blasters FC Reserves	3–1	RFC Kochi	Kochi
18:30 IST	Afdal VK 20', 94'; Hrishi Dhath	Report	Mashood	Stadium: Sports Council Ground, P'Nagar

2 January 2019	Kerala Blasters FC Reserves	0–0	SBI Kerala	Kochi
18:30 IST		Report		Stadium: Sports Council Ground, P'Nagar

2 January 2019	Sports Academy Tirur	1–2	FC Thrissur	Tirur
18:30 IST	Fasalu Rahman	Report	Jibin Devassy 40', 49'	Stadium: Rajiv Gandhi Municipal Stadium

19 March 2019	RFC Kochi	1–0	Sports Academy Tirur	Kochi
15:30 IST	Rooney 26'	Report		Stadium: Maharaja's College Stadium

22 March 2019	FC Thrissur	2–2	Sports Academy Tirur	Thrissur
15:30 IST	Akhil 59'; Bineesh Balan 90'	Report	Ibrahim Kabba 49'; Ayoob 67'	Stadium: Thrissur Municipal Corporation Stadium

26 March 2019	Sports Academy Tirur	0–2	Kerala Blasters FC Reserves	Tirur
18:30 IST			Abhijit 47'; Surag chetri 61'	Stadium: Rajiv Gandhi Municipal Stadium

30 March 2019	FC Thrissur	2-0	RFC Kochi	Thrissur
15:30 IST	Santa Cruz 18' 37'			Stadium: Thrissur Municipal Corporation Stadium

31 March 2019	Kerala Blasters FC Reserves	1-0	Sports Academy Tirur	Kochi
15:30 IST	Jithin M S 38'			Stadium: Sports Council Ground, P'Nagar

3 April 2019	FC Thrissur	1-2	Kerala Blasters FC Reserves	Thrissur
15:30 IST	Vishnu Raj 43'		Jithin M S 44' 86'	Stadium: Thrissur Municipal Corporation Stadium

6 April 2019	Sports Academy Tirur	1-0	RFC Kochi	Tirur
15:30 IST	Shafeek 71'			Stadium: Rajiv Gandhi Municipal Stadium

6 April 2019	Kerala Blasters FC Reserves	1-2	FC Thrissur	Kochi
15:30 IST	Suraj 82'		Sibil 31'; Uche 66'	Stadium: Sports Council Ground, P'Nagar

9 April 2019	RFC Kochi	3-1	FC Thrissur	Kochi
15:30 IST	Rooney 7'; Lwandile Mzizi 46' 77'		Bineesh Balan 79'	Stadium: Maharaja's College Stadium

18 April 2019	Sports Academy Tirur	2-0	Indian Navy	Tirur
16:00 IST	Muhammad nisham 26' Shafeek 90'			Stadium: Rajiv Gandhi Municipal Stadium

24 April 2019	RFC Kochi	0-1	Indian Navy	Kochi
16:00 IST			Riyad 33'	Stadium: Maharaja's College Stadium

27 April 2019	Kerala Blasters FC Reserves	2-1	Indian Navy	Kochi
16:00 IST	Satgouthang konoung 4'; Slaviša Stojanović 27'		Hari Krishna 41'	Stadium: Sports Council Ground, P'Nagar

3 May 2019	Indian Navy	4-3	Sports Academy Tirur	Kochi
16:00 IST	Bipaka Thapa 10' 78'; Inayat 49'; Harikrishna 69'		Moosa 16' 62'; Fasalu Rahman 85'	Stadium: Maharaja's College Stadium

5 May 2019	Indian Navy	3-0	RFC Kochi	Kochi
16:00 IST	Bipaka Thapa 20' 26'; Raman Rai 54'			Stadium: Maharaja's College Stadium

8 May 2019	Indian Navy	1-0	Kerala Blasters FC Reserves	Kochi
16:00 IST	Bipaka Thapa 43'			Stadium: Maharaja's College Stadium

=== Group B ===
Pos	Team	Pld	W	D	L	GF	GA	GD	Pts	Qualification
1	Gokulam Kerala FC	8	8	0	0	16	5	+11	24	Advance to Semi-finals
2	FC Kerala	8	5	1	2	20	10	+10	16	Advance to Semi-finals
3	Shooters United Padne	8	4	1	3	19	14	+5	13	
4	Golden Threads	8	2	0	6	9	21	−12	6	
5	Kovalam FC	8	0	0	8	6	20	−14	0	

Source: KFA

==== Fixtures and results ====
Source: fanport

22 December 2018	Kovalam FC	0-1	Golden Threads	Thiruvananthapuram
18:30 IST		Report	Arun K J 73'	Stadium: Vellyani Agricultural College Ground

28 December 2018	Golden Threads	1-7	FC Kerala	Ernakulam
18:30 IST	Ajith 38'	Report	Ekomobong Philip 12', 33' Usman 49', 77' Jis 53' Nikhil 88' OG 85'	Stadium: Ambedkar Stadium; Attendance: 50

31 December 2018	Gokulam Kerala	1-0	Kovalam FC	Kozhikode
18:30 IST	Shihad 67'	Report		Stadium: EMS Stadium

17 March 2019	Kovalam FC	1-3	Shooters United Padne	Thiruvananthapuram
15:30 IST	Beniston (-)	Report	Surbin (-); Eric Weeks (-); Dipin Das(OG) (-)	Stadium: Vellyani Agricultural College Ground

17 March 2019	Gokulam Kerala	3-0	Golden Threads	Kozhikode
15:30 IST	N Shihad 28'; Christian Sabah 74'; Thahir Zaman 80'	Report		Stadium: EMS Stadium

20 March 2019	Gokulam Kerala	2-1	FC Kerala	Kozhikode
15:30 IST	Christian Sabah 18'; Mayakannan 32'	Report	Victor Philip 58'	Stadium: EMS Stadium

20 March 2019	Golden Threads	1-2	Shooters United Padne	Kochi
15:30 IST	Arjun 76'	Report	Musammil 12'; Nisamuddin 20'	Stadium: Ambedkar Stadium

23 March 2019	FC Kerala	2-1	Shooters United Padne	Thrissur
15:30 IST	Harry Morris 17' 60'	Report	Vishnu 72'	Stadium: Thrissur Municipal Corporation Stadium

23 March 2019	Kovalam FC	0-1	Gokulam Kerala	Thiruvananthapuram
15:30 IST		Report	Christian Sabah 80'	Stadium: Vellyani Agricultural College Ground

27 March 2019	Golden Threads	1-3	Gokulam Kerala	Ernakulam
15:30 IST	Muhammad Jasim 57' (o.g.)	Report	Shihad 10'; Ganesan 44'; Mohammed Vaseem 90+1' (o.g.)	Stadium: Ambedkar Stadium

29 March 2019	Gokulam Kerala	2-1	Shooters United Padne	Kozhikode
15:30 IST	Shihad 35'; Christian Sabah 90+1'	Report	Vishnu 75'	Stadium: EMS Stadium

31 March 2019	Kovalam FC	0-1	FC Kerala	Thiruvananthapuram
15:30 IST			Ekomobong Victor Philip 24'	Stadium: Vellyani Agricultural College Ground

31 March 2019	Shooters United Padne	3-2	Golden Threads	Trikaripur
15:30 IST	Muhammad Razi 40'; Vishnu P V 48'; Asfar K P 88'		Issahak Nuwu Seyd 36' 68'	Stadium: Nadakkavu Synthetic Turf Ground

3 April 2019	Golden Threads	3-1	Kovalam FC	Ernakulam
15:30 IST	Prakash 12' (o.g.); Issahak Nuwu Seyd 21' 53'		Baiju 43'	Stadium: Ambedkar Stadium

3 April 2019	Shooters United Padne	1-2	Gokulam Kerala	Trikaripur
15:30 IST	Sajeer 89'		Shihad 38'; Shibil Muhammed 59'	Stadium: Nadakkavu Synthetic Turf Ground

6 April 2019	FC Kerala	1-2	Gokulam Kerala	Thrissur
15:30 IST	Usman Sayyed		Sabah 40'; Sanju 45'	Stadium: Thrissur Municipal Corporation Stadium

6 April 2019	Shooters United Padne	6-2	Kovalam FC	Trikaripur
15:30 IST	Vishnu 24' 45' 55' Surbin Sudhin		Goal	Stadium: Nadakkavu Synthetic Turf Ground

10 April 2019	Shooters United Padne	2-2	FC Kerala	Trikaripur
15:30 IST	srubin 54'; Abdul Haque 62'		Rahil 39' harry moris 68'	Stadium: Nadakkavu Synthetic Turf Ground

13 April 2019	FC Kerala	2-0	Golden Threads	Thrissur
15:30 IST	harry morris 21' 58'			Stadium: Thrissur Municipal Corporation Stadium

15 April 2019	FC Kerala	4-2	Kovalam FC	Thrissur
15:30 IST	Babble 2'; Raju 76' harry morris 86'; Nikhil 87'		Beniston 12'; Jaison 24'	Stadium: Thrissur Municipal Corporation Stadium

=== Knockout stage ===
Semi-finals
A1	Indian Navy	2
B2	FC Kerala	0
A2	Kerala Blasters FC Reserves	0(4)
B1	Gokulam Kerala	0(5)

Final
Indian Navy	1(6)
Gokulam Kerala	1(5)

==== Fixtures and results ====
Semi-Finals

11 May 2019	Indian Navy	2-0	FC Kerala	Kozhikode
4:00 PM (IST)	Britto PM 51'; Bipaka Thapa 85'			Stadium: EMS Stadium

12 May 2019	Kerala Blasters FC Reserves	0-0 (4–5 p)	Gokulam Kerala	Kozhikode
4:00 PM (IST)				Stadium: EMS Stadium
	Penalties
	Naryan (penalty missed); Shahajas (penalty scored); Pragyan (penalty scored); Jacob (penalty scored); Suraj (penalty scored)		Shibil (penalty scored); Sanju (penalty scored); Justin (penalty scored); Bijesh (penalty scored); Sabah (penalty scored)

Final

18 May 2019	Indian Navy	1-1 (6-5 p)	Gokulam Kerala	Kozhikode
4:00 PM (IST)	Britto PM 79'		Christian Sabha 81'	Stadium: EMS Stadium
	Penalties
	Harikrishna (penalty scored); Riyad (penalty missed); Raman rai (penalty scored); Shahir (penalty scored); Sunil (penalty scored); Britto PM (penalty scored); Abhishek (penalty scored)		Shibil (penalty scored); Thahir (penalty missed); Sanju (penalty scored); Justin (penalty scored); Sabah (penalty scored) muthu (penalty scored); Shameel (penalty missed)

== Season statistics ==
=== Scoring ===
As of 18 May 2019

==== Top scorers ====
No	Player	Club	Goals
1	(India) Vishnu	Shooters United Padne	6
1	(India) Bipaka Thapa	Indian Navy (football club)	6
1	(Liberia) Harry Moris	FC Kerala	6
1	(Ghana) Christian Sabah	Gokulam Kerala FC	6
5	(India) Shihad	Gokulam Kerala FC	4
5	(Nigeria) Ekomobong Philip	FC Kerala	4
5	(Ivory Coast) Rooney Youseff	RFC Kochi	4
5	(Ghana) Issahak Nuhu Seidu	Golden Threads F.C.	4
5	(India) Suribin	Shooters United Padne	4
10	(India) Mohamed Nisham	Sports Academy Tirur	3
10	(India) Jithin MS	Kerala Blasters FC Reserves	3
