= Priya Kuriyan =

Indian comic book writer, illustrator and animation filmmaker

- Education: National Institute of Design, Ahmedabad (2004)
- Occupations: Comic book writer, illustrator, animation filmmaker
- Awards: Big Little Book Award (2019)

Priya Kuriyan is an Indian comic book writer, illustrator and animation filmmaker, based in Bengaluru, Karnataka.

== Education ==
Kuriyan graduated from the National Institute of Design, Ahmedabad, in 2004.

== Career ==
She began her career as an illustrator for Tulika Books. Since then, she has been the illustrator for over 100 books and collaborated with a number of writers including Ruskin Bond, Manu S. Pillai, Natasha Sharma, Meera Nair, Jerry Pinto and Radhika Chadha. She has also collaborated with the author Devapriya Roy for the graphic novel Indira (2018), based on the life of the former prime minister Indira Gandhi.

As an animation filmmaker, Kuriyan directed educational animation films for the Children's Film Society, India, and episodes for the Indian edition of Sesame Street (Galli Galli Sim Sim).

She is the author of the comic book Ammachi's Glass, and the author of the children's picture book adaptation of Perumal Murugan's novel Poonachi.

== Awards ==
Kuriyan was the recipient of the Big Little Book Award at the Mumbai Literature Festival in 2019.

== Books ==
- Drawing the Line: Indian Women Fight Back (co-editor with Larissa Bertonasco and Ludmilla Bartscht, 2015). Zubaan Books. ISBN 978-0-99-405071-7.
- Ammachi's Glasses (2017). Tulika Books. ISBN 978-93-5046-908-8.
- Poonachi: Lost in the Forest (2020). Red Panda Westland. ISBN 978-9-38-964831-7.
