= Neon Noon =

Neon Noon is a book by Tanuj Solanki which was published on July 10, 2016 by HarperCollins.

== Critical reception and reviews ==
Business Line wrote "Tanuj Solanki’s debut is a smart, wryly funny book about love and loss in yuppie-land", Henna Rakheja of Hindustan Times wrote "This compact novel by Tanuj Solanki appears to be a jigsaw puzzle in the beginning. In the author’s own words: A short story can be a sprawling mess too.", Supriya Sharma wrote "Tanuj Solanki’s debut novel is an account of coming to terms with one of the oldest afflictions known to humankind – heartbreak" and Neha Bhatt of Scroll.in wrote "Tanuj Solanki’s debut ‘Neon Noon’ is enigmatic, moody, ingenious – and strangely gripping".

The book has been also reviewed by Manik Sharma of Firstpost.

The book was longlisted for Tata Literature Live! First Book Award in Fiction category.
