= Tanuj Solanki =

Indian writer

Tanuj Solanki is an Indian writer who is the founder of Bombay Literary Magazine and author of Diwali in Muzaffarnagar, Neon Noon, The Machine Is Learning and Manjhi's Mayhem. His short fiction, essays, book reviews and op-eds have been featured in publications such as The New Indian Express, The Caravan, Scroll.in, Frontline and Granta.

== Published works ==
Works
No.	Name	Publisher	Publishing Date	Ref
1.	Neon Noon	HarperCollins	July 10, 2016	
2.	Diwali in Muzaffarnagar	HarperCollins	January 25, 2018	
3.	The Machine Is Learning	Pan Macmillan	April 2, 2020	
4.	Manjhi's Mayhem	Penguin India	November 21, 2022	

== Awards and honors ==
- Longlisted for Tata Literature Live! First Book Award in Fiction category for Neon Noon
- Sahitya Akademi Yuva Puraskar in English for Diwali in Muzaffarnagar
- Longlisted for JCB Prize for The Machine Is Learning
- The Machine Is Learning was listed in "Top 10 fiction books of 2020" by The Hindu
- Manjhi's Mayhem was listed as an interesting book by The Financial Express
