= Manjhi's Mayhem =

2022 book by Tanuj Solanki

- Author: Tanuj Solanki
- Publication date: November 1, 2022
- ISBN: 9780143458449

Manjhi's Mayhem is a book by Tanuj Solanki which was published on November 21, 2022, by Penguin Books.

== Critical reception ==
Rachna Chhabria of Deccan Chronicle wrote "The book is a decent read. I get the feeling that Manjhi will figure in more books; that Solanki has more plans for this likeable hero." G. Sampath of The Hindu wrote "Tanuj Solanki new crime thriller 'Manjhi's Mayhem' makes one of society's 'extras', a Dalit, the prime mover". Sayari Debnath of Scroll.in wrote "Tanuj Solanki has masterfully constructed the exhilarating underbelly of Mumbai whose stories we have so come to love." Saurabh Sharma of Moneycontrol wrote "Manjhi's Mayhem is a unique literary fiction" and Mayank Jain Parichha of The New Indian Express described the novel as "an important work of contemporary fiction". The Financial Express listed it as an interesting book.
