= Lords of the Deccan =

2022 book by Anirudh Kanisetti

- Author: Anirudh Kanisetti
- Language: English
- Subject: Medieval South Indian history
- Genre: Non-fiction, history
- Published: 2022
- Publisher: Juggernaut Books
- Publication place: India
- Media type: Print

Lords of the Deccan is a 2022 non-fiction history book by Indian public historian Anirudh Kanisetti. It explores the medieval history of South India, focusing on the Chalukya, Rashtrakuta, and Chola empires, and their political, military, and cultural contributions. Published by Juggernaut Books, the book was released in 2022 and received the Tata Literature Live! Book of the Year Award in the non-fiction category and the Sahitya Akademi Yuva Puraskar for English in the same year.

== Summary ==
Lords of the Deccan chronicles the history of South Indian empires from the 6th to the 12th centuries, focusing on the Chalukyas, Rashtrakutas, and Cholas. Written in a first-person narrative by Kanisetti, the book examines the political structures, military campaigns, and cultural developments of these empires, including their contributions to temple architecture and trade networks. It highlights figures such as Pulakeshin II and the role of merchant guilds in economic systems. The book also addresses social issues, including the treatment of women and slaves in medieval South Indian society. Kanisetti's narrative aims to integrate South India's regional history into broader Indian historical narratives, challenging North India-centric perspectives.

== Development and release ==
The idea for Lords of the Deccan emerged from Kanisetti's work as a public historian, aiming to make South Indian history accessible to a broader audience. Kanisetti spent four years researching, editing, and fact-checking the book, drawing on historical records and archaeological evidence. The book was published by Juggernaut Books in 2022. A Telugu-language series adaptation was announced by actor Rana Daggubati at Comic-Con USA in July 2023.

== Critical reception ==
Critical reviews of Lords of the Deccan were generally positive. The book was praised for its engaging narrative and focus on the understudied Deccan region. A review in India Today noted its accessibility and vivid storytelling, calling it a valuable contribution to Indian historical literature. Business Standard commended Kanisetti for challenging conventional historical narratives by highlighting South India's contributions. The Telegraph India described it as a compelling read that brings lesser-known histories to life. Frontline highlighted how he brought the audience's attention towards the Deccan, which is often ignored in historical discussions. However, some reviews were critical. A review in Loksatta praised the book's research but suggested it could have been more concise in parts where the architect's name could've been mentioned.
