= Saurav Jha =

Author

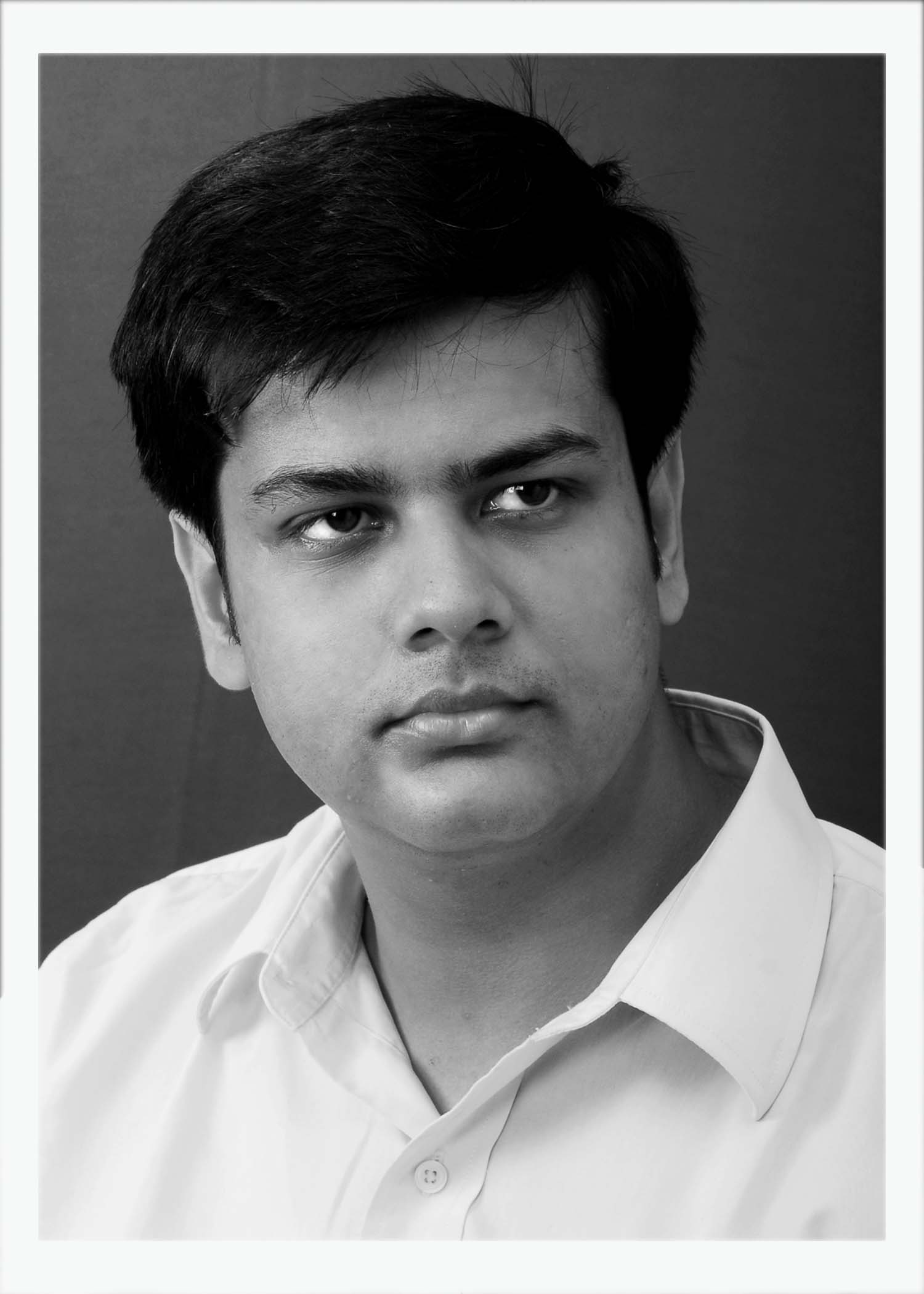
- Education: Presidency College, Kolkata; Jawaharlal Nehru University
- Occupation: Author

Saurav Jha is an Indian economic analyst, author, and commentator on geostrategic affairs. His first book, The Upside Down Book of Nuclear Power, was published by HarperCollins in March 2010 and it was translated into several Indian languages. Jha has written for publications such as Le Monde Diplomatique, World Politics Review, The Diplomat, as well as national dailies such as Deccan Herald, The Telegraph and Hindustan Times.

== Biography ==
An alumnus of Presidency College, Kolkata, and Jawaharlal Nehru University, Jha's second book The Heat and Dust Project: the Broke Couple’s Guide to Bharat, co-written with wife, Devapriya Roy, was published on 24 May 2015 and debuted at no.1 on the Hindustan Times-A.C. Nielsen list, and became a bestseller. It chronicles the story of travelling through India on local buses "on a very very tight budget". The Heat and Dust Project, is also a first-of-its-kind dynamic book as the couple used Facebook to document their journey even as it was underway. In August 2022, Jha published his serious non-fiction book called Negotiating The New Normal, charting the course for India's economic recovery after the COVID-19 pandemic. In 2017, he founded the online journal Delhi Defence Review.
