= Kireedam (1989 film) =

1989 film by Sibi Malayil

- Theatrical poster
- Directed by: Sibi Malayil
- Written by: A. K. Lohithadas
- Produced by: Dinesh Panicker; N Krishnakumar
- Starring: Mohanlal; Thilakan; Parvathy Jayaram; Mohan Raj
- Cinematography: S. Kumar
- Edited by: L. Bhoominathan
- Music by: Johnson
- Production company: Kripa Films
- Distributed by: Seven Arts Release
- Release date: 7 July 1989 (Kerala)
- Running time: 140 minutes
- Country: India
- Language: Malayalam
- Budget: ₹23.5 lakh

Kireedam is a 1989 Indian Malayalam-language psychological action drama film directed by Sibi Malayil and written by A. K. Lohithadas, starring Mohanlal, Thilakan, Parvathy Jayaram, Mohan Raj and Sankaradi, with music composed by Johnson. Widely regarded as a landmark of Malayalam cinema, the film is noted for its powerful performances, emotional depth, realistic storytelling and enduring cultural impact. Mohanlal's performance is considered one of the defining achievements of his career.

The film is about a youth, Sethumadhavan (Mohanlal), whose hopes and aspirations are shattered by a combination of fate and human falling. It explores how society type-casts individuals and forces them to act that part whether they like it or not. Mohanlal won the National Film Award – Special Mention "for portraying young man's agony and pain marvellously and in unique style". Lohithadas won the Kerala Film Critics Award for Best Screenplay. The title 'Kireedam' refers to the metaphorical crown that the villagers of Ramapuram bestows upon Sethumadhavan after he kills Keerikadan Jose.

Kireedam was released on 7 July 1989. It was a major commercial success at the box office. It received widespread critical acclaim and praise for the performances of Mohanlal and Thilakan, the screenplay, and the soundtrack. It is regarded as one of the classics in Indian cinema. A sequel to the film titled Chenkol was released in 1993. Kireedam was remade into six other languages — in Telugu as Rowdyism Nasinchali (1990), in Kannada as Modada Mareyalli (1991), in Hindi as Gardish (1993), in Bangladesh as Babar Adesh (1995), in Odia as Mayusaa (2001) and in Tamil under the same title (2007) - becoming Mohanlal's first movie to be remade in six other languages. In 2007, it became the third Indian movie to be remade in five other languages after Poovinu Puthiya Poonthennal and Anuraga Aralithu.

== Plot ==
Achuthan Nair, an honest police constable, lives with his wife Ammu, two sons and two daughters. He maintains an amicable and close bond with his elder son, Sethumadhavan, and aspires to see him become an inspector. Sethu is engaged to Devi, his maternal cross cousin. After filing a minor charge against the son of a local MLA, Achuthan Nair is transferred to the Ramapuram police station as a punishment, prompting his family to relocate with him.

Keerikadan Jose, a ruthless criminal, operates an extortion racket in the Ramapuram market. During a routine dispute in the market, Achuthan Nair attempts to intervene, but Jose brutally assaults him. Witnessing the events, Sethu intervenes and severely injures Jose and his henchmen. Jose is hospitalized, and the local shopkeepers celebrate his downfall, hailing Sethu as their new protector. Exploiting his fame, Sethu's friends initiate a brawl at a local pub. Deeply troubled by the turn of events, Achuthan Nair accuses Sethu of gradually turning into a criminal. Though Sethu attempts to remain out of conflict, circumstances repeatedly drag him into further trouble.

Hairdrose, an extortionist, joins forces with Sethu's brother-in-law, Ramanan, and begins collecting money from local merchants by falsely claiming to be Sethu's henchman. When Sethu discovers this, he publicly confronts the two men. At home, Ramanan lies about the incident, framing Sethu as the aggressor. Convinced of Sethu's moral decline, Achuthan Nair banishes him from the household. Sethu is subsequently apprehended by the police on minor charges and warned by the local police inspector to avoid further disturbances. When his friend Keshu attempts to comfort him, Sethu breaks down completely.

Meanwhile, Devi's parents forcibly arrange her marriage to another man. Sethu meets Devi, explains his inability to repair his reputation, and advises her to proceed with the marriage. Following her marriage, Sethu grows increasingly isolated. After being discharged from the hospital, Jose seeks vengeance against Sethu and targets anyone who celebrated his defeat. Further, he ransacks Achuthan's home and assaults Sethu's mother and sisters. Later, Jose's lieutenant, Parameshwaran, attacks Sethu. Defending himself, Sethu severely injures him with an iron rod, leaving him hospitalized.

Jose confronts Sethu once more. Driven to state of emotional distress and hysteria, Sethu threatens to kill anyone who approaches him. As a wounded Jose attempts to rise, Sethu stabs him to death. Achuthan arrives at the scene and commands his son to surrender the weapon. Reluctantly, Sethu tosses the dagger aside and falls to his knees in despair. The film concludes with Sethu's disqualification from joining the police force, as Achuthan, now a Head constable, reads a police verification report that classifies his son as "notorious criminal".

== Cast ==
- Mohanlal as Sethumadhavan, an innocent, educated man whose life spirals out of control due to his conflict with Keerikadan Jose.
- Thilakan as Head Constable Achuthan Nair, Sethu's father
- Parvathy as Devi, Sethu's love interest and fiancee
- Kaviyoor Ponnamma as Ammu, Sethu's mother
- Mohan Raj as Keerikadan Jose, tha main antagonist and notorious gangster who torments Sethu and his family.
- Sankaradi as Krishnan Nair, Sethu's maternal uncle and Devi's father
- Sreenath as Keshu, Sethu's friend
- Cochin Haneefa as Haidrose, a thug who is Sethu's friend
- Jagathy Sreekumar as Ramanan, Sethu's brother-in law
- Murali as Lokanathan, Sub-Inspector (SI) of Ramapuram Station
- Philomina as Muthasshi- Krishnan Nair's and Ammu's elderly mother and Sethu's maternal grandmother
- Usha as Latha, Sethumadhavan's younger sister
- Jagadish as Suresh, Sethu's friend
- Maniyanpilla Raju as Najeeb, Sethu's friend
- Mamukkoya as Head Constable Hameed, Najeeb's father
- Oduvil Unnikrishnan as Assistant Sub-inspector (ASI) Gopalakrishnan Nair, Suresh's father
- Kundara Johny as Parameshwaran, the second villain and a thug
- Thikkurissy Sukumaran Nair as a Shop-owner
- Yadu Krishnan as Rameshan, Sethu's youngest brother
- Kanakalatha as Ambika -Sethumadhavan's older sister and Ramanan's wife
- Santhakumari as Bharathi, Krishnan Nair's wife and Devi's mother
- Kollam Thulasi as Sub-Inspector Hari
- Poojappura Radhakrishnan as Shaji, a police constable

== Production ==
=== Development ===
A. K. Lohithadas got the plot idea from a story that circulated in his locality about an incident that happened in Chalakudy that narrates how a carpenter knocked down a notorious criminal named Keshavan with a single hit. Lohithadas, who was unable to attend the wedding of Sibi Malayil, wrote the screenplay of Kireedam as a compensation gift for Malayil. He completed the screenplay in just six days. Filming was completed in 25 days in Thiruvananthapuram. The film cost ₹23.5 lakh to make, produced by Dinesh Panicker and N. Krishnakumar under the company Kripa Films. Kireedam (crown) was originally the title given by Lohithadas for his previous screenplay, directed by I. V. Sasi. But Sasi did not like the name and had a dispute with Lohithadas. Malayil on hearing this incident from Lohithadas said he would like to adopt the title for his film. Sasi's film was released under the title Mukthi (1988).

=== Casting ===
Mohanlal, who used to receive ₹4.5 lakh as remuneration at that time took only ₹4 lakh since he was friends with Krishnakumar. Initially, Thilakan declined the role of Achuthan Nair due to scheduling conflicts with the films Chanakyan (1989) and Varnam (1989). The film, originally planned to shoot at Nemmara and Chittur in Palakkad district was changed to Thiruvananthapuram to accommodate Thilakan who was filming for Varnam at Thiruvananthapuram. Thilakan joined the shoot of Kireedam during the intervals of Varnam.

The makers initially chose Pradeep Shakthi for the role of Keerikkadan Jose, who had acted in Chamaram (1980) and was then an established actor in Telugu films. Shakthi also agreed to do the film and was given advance payment. Shakthi, who was supposed to arrive on the day of filming, did not come due to reasons best known for him, they were compelled to make an immediate replacement. It was an associate director who suggested the name of beginner Mohan Raj, who had acted in a minor role in Moonnam Mura. Upon seeing Raj, he was immediately fixed. His character name Keerikkadan Jose later became his stage name. Dubbing artist Nirmal Prakash gave voice to the character.

=== Filming ===
The climax scene featuring Mohanlal and Thilakan was shot in Aryanadu in Thiruvananthapuram. Instead of the melancholic song "Kanneer Poovinte", a romantic song was originally shot to feature the romance between Sethumadhavan and Devi. But after realizing it would not align in the story-line, it was scrapped. Since there was not enough time to complete the shoot of "Kanneer Poovinte", some of the scenes shot for the romantic song was used in it. The shot where Mohanlal is walking alone through a long lane in the song was filmed at the iconic Vellayani in Thiruvananthapuram. The song's composition was a modified version of the romantic song. S. Kumar was the cinematographer.

The climactic action between Sethumadhavan and Keerikadan Jose in the film was not choreographed by a stunt coordinator nor rehearsed. Sibi Malayil shot it as an impromptu brawl where both Mohanlal and Mohan Raj, improvised blow after blow staying within the framing limits set by two cameras.

== Soundtrack ==
Kireedam

Soundtrack album by Johnson
- Released: 7 July 1989
- Recorded: 1989
- Genre: Feature film soundtrack
- Labels: Johny Sagariga; T-Series; Millennium Audios

Johnson chronology
Mazhavilkavadi (1989)	Kireedam (1989)	Utharam (1989)

The film features original soundtrack composed by Johnson, which consists of two songs written by Kaithapram Damodaran. The song "Kaneer Poovinte" won M. G. Sreekumar his first Kerala State Film Awards.

Kireedam (Original Motion Picture Soundtrack)
No.	Title	Singer(s)	Length
1.	"Kanneer Poovinte"	M. G. Sreekumar	4:14
2.	"Medapponnodam"	Balagopalan Thampi	4:26

== Awards ==
National Film Awards

- National Film Award (Special Mention) – Mohanlal

Kerala State Film Awards

- Kerala State Film Award for Best Male Playback Singer – M. G. Sreekumar

Kerala Film Critics Association Awards

- Kerala Film Critics Award for Best Screenplay – A. K. Lohithadas

== Reception ==
Upon release the film received widespread critical acclaim. In a 1989 reader's poll conduced by Nana Magazine the film was voted the Second Best Film of the year. In a later review, NKS of The Indian Express wrote, "Mohanlal underplays his role as the head constable's son, even as Thilakan playing the cop brings all the experience of his long career to bear on the role". The climactic scene of the film is iconic and is considered one of Mohanlal's greatest onscreen performances. In a 2019 review of the film Fahir Maithutty of The News Minute wrote, "It's effortless how Mohanlal makes us realise the evolution of the character. The climax where he just chews on while waving the knife at police is just another instance of the minute details Mohanlal brings to keep improvising on screen."

== Remakes ==
Year	Film	Language	Ref.
1990	Rowdyism Nasinchali	Telugu	
1991	Modada Mareyalli	Kannada	
1993	Gardish	Hindi	
1995	Babar Adesh	Bangladesh	
2001	Mayusaa	Odia	
2007	Kireedam	Tamil	

== Legacy ==
Kireedam is regarded as a classic in Malayalam cinema, particularly noted for its screenplay and the performances of the lead cast. Mohanlal won his first National Film Award for the film. The dialogue "Ninte achanaada parayunne, kathi thaazhe ideda" of Thilakan's Achuthan Nair in the climax of the film became a catchphrase. The impact of the film was such that Mohan Raj, his character name, Keerikkadan Jose, became his stage name. Kireedam gave a break for Cochin Haneefa who appeared in a comical role, Hydros. Until then, Haneefa was known for portraying antagonistic roles. He began appearing in more comedic roles after Kireedam and would be best known for his comedic roles in the later half of his career.

A bridge on Vellayani Lake featured in the film (including the song "Kanneer Poovinte") would go on to be known as "Kireedam Paalam" (Kireedam bridge). Later many films were shot there, but it continues to be known by the name. It is the only location in Thiruvananthapuram that is known by a film's name. Kireedam, the screenplay was released as a book by Mathrubhumi Books in 2009.
