= The Machine Is Learning =

2020 machine learning book

- Author: Tanuj Solanki
- Genre: Technology
- Publisher: Pan MacMillan
- Publication date: April 2, 2020
- ISBN: 978-93-89109-47-4

The Machine Is Learning is a novel by Indian writer Tanuj Solanki which was published on April 2, 2020, by Pan MacMillan. Its plot concerns the impact of AI on the modern workplace.

== Critical reception ==
Sharanya Manivannan of GQ India wrote "The Machine is Learning is a timely reminder of the stark human cost of tech’s unstoppable march" and Percy Bharucha of Hindustan Times wrote "A novel whose characters are at the heart of the man-versus-machine debate".

The book has been also reviewed by Fehmida Zakeer of The Bangalore Review, Manik Sharma of Firstpost and Mihir Balantrapu of The Hindu.

The book was listed as one of the "Top 10 fiction books of 2020" by The Hindu. The book was longlisted for the 2020 JCB Prize.
