= P. K. Ramachandran Nair =

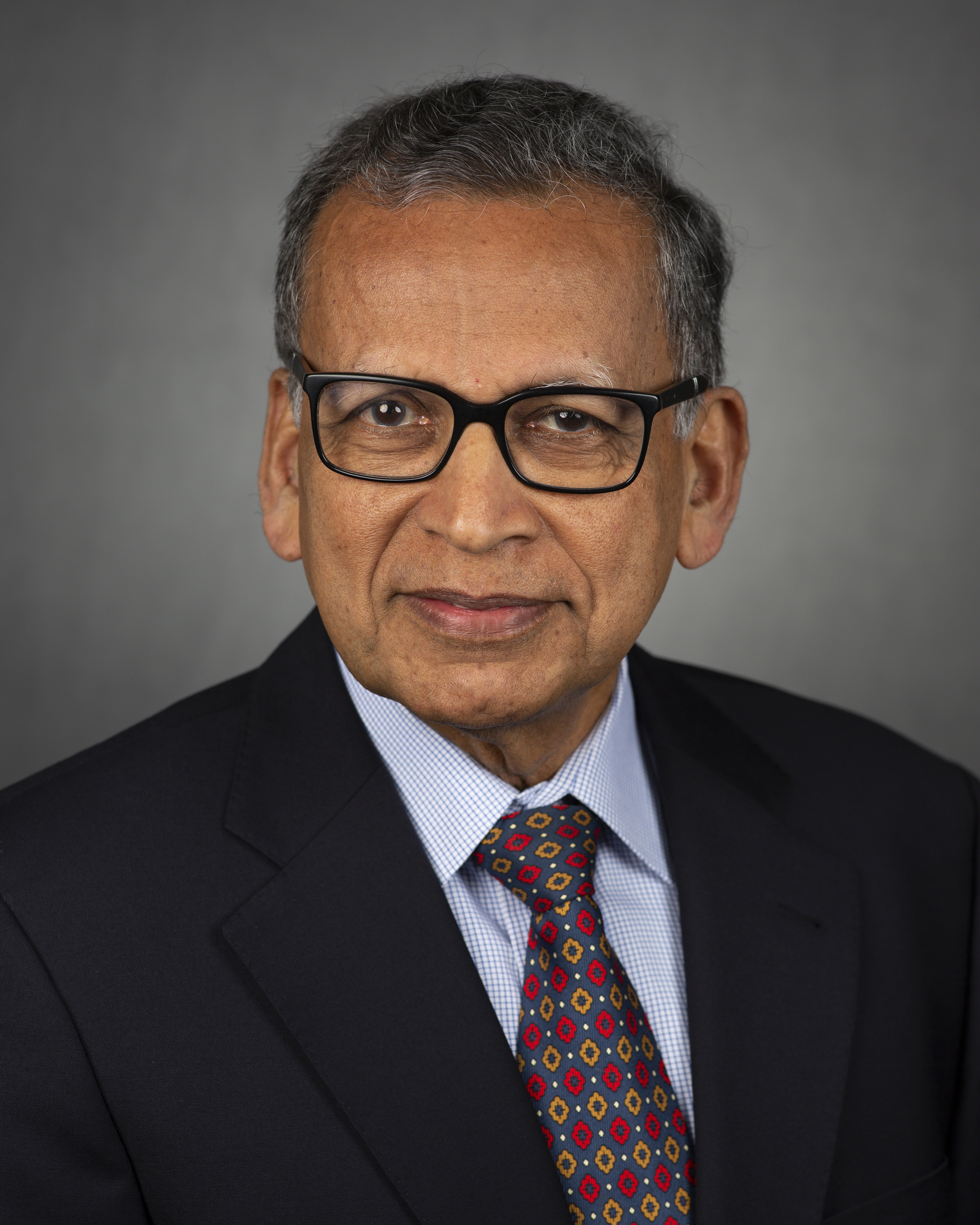
- Born: India
- Awards: Honorary Doctor of Science Degree, Kyoto University (2002); Honorary Doctor of Science Degree, Kwame Nkrumah University of Science and Technology (2005); Humboldt Prize (2006); Honorary Doctor of Science Degree, University of Guelph (2006); Honorary Doctor of Science Degree, University of Santiago de Compostela (2008); Hind Rattan (2010)

Academic background
- Education: B.Sc., Agriculture; M.Sc., Agronomy; Ph.D., Agronomy; Dr. Sc., Tropical Agriculture
- Alma mater: Kerala University; Pantnagar University; Goettingen University

Academic work
- Institutions: University of Florida; ICRAF (World Agroforestry Centre); Central Plantation Crops Research Institute; Rothamsted Experiment Station

P. K. Ramachandran Nair is an Indian American agricultural scientist, Distinguished Professor of Agroforestry and International Forestry at the School of Forest, Fisheries, and Geomatics Sciences (SFFGS), Institute of Food and Agricultural Sciences (IFAS), University of Florida. He is widely recognized as a pioneering figure in the field of agroforestry and is often referred to as the “father of agroforestry.” He received global recognition including the Humboldt Prize (2006). The specific areas of his research include agroforestry in the tropics and subtropics, integrated farming systems, soil carbon sequestration and climate change mitigation, ecosystem services, and soil fertility management. He has written over 200 peer-reviewed articles, 17 books and over 80 book chapters.

Nair is a fellow of the American Association for the Advancement of Science, American Society of Agronomy, Crop Science Society of America, Soil Science Society of America, and the National Academy of Agricultural Sciences, India, He has been awarded honorary doctorate degrees from the Kerala Agricultural University, the University of Santiago de Compostela, Spain; University of Guelph, Canada; Kwame Nkrumah University of Science and Technology, Ghana; and Kyoto University, Japan.

== Early life and education ==
Nair was born and raised in Kerala, India. He received a B.Sc. in Agriculture in 1961 and an M.Sc. in Agronomy in 1968, both from Kerala University. He then received a Ph.D. in Agronomy from Pantnagar University in 1971. He worked as a post-doctoral fellow for a year at the Rothamsted Experimental Station in England.

== Career ==
In 1972, Nair joined the Central Plantation Crops Research Institute of the Indian Council of Agricultural Research (ICAR) at Kasaragod, Kerala, as an Agronomist.[1] In 1976, he moved to Germany as a Senior Humboldt Fellow at Goettingen University; there he received a Doctor of Science degree in Tropical Agriculture.

In 1978, Nair joined ICRAF, the World Agroforestry Centre, a CGIAR institution, which he co-founded, and moved to Nairobi, Kenya, and served as a principal scientist for about 10 years. In 1987, he joined the University of Florida as professor, becoming Distinguished Professor in 2001. At the University of Florida, he initiated the Agroforestry Program. In 2001, he was named a Distinguished Professor.

From 1994 to 2005, Nair was the Editor-in-Chief of Agroforestry Systems. He has also served as the Chief Editor of the Agroecology and Land Use section of the journal Frontiers in Environmental Science as well as on the Editorial Boards of several journals. He created the book series, Advances in Agroforestry in 2004 and has served as its editor for 13 years.

Nair initiated the World Agroforestry Congress series and organized the first one in Florida in 2004. A plenary session at the fourth Congress (2019), in Montpellier, France, was dedicated to him, acknowledging his contributions to the field.

== Research and work ==
In the 1960s, Nair's work was focused on multiple cropping and soil fertility management in the tropics and subtropics. Since the early 1970s, working at the Plantation (tree) Crops Institute in India, he applied the principles of multiple cropping to tree-based systems and developed the multistory cropping system with tree crops, which would later become an example of the sustainable multistrata agroforestry systems of the tropics. He investigated the patterns of light profile and soil-resource utilization in sole stands (monocrop) of coconut plantations in comparison with intercropping systems, which provided a major scientific foundation for the emerging field of agroforestry. His publications during the early 1970s on multiple cropping, 'multi-storeyed cropping’, 'integral agroforestry’ and others, published in international agricultural research and allied journals marked the beginning of his career-long contributions to the development of the subject.

In the 1980s, his research at ICRAF was focused on soil productivity under agroforestry systems. The major areas included decomposition patterns of the foliage from different multipurpose trees used in tropical agroforestry systems, dynamics of soil organic matter and nutrients, and complementarity in nutrient sharing among components of multi-strata systems. This research was conducted in various tropical ecological regions and resulted in numerous publications, including a book: Soil Productivity Aspects of Agroforestry. During the 1980s, Nair also spearheaded a global inventory of agroforestry systems, with financial support of the US-AID and collaboration of numerous institutions in Africa, Asia, and Latin America. The results were published in a book Agroforestry Systems in the Tropics (1989).

In 1993, Nair wrote the book, An Introduction to Agroforestry (publisher: Springer), as a college-level textbook in agroforestry. It has been translated into Spanish, Portuguese, Japanese, and Thai languages.

In the early 2000s, Nair started focusing his research on soil carbon sequestration in agroforestry systems as a strategy for climate-change mitigation, in collaboration with a group of colleagues from different continents. These efforts continued for nearly two decades, and led to recognizing the important role of deep-rooting trees in sequestering carbon in soil, thereby reducing the emission of carbon dioxide to the atmosphere. Understanding the variations in soil carbon sequestration in different soil types depending on the soil characteristics and development of land-use systems to exploit the potential for climate-change mitigation were the other major outputs of this effort. The research has produced more than 20 journal articles, a book, and numerous conference presentations to international gatherings. In addition to carbon sequestration, Nair has also worked on other aspects of ecosystem services of agroforestry systems including biodiversity conservation, soil-degradation control, and water-quality enhancement in soils.

Nair’s work has been recognized as foundational in establishing agroforestry as a modern scientific discipline, helping to systematize and formalize a field that integrates ecological principles with agricultural land-use systems. His conceptual frameworks, experimental studies, and synthesis publications contributed to shaping agroforestry research agendas and academic curricula internationally.

Nair has also had a influence on the training of younger generations of scientists and professionals in agroforestry and related fields. He has supervised graduate students and postdoctoral researchers, organized international training programs, and facilitated professional exchanges across multiple continents, contributing to the global expansion of agroforestry research capacity.

Nair’s scholarly work includes hundreds of peer-reviewed publications and numerous books and edited volumes, and his research contributions have been widely cited in the agroforestry and environmental sciences literature. His work has been recognized by international scientific organizations, and his contributions to agroforestry honored at global scientific gatherings, including dedicated sessions at international congresses. He is frequently described in professional and academic contexts as a leading pioneer of the discipline and referred to as the “Father of Agroforestry,” reflecting the global influence of his research and institutional leadership in the field.

=== Other professional contributions ===
- Editor-in-Chief of Agroforestry Systems (1995 – 2007), Springer Nature
- Section Chief Editor of Agroecology and Land Use Systems (Frontiers in Environmental Sciences); 2012 – 2014
- Inaugural Editor-in-Chief, 2021 – 2023 of the journal Carbon Footprints
- Editor of the book series Advances in Agroforestry (Springer), 2004 – 2017
- Initiator and leader of the World Agroforestry Congress series, held once every five years, starting with the first in Florida in 2004.

== Awards and honors ==
=== Fellow of ===
- American Association for the Advancement of Science, 2001
- American Society of Agronomy, 2000
- Soil Science Society of America, 2001
- Crop Science Society of America, 2007
- National Academy of Agricultural Sciences, India, 2002

=== Honorary (Honoris causa) Doctor of Science Degrees ===
- Kyoto University, Japan: 2002
- Univ of Sci. & Technology, Kumasi, Ghana: 2005
- Univ of Guelph, Ontario, Canada: 2006
- Univ of Santiago de Compostela, Spain: 2008
- Kerala Agricultural University, India: 2023

=== Other Major Awards and Recognitions ===
- 2000 - International Agronomy Award, American Society of Agronomy
- 2001 - International Soil Science Award, Soil Science Society of America
- 2002 - Honorary Doctor of Science Degree, Kyoto University
- 2004 - International Crop Science Award, Crop Science Society of America
- 2004 - Barrington Moore Award, Society of American Foresters
- 2005 - Honorary Doctor of Science Degree, University of Science and Technology
- 2005 - IUFRO (International Union of Forest Research Organizations) Scientific Achievement Award
- 2005 - Fulbright Senior Specialist Award, 2005 – 2010 (Spain: 2006; Malaysia 2007)
- 2006 - Honorary Doctor of Science Degree, University of Guelph
- 2006 - Humboldt Prize
- 2007 - Medal for Global Leadership in Agroforestry, Agriculture University Gazipur, Bangladesh
- 2008 - Honorary Doctor of Science Degree, University of Santiago de Compostela
- 2010 - The Hind Rattan (Jewel of India) Award
- 2014 - Fulbright–Nehru Distinguished Chair Award(2014 – 2015)
- 2014 - Outstanding Research Award, Society of American Foresters
- 2023 - State Science Award, Kerala State Council for Sci. Technology, India

== Publications ==
=== Books authored ===
- Intensive Multiple Cropping with Coconuts in India: Principles, Programmes and Prospects (1979)
- Agroforestry Species – A Crop Sheets Manual (1980)
- Soil Productivity Aspects of Agroforestry (1984)
- An Introduction to Agroforestry (1993)
- Scientific Writing and Communications in Agriculture and Natural Resources (2014) ISBN 978-3-319-03100-2
- An Introduction to Agroforestry, Second Edition (2022), Springer, co-authors: B. M. Kumar, V. D. Nair ISBN 978-3-030-75357-3

=== Books edited ===
- Agroforestry: A Decade of Development (1987)
- Agroforestry Systems in the Tropics (1989)
- Agroforestry Education and Training: Present and Future - Proceedings of an International Workshop (1990)
- Directions in Agroforestry: A Quick Appraisal (1993)
- Directions in Tropical Agroforestry Research. (1998)
- New Vistas in Agroforestry. A compendium for the 1st World Congress of Agroforestry (2004)
- Tropical Homegardens: A Time-Tested Example of Sustainable Agroforestry. Advances in Agroforestry (2006)
- Carbon Sequestration in Agroforestry Systems (2011)
- Agroforestry – The Future of Global Land Use (2012)

=== Books series ===
- Editor of the Book Series (Springer Nature): Advances in Agroforestry; 13 books have been published in the Series during 2004 – 2017.
