= Diwali in Muzaffarnagar =

2018 book by Tanuj Solanki

Diwali in Muzaffarnagar is a collection of short stories by Tanuj Solanki which was published on January 25, 2018 by HarperCollins. The stories are set in Muzaffarnagar in Uttar Pradesh, India.

== Critical reception and reviews ==
Neha Bhatt of Scroll wrote "Tanuj Solanki’s Diwali in Muzaffarnagar features a cast of characters we have met, but do not know." Eram Agha of News18 India wrote "Tanuj Solanki’s award winning book Diwali in Muzaffarnagar is a collection of eight short stories that touch upon a range of issues, including communalism, feminism and child abuse."

The book has been also reviewed by Avantika Mehta of Hindustan Times, Mihir Balantrapu of The Hindu, The Times of India and India Today.

In 2019, Solanki was awarded Yuva Puraskar in English language category for the book.
