= Slaviša Stojanović (footballer, born 1989) =

Serbian footballer

Slaviša Stojanović Славиша Стојановић
Personal information
- Date of birth: 27 January 1989 (age 37)
- Place of birth: Smederevo, SFR Yugoslavia
- Height: 1.79 m (5 ft 10 in)
- Positions: Second striker; attacking midfielder

Team information
- Current team: Loznica
- Number: 70

Senior career*
Years	Team	Apps	(Gls)
2007–2012	Smederevo	77	(9)
2012–2013	Jagodina	18	(0)
2014–2015	Borac Čačak	33	(6)
2015–2016	Radnik Surdulica	29	(9)
2016–2017	Hapoel Kfar Saba	10	(0)
2017	→ Hapoel Petah Tikva (loan)	14	(3)
2017–2018	Radnički Niš	31	(10)
2018–2019	Kerala Blasters	16	(4)
2019	Kerala Blasters (B)	3	(1)
2020	Bačka	13	(0)
2021	Navbahor Namangan	11	(2)
2021–2022	Rad	21	(9)
2022–2025	Inđija	76	(24)
2025	Javor	16	(0)
2025–	Loznica	35	(7)
- * Club domestic league appearances and goals as of 14 May 2026

Slaviša Stojanović (Serbian Cyrillic: Славиша Стојановић; born 27 January 1989) is a Serbian footballer who plays as a forward for Javor.

== Career ==
Stojanović was born in Smederevo in the then former Republic of Yugoslavia and started his football at local club FK Smederevo, where he also made his professional debut. After playing for a number of Serbian and Israeli sides, Stojanović signed for Kerala Blasters ahead of the 2018-19 campaign. In his debut Hero ISL season, he played 16 matches, returning four goals and two assists. He also made 3 appearances for Kerala Blasters 'B'. In 2020 he was signed by Serbian top division club OFK Bačka after the end of hi contract with the Blasters.

== Career statistics ==
=== Kerala Blasters FC ===
Stojanović represented Kerala Blasters FC in the 2018–19 Indian Super League. He played 16 league games and a game in the 2019 Super Cup. He finished his season with 4 goals and an assist to his name.

Season	Super League			Super Cup		AFC Champions League		AFC Cup		Total	
Season	Division	Apps	Goals	Apps	Goals	Apps	Goals	Apps	Goals	Apps	Goals
2018–19	Indian Super League	16	4	1	0	0	0	0	0	17	4
Blasters total		16	4	1	0	0	0	0	0	17	4

As of 22 June 2019

=== Kerala Blasters FC Reserves ===
Stojanović's below average performance at Blasters put him the reserve team of the club, the Kerala Blasters FC (B). He represented the B-team of the club in the Kerala Premier League, a regional state level league in the state of Kerala, that is fourth tier of football in India. He played in the 2018–19 season the league.

Season	Kerala Premier League			Others		Total	
Season	Division	Apps	Goals	Apps	Goals	Apps	Goals
2018-19	Kerala Premier League	3	1	–	–	3	1

As of 22 June 2019

== Honours ==
Jagodina

- Serbian Cup: 2013
