= Anirudh Kanisetti =

Indian historian

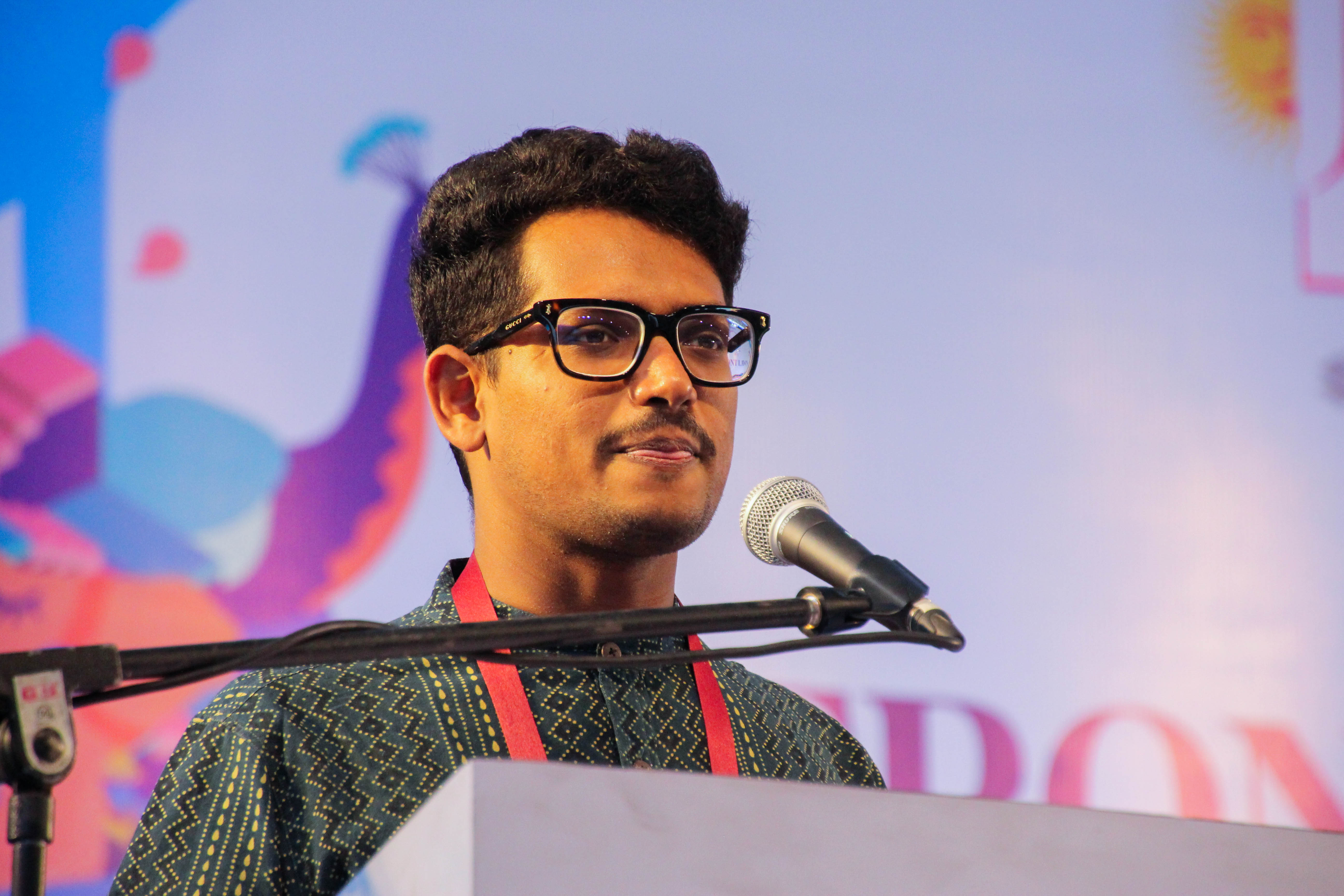
- Education: Bachelor of Engineering
- Alma mater: Birla Institute of Technology and Science, Pilani – Goa Campus
- Occupation: Historian
- Notable work: Lords of the Deccan Lords of Earth and Sea
- Awards: Yuva Puraskar, Tata Literature Live's Non-Fiction Book of the Year Award

Anirudh Kanisetti is an Indian historian. In 2023, the Sahitya Akademi awarded him the Yuva Puraskar for his book Lords of the Deccan: Southern India From Chalukyas To Cholas. In 2022, the book won the Tata Literature Live's Book of the Year Award in the non-fiction category. It is due to be adapted by Rana Daggubati into a web series titled Lord of the Deccan for SonyLIV.

== Education and early career ==
Kanisetti graduated from the Birla Institute of Technology and Science, Pilani – Goa Campus with a Bachelor of Engineering degree with first class honors. He minored in philosophy, economics, and politics.

Kanisetti worked as a geostrategy researcher for the Takshashila Institution after graduation. While at Takshashila, he ran a popular podcast called "Echoes of India."

== Books ==
- India's Marathon: Reshaping the Post-Pandemic World. By Aparna Pande, Constantino Xavier, Manoj Kewalramani, Kunal Singh, Shruti Rajagopalan, James Dorsey, Anirudh Kanisetti, Nitin Pai, Pranay Kotasthane. Publisher: Takshashila Institution. 2020.
- 11 Stops to the Present: Stories of Bengaluru. 2021. By Aditi De, Anirudh Kanisetti, Anitha Murthy, Edgar Demello, Meera Iyer, Menaka Raman, Nagaraj Vastarey, Shruti Rao Sandhya Rao, Shweta Taneja Zac O'Yeah, Sarada Natarajan. Publisher: INTACH Bengaluru Chapter.
- Lords of the Deccan: Southern India From Chalukyas To Cholas. By Anirudh Kanisetti. Publisher: Juggernaut Books. 2022.
- Lords of Earth and Sea. By Anirudh Kanisetti. Publisher: Juggernaut Books. 2025.
