= Vellyani Agricultural College Ground =

Multi purpose stadium in Vellayani, India

Vellayani Agricultural College Ground
- Full name: Vellayani Agricultural College Ground
- Location: Vellayani, Thiruvananthapuram, Kerala
- Owner: Northern Railway
- Operator: Northern Railway
- Capacity: 10,000

Construction
- Groundbreaking: 1963
- Opened: 1963

Website
- Cricinfo

Vellayani Agricultural College Ground is a multi purpose stadium in Vellayani, Thiruvananthapuram, Kerala. The ground is mainly used for organizing matches of football, cricket and other sports.

The stadium has hosted four Ranji Trophy matches from 1990 when Kerala cricket team played against Goa cricket team until 1999.

The stadium has hosted four Ranji Trophy matches from 1990 when Kerala cricket team played against Hyderabad cricket team until 1999 but since then the stadium has hosted non-first-class matches.

The ground has also host an under-19s Test match between India national under-19 cricket team and Australia national under-19 cricket team in March 1994 in future international cricketer like VVS Laxman, Hrishikesh Kanitkar, Pankaj Dhirmani, Pankaj Dharmani, Sridharan Sriram from India and Michael Hussey, Andrew Symonds and Brett Lee from Australia played against each other.
