= Coming Out as Dalit =

2019 autobiography by Yashica Dutt

Coming Out as Dalit: A Memoir of Surviving India's Caste System
- Author: Yashica Dutt
- Language: English
- Subject: Yashica Dutt, Dalit identity, Caste system in India
- Genre: Autobiography, Non-fiction
- Published: 6 February 2019
- Publisher: Aleph Book Company (India), Beacon Press (United States)
- Publication place: India
- Media type: Print
- Pages: 232
- ISBN: 978-0670093021

Coming Out as Dalit is a 2019 autobiography by Indian-American journalist and writer Yashica Dutt. Written in first-person narrative, the book chronicles Dutt’s experiences concealing her Dalit identity to escape caste-based discrimination in India, her eventual public embrace of her identity, and her critique of systemic caste oppression. It also explores her intersecting identities as a Dalit woman and queer individual. Published by Aleph Book Company in India and Beacon Press in the United States, the memoir includes reflections from Dutt’s family and contemporaries. The book was released on 6 February 2019 and received the Sahitya Akademi Yuva Puraskar in 2020.

== Summary ==
The memoir details Yashica Dutt’s life and career. Born in 1986 in Ajmer, Rajasthan, to a Dalit family, Dutt concealed her caste identity to navigate educational and professional spaces. She describes her education at St. Stephen's College, Delhi, and her journalism career in New Delhi and New York City. The book recounts her decision to publicly identify as Dalit in 2016, inspired by the suicide of Rohith Vemula, a Dalit PhD scholar whose death sparked protests. Dutt discusses the psychological toll of hiding her identity and instances of discrimination, emphasizing her resilience. The memoir critiques caste in urban settings and the challenges of writing Dalit narratives in English, raising questions about audience and representation. Its accessible style broadens its reach to diverse readers. Reflections from Dutt’s family and contemporaries provide perspectives on her journey and caste in India.

== Development and release ==
"I wrote this book to speak my truth, to claim my identity, and to challenge the silence around caste in modern India. It’s not just my story—it’s the story of millions of Dalits who navigate a world that refuses to see us as equals."

— Yashica Dutt in an interview with NPR

The idea for Coming Out as Dalit emerged in 2016, when Yashica Dutt began writing about her Dalit identity following Rohith Vemula’s death. Dutt, a journalist with experience at Hindustan Times and The New York Times, proposed a memoir to her editor at Aleph Book Company. The book was compiled from journals, family interviews, and reflections written in New York City and New Delhi between 2016 and 2018, drawing on her personal archives. The title Coming Out as Dalit reflects Dutt’s public declaration of her caste identity. The memoir was published by Aleph Book Company as a hardcover on 6 February 2019, with a U.S. edition released by Beacon Press in 2020.

== Critical reception ==
The memoir was praised for its exploration of caste and identity. Mallika Rao of The Hindu described it as a “compelling narrative” that challenges caste privilege. Christina Thomas Dhanaraj in Scroll.in called it “poignant” but noted its focus on individual struggle. Antara Sharma of Outlook India labelled it “a powerful testament to resilience.” Sujatha Gidla in The Caravan commended it as “an eye-opening contribution to Dalit literature.” G. Sampath in The Hindu Business Line praised its accessibility. Kamala Thiagarajan of NPR noted its resonance with diaspora communities. Rajiv Thind in Frontline highlighted its contribution to English-language Dalit literature. Ankita Apurva in The Wire suggested more focus on systemic issues.

== Controversy ==
In 2023, the memoir’s title sparked debate, with critics arguing that “Coming Out” appropriates queer terminology. A letter to the publishers, reported by The Print, requested a title review for future editions, citing concerns about intersectional sensitivity.
