= Yashica Dutt =

Indian writer and journalist

- Born: Yashica Dutt Nidaniya; Ajmer, Rajasthan, India
- Education: St. Stephen's College, Delhi (BSc); Columbia University Graduate School of Journalism (M.A.)
- Occupations: Author; Journalist
- Years active: 2005–present
- Notable work: Coming Out as Dalit
- Website: yashicadutt.com

Yashica Dutt Nidaniya (born 5 February) is an Indian writer and freelance journalist who has written on topics including fashion, gender, identity, culture and caste. Following the response to her 2016 blog post, 'Today, I’m coming out as Dalit', Dutt published "Documents of Dalit Discrimination" on Tumblr and the book Coming Out as Dalit, which received a Sahitya Akademi award.

== Early life and education ==
Dutt was born in a Valmiki Hindu family in Ajmer, Rajasthan on 5 February. She completed her graduation in B.Sc. from St. Stephen's College, Delhi in 2007. Dutt completed her master's degree in arts and culture journalism from Columbia University Graduate School of Journalism in 2015.

== Career ==
In 2016, Dutt authored a blog post titled 'Today, I’m coming out as Dalit' describing how she had hidden her caste and passed as ‘non-Dalit’. Following her post Dutt began receiving messages from other Dalit women who shared similar experiences, prompting her to create the Tumblr blog "Documents of Dalit Discrimination" as a platform to publish some of their stories.

Dutt's journalism and commentary has been published in Indian and international publications including The Atlantic, The New York Times, The Caravan, Foreign Policy, Hindustan Times, LiveMint, Scroll.in, The Wire, HuffPost India and The Asian Age. She was a Principal Correspondent with Brunch, the Sunday Magazine of the Hindustan Times.

== Book ==
Coming Out as Dalit is Yashica's book published by Aleph Book Company. It is her memoir about growing up in a Dalit family. In the book, she describes how she felt compelled to hide her caste and pretended to be of another caste, all along terrified of her true identity being found out. Her decision to end the pretense of being an upper caste woman was triggered by a University of Hyderabad Dalit student Rohith Vemula's last letter, which was made public following his suicide. The book details her journey of coming to terms with her true identity. The book is a social commentary woven with personal experiences. She received the Sahitya Akademi Yuva Puraskar for the book in the English category for the year 2020.
