= Devapriya Roy =

Indian author

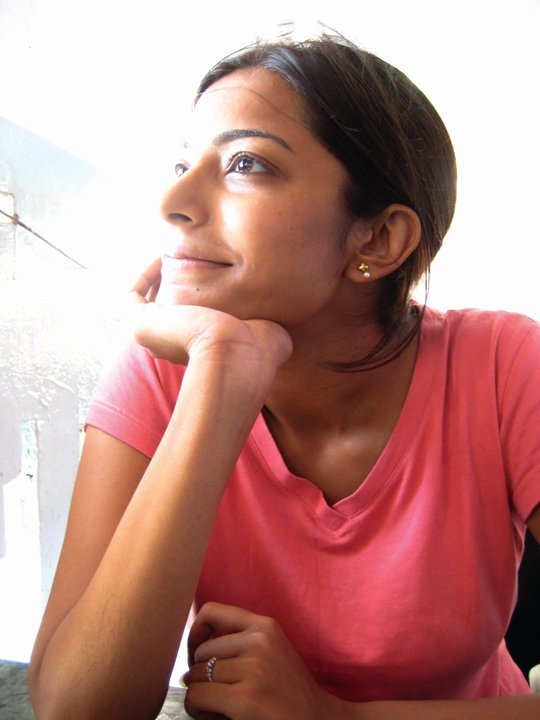
- Born: 24 May; Kolkata
- Occupation: Author
- Spouse: Saurav Jha

Devapriya Roy is an Indian author best known for her books, Friends from College, Indira and The Heat and Dust Project. She lives in New Delhi with her husband Saurav Jha.

== Early life and education ==
Roy was born in Calcutta and studied in Calcutta Girl's High School.

She earned her bachelor's degree and master's degree in English literature from Presidency College and Jawaharlal Nehru University respectively. She obtained a PhD on Bharata’s Natyashastra from Jawaharlal Nehru University under the supervision of award-winning poet and playwright H.S. Shivaprakash, and her co-supervisor was Prof Katia Legeret of the University of Paris VIII.

== Career ==
Roy began her career with The Vague Woman’s Handbook, a quirky novel that was published by HarperCollins in March 2011 and subsequently appeared on the India Today Bestseller List.

Her second book was The Weight Loss Club: The Curious Experiments of Nancy Housing Cooperative, yet another quirky novel published by Rupa & Co. in July 2013.

Her 2015 book, The Heat and Dust Project (written along with husband Saurav Jha) chronicles the story of travelling through India on local buses "on a very very tight budget" which debuted at no.1 on the Hindustan Times-AC Nielsen list and also got excellent reviews. The Heat and Dust Project is also a first-of-its-kind dynamic book as the couple used Facebook to document their journey even as it was underway.

A teaser for the sequel of The Heat and Dust Project, called Man. Woman. Road., was published in Indian Express recently.

In 2017, Roy authored a graphic biography of Indira Gandhi, Indira, with artist Priya Kuriyan – a unique book about a young student, Indira Thapa (named after Indira Gandhi), who is set an unusual assignment by her favourite teacher: to write an essay around her name. The book, published by Westland's imprint, Contxt, alternates between chapters of fictional prose and graphic biography.

In June 2018, she started the publication of a serialised novel, The Romantics of College Street, in The Telegraph India. It was then consolidated as a book, and published by Westland under the title Friends from College a year later. A love letter to College Street in Calcutta, it follows various characters returning to Calcutta more than twenty years after college.
