= The Ivory Throne =

2016 history book

The Ivory Throne: Chronicles of the House of Travancore
- Author: Manu S. Pillai
- Language: English, Malayalam (Danthasimhasanam: The Chronicles of The House of Travancore)
- Genre: History/Biography
- Publisher: HarperCollins, India
- Publication date: 2016
- Publication place: India
- Media type: Print (paperback)

The Ivory Throne: Chronicles of the House of Travancore is a 2016 nonfiction historical book by Indian writer Manu S. Pillai. It covers the journey of Sethu Lakshmi Bayi, during her reign in the house of Travancore. The book came into the hands of Shobu Yarlagadda, producer of the Baahubali franchise, and optioned the rights under Arka Media Works, a noted Indian motion-picture production company.

== Synopsis ==
The book begins by discussing the cultural implications of the arrival of Portuguese explorer Vasco da Gama and the expansion of maritime trade in the Indian subcontinent. It specifically focuses on the series of events that lead to the rise of Marthanda Varma and his impact on the Kingdom of Travancore. During that era, the kingdom followed a form of matrilineal succession known as Marumakkathayam and it was through this system that the adoption of Sethu Lakshmi Bayi and her cousin Sethu Parvathi Bayi into the Travancore Royal Family (depicted on the cover of the book) made them the Senior Maharani and Junior Maharani, respectively.

The book covers most key events in Travancore's history from the perspective of the Senior Maharani, often involving the Junior Maharani to various degrees. It chronicles the bond they shared during their upbringing, which would later turn into a power struggle when Senior Maharani begins her regency during the minority of the Junior Maharani's son (and heir to the eponymous Ivory Throne), Chithira Thirunal Balarama Varma. While the Maharani's regency would be marked largely with positive reforms for both the people and the Kingdom of Travancore, the termination of her regency would be the beginning of a bitter struggle between her and the Junior Maharani.

The continued struggles between the two Maharanis also overlapped with the Indian Independence movement, the rise of Communism in Kerala and the dismantling of the monarchy during the formation of the Dominion of India. The book also shows how the Maharani's children (and later the Maharani herself) adapted to becoming civilians, and the later years of her life spent in Bangalore.

== Reception ==
While the book itself won awards including the Sahitya Akademi Yuva Puraskar, its rising popularity has garnered interest in a screen adaptation. Later a Malayalam version Danthasimhasanam: The Chronicles of The House of Travancore translated by Prasanna K. Verma was released.

Aswathi Thirunal Gowri Lakshmi Bayi of Travancore Royal family claimed that the book is not true to the facts in a video interview.
