= Manu S. Pillai =

Indian author and historian (born 28th February 1990)

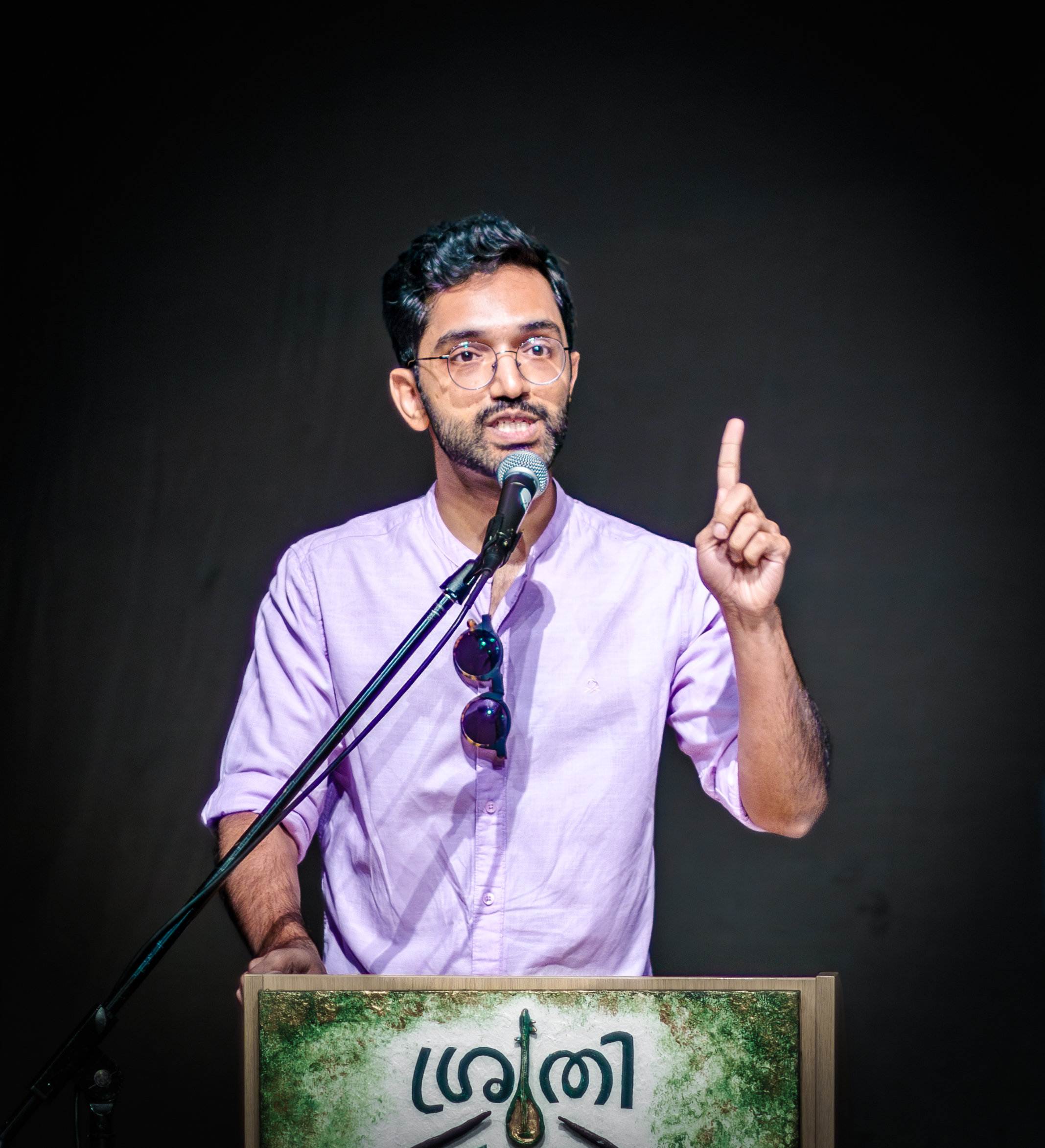
- Pillai in 2025
- Born: 28 February 1990 (age 36); Mavelikkara, Kerala, India
- Education: Fergusson College; King's College London
- Occupations: Writer, historian
- Writing career
- Language: English
- Genre: Popular history
- Website: manuspillai.com

Manu S. Pillai (born 28th February 1990) is an Indian writer and popular historian. He is known for his works covering the history of India from late medieval through colonial times, with his debut book, The Ivory Throne, winning the Sahitya Akademi Yuva Puraskar.

== Early life and education ==
Manu S. Pillai was born in Mavelikkara, Kerala, in 1990, and grew up in Pune, Maharashtra. He received a bachelor's degree in economics from Fergusson College and a master's degree in international relations from King's College London. He holds a PhD in history (with a dissertation titled Rajas, Rani, Deity and Company) from King's College London.

== Career ==
Following his education, he worked with the parliamentary office of Shashi Tharoor in New Delhi and with Karan Bilimoria in London. He also worked as a researcher on the BBC Radio 4 series Incarnations with Sunil Khilnani, which tells the story of India through fifty great lives. In 2017, he became a full time author.

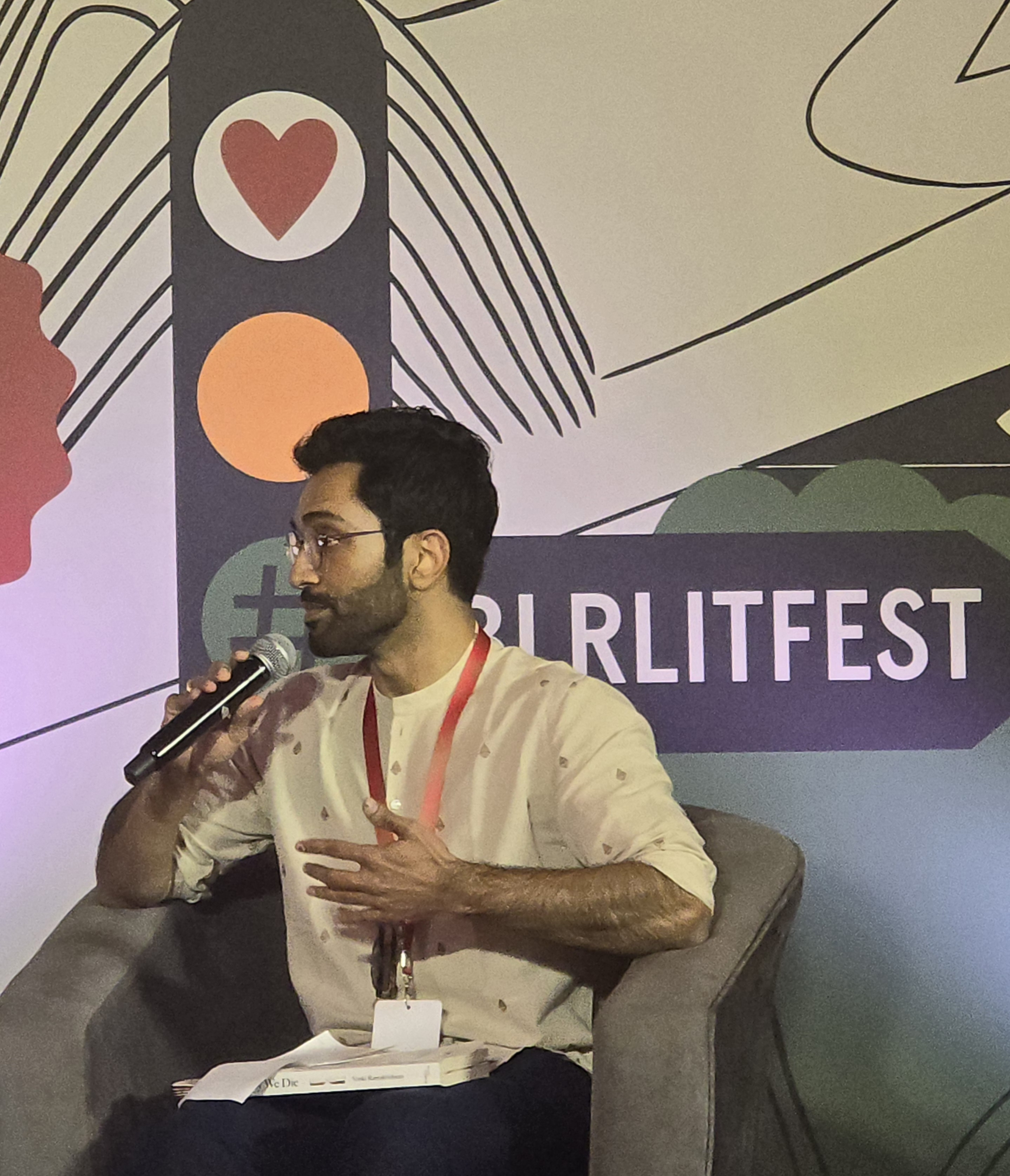
Manu S Pillai at BlrLitFest 2024

Pillai's debut book The Ivory Throne: Chronicles of the House of Travancore, about Rani Sethu Lakshmi Bhay's reign as the regent of Travancore, earned him the Sahitya Akademi Yuva Puraskar in 2017. As of 2019, the story was expected to be adapted into a web series by Arka Media Works.

Rebel Sultans, Pillai's second work, narrates the story of the late medieval Deccan Plateau over four centuries. The Courtesan, the Mahatma and the Italian Brahmin is a collection released in 2019 consisting of historical anecdotes originally published as columns in various Indian newspapers.

Pillai's 2021 book False Allies concerns the rulers of princely states during the British Raj, focusing on five states whose rulers patronized and were painted by Raja Ravi Varma. In Gods, Guns and Missionaries, first released in India in 2024, Pillai outlines the history of Hinduism during India's colonization by Christian European states.

== Bibliography ==
- The Ivory Throne: Chronicles of the House of Travancore. HarperCollins India, 2015. ISBN 9789351776420.
- Rebel Sultans: The Deccan from Khilji to Shivaji. Juggernaut, 2018. ISBN 9789386228734.
- The Courtesan, the Mahatma & the Italian Brahmin: Tales from Indian History. Illustrated by Priya Kuriyan. Context, 2019. ISBN 9789388689786.
- False Allies: India's Maharajahs in the Age of Ravi Varma. Juggernaut, 2021. ISBN 9789391165895.
- Gods, Guns and Missionaries: The Making of the Modern Hindu Identity. Penguin Allen Lane, 2024. ISBN 9780670093656.
