= Mihir Vatsa =

Indian poet and writer

- Born: Mihir Kumar Jha
- Education: Ramjas College, University of Delhi
- Occupations: Poet, writer
- Notable work: Tales of Hazaribagh: An Intimate Exploration of Chhotanagpur Plateau
- Awards: Sahitya Akademi Yuva Puraskar (2022); Charles Wallace Fellowship (2015); Toto Funds the Arts Award (2014); Srinivas Rayaprol Poetry Prize (2013)

Mihir Kumar Jha, better known by his adopted pseudonym "Mihir Vatsa", is an Indian poet and writer. He won the Sahitya Akademi Yuva Puraskar in 2022 for his travel memoir Tales of Hazaribagh: An Intimate Exploration of Chhotanagpur Plateau. After Hansda Sowvendra Shekhar and Anuj Lugun (Baagh Aur Sugna Munda Ki Beti, 2019), he is the third writer from Jharkhand to win the Yuva Puraskar award in English language. Tales of Hazaribagh received critical acclaim upon publication and was ranked among the top non-fiction books in 2021.

== Life and education ==
Vatsa is an alumnus of DAV Public School, Canary Hill Road, Hazaribag. He obtained his bachelor's and master's degrees in English literature from Ramjas College, University of Delhi, and is presently a doctoral fellow at the Indian Institute of Technology, New Delhi.

== Literary career ==
Vatsa published his first poetry collection Painting That Red Circle White in 2014. A poetry chapbook Wingman followed in 2017 as part of a limited-edition, collaborative project FIVE, which also included chapbooks by poets Arjun Rajendran, Nandini Dhar, Usha Akella and Manjiri Indurkar. He has contributed poems to various Indian and international literary magazines, including The Island Review (UK), Eclectica (US), Stand (University of Leeds, UK), Softblow (Singapore), Rattle (US) and Poetry at Sangam (India), among others. His poems have been anthologized in Eclectica Magazine Best Poetry (Eclectica, 2016), 40 Under 40: An Anthology of Post-Globalisation Poetry (Paperwall, 2016), A Map Called Home (Kitaab, 2018) and Witness: The Red River Book of Poetry of Dissent (Red River, 2021).

In 2013, he was conferred with the Srinivas Rayaprol Poetry Prize, administered jointly by the Srinivas Rayaprol Literary Trust and the Department of English, University of Hyderabad. In 2014, he received a Toto Funds the Arts award for Writing in English. In 2015, Vatsa was awarded the Charles Wallace Writing Fellowship at the University of Stirling, UK. At the age of 23, he became the youngest Charles Wallace Fellow in the history of the fellowship.

== Bibliography ==
- 2021: Tales of Hazaribagh: An Intimate Exploration of Chhotanagpur Plateau (Non-fiction)
- 2017: Wingman (Poetry)
- 2014: Painting That Red Circle White (Poetry)

== Awards and recognition ==
- 2022: Sahitya Akademi Yuva Puraskar
- 2015: Charles Wallace Fellowship
- 2014: Toto Funds Arts Award
- 2013: Srinivas Rayaprol Poetry Prize
