= Vellayani =

- village
- Location in Kerala, India Vellayani (India)
- Coordinates: 8°26′44″N 76°59′33″E
- Country: India
- State: Kerala
- District: Thiruvananthapuram

Government
  - Body: Gram panchayat

Languages
  - Official: Malayalam, English
- Time zone: UTC+5:30 (IST)
- Telephone code: 0471
- Vehicle registration: KL-01, KL-
- Coastline: 0 kilometres (0 mi)
- Nearest city: Thiruvananthapuram
- Climate: Tropical monsoon (Köppen)
- Avg. summer temperature: 35 °C (95 °F)
- Avg. winter temperature: 20 °C (68 °F)

Vellayani is a suburb of Thiruvananthapuram, the capital city of Kerala, India.

== Location ==
Vellayani is reached via Thiruvananthapuram Central Bus Station at Thampanoor (9 km) and from City Bus Depot at East Fort. It is connected by state road transport and private buses. The nearest airport is Thiruvananthapuram International Airport.

== Tourism ==
Vellayani is on the banks of Vellayani Lake, the only fresh water lake in Thiruvananthapuram district. Illegal sand mining, pollution and land reclamation are taking its toll on the lake.

A 700-year-old temple, dedicated to Goddess Kali is an attraction at Vellayani, Vellayani Devi Temple. The temple celebrates the longest (50 days) non-pilgrimage festival of South India. This festival is held once in three years and is known as the ‘Kaliyoottu Mahotsavam’ – which means ‘the festival of feeding the Devi’.

== Trivia ==
College of Agriculture, Vellayani, the first agricultural college of Kerala is situated here.
