= Vellayani Lake =

Lake in Kerala, India

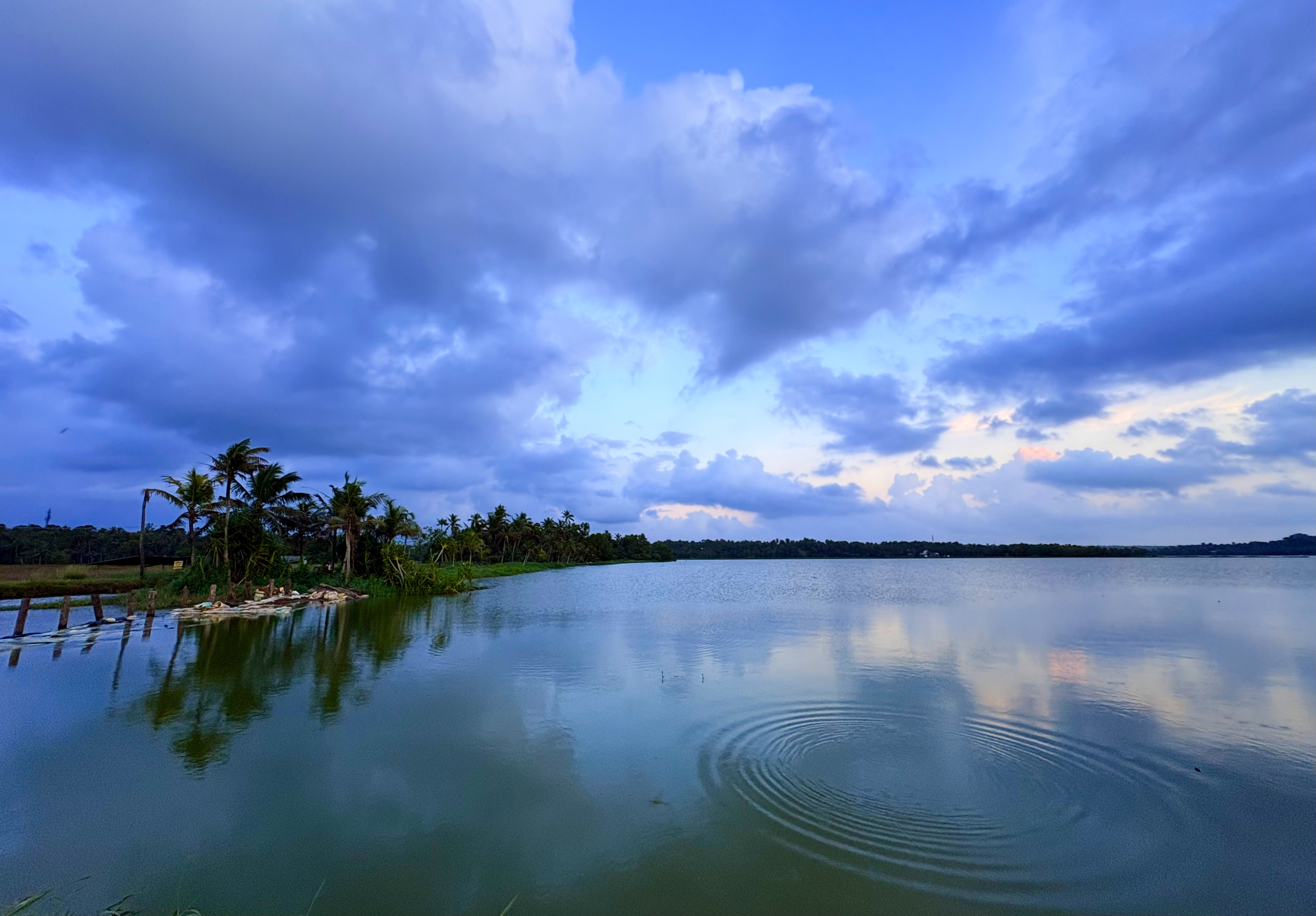

- Location within Kerala
- Location: Thiruvananthapuram district, Kerala
- Coordinates: 8°25′57.45″N 76°59′37.8″E
- Basin countries: India
- Settlements: Thiruvananthapuram

Vellayani Lake, or Vellayani Kayal, is the second largest freshwater lake in the state of Kerala and is situated in Thiruvananthapuram, Kerala, India. Vellayani is known for its lotus blooms and is considered a little eco-haven. In ancient times, boats laden with goods used to navigate the Vellayani backwaters up to Chala.

== Location ==
It is around 9 km away from the Thiruvananthapuram Central Bus Station in Thampanoor. Buses ply to Vellayani Lake from City Depot at East Fort as well. It is at a distance of 7 km from Kovalam via the Poonkulam Junction.

== Attractions ==
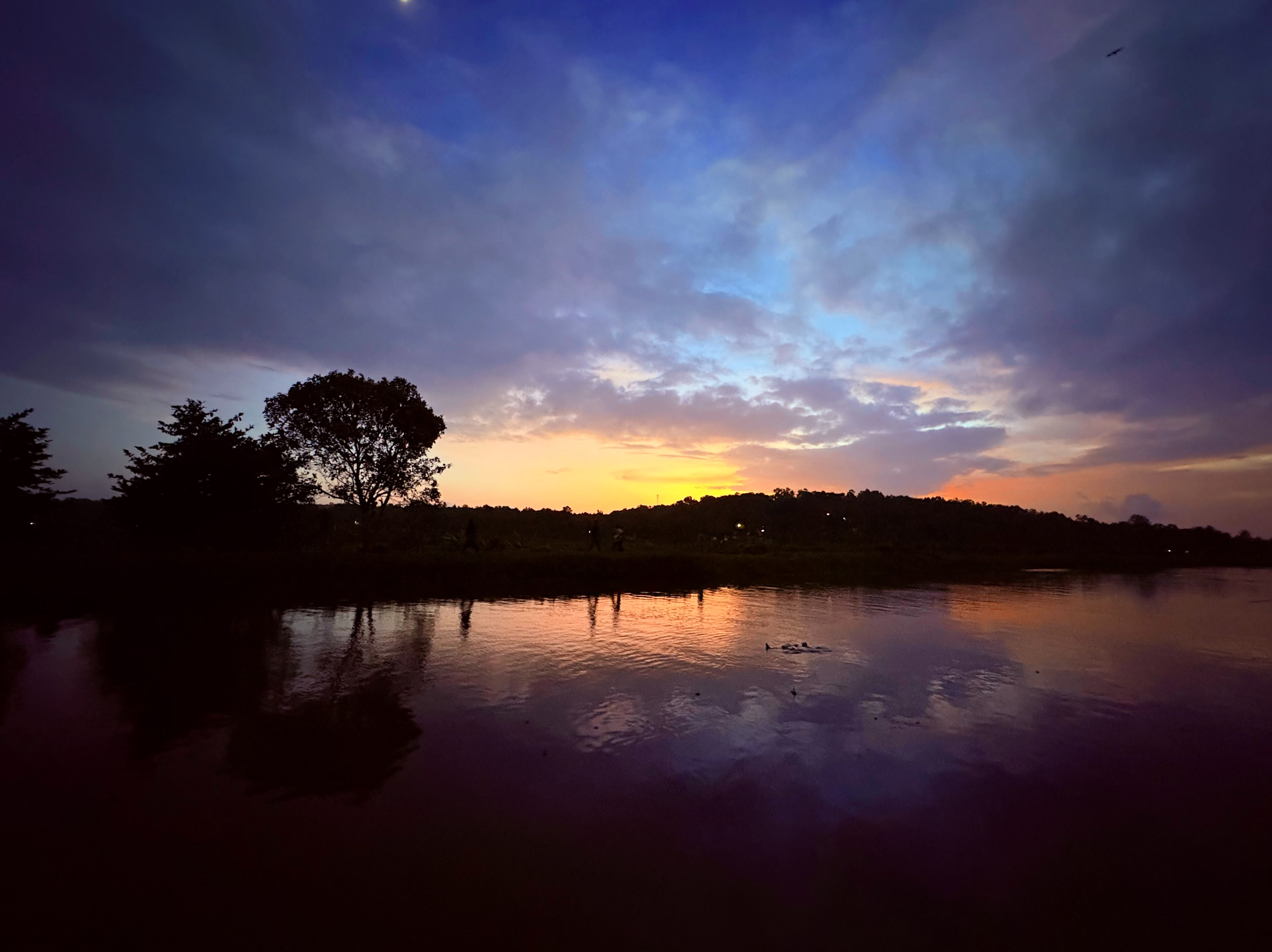
Evening view from Vellayani lake

College of Agriculture, Vellayani, also called Lalindloch Palace, is located on the western shores of Vellayani Lake.

The Kaliyut Maholsavam, a grand celebration held once every three years for a duration of 50 days, is a cultural event held at the place.

The Ayyankali boat race is held every year at the Vellayani lake in the remembrance of social reformer Ayyankali.

== Reduction in the area of lake ==
A geospatial study by GIS experts Vinod P. G., S. Nalinakumar, S. R. Sreeraj, Adarsh Pratap, and Mohan Pillai found that there has been a considerable reduction in the area of Vellayani Lake from 1979 to 2019. In 1973, it was 558.93 hectares; it was reduced to 267.89 hectares in 1992, and then to 267.14 hectares in 2011 and to 222 hectares in 2019.

== Threats to the lake and biodiversity ==
The Vellayani-Punchakkari wetlands have always been a paradise for birdwatchers with various species of migratory birds that includes Glossy ibis, spot-billed pelican, painted stork and Pacific swallow flocking to the region but, over the years, their number has dwindled. The number of migratory birds arriving every year has decreased in recent years as a result of plastic pollution and habitat loss.

There was a move to drain the lake and use the reclaimed area for agriculture. It was resisted by locals and environmentalists and has been shelved. Illegal sand mining, pollution and land reclamation is affecting the condition of the lake.

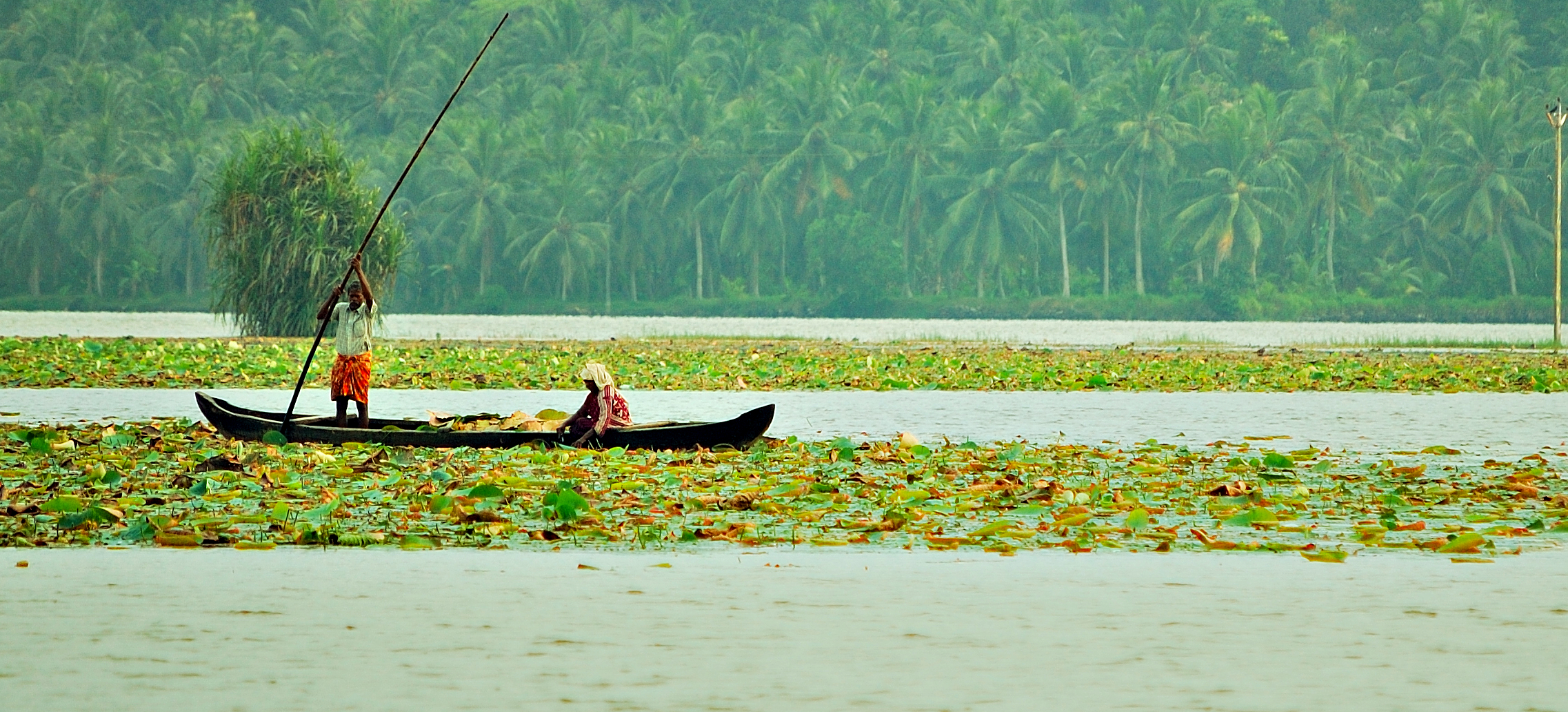
Harvesting lotus leaves

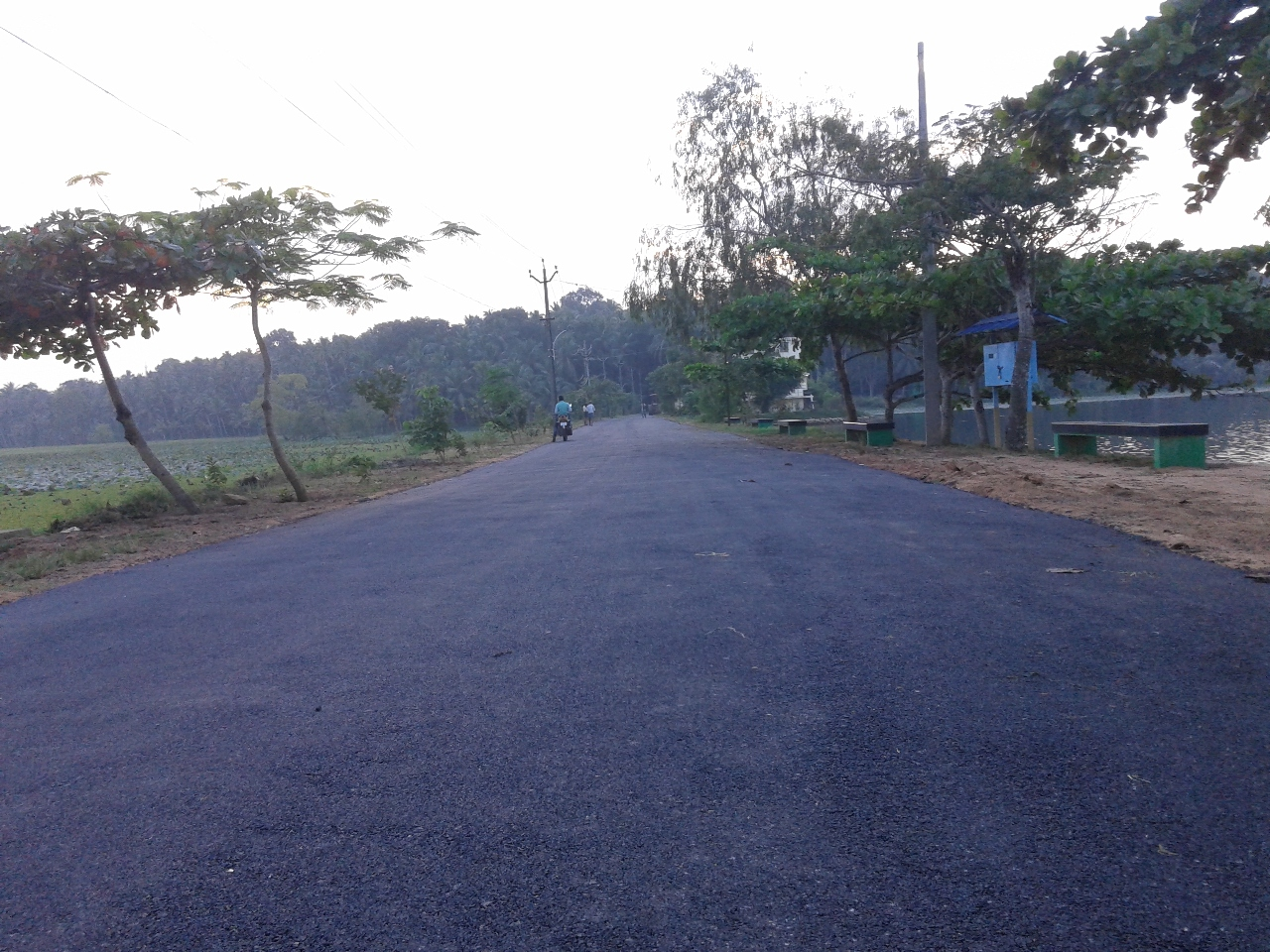
Vavvamoola Lake road

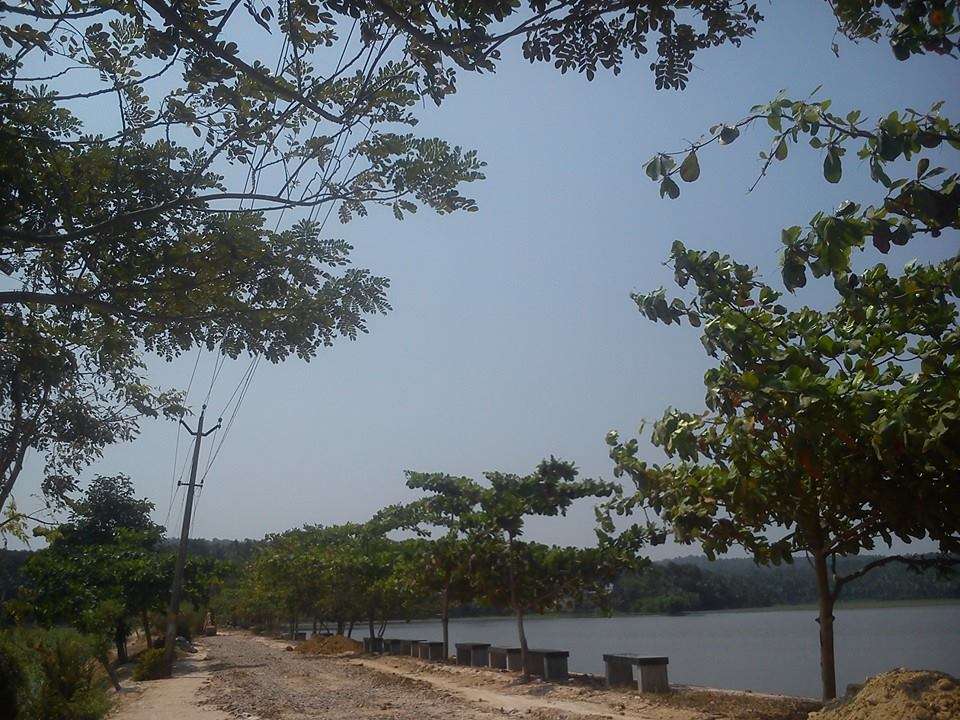
Vavvamoola Lake road before tarring with concrete benches in the background

== Vavvamoola-Kadavinmoola Bund Road ==
The bund road on the northern side of Kakkamoola-Thiruvananthapuram Road connects Vavvamoola and Kadavinmoola. The drinking water supply for the Vizhinjam International Seaport is operated from Vellayani Lake. The pump house is situated in Kadavinmoola, beside the bund road. The road was renovated in December 2015 and has concrete benches on the roadside to attract tourists.

== Popular culture ==
A bridge on Vellayani Lake, which was featured in the film Kireedam (1989) became known as Kireedam Paalam.
