= 2021–22 Kerala Premier League =

9th season of Kerala Premier League

Kerala Premier League
- Season: 2021–22
- Dates: 3 November 2021 – 10 April 2022
- Champions: Golden Threads (1st title)
- Matches: 110
- Goals: 196 (1.78 per match)
- Top goalscorer: Nuhu Seidu (12)
- Biggest win: Real Malabar FC 0-7 Sports Academy Tirur
- Highest scoring: KSEB 7-1 MA College
- Longest unbeaten run: Kerala Police; BASCO FC (10 matches)
- Longest winless run: Kerala Blasters B (6 matches)
- Longest losing run: Kerala Blasters B (6 matches)

The 2021–22 Kerala Premier League was the ninth season of the Kerala Premier League. The season featured 24 teams and was played in multiple venues. This season, the Kerala Football Association decided to add 12 more participants to the league.

== Qualifiers ==
=== Teams ===
	Team	Head coach	Captain	Ground	City	Sponsor
1	AIFA	(India) Deepak Cherukudi Mattuvayil	(India) Mohammed Shamnas T	AIFA Ground, Koppam	Koppam	Aerius
2	CALICO KFTC	(India) KP Sethumadhavan	(India) Shibin K	St. Joseph's College Ground	Calicut	
3	Kochi City FC	(India) Jestes Antony	(Ivory Coast) Bertie Bridji Anderson	Municipal Stadium, Aluva	Aluva, Kochi	Federal Bank
4	Lords	(India) Sreekumar MP	(India) Abhilash		Kochi	
5	United FC Cochin	(India) Naresh Narayan Virnodkar	(India) Anandhu S		Kochi	
6	Universal Soccer Club	(India) Haris Kadalnath	(India) Fahad C	Calicut Medical College Stadium	Calicut	Capstone

=== Foreign players ===
	Team	Player 1	Player 2	Player 3
1	AIFA			
2	CALICO KFTC			
3	Kochi City FC	(Ivory Coast) Bertie Bridji Anderson	(Ivory Coast) Alassane Junior Sagara	(Ivory Coast) Kilane Ebenezer Diamande
4	Lords			
5	United FC Cochin			
6	Universal Soccer Club	(Cameroon) Ekoule Eugene	(Cameroon) Djougo Foku Mike	

=== Group A ===
Pos	Team	Pld	W	D	L	GF	GA	GD	Pts	
1	Kochi City FC	2	1	1	0	5	3	+2	4	Advance to the final round
2	Universal Calicut SC	2	1	1	0	5	3	+2	4	
3	United FC Cochin	2	0	0	2	2	6	−4	0	

=== Fixtures ===
Cancelled matches

3 November 2021	United FC Cochin	1-3	Universal SC	Koppam
15:00 IST	Anandhu 14'		Ekoule 14'; Fahad 48'; Ratobe 82'	Stadium: Altius International Football Academy Ground

6 November 2021	Kochi City FC	3-1	United FC Cochin	Koppam
15:00 IST	Vigneshwaran 29'; Alassane 73'; Badusha 90'		Clincent 5'	Stadium: Altius International Football Academy Ground

9 November 2021	Kochi City FC	2-2	Universal SC	Koppam
15:00 IST	Vigneshwaran 17'; Anderson 66'		Ekoule 49'; Mike 90+1'	Stadium: Altius International Football Academy Ground

=== Group B ===
Pos	Team	Pld	W	D	L	GF	GA	GD	Pts	
1	AIFA FC	2	2	0	0	5	0	+5	6	Advance to the final round
2	Lords FA	2	1	0	1	0	3	−3	3	
3	KFTC	2	0	0	2	0	2	−2	0	

=== Fixtures ===
Cancelled matches

4 November 2021	AIFA	2-0	KFTC	Koppam
15:00 IST	Jasbeer 41'; Hashif 79'			Stadium: Altius International Football Academy Ground

7 November 2021	Lords FA	0-3	AIFA	Koppam
15:00 IST			Hashif 45+2'; Shamnas 54'; Jasbeer 90+4'	Stadium: Altius International Football Academy Ground

10 November 2021	KFTC	0-1	Lords FA	Koppam
15:00 IST			Aslam Ali 21'	Stadium: Altius International Football Academy Ground

=== Finals ===
	Kochi City FC	0-2	AIFA	Koppam
15:00 IST			Sarath 23'; Jasbeer 45+6'	Stadium: Altius International Football Academy Ground

== Teams ==
Locations of the 2020–21 Kerala Premier League teams

Ernakulam KPL teams

Stadium	Capacity	Location
EMS Stadium	80,000	Calicut
Thrissur Municipal Corporation Stadium	20,000	Thrissur
Maharaja's College Ground	20,000	Kochi

	Entry type	Team	Head coach	City	Sponsor
1	2020–21 KPL teams	BASCO FC	(India) E Shivamani	Malappuram	Janatha TMT
2	2020–21 KPL teams	FC Kerala	(India) Asis Kunjivapu	Thrissur	Yogakshemam Loans
3	2020–21 KPL teams	Gokulam Kerala FC B	(India) Rajeev Ponnanthari	Kozhikode	Gokulam Group
4	2020–21 KPL teams	Golden Threads FC	(India) Soly Xavier	Kochi	Wayna Water
5	2020–21 KPL teams	Kerala Blasters B	(Poland) Tomasz Tchórz	Kochi	Byju's
6	2020–21 KPL teams	Kerala United FC	(India) Bino George	Manjeri	Micro Health Laboratories
7	2020–21 KPL teams	Kerala Police	(India) I. M. Vijayan	Malappuram	Odyssia
8	2020–21 KPL teams	Kovalam Football Club	(India) Ebin Rose	Kovalam	Federal Bank
9	2020–21 KPL teams	KSEB	(India) P B Ramesh	Trivandrum	MADRE Integrated Engineering
10	2020–21 KPL teams	Luca Soccer Club	(India) Torben Witajewski	Manjeri	Abreco Freight
11	2020–21 KPL teams	MA College	(India) Rajeev Palickal	Kothamangalam	Positive
12	2020–21 KPL teams	SA Tirur	(India) Sunil Kumar	Tirur	AB Bismi
13	Corporate entry	Muthoot FA	(India) K Anees	Kochi	Muthoot Pappachan Group
14	Corporate entry	Don Bosco FA	(India) Alphonse Jose	Kochi	
15	Corporate entry	Little Flower FA	(India) Cleofas Alex	Trivandrum	Odyssia
16	Corporate entry	Travancore Royals FC	(India) Samuel Geevarghese	Trivandrum	Vismayasmax Animations
17	Corporate entry	FC Areekode	(India) Mohammed Ashiq	Areekode	
18	Corporate entry	Real Malabar FC	(India) Vinu Jose	Kondotty	EDEX
19	Corporate entry	Wayanad United FC	(India) Sanush Raj	Kalpetta	Wagonmart
20	Corporate entry	Parappur FC	(India) Sanjoy Kumar Dey	Parappur	South Indian Bank
21	Corporate entry	SAI Kollam	(India) Deepak Boro	Kollam	
22	Qualifier winners	Altius IFA	(India) Deepak Cherukudi Mattuvayil	Koppam	Aerius

=== Number of teams by region ===
No. of teams	Districts	Team(s)
7	Malappuram	BASCO FC, Kerala United FC, Kerala Police, Luca Soccer Club, FC Areekode,Real Malabar FC and SA Tirur
5	Ernakulam	Golden Threads FC, Kerala Blasters, MA College, Muthoot FA, and Don Bosco FA
4	Trivandrum	Kovalam Football Club, KSEB, Little Flower FA, and Travancore Royals FC
2	Thrissur	FC Kerala and Parappur FC
1	Kozhikode	Gokulam Kerala FC B
1	Wayanad	Wayanad United FC
1	Palakkad	Altius IFA
1	Kollam	SAI Kollam

== Foreign players ==
	Team	Player 1	Player 2	Player 3	Player 4
1	Altius IFA				
2	BASCO FC	(Cameroon) Djougo Foku Mike	(Cameroon) Jacque Essombe	(Lesotho) Letšepe Marabe	
3	Don Bosco FA	(Cameroon) George Forbia	(Nigeria) Ekomobong Victor Philip	(Nigeria) Andrew Michel	
4	FC Areekode				
5	FC Kerala				
6	Gokulam Kerala FC B	(Ghana) Rahim Osumanu	(Mali) Abdoulaye Kanouté	(Nigeria) Emmanual Jeremiah	(Trinidad and Tobago) Omri Abdiel
7	Golden Threads FC	(Ghana) Joseph Tetteh	(Ghana) Nuhu Seidu	(Ivory Coast) Ouattara Sie	
8	Kerala Blasters B				
9	Kerala Police				
10	Kerala United FC	(Brazil) Gabriel Lima Silva	(Brazil) Victor Santana	(Nigeria) Francis Nwankwo	
11	Kovalam Football Club				
12	KSEB				
13	Little Flower FA				
14	Luca Soccer Club	(Ghana) Charles Offei Quarcoo			
15	MA College				
16	Muthoot FA	(Argentina) Matías Verón	(Bhutan) Jigme Tshering Dorji	(Brazil) Wesley Wagner	
17	Parappur FC	(Ghana) Stephan Abeiku Acquah	(Guinea) Sanoh Louceny Pato	(Liberia) Alvin Jeh Teah	
18	SAI Kollam				
19	SAT Tirur	(Cameroon) Guy Herman Atimele	(Senegal) Seila Toure		
20	Travancore Royals FC	(Nigeria) John Chidi	(Nigeria) Bala Dahir		
21	Real Malabar FC	(Ghana) Obeng Kojo Forson	(Ghana) Bismarck Sersah	(Ghana) Kumi Emmanuel	
22	Wayanad United FC	(Ivory Coast) Vakaba Kourouma	(Liberia) Abubakar Dunnoh	(Niger) Abdoul Aziz	

== Group stage ==
=== Group A ===
Pos	Team	Pld	W	D	L	GF	GA	GD	Pts	Qualification
1	BASCO FC	10	7	3	0	27	4	+23	24	Advance to semi-finals
2	Sports Academy Tirur	10	7	2	1	21	4	+17	23	Advance to semi-finals
3	Kerala Police	10	5	5	0	19	10	+9	20	
4	Gokulam Kerala B	10	5	2	3	17	10	+7	17	
5	Wayanad United FC	10	3	4	3	7	6	+1	13	
6	Luca Soccer Club	10	3	4	3	10	12	−2	13	
7	Real Malabar FC	10	4	1	5	9	20	−11	13	
8	Parappur FC	10	3	3	4	17	19	−2	12	
9	FC Areekode	10	1	3	6	10	23	−13	6	
10	FC Kerala	10	1	2	7	4	14	−10	5	Relegation to 2022–23 KPL qualifiers
11	Altius IFA	10	1	1	8	7	23	−16	4	Relegation to 2022–23 KPL qualifiers

Source: KFA

=== Fixtures and results ===
Cancelled matches

8 January 2022	Real Malabar FC	0-7	Sports Academy Tirur	Kozhikode
15:30 IST			Arshad 13', 69'; Anandhu 26', 84'; Guy 74'; Sello Toure 83'; Fasalu 89'	Stadium: EMS Corporation Stadium, Kozhikode

9 January 2022	FC Areekode	2-2	AIFA	Kozhikode
15:30 IST	43'; Nepolian 45+2'		Hashif 20'; A.Ruban 90+7'	Stadium: EMS Corporation Stadium, Kozhikode

14 January 2022	FC Kerala	0-0	Luca Soccer Club	Kozhikode
15:30 IST				Stadium: EMS Corporation Stadium, Kozhikode

15 January 2022	AIFA	1-0	Real Malabar FC	Kozhikode
15:30 IST	Anoop 79'			Stadium: EMS Corporation Stadium, Kozhikode

16 January 2022	Parappur FC	1-5	Kerala Police	Kozhikode
15:30 IST	Muhammed Mishal 88'		Jamshid 63'; Anish 69'; Brijesh T Balan 71'; Firos K. 72'; Joy 83' (OG)	Stadium: EMS Corporation Stadium, Kozhikode

21 January 2022	Sports Academy Tirur	1-0	Wayanad United FC	Kozhikode
15:30 IST	Guy 44'			Stadium: EMS Corporation Stadium, Kozhikode

15 February 2022	Gokulam Kerala B	0-2	BASCO FC	Kozhikode
16:00 IST			Nazarudheen 40'; Vishnu 45'	Stadium: EMS Corporation Stadium, Kozhikode

16 February 2022	Luca Soccer Club	1-1	FC Areekode	Kozhikode
16:00 IST	Hafis 5' (OG)		Saheer 61'	Stadium: EMS Corporation Stadium, Kozhikode

17 February 2022	Wayanad United FC	0-1	Real Malabar FC	Kozhikode
16:00 IST			Ashif 45+1'	Stadium: EMS Corporation Stadium, Kozhikode

18 February 2022	AIFA	0-2	Gokulam Kerala B	Kozhikode
16:00 IST			Galin Joshy 27'; Kanoute 39'	Stadium: EMS Corporation Stadium, Kozhikode

20 February 2022	FC Areekode	1-2	Sports Academy Tirur	Kozhikode
16:00 IST	71'		Arshad 17', 56'	Stadium: EMS Corporation Stadium, Kozhikode

23 February 2022	BASCO FC	0-0	Wayanad United FC	Kozhikode
16:00 IST				Stadium: EMS Corporation Stadium, Kozhikode

24 February 2022	Kerala Police	2-1	FC Areekode	Kozhikode
16:00 IST	Bijesh 23'; Safwan 65'		Mishab 16'	Stadium: EMS Corporation Stadium, Kozhikode

25 February 2022	Gokulam Kerala B	0-0	Sports Academy Tirur	Kozhikode
16:00 IST				Stadium: EMS Corporation Stadium, Kozhikode

26 February 2022	Luca Soccer Club	3-0	Real Malabar FC	Kozhikode
16:00 IST	PV Vishnu 37'; Shahid 54'; Shibil CK 59'			Stadium: EMS Corporation Stadium, Kozhikode

27 February 2022	BASCO FC	0-0	Kerala Police	Kozhikode
16:00 IST				Stadium: EMS Corporation Stadium, Kozhikode

2 March 2022	FC Kerala	0-1	FC Areekode	Kozhikode
16:00 IST			Shaheer 56'	Stadium: EMS Corporation Stadium, Kozhikode

3 March 2022	Wayanad United FC	0-0	Kerala Police	Kozhikode
16:00 IST				Stadium: EMS Corporation Stadium, Kozhikode

3 March 2022	Sports Academy Tirur	3-0	Luca Soccer Club	Thrissur
18:30 IST				Stadium: Thrissur Municipal Corporation Stadium

4 March 2022	Real Malabar FC	1-4	BASCO FC	Kozhikode
16:00 IST	22'		Ashique 36', 39'; Essombe 56', 57'	Stadium: EMS Corporation Stadium, Kozhikode

4 March 2022	Parappur FC	4-1	AIFA	Thrissur
18:30 IST	Hafiz 24', 40'; Anandhu 52', 90+3'		Nabeel 3'	Stadium: Thrissur Municipal Corporation Stadium

5 March 2022	FC Areekode	1-4	Gokulam Kerala B	Kozhikode
16:00 IST	9'		Emmanuel 40'; Lalrinzuala 60'; Pandian 73'; Kivi 90+1'	Stadium: EMS Corporation Stadium, Kozhikode

6 March 2022	Luca Soccer Club	1-1	Kerala Police	Kozhikode
16:00 IST	Sajeesh 46'		Shibil 77'	Stadium: EMS Corporation Stadium, Kozhikode

10 March 2022	Kerala Police	3-1	Real Malabar FC	Kozhikode
16:00 IST	46'; Sreerag VG 62'; Bijesh T. Balan 76'		Muhammed Ishal 7'	Stadium: EMS Corporation Stadium, Kozhikode

11 March 2022	FC Areekode	0-5	BASCO FC	Kozhikode
16:00 IST			Ashiq 36', 74'; Nasar 57', 81'; 78'	Stadium: EMS Corporation Stadium, Kozhikode

11 March 2022	AIFA	0-2	Sports Academy Tirur	Thrissur
18:30 IST			Afsal 54'; Ananthu 65'	Stadium: Thrissur Municipal Corporation Stadium

12 March 2022	Wayanad United FC	0-1	Gokulam Kerala B	Kozhikode
16:00 IST			Emmanuel 6'	Stadium: EMS Corporation Stadium, Kozhikode

12 March 2022	Luca Soccer Club	0-2	Parappur FC	Thrissur
18:30 IST			Hafis 15'; Anandhu 56'	Stadium: Thrissur Municipal Corporation Stadium

13 March 2022	Kerala Police	3-2	FC Kerala	Thrissur
18:30 IST	Bijesh 4'; Gokul 45+1'; Sanju 89' (pen.)		Ranoof 60'; Bibin 84'	Stadium: Thrissur Municipal Corporation Stadium

15 March 2022	Luca Soccer Club	0-2	BASCO FC	Kozhikode
16:00 IST			Ashiq 5', 17'	Stadium: EMS Corporation Stadium

16 March 2022	Gokulam Kerala B	2-3	Real Malabar FC	Kozhikode
16:00 IST	Zuala 12' (pen.); Rahim Osumanu 17'		Sajidh 52'; Ijaz 63'; Ashif 90+3'	Stadium: EMS Corporation Stadium

17 March 2022	Parappur FC	1-2	Wayanad United FC	Kozhikode
16:00 IST	Frank 66'		Arun Lal 42'; Netto 51'	Stadium: EMS Corporation Stadium

18 March 2022	AIFA	0-1	FC Kerala	Kozhikode
16:00 IST			Melwin 52'	Stadium: EMS Corporation Stadium

19 March 2022	FC Areekode	0-2	Real Malabar FC	Thrissur
19:00 IST			Sajidh 2'; Jalal 79'	Stadium: Thrissur Municipal Corporation Stadium

20 March 2022	BASCO FC	N/A	Parappur FC	Thrissur
19:00 IST				Stadium: Thrissur Municipal Corporation Stadium

21 March 2022	Gokulam Kerala B	2-3	Luca Soccer Club	Thrissur
17:00 IST	Zuala 31'; Kanoute 71'		Bibin 3'; Vishnu 40', 42'	Stadium: Thrissur Municipal Corporation Stadium

21 March 2022	FC Kerala	0-1	Wayanad United FC	Thrissur
19:30 IST			Arunlal 86'	Stadium: Thrissur Municipal Corporation Stadium

22 March 2022	Kerala Police	3-2	AIFA	Thrissur
19:00 IST	Bijesh 15', 32'; Sajeesh 55'		Nabeel 21'; Sajeesh 50'	Stadium: Thrissur Municipal Corporation Stadium

23 March 2022	Sports Academy Tirur	1-2	BASCO FC	Thrissur
IST	Nisham 49'		Essombe 44'; Abdu Raheem 56'	Stadium: Thrissur Municipal Corporation Stadium

24 March 2022	FC Areekode	0-0	Wayanad United FC	Thrissur
17:00 IST				Stadium: Thrissur Municipal Corporation Stadium

24 March 2022	Real Malabar FC	1-0	FC Kerala	Thrissur
19:30 IST	Fahis 28'			Stadium: Thrissur Municipal Corporation Stadium

25 March 2022	Gokulam Kerala B	3-1	Parappur FC	Thrissur
17:00 IST	Osumanu 36'; Lalrinzuala 39'; Omri 75'		Frank 70'	Stadium: Thrissur Municipal Corporation Stadium

25 March 2022	AIFA	0-1	Luca Soccer Club	Thrissur
19:30 IST			Vishnu 60'	Stadium: Thrissur Municipal Corporation Stadium

27 March 2022	Sports Academy Tirur	2-0	FC Kerala	Thrissur
19:00 IST	Ananthu 63'; Nisham 64'			Stadium: Thrissur Municipal Corporation Stadium

28 March 2022	Parappur FC	5-2	FC Areekode	Thrissur
19:00 IST	Hafis 2', 27'; Frank 31', 45+1'; Jishnu 84'		Sabby 39'; Meiti 46'; Shaheer 90+2'	Stadium: Thrissur Municipal Corporation Stadium

30 March 2022	Luca Soccer Club	N/A	Wayanad United FC	Thrissur
17:00 IST				Stadium: Thrissur Municipal Corporation Stadium

30 March 2022	Gokulam Kerala B	N/A	Kerala Police	Thrissur
19:30 IST				Stadium: Thrissur Municipal Corporation Stadium

=== Group B ===
Pos	Team	Pld	W	D	L	GF	GA	GD	Pts	Qualification
1	Golden Threads	10	8	0	2	21	11	+10	24	Advance to semi-finals
2	KSEB	10	7	2	1	29	11	+18	23	Advance to semi-finals
3	Kerala United FC	10	7	1	2	21	8	+13	22	
4	Muthoot FA	10	7	0	3	23	11	+12	21	
5	SAI Kollam	10	4	2	4	16	16	0	14	
6	Travancore Royals FC	10	4	1	5	16	21	−5	13	
7	Don Bosco FA	10	3	3	4	18	15	+3	12	
8	Kovalam FC	10	3	1	6	11	17	−6	10	
9	Kerala Blasters B	10	3	0	7	11	20	−9	9	Relegation to 2022–23 KPL qualifiers
10	MA College	10	2	1	7	16	35	−19	7	Relegation to 2022–23 KPL qualifiers
11	Little Flower FA	10	1	1	8	7	24	−17	4	

Source: KFA

=== Fixtures and results ===
Cancelled matches

7 January 2022	Kerala United FC	1-1	KSEB	Kochi
15:30 IST	Arjun Jayaraj 58'		Vignesh 72'	Stadium: Maharaja's College Stadium

9 January 2022	Kovalam FC	1-3	Muthoot FA	Kochi
15:30 IST	Abin 46'		Piyush 53'; Ajin Tom 86'; Sentamil 88'	Stadium: Maharaja's College Stadium

14 January 2022	KSEB	3-2	Muthoot FA	Kochi
15:30 IST	Vignesh 16'; Muhammed Parokkottil 21'; Nijo Gilbert 73' (P)		Ajin Tom 66'; Denil Rebello 75'	Stadium: Maharaja's College Stadium

14 January 2022	Don Bosco FA	1-0	Kovalam FC	Kochi
15:30 IST			Manoj 53'OG	Stadium: Maharaja's College Stadium

16 January 2022	Kerala United FC	3-0	SAI Kollam	Kochi
15:30 IST	Arjun Jayaraj 3'; Adersh Mattummal 75'; MD Safnad 86'			Stadium: Maharaja's College Stadium

21 January 2022	Kerala Blasters B	0-2	Kerala United FC	Kochi
15:30 IST			Francis 26'; MD Jesin TK 74'	Stadium: Maharaja's College Stadium

15 February 2022	Travancore Royals FC	0-4	KSEB	Kochi
15:30 IST			Vignesh 37', 76'; Jijo 52'; Eldhose 85'	Stadium: Maharaja's College Stadium

16 February 2022	Golden Threads	2-0	MA College	Kochi
15:30 IST	Nuhu 16'; Joshi 63'			Stadium: Maharaja's College Stadium

17 February 2022	Kerala Blasters B	1-3	Kovalam FC	Kochi
16:00 IST	Anil Goanker 87'		Stalin 9', 16'; Stevin 31'	Stadium: Maharaja's College Stadium

18 February 2022	Kerala United FC	5-2	Little Flower FA	Kochi
16:00 IST	Safnad 31'; Athul U. 78'; Gabriel De Lama 81'; Ganesan 88'; Jesin TK 90+3'		Jebin 10'; Sharon 85'	Stadium: Maharaja's College Stadium

19 February 2022	KSEB	7-1	MA College	Kochi
16:00 IST	Muhammed Parokottil 15'; Vignesh 24', 55', 90+1'; Jijo 31', 45+3'; John Paul 64'		Navin 83'	Stadium: Maharaja's College Stadium

20 February 2022	Muthoot FA	2-4	Golden Threads	Kochi
16:00 IST	Matías Verón 39'; Wesly Wagner 75'		Nuhu Seidu 36', 68'; Quattara 45+1'; Sal Anas 89'	Stadium: Maharaja's College Stadium

23 February 2022	MA College	5-4	Travancore Royals FC	Kochi
16:00 IST	Navin M. Raghu 14', 38'; Delan Denny 41'; Muhammed Ajsal 57'; Salahudheen 78'		Vivek 2'; John Britto 5'; John Chidi 49'; Divakar 52'	Stadium: Maharaja's College Stadium

24 February 2022	Kerala United FC	3-1	Kovalam FC	Kochi
16:00 IST	Jesin TK 25'; Francis 28', 39'		Manoj 89'	Stadium: Maharaja's College Stadium

25 February 2022	KSEB	2-2	Don Bosco FA	Kochi
16:00 IST	Jijo 18'; Jacob 73'		Roshan 12'; Victor 29'	Stadium: Maharaja's College Stadium

26 February 2022	Golden Threads	1-0	LIFFA	Kochi
16:00 IST	Tetteh 44'			Stadium: Maharaja's College Stadium

27 February 2022	Kerala Blasters B	0-2	Muthoot FA	Kochi
16:00 IST			Matías Verón 12', 23'	Stadium: Maharaja's College Stadium

2 March 2022	Golden Threads	1-0	Kerala United FC	Kochi
16:00 IST	Quattara 86'			Stadium: Maharaja's College Stadium

3 March 2022	SAI Kollam	0-1	Muthoot FA	Kochi
16:00 IST			Matías Verón 86'	Stadium: Maharaja's College Stadium

4 March 2022	LIFFA	2-1	Kerala Blasters B	Kochi
16:00 IST	Martin 70'; Bebetto 89'		Anil 90'	Stadium: Maharaja's College Stadium

5 March 2022	Kovalam FC	0-2	Travancore Royals FC	Thrissur
18:30 IST			John Chidi 18', 55'	Stadium: Thrissur Municipal Corporation Stadium

6 March 2022	SAI Kollam	5-2	KSEB	Thrissur
17:00 IST	Shaheer 6'; Vishnu 10', 78'; Prathap 83'; Josefin 90+5'		John Paul 46', 51'	Stadium: Thrissur Municipal Corporation Stadium

6 March 2022	Kerala United FC	4-0	MA College	Thrissur
19:30 IST	Victor 33', 47', 49', 71'			Stadium: Thrissur Municipal Corporation Stadium

9 March 2022	Don Bosco FA	1-2	Golden Threads	Kochi
16:00 IST	Roshan 19'		Nuhu 55'; Quattara 75' (pen.)	Stadium: Maharaja's College Stadium

9 March 2022	KSEB	3-0	Kerala Blasters B	Thrissur
18:30 IST	Vignesh 48'; Nijo 52', 78'			Stadium: Thrissur Municipal Corporation Stadium

10 March 2022	Travancore Royals FC	0-1	Kerala United FC	Kochi
16:00 IST			Nidhin 90+7'	Stadium: Maharaja's College Stadium

11 March 2022	SAI Kollam	1-2	Kovalam FC	Kochi
16:00 IST	Minesh 45+2'		Stalin 34', 37'	Stadium: Maharaja's College Stadium

12 March 2022	Don Bosco FA	0-0	LIFFA	Kochi
16:00 IST				Stadium: Maharaja's College Stadium

13 March 2022	KSEB	2-0	Golden Threads	Kochi
16:00 IST	John Paul 62'; Nijo 90+4'			Stadium: Maharaja's College Stadium

14 March 2022	Muthoot FA	2-0	Kerala United FC	Kochi
16:00 IST	Senthamil 75', 88'			Stadium: Maharaja's College Stadium

15 March 2022	SAI Kollam	2-2	Don Bosco FA	Kochi
16:00 IST	Shahir 22'; Shijin 42'		Roshan 12'; Victor 55'	Stadium: Maharaja's College Stadium

16 March 2022	Travancore Royals FC	2-1	Kerala Blasters B	Kochi
16:00 IST	Rakesh 20'; Sujith 76'		Aimen 90'	Stadium: Maharaja's College Stadium

17 March 2022	LIFFA	0-4	KSEB	Kochi
16:00 IST			Viknesh 45+1'; Jerritto 49'; Gifty 65'; Nijo 84'	Stadium: Maharaja's College Stadium

17 March 2022	MA College	0-3	Muthoot FA	Thrissur
19:00 IST			Wesly Wagner 30'; Matías Verón 32'; Senthamizhi 69'	Stadium: Thrissur Municipal Corporation Stadium

18 March 2022	Don Bosco FA	1-2	Kerala United FC	Kochi
16:00 IST		Victor 16'	Victor Santana 56'; Jesin 73'	Stadium: Maharaja's College Stadium

19 March 2022	Travancore Royals FC	0-0	SAI Kollam	Kochi
16:00 IST				Stadium: Maharaja's College Stadium

19 March 2022	Kerala Blasters B	3-2	Golden Threads	Kochi
16:00 IST				Stadium: Sports Council Ground, Panampilly Nagar

20 March 2022	Kovalam FC	0-1	KSEB	Kochi
16:00 IST			Viknesh 88'	Stadium: Sports Council Ground, Panampilly Nagar

21 March 2022	Muthoot FA	4-0	LIFFA	Kochi
16:00 IST	Wesley Wagner 10'; Matías Verón 15', 21', 46'			Stadium: Sports Council Ground, Panampilly Nagar

22 March 2022	Travancore Royals FC	4-1	Don Bosco FA	Kochi
16:00 IST	Jino 21', 58'; Wesley Wagner 10'; John Chidi 55', 59'		Abhy 86'	Stadium: Sports Council Ground, Panampilly Nagar

22 March 2022	SAI Kollam	1-2	Golden Threads	Kochi
16:00 IST	Faseen 10' (pen.)		Roshan 47'; Nuhu 89'	Stadium: Maharaja's College Stadium

23 March 2022	Kovalam FC	2-2	MA College	Kochi
16:00 IST	Stevin 58', 86'		Vijay 62'; Aslam 90+2'	Stadium: Sports Council Ground, Panampilly Nagar

25 March 2022	Muthoot FA	3-0	Travancore Royals FC	Kochi
16:00 IST	Wesley Wagner 8', 13'; Senthamil 83'			Stadium: Sports Council Ground, Panampilly Nagar

26 March 2022	LIFFA	0-1	SAI Kollam	Kochi
16:00 IST			Josefin 57' (o.g.)	Stadium: Sports Council Ground, Panampilly Nagar

27 March 2022	MA College	0-6	Don Bosco FA	Kochi
16:00 IST			George 22'; Victor 58'; Arjun 71', 75'<nr />Roshan 83'; Vinay 90+2'	Stadium: Sports Council Ground, Panampilly Nagar

28 March 2022	Kovalam FC	0-2	Golden Threads	Kochi
16:00 IST			Nuhu 9', 74'	Stadium: Sports Council Ground, Panampilly Nagar

29 March 2022	Kerala Blasters B	N/A	SAI Kollam	Kochi
16:00 IST				Stadium: Sports Council Ground, Panampilly Nagar

30 March 2022	Muthoot FA	N/A	Don Bosco FA	Kochi
16:00 IST				Stadium: Sports Council Ground, Panampilly Nagar

== Knockout stage ==
=== Bracket ===
Semi-finals
A1	BASCO FC	1
B2	KSEB	2
B1	Golden Threads	1
A2	Sports Academy Tirur	0

Final
KSEB	0
Golden Threads	2

=== Semi-finals ===
8 April 2022	BASCO FC	1-2	KSEB	Kozhikode
15:30 IST				Stadium: EMS Corporation Stadium

8 April 2022	Golden Threads	1-0	Sports Academy Tirur	Kochi
15:30 IST				Stadium: Maharaja's College Stadium

=== Final ===
10 April 2022	KSEB	0-2	Golden Threads	Kozhikode
15.30				Stadium: EMS Corporation Stadium

== Prize money ==
Winners received 5 lakhs and runners-up received 3 lakhs Rs after the KPL final.

== Season statistics ==
=== Top scorers ===
No	Player	Club	Goals
1	(Ghana) Nuhu Seidu	Golden Threads FC	12
2	(India) Vignesh	KSEB	11
3	(Argentina) Matías Verón	Muthoot FA	9
4	(India) Muhammed Ashiq	Basco	7
4	(India) Bijesh T Balan	Kerala Police	7
6	(India) Nijo Gilbert	KSEB	5
6	(Brazil) Victor Santana	Kerala United FC	5
6	(India) Arshad	SAT	4
6	(India) Jijo Joseph	KSEB	4
6	(India) Stalin	Kovalam FC	4
6	(India) Senthamizhi	Muthoot	4
6	(India) Jesin TK	Kerala United FC	4

=== Hat-tricks ===
Note: The score of the player's team is displayed first in the result column.

Player	For	Against	Result	Date
(India) Vignesh	KSEB	MA college	7–1	19 February 2022
(Brazil) Victor Santana	Kerala United FC	MA college	4–0	6 March 2022
(Argentina) Matías Verón	Muthoot FA	LIFFA	4–0	21 March 2022
(Ghana) Nuhu Seidu	Golden Threads FC	Travancore Royals FC	5–2	1 April 2022

=== Clean sheets ===
No	Player	Club	Clean sheets
1	(India) Abhishek Calvin	Muthoot FA	7
2	(India) Muhammed Suhail	SAT	6
3	(India) Jaseer Muhammed	Basco FC	5
4	(India) Hajmal S	KSEB	4
5	(India) Manobin CM	Golden Threads	3
6	(India) Mithun V	Kerala United	2
6	(India) Muhammed Azhar	Kerala Police	2
6	(India) Shibin	Luca	2
6	(India) Christurajan T	Kerala United	2
6	(India) Muhammed Nishad	Gokulam Kerala B	2
6	(India) Goutham Muralitharan	Don Bosco	2

== Season awards ==
Award	Winner	Club
Player of the league	(India) Vignesh Mariya	KSEB
Golden boot	(Ghana) Isahak Nuhu Seidu	Golden Threads FC
Golden glove	(India) Hajmal S	KSEB

== See also ==
- 2021–22 season in state football leagues of India
  - 2021–22 Bangalore Super Division
  - 2021–22 Chennai Senior Division
