= 2025–26 Calicut FC season =

Indian football club season

Calicut
2025–26 season
- Owner: Futurepoint Sports and Entertainment PVT.LTD
- Chairman: VK Mathews
- Head coach: Biby Thomas
- Stadium: EMS Stadium
- Kerala Premier League: Runners-up
- All statistics correct as of 24 February 2025.

The 2025–26 season was Calicut's Second since its establishment in 2024 and their first in the Kerala Premier League.

== Players ==
=== First-team squad ===
As of 10 May 2026

Note: Flags indicate national team as defined under FIFA eligibility rules; some limited exceptions apply. Players may hold more than one non-FIFA nationality.

No.	Pos.	Nation	Player
3	DF	IND	Henry Joseph
4	DF	IND	Muhammed Ameen
6	DF	IND	Sachin Dev
7	FW	IND	Muhammed Roshal
8	MF	IND	Lalremruata
9	FW	IND	Junain Kadavalath
11	FW	IND	Gani Nigam
12	MF	IND	Muhammed Rashid
13	GK	IND	Bishorjit Singh
14	MF	IND	Arun Kumar
15	MF	IND	Arjun Jayaraj
16	DF	IND	Arap Konyak
17	FW	IND	Ajith KR
19	FW	IND	Rifhath Ramzan
20	FW	IND	Shamnad KP
21	FW	IND	Muhammed Sanaf

No.	Pos.	Nation	Player
24	DF	IND	Muhammed Aslam
25	DF	IND	Cirin Varghese
30	FW	IND	Adam David
29	MF	IND	Yhoto Lohe
31	DF	IND	Manoj M
44	DF	IND	Rijohn Jose
66	DF	IND	Nidhin Madhu
77	FW	IND	Rahul Venu
80	MF	IND	Ajad Shaheem
88	FW	IND	Antony K Paulose
96	GK	IND	Muhammed Anas
99	DF	IND	Sandeep S
—	GK	IND	Aalok Tishrei Mathew
—	GK	IND	Parthiv KM
—	DF	IND	Ningthoujam Lanchenba
—	MF	IND	Abu Swalih
—	FW	IND	Hasir V

=== Other Players Under Contract ===
Note: Flags indicate national team as defined under FIFA eligibility rules; some limited exceptions apply. Players may hold more than one non-FIFA nationality.

No.	Pos.	Nation	Player
18	DF	IND	Muhammed Riyas
19	FW	IND	Mohammed Ashique
23	GK	IND	Muhammed Niyas
43	GK	IND	Sharon P

== Current technical staff ==
=== Current technical staff ===
Position	Name
Head coach	(India) Biby Thomas
Assistant coach	(India) PP Hussain
Physio	(India) Anand GR
Team Manager	(India) Said Ibnu Haris
Kit Manager	(India) Pratheesh Lawrence

== Transfers and loans ==
=== Transfers in ===
Date	Pos.	Player	Transferred From	Fee	References
02 March 2026	MF	(India) Arjun Jayaraj	Free Agent	Free Transfer	
02 March 2026	MF	(India) Muhammed Rashid	Free Agent	Free Transfer	
02 March 2026	GK	(India) Bishorjit Singh	Gokulam Kerala	Free Transfer	
02 March 2026	WF	(India) Gani Nigam	Malappuram	Free Transfer	
02 March 2026	GK	(India) Aalok Tishrei Mathew	Muthoot FA	Free Transfer	
02 March 2026	DF	(India) Ningthoujam Lanchenba	Classic FA	Free Transfer	
02 March 2026	DF	(India) Sandeep S	Kannur Warriors	Free Transfer	
02 March 2026	MF	(India) Abu Swalih	Sporting Club Kerala	Free Transfer	
02 March 2026	MF	(India) Ajad Shaheem	East Bengal B	Free Transfer	
02 March 2026	FW	(India) Rifhath Ramzan	SAT	Free Transfer	
02 March 2026	FW	(India) Rahul Venu	SAT	Free Transfer	
02 March 2026	FW	(India) Junain Kadavath	Muthoot FA	Free Transfer	
13 March 2026	DF	(India) Rijohn Jose	Forca Kochi	Free Transfer	
20 April 2026	FW	(India) Antony K Paulose		Free Transfer	
20 April 2026	MF	(India) Yhoto Lohe		Free Transfer	
20 April 2026	DF	(India) Nithin Madhu	Kerala United	Free Transfer	
1 May 2026	DF	(India) Arap Konyak		Free Transfer	
1 May 2026	DF	(India) Muhammed Ameen MM	Wayanad United	Free Transfer	

=== Transfers Out ===
Date	Pos.	Player	Transferred To	Fee	References
16 January 2026	MF	(India) Seiminlen Doungel	(India) Inter Kashi	Free Transfer	
01 February 2026	MF	(India) Mohammed Arshaf	(India) NorthEast United	Loan Return	
01 February 2026	LW	(India) Muhammad Ajsal	(India) Kerala Blasters	Loan Return	
01 February 2026	DF	(India) Jagannath Jayan	(India) Kerala Blasters	Loan Return	
13 February 2026	MF	(India) Prasanth Mohan	(India) Inter Kashi	Free Transfer	
13 February 2026	MF	(India) Mohammed Asif Khan	(India) Inter Kashi	Free Transfer	
1 March 2026	MF	(India) Aniket Jadhav		Free Transfer	
1 March 2026	GK	(India) Aman Sahni		Free Transfer	
1 March 2026	GK	(India) Hajmal Sakeer	(India) KSEB	Free Transfer	
1 March 2026	MF	(India) Arjun V	(India) KSEB	Free Transfer	
1 March 2026	DF	(India) Shabas Ahammed	(India) Kerala Police	Free Transfer	
1 March 2026	MF	(India) Christy Davis	(India) Inter Kerala	Free Transfer	
1 March 2026	DF	(India) Ajay Alex	(India) Golden Threads	Free Transfer	
1 March 2026	DF	(India) Mohamed Salim	(India) KSEB	Free Transfer	
1 March 2026	MF	(India) Vishakh Mohanan	(India) Golden Threads	Free Transfer	

== Competitions ==
=== Kerala Premier League ===
==== Matches ====
8 March 2026 1	Gokulam Kerala B	0-1	Calicut	Kozhikode
19.00 IST			Arjun Jayaraj 15' (P)	Stadium: EMS Stadium; Referee: Ajay Krishnan

29 March 2026 2	Calicut	1-1	Wayanad United	Thrissur
19.00 IST	Arun Kumar D			Stadium: Thrissur Municipal Corporation Stadium

1 April 2026 3	SAI Centre	0-4	Calicut	Thrissur
19.00 IST			Shmnad 7', 41'; Roshal 79'; Ajith 90+1'	Stadium: Thrissur Municipal Corporation Stadium

6 April 2026 4	Real Malabar	1-0	Calicut	Thrissur
19.00 IST				Stadium: Thrissur Municipal Corporation Stadium

16 April 2026 5	Calicut	2-0	EMEA College	Thrissur
19:00 IST	Manoj M 85'; Arun Kumar 90+4'			Stadium: Thrissur Municipal Corporation Stadium; Man of the Match: Manoj M

28 April 2026 6	Kerala Blasters B	1-2	Calicut	Thrissur
16.30 IST			Antony 19'; Junain 34'	Stadium: Thrissur Municipal Corporation Stadium

==== Super Eight Matches ====
6 May 2026 1	Golden Threads	2-1	Calicut	Thrissur
20:00 IST	Bibin Ajayan 4'		Antony K Paulose 51'; Y.Lohe 90+1'	Stadium: Thrissur Municipal Corporation Stadium; Man of the Match: Arun Kumar (Calicut)

9 May 2026 2	Calicut	2-1	KSEB	Thrissur
20:00 IST	Antony K Paulose 63'; Rahul Venu 90+4'			Stadium: Thrissur Municipal Corporation Stadium; Man of the Match: Antony Paulose (Calicut)

12 May 2026 3	Calicut	1-0	EMEA College	Thrissur
17:00 IST	Arun Kumar 71'			Stadium: Thrissur Municipal Corporation Stadium

17 May 2026 4	Kerala Police	1-3	Calicut	Thrissur
17:00 IST	Sajeesh 42'		Y.Lohe 53'; Antony K Paulose 79'; Arjun Jayaraj 90+3'	Stadium: Thrissur Municipal Corporation Stadium

20 May 2026 5	Calicut	Cancelled	Inter Kerala	Thrissur
17:00 IST				Stadium: Thrissur Municipal Corporation Stadium

22 May 2026 6	Calicut	2-0	Real Malabar	Thrissur
17:00 IST	Arap 19'; Manoj 56'			Stadium: Thrissur Municipal Corporation Stadium; Man of the Match: Rijohn Jose (Calicut)

26 May 2026 7	Gokulam Kerala B	0-2	Calicut	Thrissur
20:00 IST			62' (o.g.); Shamnad 76'	Stadium: Thrissur Municipal Corporation Stadium

==== Semi Final ====
29 May 2026 SF	Calicut	2-1	Kerala Police	Thrissur
17:00 IST				Stadium: Thrissur Municipal Corporation Stadium

==== Final ====
31 May 2026 F	Calicut	2-3	Gokulam Kerala B	Thrissur
19:00 IST				Stadium: Thrissur Municipal Corporation Stadium

== Statistics ==
=== Goalscorers ===
Rank	Nation	Name	No.	Position(s)	KPL	Total
1	(India)	Antony K Paulose	88	CF	4	4
2	(India)	Muhammed Ameen	4	DF	3	3
2	(India)	Arun Kumar D	14	MF	3	3
2	(India)	Shmnad KP	20	CF	3	3
5	(India)	Arjun Jayaraj	15	AM	2	2
5	(India)	Yhoto Lohe	29	MF	2	2
5	(India)	Manoj M	31	DF	2	2
8	(India)	Muhammed Roshal	7	CF	1	1
8	(India)	Junain Kadavalath	9	CF	1	1
8	(India)	Arap Konyak	16	DF	1	1
8	(India)	Ajith KR	17	WF	1	1
8	(India)	Rifahath Ramzan	19	CF	1	1
8	(India)	Rahul Venu	77	CF	1	1

=== Clean Sheets ===
Rank	No.	Nation	Name	KPL	Total
1	13	(India)	Bishorjit Singh	4	4
2	96	(India)	Muhammed Anas	2	2
