= 2024–25 Kerala Premier League =

12th season of Kerala Premier League

Kerala Premier League
- Season: 2024–25
- Dates: 27 January – 11 May 2025
- Champions: Muthoot FA
- Longest winning run: KSEB (7 games)
- Longest unbeaten run: KSEB (10 games)
- Longest winless run: Devagiri College (13 games)

The 2024–25 Kerala Premier League was the twelfth season of the Kerala Premier League, which is the highest level of the state league system and fifth of the overall Indian football league system.

Muthoot FA won the league title.

== Changes from last season ==
▲ Corporate entry
- Inter Kerala FC

Withdrew
- SAT
▼ Relegated to KPL 2
- BASCO FC
- FC Areekode
- Little Flower FA
- LUCA SC
- MK Sporting Club
- SAI Kollam

== Teams ==
KFA

	Team	Head coach	Captain	City	Sponsor
1	Devagiri College	(India) Niyaz Rahman	Vishnu Prakash	Kozhikode	Hykon
2	FC Kerala	(India) Assis Kunjivappu	Jithu TR	Thrissur	Premiere
3	Golden Threads FC	(India) Shiju Rajan	Subi	Kochi	Wayna Water
4	Gokulam Kerala B	(India) Varun Mehta	Bibin Boban	Kozhikode	CSB Bank
5	Inter Kerala FC	(India) Britto Clemmy	Shem Marton Eugene	Kothamangalam	
6	Kerala Blasters B	(India) Noel Joseph	Ebin Das	Kochi	Medhaa
7	Kerala Police	(India) Siddik VV	Sanju G	Trivandrum	Off Road Nilambur
8	Kerala United FC	(India) Liandala Sena Fanai	Craig Mangkhanlian	Manjeri	YELO
9	KSEB	(India) Sanushraj Palanickal	Eldhose George	Trivandrum	KSEB
10	Kovalam	(India) Rajesh Mohanan	Manoj M	Kovalam	Adani Group
11	Muthoot FA	(India) Othallo Tabia	Bavijith TK	Kochi	Muthoot Pappachan Group
12	Parappur FC	(India) Sanjoy Kumar Dey	Anto V	Parappur	Jos Alukkas
13	Real Malabar FC	(India) Rajeev Raj	Fahis	Kondotty	EDEX
14	Wayanad United	(India) Daison Cheriyan	Muhammed Ameen	Kalpetta	SKAMPILO

=== Number of teams by region ===
No. of teams	Districts	Team(s)
4	Ernakulam	Golden Threads, Inter Kerala, Kerala Blasters B, Muthoot FA
3	Trivandrum	Kerala Police, Kovalam, KSEB
2	Malappuram	Kerala United, Real Malabar
2	Kozhikode	Devagiri College, Gokulam Kerala B
2	Thrissur	FC Kerala, Parappur FC
1	Wayanad	Wayanad United

== Venues ==
Stadium	Capacity	Location
Payyanad Stadium	30,000	Manjeri
EMS Stadium	50,000	Kozhikode
Govt. Boys HSS Ground	1,000	Kunnamkulam

== League table ==
Pos	Team	Pld	W	D	L	GF	GA	GD	Pts	Qualification
1	KSEB	13	9	3	1	27	12	+15	30	Advance to Semi-finals
2	Kerala Police	13	8	4	1	21	13	+8	28	Advance to Semi-finals
3	Muthoot FA	13	8	3	2	32	10	+22	27	Advance to Semi-finals
4	Wayanad United	13	7	3	3	23	12	+11	24	Advance to Semi-finals
5	Golden Threads	13	7	3	3	28	19	+9	24	
6	Kerala United	13	6	1	6	16	15	+1	19	
7	Gokulam Kerala B	13	5	3	5	19	16	+3	18	
8	Kovalam	13	5	1	7	20	24	−4	16	
9	Kerala Blasters B	13	4	3	6	22	24	−2	15	
10	Real Malabar	13	3	6	4	19	23	−4	15	
11	PFC Kerala	13	4	0	9	16	21	−5	12	
12	Inter Kerala	13	3	2	8	16	21	−5	11	
13	FC Kerala	13	3	1	9	14	43	−29	10	Relegation to the 2025–26 Kerala Premier League 2
14	Devagiri College	13	0	5	8	15	35	−20	5	Relegation to the 2025–26 Kerala Premier League 2

Source: The Away End
Rules for classification: 1) points; 2) goal difference; 3) number of goals scored

== Fixtures and results ==
Home \ Away	SJC	FCK	GTFC	GKFC	IKFC	KBFC	KP	KUFC	KSEB	KFC	MFA	PFC	RMFC	WUFC
Devagiri College	—	1–2	2–6	0–2	1–4	2–2	1–1	0–1	2–2	2–2	2–4	0–4	2–2	0–3
FC Kerala	2–1	—	2–2	0–4	2–1	0–4	1–4	2–6	1–4	1–3	0–6	1–0	2–4	0–4
Golden Threads	6–2	2–2	—	5–2	2–1	1–0	2–3	2–1	2–2	1–0	0–1	2–1	2–2	1–2
Gokulam Kerala 'B'	2–0	4–0	2–5	—	1–2	0–1	0–0	1–0	1–1	3–1	0–0	2–1	1–2	2–3
Inter Kerala	4–1	1–2	1–2	2–1	—	2–2	0–2	0–1	0–1	1–2	1–4	1–2	1–1	2–0
Kerala Blasters B	2–2	4–0	0–1	1–0	2–2	—	1–3	0–2	0–2	1–2	0–4	5–2	5–3	1–1
Kerala Police	1–1	4–1	3–2	0–0	2–0	3–1	—	2–0	0–5	1–0	2–1	2–1	0–0	1–1
Kerala United	1–0	6–2	1–2	0–1	1–0	2–0	0–2	—	0–2	2–0	0–3	2–0	1–1	0–1
KSEB	2–2	4–1	2–2	1–1	1–0	2–0	5–0	2–0	—	3–1	2–1	1–0	2–0	0–4
Kovalam	2–2	3–1	0–1	1–3	2–1	2–1	0–1	0–2	1–3	—	2–5	0–2	4–1	2–1
Muthoot FA	4–2	6–0	1–0	0–0	4–1	4–0	1–2	3–0	1–2	5–2	—	2–0	0–0	1–1
PFC Kerala	4–0	0–1	1–2	1–2	2–1	2–5	1–2	0–2	0–1	2–0	0–2	—	3–1	0–2
Real Malabar FC	2–2	4–2	2–2	2–1	1–1	3–5	0–0	1–1	0–2	1–4	0–0	1–3	—	2–0
Wayanad United FC	3–0	4–0	2–1	3–2	0–2	1–1	1–1	1–0	4–0	1–2	1–1	2–0	0–2	—

Source: The Away End
Legend: Blue = home team win; Yellow = draw; Red = away team win.

== Knockout stage ==
Semifinals
2	Kerala Police	1
4	Wayanad Utd	0
1	KSEB	0
3	Muthoot FA	1

Finals
2	Kerala Police	1
3	Muthoot FA	2

=== Final ===
11 May 2025

Kerala Police	1–2	Muthoot FA
Sujil NS 54'		Devadath S 45'; Abith KB 65'

EMS Corporation Stadium, Kozhikode

== Statistics ==
=== Top scorers ===
Rank	Player	Team	Goals
1	Muhammad Ajsal	Kerala Blasters B	6
1	Arjun V	KSEB	6
1	Sajeesh E	Kerala Police	6
4	Rupam Roy	PFC Kerala	5
4	Mahesh K	Real Malabar FC	5
6	Piyush Sikarwar	PFC Kerala	4
7	Muhammed Shafeeq	Kovalam	3
7	Amal KA	FC Kerala	3
7	Vishnu CV	Golden Threads	3
7	Arun Lal M	Wayanad United	3
7	Shijin Thadayouse	Gokulam Kerala B	3
7	Nandhu Krishna	Gokulam Kerala B	3
7	Nijo Gilbert	KSEB	3
7	Ebin Das	Kerala Blasters B	3
7	Ajay Krishnan	Muthoot FA	3
7	Devdath S	Muthoot FA	3

=== Hat-tricks ===
Player	For	Against	Result	Date	Ref
Sajeesh E	Kerala Police	Golden Threads	3-2	10 February 2025	
Mahesh K	Real Malabar	FC Kerala	4-2	23 February 2025	
Nandu Krishna	Gokulam Kerala B	FC Kerala	4-0	19 March 2025	
Muhammad Ajsal	Kerala Blasters B	Real Malabar	5-3	21 March 2025	

== See also ==
- 2024–25 Indian Super League (Tier I)
  - 2024–25 I-League (Tier II)
  - 2024–25 I-League 2 (Tier III)
  - 2024–25 I-League 3 (Tier IV)
  - 2024–25 Indian State Leagues (Tier V)
  - 2024–25 Super Cup
  - 2024 Durand Cup
- Women
  - 2024–25 Indian Women's League
  - 2024–25 Indian Women's League 2
