= 2025–26 Kerala Premier League =

13th season of Kerala Premier League

Kerala Premier League
- Season: 2025–26
- Dates: 8 March – 28 April 2026 (Regular season); 6 May – 26 May 2026 (Super Eight); 29 May 2026 (Play off); 31 May 2026 (Final)
- Champions: Gokulam Kerala B
- Promoted: Calicut
- Matches: 67
- Goals: 207 (3.09 per match)
- Top goalscorer: Nijo Gilbert; Sajeesh E (8 goals)
- Biggest win: Golden Threads 6–0 Kerala Police (18 April 2026)
- Highest scoring: EMEA College 4–4 Real Malabar (25 May 2026)
- Longest winning run: Calicut (8 matches)
- Longest unbeaten run: Calicut (8 matches)
- Longest winless run: Kerala United; SAI Centre; Real Malabar (6 matches)
- Longest losing run: Kerala United (6 matches)

The 2025–26 Kerala Premier League was the thirteenth season of the Kerala Premier League, the highest level of the state league system in Kerala and fifth of the overall Indian football league system. Muthoot FA were the defending champions.

== Teams ==
Fourteen teams are competing in the league: the top eleven teams from the previous season and two promoted from the KPL 2 and a corporate entry, Super League Kerala side Calicut, the first SLK franchise to do so.

=== Changes from the previous season ===
Promoted to I League 3

- Muthoot FA (withdrew)

Corporate entry

- Calicut

Promoted to the Kerala Premier League

- EMEA College
- SAI Centre

Relegated to KPL 2

- Devagiri College
- FC Kerala

=== Teams and locations ===
KFA

	Team	City
1	Calicut	Kozhikode
2	EMEA College	Kondotty
3	Golden Threads	Kochi
4	Gokulam Kerala B	Kozhikode
5	Inter Kerala	Kothamangalam
6	Kerala Blasters B	Kochi
7	Kerala Police	Trivandrum
8	Kerala United	Thrissur
9	KSEB	Trivandrum
10	Kovalam	Kovalam
11	PFC Kerala	Thrissur
12	Real Malabar	Kondotty
13	SAI Centre	Kollam
14	Wayanad United	Kalpetta

== Personnel and sponsorship ==
KFA

	Team	Manager	Captain	Kit manufacturer	Sponsor (chest)	Sponsor (sleeve)
1	Calicut	(India) Biby Thomas	Arjun Jayaraj	Loop	Peekay Steels	
2	EMEA College	(India) Ameen Navas	Fahad		Sky Ford	
3	Golden Threads FC	(India) Shiju Rajan	Ajay Alex		Wayna Water, BEO Software	
4	Gokulam Kerala B	(India) Rajeev Ponnanthari	Bibin Boban			
5	Inter Kerala FC	(India) Britto Clemmy	Akhil Praveen			
6	Kerala Blasters B	(India) Noel Joseph	Jaganath Jayan			
7	Kerala Police	(India) Siddik VV	Abhinav		Chips Oman	
8	Kerala United FC	(India) Shelbin Francis	Nikhil Raj			
9	KSEB	(India) Sanushraj Palanickal	Hajmal Sakeer		KSEB	
10	Kovalam	(India) Rajesh Mohanan			KIMS Health	
11	PFC Kerala	(India) Sanjoy Kumar Dey	Iqlaq Fayaz		Jos Alukkas	
12	Real Malabar FC	(India) Haary Benny	Aboobacker Dilshad		EDEX	
13	SAI Centre		Wangden Lama			
14	Wayanad United	(India) Daison Cheriyan			SKAMPILO	

== Venues ==
Stadium	Capacity	Location
EMS Stadium	50,000	Kozhikode
Thrissur Municipal Corporation Stadium	15,000	Thrissur

== Group stage ==
=== Group A ===
Pos	Team	Pld	W	D	L	GF	GA	GD	Pts	Qualification
1	EMEA College	6	5	0	1	11	3	+8	15	Advance to Super Eight
2	Calicut FC	6	4	1	1	10	3	+7	13	Advance to Super Eight
3	Real Malabar	6	3	1	2	8	6	+2	10	Advance to Super Eight
4	Gokulam Kerala B	6	3	0	3	10	8	+2	9	Advance to Super Eight
5	Wayanad United	6	1	3	2	9	12	−3	6	
6	Kerala Blasters B	6	1	2	3	7	10	−3	5	
7	SAI Centre	6	0	1	5	6	19	−13	1	Relegation to the 2026–27 Kerala Premier League 2

Source: The Away End
Rules for classification: 1) points; 2) goal difference; 3) number of goals scored

=== Group B ===
Pos	Team	Pld	W	D	L	GF	GA	GD	Pts	Qualification
1	Kerala Police	6	4	1	1	13	7	+6	13	Super Eight
2	Golden Threads	6	3	2	1	13	4	+9	11	Super Eight
3	KSEB	6	3	2	1	9	4	+5	11	Super Eight
4	Inter Kerala	6	3	1	2	10	6	+4	10	Super Eight
5	Kovalam	6	1	3	2	7	13	−6	6	
6	PFC Kerala	6	1	2	3	6	7	−1	5	
7	Kerala United	6	0	0	6	4	20	−16	0	Relegation to the 2026–27 Kerala Premier League 2

Source: The Away End

== Super Eight ==
Pos	Team	Pld	W	D	L	GF	GA	GD	Pts	Qualification
1	Calicut FC	6	6	0	0	12	3	+9	18	Qualification For Semifinals
2	KSEB	6	4	0	2	12	10	+2	12	Qualification For Semifinals
3	Kerala Police	6	3	1	2	11	7	+4	10	Qualification For Semifinals
4	Gokulam Kerala B	6	2	2	2	8	5	+3	8	Qualification For Semifinals
5	Golden Threads	6	2	2	2	8	9	−1	8	
6	EMEA College	6	0	2	4	6	12	−6	2	
7	Real Malabar	6	0	1	5	8	19	−11	1	
8	Inter Kerala (withdrew)	3	0	2	1	5	6	−1	2	

Updated to match(es) played on 26 May 2026. Source: The Away End
Rules for classification: 1) points; 2) goal difference; 3) number of goals scored

== Knockout stage ==
Semifinals
1	Calicut	2
3	Kerala Police	1
2	KSEB	1
4	Gokulam Kerala B	2

Finals
1	Calicut	2
2	Gokulam Kerala B	3

=== Final ===
31 May 2026

Calicut	2-3	Gokulam Kerala B

Thrissur

== Statistics ==
=== Top scorers ===
Rank	Player	Team	Goals
1	Nijo Gilbert	KSEB	8
1	Sajeesh E	Kerala Police	8
3	Babble Sivery	Kerala Police	6
4	Vishakh Mohanan	Golden Threads	5
4	Mahesh K	Real Malabar	5
4	Muhammed Bilal	Gokulam Kerala	5
6	Sreenath M	Wayanad United	4
6	Sreeraj K	KSEB	4
6	Aswin KV	Inter Kerala	4
6	Jamsheed Ali	Gokulam Kerala	4
6	Vivek KS	Inter Kerala	4
6	Antony K Paulose	Calicut	4
6	Nandu Krishna	Gokulam Kerala	4
6	Muhammed Minshan	EMEA College	4

=== Hat-tricks ===
Player	For	Against	Result	Date	Ref
Muhammed Minshan	EMEA College	Real Malabar	4-4	25 May 2026	

=== Clean sheets ===
No	Player	Club	Clean sheets
1	Muhammed Roshan	EMEA	4
1	Abhinav	Kerala Police	4
1	Bishorjit Singh	Calicut	4
1	Alkesh Raj	Golden Threads	4
1	Raysudheen	Gokulam Kerala	4
6	Muhammed Sinan	Real Malabar	3
6	Shehin Khan	KSEB	3
6	Muhammed Azhar	Kerala Police	3
9	Afthab Ashraf	PFC Kerala	2
9	Muhammed Anas	Calicut	2

== Season awards ==
Award	Winner	Team
Player of the league	(India) Arun Kumar D	Calicut
Golden boot	(India) Nijo Gilbert (India) Sajeesh E	KSEB; Kerala Police FC
Golden glove	(India) Raysudheen	Gokulam Kerala FC B
Best defender	(India) Ameen	Calicut
Fair Play Award		

== See also ==
- 2026–27 Indian State Leagues
- 2026 Durand Cup
