= Abdul Rabeeh =

Indian football player

Personal information
- Full name: Abdul Rabeeh Anjukandan
- Date of birth: 23 January 2001 (age 25)
- Place of birth: Malappuram, Kerala, India
- Height: 1.69 m (5 ft 7 in)
- Positions: Right winger; right-back

Team information
- Current team: NorthEast United
- Number: 7

Youth career
- 2013–2017: MSP FA
- 2017–2019: Bengaluru B

Senior career*
Years	Team	Apps	(Gls)
2019–2020	Kerala Blasters B	6	(0)
2020-2021	Luca Soccer Club		
2021–2025	Hyderabad	63	(0)
2025–2026	Goa	13	(0)
2026–	NorthEast United	5	(0)

International career^{‡}
2023–2024	India U23	8	(0)
- * Club domestic league appearances and goals as of 5 November 2026 ‡ National team caps and goals as of 15:44, 25 March 2024 (UTC)

Abdul Rabeeh Anjukandan (born 23 January 2001) is an Indian professional footballer who plays as a full-back for Indian Super League club NorthEast United.

== Club career ==
=== Early life and youth career ===
Born in Malappuram, Abdul started his youth career at MSP Higher Secondary School in 2013. He then moved to the under-16 team of Indian Super League club Bengaluru FC, where he represented the club in Elite Youth League. He then moved to the reserve side of Kerala Blasters FC in 2019, and featured for the club in the 2019–20 I-League 2nd Division season, and for the 2019–20 Kerala Premier League season, which they ended up as the champions.

=== Luca Soccer Club ===
In 2020, Abdul signed for the Kerala Premier League side Luca Soccer Club, where he spent the 2020–21 season. He then left the club in June 2021 for Hyderabad FC.

=== Hyderabad FC ===
On 22 June 2021, it was announced that Hyderabad FC has signed Abdul for the 2021–22 season. He was initially signed for their reserve squad, after being scouted by the club during his days at Luca SC. Abdul was included in the club's squad for the 2021 Durand Cup tournament, where he scored his debut goal in his debut game for the club on 12 September in their 5–0 win over Assam Rifles. Abdul, along with Mark Zothanpuia was then promoted to the senior team for 2021–22 Indian Super League season. He made his league debut on 23 December in the match against SC East Bengal as a substitute for Aniket Jadhav in the 83rd minute of the game, which ended in a 1–1 draw. He included in the playing 11 at first against Jamshedpur, which ended in a defeat in a 3–0 final score.

== Career statistics ==
=== Club ===
As of 22 October 2025

Club	Season	League			Cup		AFC		Total	
Club	Season	Division	Apps	Goals	Apps	Goals	Apps	Goals	Apps	Goals
Kerala Blasters B	2019–20	I-League 2nd Division	6	0	0	0	–		6	0
Hyderabad	2021–22	Indian Super League	3	0	3 (Note: Appearance(s) in Durand Cup)	1	–		6	1
Hyderabad	2022–23	Indian Super League	18	0	5 (Note: Appearance(s) in Super Cup)	1	1 (Note: Appearance in playoff for qualifier of AFC Cup)	0	24	1
Hyderabad	2023–24	Indian Super League	18	0	3	0	–		21	0
Hyderabad	2024–25	Indian Super League	24	0	1	0	–		25	0
Hyderabad	Total		63	0	12	2	1	0	76	3
Goa	2025–26	Indian Super League	0	0	0	0	3 (Note: Appearance(s) in AFC Cup)	0	3	0
Career total			69	0	12	2	4	0	85	3

== Honours ==
Kerala Blasters (R)

- Kerala Premier League: 2019–20

Hyderabad

- Indian Super League: 2021–22

India

- SAFF Championship: 2026
