= 2020–21 Kerala Premier League =

8th season of Kerala Premier League

Kerala Premier League
- Season: 2020–21
- Champions: Gokulam Kerala (2nd title)
- Matches: 33
- Goals: 96 (2.91 per match)
- Top goalscorer: (Mali) Saliou Guindo Gokulam Kerala FC(8)
- Highest scoring: Golden Threads FC 1-6 Kerala United FC Gokulam Kerala FC 5-2 FC Kerala
- Longest winning run: Gokulam Kerala FC (5)
- Longest unbeaten run: Gokulam Kerala FC (6)
- Longest winless run: Kovalam FC (5)
- Longest losing run: Kovalam FC (5)
- All statistics correct as of 16 April 2021.

The 2020–21 Kerala Premier League season was the eighth season of the Kerala Premier League. The season featured 12 teams which was divided into 2 groups and were played on a home-and-away format. The season was originally scheduled to start in 2020, but was postponed to 2021 due to COVID-19 pandemic. It began on 6 March 2021 across two centralised venues in Thrissur and Kochi. This season, Kerala Football Association decided to add two more participants into the league. KSEB and BASCO were the new entrants into the league.

== Teams ==
Locations of the 2020–21 Kerala Premier League teams

Team	Manager	Captain	Sponsor
Basco FC	Rajeev Kumar	Ummer farook	Royal Travels
FC Kerala	Shivaram	Shabin	Yogakshemam Loans
Gokulam Kerala FC	Najeeb	Rishad	Gokulam Group
Golden Threads	Walter A	Abhijith	Wayna Water
Kerala Blasters (R)	T. G Purushothaman	Shahajas Thekkan	Byju's
Kerala Police	I. M. Vijayan	Jimshad U	ODYSSIA
Kerala United FC	Shajirudheen Koppilan	Arjun Jayaraj	Micro Health Laboratories
Kovalam FC	Ebin Rose	Beniston	Federal Bank
KSEB	Ramesh PB	Sugun Kumar	MADRE Integrated Engineering
Luca Soccer Club	Navas Luca	Bala Dahir	Abreco freight
MA College	Haary Benny	Akhil K	Positive
Sports Academy Tirur	Baiju	Muhammad shibili	AB Bismi

== Foreign players ==
Clubs can sign maximum Three players two is allowed in the playing eleven.

Club	Player 1	Player 2	Player 3
Golden Threads FC	(Ghana) Joseph Tetteh	-	-
FC Kerala	-	-	-
Kerala United FC	(Ghana) Stephen Abeiku	(Ghana) Francis Dadzie	(Ghana) Aaron Awannorh
Gokulam Kerala FC	(Mali) Saliou Guindo	-	-
Kovalam FC	-	-	-
Luca Soccer Club	(Nigeria) Bala Dahir	(Ivory Coast) Koffi Konan Kevin	-
Sports Academy Tirur	-	-	-
Kerala Blasters (R)	-	-	-
MA College	-	-	-
Kerala Police	-	-	-
KSEB FC	-	-	-
Basco FC	-	-	-

== Group stage ==
=== Group A ===
Pos	Team	Pld	W	D	L	GF	GA	GD	Pts	Qualification
1	Gokulam Kerala F.C.	5	5	0	0	15	3	+12	15	Advance to Semi-finals
2	BASCO FC	5	1	3	1	7	5	+2	6	Advance to Semi-finals
3	Sports Academy Tirur	5	1	3	1	5	4	+1	6	
4	Kerala Police	5	1	3	1	4	6	−2	6	
5	Luca Soccer Club	5	1	2	2	5	4	+1	5	
6	FC Kerala	5	0	1	4	4	18	−14	1	

Source: KFA

==== Fixtures and results ====
Cancelled Matches

6 March 2021	Luca Soccer Club	3-0	FC Kerala	Thrissur
19:00 IST	Siddeq 50'; Bala Dahir 85'; Akbar 90+1'			Stadium: Thrissur Municipal Corporation Stadium

7 March 2021	Gokulam Kerala F.C.	3-0	Sports Academy Tirur	Thrissur
19:00 IST	Abhijith 23'; Ganeshan 47'; Saliou Guindo 67'			Stadium: Thrissur Municipal Corporation Stadium

13 March 2021	BASCO FC	0-0	Kerala Police	Thrissur
19:00 IST				Stadium: Thrissur Municipal Corporation Stadium

14 March 2021	Luca Soccer Club	0-0	Sports Academy Tirur	Thrissur
19:00 IST				Stadium: Thrissur Municipal Corporation Stadium

20 March 2021	Gokulam Kerala F.C.	5-2	FC Kerala	Thrissur
19:00 IST	Saliou Guindo 8', 25', 52', 83'; Fasalu Rahman 90'		Asif 51'; Abhishek 80'	Stadium: Thrissur Municipal Corporation Stadium

21 March 2021	Kerala Police	0-0	Sports Academy Tirur	Thrissur
19:00 IST				Stadium: Thrissur Municipal Corporation Stadium

27 March 2021	Gokulam Kerala F.C.	2-0	BASCO FC	Thrissur
19:00 IST	Ganesan 71'; Saliou Guindo 73'			Stadium: Thrissur Municipal Corporation Stadium

28 March 2021	Kerala Police	1-0	Luca Soccer Club	Thrissur
19:00 IST	Sanju G 69'			Stadium: Thrissur Municipal Corporation Stadium

3 April 2021	Gokulam Kerala F.C.	4-1	Kerala Police	Thrissur
19:00 IST	Gifty 23'; Saliou Guindo 88', 90'; Lalrinzuala 90+3'		Firoz 90+5'	Stadium: Thrissur Municipal Corporation Stadium

4 April 2021	FC Kerala	0-4	Sports Academy Tirur	Thrissur
19:00 IST			Muhammad Nisham 28' nasar 61'; 74', 80'	Stadium: Thrissur Municipal Corporation Stadium

10 April 2021	Luca Soccer Club	0-1	Gokulam Kerala F.C.	Thrissur
19:00 IST			Nimshad 86'	Stadium: Thrissur Municipal Corporation Stadium

11 April 2021	Sports Academy Tirur	1-1	BASCO FC	Thrissur
19:00 IST	adheeb 33'		Muhammad Shafi 80'	Stadium: Thrissur Municipal Corporation Stadium

13 April 2021	FC Kerala	2-2	Kerala Police	Thrissur
19:00 IST	Vinayak 24'; Rohit 90+1'		Bijesh Balan 39', 80'	Stadium: Thrissur Municipal Corporation Stadium

15 April 2021	Luca Soccer Club	2-2	BASCO FC	Thrissur
19:00 IST	Akmal Shan 22'; Bibin Boban 56'		Abdu Raheem 7'; Ajay Krishna 37'	Stadium: Thrissur Municipal Corporation Stadium

17 April 2021	BASCO FC	4-0	FC Kerala	Thrissur
19:00 IST	Abdu Raheem 11'; Muhammad Shafi 17', 47'; Ajay Krishna 39'			Stadium: Thrissur Municipal Corporation Stadium

=== Group B ===
Pos	Team	Pld	W	D	L	GF	GA	GD	Pts	Qualification
1	KSEB	5	4	0	1	10	3	+7	12	Advance to Semi-finals
2	Kerala United FC	5	4	0	1	16	5	+11	12	Advance to Semi-finals
3	MA College	5	3	1	1	8	5	+3	10	
4	Kerala Blasters FC Reserves	5	2	1	2	8	9	−1	7	
5	Golden Threads	5	1	0	4	3	12	−9	3	
6	Kovalam FC	5	0	0	5	2	13	−11	0	

Source: KFA

==== Fixtures and results ====
Cancelled Matches

6 March 2021	Kerala United FC	3-0	Kovalam FC	Kochi
16:00 IST	Bujair 60'; Mousoof 65'; Shafeer 71'			Stadium: Maharaja's College Stadium

7 March 2021	KSEB	0-1	MA College	Kochi
16:00 IST			Vyshak 39'	Stadium: Maharaja's College Stadium

13 March 2021	Kerala United FC	3-1	Kerala Blasters FC Reserves	Kochi
16:00 IST	Nidhin 42'; Bujair 45', 88'		Nihal 66'	Stadium: Maharaja's College Stadium

14 March 2021	Golden Threads	0-3	MA College	Kochi
16:00 IST			Fajil 8'; Rafi 16'; Junaid 45+1'	Stadium: Maharaja's College Stadium

20 March 2021	Golden Threads	2-0	Kovalam FC	Kochi
16:00 IST	Navin 24'; Anurag 66'			Stadium: Maharaja's College Stadium

21 March 2021	Kerala United FC	1-3	KSEB	Kochi
16:00 IST	Mousoof 21'		Muhammad parakottil 4', 42'; Jinesh Domenic 47'	Stadium: Maharaja's College Stadium

27 March 2021	MA College	1-1	Kerala Blasters FC Reserves	Kochi
16:00 IST	Muhammad fayis 73'		Sreekuttan 56'	Stadium: Maharaja's College Stadium

28 March 2021	Kovalam FC	0-1	KSEB	Kochi
16:00 IST			Muhammad parakottil 13'	Stadium: Maharaja's College Stadium

3 April 2021	Kerala United FC	3-0	MA College	Kochi
16:00 IST	Francis Dadzie 35', 73'; Muhammad jinshad 90+3'			Stadium: Maharaja's College Stadium

4 April 2021	Golden Threads	0-1	Kerala Blasters FC Reserves	Kochi
16:00 IST			Nihal Sudeesh 55'	Stadium: Maharaja's College Stadium

10 April 2021	Kovalam FC	1-3	MA College	Kochi
16:00 IST	Sherin 68'		Abil 45+1' jibin devassy 48'; Abhijith 90+2'	Stadium: Maharaja's College Stadium

11 April 2021	Golden Threads	0-2	KSEB	Kochi
16:00 IST			joanas 3' eldose 10'	Stadium: Maharaja's College Stadium

13 April 2021	Kerala Blasters FC Reserves	4-1	Kovalam FC	Kochi
16:00 IST	Sreekuttan 33'; Gobindash 60' surag chettri 75'; Asif 90+1'		Sherin 28'	Stadium: Maharaja's College Stadium

15 April 2021	Golden Threads	1-6	Kerala United FC	Kochi
16:00 IST	Rakesh 32'		Francis Dadzie 3'; Adarsh 45+2'; Bujair 53'; Hrishidath 68'; Alocious M 73'; Muhammad jinshad 90'	Stadium: Maharaja's College Stadium

17 April 2021	Kerala Blasters FC Reserves	1-4	KSEB	Kochi
16:00 IST	Naorem Mahesh Singh 90+4'		Nijo Gilbert 33'; Eldose George 40'; Vignesh 80'; Ajeesh 87'	Stadium: Maharaja's College Stadium

== Knockout stage ==
Semi-finals
B1	KSEB	3(5)
A2	BASCO FC	3(4)
A1	Gokulam Kerala F.C.	0(4)
B2	Kerala United FC	0(2)

Final
KSEB	1
Gokulam Kerala F.C.	2

=== Semi-finals ===
19 April 2021	KSEB	3-3 (5-4 p)	BASCO FC	Kochi
16:00 IST	Jacob 65', 84'; Nijo Gilbert 90'		Muhammad uvais 54' (o.g.); Muhammad Shafi 57'; Ajay Krishna 63'	Stadium: Maharaja's College Stadium
	Penalties
	Penalty scored		Penalty missed Penalty scored

19 April 2021	Gokulam Kerala F.C.	0-0 (4-2 p)	Kerala United FC	Thrissur
19:00 IST				Stadium: Thrissur Municipal Corporation Stadium
	Penalties
	Penalty scored		Penalty scored Penalty missed

=== Final ===
21 April 2021	KSEB	1-2	Gokulam Kerala F.C.	Kochi
15:45 IST	Viknesh 54'		Nishad roshan 80'; Ganeshan 92'	Stadium: Maharaja's College Stadium
