= 2022–23 Kerala Premier League qualification =

Football tournament

The 2022–23 Kerala Premier League Qualifiers were played from 25 September to 5 October. A total of eleven teams competed to decide the remaining 3 of 22 places in the 2022–23 Kerala Premier League. The fixtures were announced on 20 September.

== Teams ==
The following 11 teams (usually combination of district champions and lowest placed KPL teams previous season) entered the qualifying play-offs, consisting of four rounds:

- 6 teams entered in the preliminary round 1.
- 5 teams entered in the preliminary round 2.

	Team	Head coach	City	Sponsor
1	FC Kerala	(India) Britto Clemmi	Thrissur	Yogakshemam Loans
2	Kerala Blasters B	(Poland) Tomasz Tchórz	Kochi	Byju's
3	MA College	(India) Rajeev Palickal	Kothamangalam	Positive
4	Altius IFA	(India) Deepak Cherukudi Mattuvayil	Koppam	Aerius
5	Shooters United	(India) Ahamad Rasheed	Padne	
6	AFC Ambalavayal		Ambalavayal	
7	Aleppey XI FC		Alappuzha	
8	Payyannur College FC		Payyannur	
9	Sacred Heart		Thrissur	
10	Farook College FC		Feroke	
11	Byzantine Cochin		Ernakulam	

== Round 1 ==
25 September 2022
16:00

Payyannur College	5-1	Byzantine Cochin

Rajiv Gandhi Synthetic Stadium, Kasaragod
26 September 2022
16:00

Aleppey XI FC	1-6	Sacred Heart

Rajiv Gandhi Synthetic Stadium, Kasaragod
27 September 2022
16:00

AFC Ambalavayal	2-2	Shooters United
Penalties
	2–4

Rajiv Gandhi Synthetic Stadium, Kasaragod

== Round 2 ==
28 September 2022
16:00

Farook College	0-2	FC Kerala

Rajiv Gandhi Synthetic Stadium, Kasaragod
29 September 2022
16:00

AIFA	1-3	Payyannur College

Rajiv Gandhi Synthetic Stadium, Kasaragod
30 September 2022
16:00

Kerala Blasters B	1-0	Sacred Heart

Rajiv Gandhi Synthetic Stadium, Kasaragod
1 October 2022
16:00

MA College	0-1	Shooters United

Rajiv Gandhi Synthetic Stadium, Kasaragod

== Semi-finals ==
2 October 2022
16:00

FC Kerala	1-1	Payyannur College
Penalties
	3–5

Rajiv Gandhi Synthetic Stadium, Kasaragod
3 October 2022
16:00

Kerala Blasters B	4-0	Shooters United

Rajiv Gandhi Synthetic Stadium, Kasaragod

== Final ==
4 October 2022
16:00

Payyannur College	1-2	Kerala Blasters B

Rajiv Gandhi Synthetic Stadium, Kasaragod

== Loosers-final ==
5 October 2022
16:00

FC Kerala	6-1	Shooters United

Rajiv Gandhi Synthetic Stadium, Kasaragod

== Goalscorers ==
There were 41 goals scored in 11 matches, for an average of 3.73 goals per match.

5 goals

- (Nigeria) Charles Offei (FC Kerala)

4 goals

- (India) Sreeraj (Payyannur College)

2 goals

- (India) Roshan Gigi (Kerala Blasters B)
- (India) Basith (Kerala Blasters B)
- (India) Akash Ravi (Payyannur College)
- (India) Sanjay (Sacred Heart)
- (India) Manaf (AFC Ambalavayal)

1 goal

- (India) Sanalraj (Payyannur College)
- (India) Krishnaraj (Payyannur College)
- (India) Dilshad (Payyannur College)
- (India) Anurag (Payyannur College)
- (India) Bijesh (Shooters United)
- (India) Akshay (Shooters United)
- (India) Rizwan (Shooters United)
- (India) Jyothish (Shooters United)
- (India) Bibin (FC Kerala)
- (India) Abhishek (FC Kerala)
- (India) Yadhu Krishnan (FC Kerala)
- (India) Akhil (FC Kerala)
- (India) Manoj (Sacred Heart)
- (India) Shamnad (Sacred Heart)
- (India) Vishnu (Sacred Heart)
- (India) Azarudhin (Kerala Blasters B)
- (India) Ajsal (Kerala Blasters B)
- (India) Alkesh (Kerala Blasters B)
- (India) Sachu (Byzantine Cochin)
- (India) Sajith (Aleppey XI)
- (India) Shadil (AIFA)
