= 2016–17 Kerala Premier League =

4th season of Kerala Premier League

Kerala Premier League
- Season: 2016–17 (4th Season)
- Champions: KSEB (1st title)
- Promoted: FC Kerala
- Matches: 45
- Goals: 126 (2.8 per match)
- Top goalscorer: (India) Firos Kalathingal (7 goals)
- Biggest home win: Gokulam FC 7–0 Cochin Port Trust (20 May 2017)
- Biggest away win: KSEB 0–5 Gokulam FC (10 May 2017)
- Highest scoring: FC Kerala 5–3 Cochin Port Trust (30 April 2017)
- Longest winning run: FC Thrissur; SBI Kerala (3 games)
- Longest unbeaten run: FC Thrissur (6 games)
- Longest winless run: SBI Kerala (7 games)
- Longest losing run: Accountant General Office (4 games)
- All statistics correct as of 1 June 2017.

The 2016–17 Kerala Premier League Season was the fourth season of the Kerala Premier League. Unlike last 3 seasons, the season featured 11 teams which were divided into 2 groups with Group A having 5 and Group B having 6 teams and wes played on a home-and-away format with half of the teams being private clubs. Later Quartz SC announced its withdrawal from the league making the number of teams 10. The season kicked off on 8 April 2017. KSEB beat FC Thrissur in the finals to clinch their maiden Kerala Premier League title.

== Teams ==
Locations of the 2016–17 Kerala Premier League teams

It featured 11 teams from Kerala affiliated to the KFA competing for the Trophy. The league is played in a home and away format for the first time. Three points are awarded for a win, one for a draw and zero for a loss. At the end of the season a table of the final League standings is determined, based on the following criteria in this order: points obtained, goal difference, and goals scored.

"We have eight confirmed teams and four are private clubs: Gokulam FC (Manjeri), Quartz (Kozhikode), FC Thrissur, FC Kerala (also from Thrissur), One more club, SAT from Tirur, is likely to be included which could make it five private clubs this time."

— P. Anilkumar, the Kerala Football Association secretary, on 24 January 2017

=== Stadiums and locations ===
Team	Stadium	Capacity
Central Excise	Ambedkar Stadium, Ernakulam	10,000
Cochin Port Trust	Ambedkar Stadium, Ernakulam	10,000
FC Kerala	Thrissur Municipal Corporation Stadium	15,000
FC Thrissur	Thrissur Municipal Corporation Stadium	15,000
Gokulam FC	Kottappadi Football Stadium, Malappuram	10,000
Kerala Police	Kottappadi Football Stadium, Malappuram	10,000
Sports Academy Tirur	Rajiv Gandhi Municipal Stadium, Tirur	–
KSEB	Chandrasekharan Nair Stadium	25,000
SBI Kerala	Chandrasekharan Nair Stadium	25,000
Accountant General Office	University Stadium (Thiruvananthapuram)	20,000
Quartz SC ^{w}	EMS Stadium	85,000

^{w} Withdrawn

== Results ==
=== League table ===
==== Group A ====
Pos	Team	Pld	W	D	L	GF	GA	GD	Pts	Qualification
1	Gokulam FC	6	4	0	2	18	5	+13	12	Advance to Semi-finals
2	KSEB	6	3	2	1	9	9	0	11	Advance to Semi-finals
3	FC Kerala	6	3	1	2	11	9	+2	10	
4	Cochin Port Trust	6	0	1	5	9	24	−15	1	
5	Quartz SC	0	0	0	0	0	0	0	0	Withdrawn from the League

==== Group B ====
Pos	Team	Pld	W	D	L	GF	GA	GD	Pts	Qualification
1	Sports Academy Tirur	10	6	2	2	15	8	+7	20	Advance to Semi-finals
2	FC Thrissur	10	5	3	2	16	11	+5	18	Advance to Semi-finals
3	Kerala Police	10	5	2	3	13	8	+5	17	
4	SBI Kerala	10	3	4	3	9	8	+1	13	
5	Accountant General Office	10	2	2	6	11	21	−10	8	
6	Central Excise	10	2	1	7	9	17	−8	7	

=== Knockout stage ===
Semi-finals
A1	Gokulam FC	0 (5)
B2	FC Thrissur	0 (6)
A2	KSEB	0 (4)
B1	Sports Academy Tirur	0 (1)

Final
FC Thrissur	2
KSEB	4

=== Fixtures and results ===
Cancelled Matches

8 April 2017	Sports Academy Tirur	2–1	FC Thrissur	Tirur
19:30 IST	Muhammed Shibili 36'; Fasalu Rahman 56'	Report	S Rajesh 82'	Stadium: Rajiv Gandhi Municipal Stadium; Attendance: –

9 April 2017	FC Kerala	1–2	KSEB	Thrissur
16:00 IST	Ubaid 90+'	Report	Uvais 32' (o.g.); 90+' (o.g.)	Stadium: Thrissur Municipal Corporation Stadium; Attendance: –

13 April 2017	Cochin Port Trust	1–4	Gokulam FC	Ernakulam
16:00 IST	Sylla Sulaiman 78'	Report	Shihad 14'; Pritam Sarkar 46'; Arif Javed Sheikh 76'; VP Suhair 90+'	Stadium: Ambedkar Stadium; Attendance: –

13 April 2017	FC Thrissur	2–1	Central Excise	Thrissur
16:00 IST	Ashik 21'; S Rajesh 87'	Report	Shehanaz 45+'	Stadium: Thrissur Municipal Corporation Stadium; Attendance: –

15 April 2017	Kerala Police	0–2	FC Thrissur	Malappuram
19:00 IST		Report	Ashik 25'; Ashar 40'	Stadium: Kottappadi Football Stadium; Attendance: –

16 April 2017	SBI Kerala	0–0	Sports Academy Tirur	Thiruvananthapuram
16:00 IST		Report		Stadium: Chandrasekharan Nair Stadium; Attendance: –

19 April 2017	FC Kerala	9–0	Quartz SC	Thrissur
16:00 IST	Jerry 4' (o.g.); Uvais 7'; Bala 10'; Ubaid 39'; Bineesh 50' 70' 78'; Anoop 60'; Harikrishnan 86'	Report		Stadium: Thrissur Municipal Corporation Stadium; Attendance: –

19 April 2017	Accountant General Office	2–1	Sports Academy Tirur	Thiruvananthapuram
16:00 IST	Nazarudeen 63'; Y Dany 90+'	Report	Shaheed 24'	Stadium: University Stadium (Thiruvananthapuram); Attendance: –

19 April 2017	Kerala Police	2–0	Central Excise	Malappuram
19:00 IST	Jimshad 17'; Firos Kalathingal 46'	Report		Stadium: Kottappadi Football Stadium; Attendance: –

22 April 2017	Kerala Police	2–0	Accountant General Office	Malappuram
19:00 IST	Aneesh 45'; Jimmy 85'	Report		Stadium: Kottappadi Football Stadium; Attendance: –

23 April 2017	Gokulam FC	5–0	Quartz SC	Malappuram
19:00 IST	VP Suhair 10' 29'; Francis 17'; Mohammed Salim 61' 75'	Report		Stadium: Kottappadi Football Stadium; Attendance: –

23 April 2017	Central Excise	0–1	FC Thrissur	Ernakulam
16:00 IST		Report	S Rajesh 90'	Stadium: Ambedkar Stadium; Attendance: –

26 April 2017	Sports Academy Tirur	3–0	Accountant General Office	Tirur
16:00 IST	Atsushi Yonezawa 4' 53'; Shaheed 16'	Report		Stadium: Rajiv Gandhi Municipal Stadium; Attendance: –

26 April 2017	Gokulam FC	1–2	KSEB	Malappuram
19:00 IST	VP Suhair 67'	Report	Alex 17'; Rakesh 87'	Stadium: Kottappadi Football Stadium; Attendance: –

29 April 2017	FC Thrissur	1–1	Kerala Police	Thrissur
16:00 IST	S Rajesh (-)	Report	Firos Kalathingal (-)	Stadium: Thrissur Municipal Corporation Stadium; Attendance: –

29 April 2017	SBI Kerala	0–0	Accountant General Office	Thiruvananthapuram
16:00 IST		Report		Stadium: Chandrasekharan Nair Stadium; Attendance: –

30 April 2017	FC Kerala	5–3	Cochin Port Trust	Thrissur
16:00 IST	Sadhik 28'; Bineesh 53' 54' 80'; Jithin 90'	Report	Sylla Sulaiman 32' 86'; Assaku Aqua Effiong 36'	Stadium: Thrissur Municipal Corporation Stadium; Attendance: –

1 May 2017	Sports Academy Tirur	2–0	Kerala Police	Tirur
16:00 IST	Shaheed 85' 90+'	Report		Stadium: Rajiv Gandhi Municipal Stadium; Attendance: –

1 May 2017	Central Excise	3–2	SBI Kerala	Ernakulam
16:00 IST	Askar (-) (-); Muhammed Rafi (-)	Report	Sajith Poulose (-); Prasoon (-)	Stadium: Ambedkar Stadium; Attendance: –

3 May 2017	Gokulam FC	2–0	FC Kerala	Malappuram
19:00 IST	Bello Razaq 49'; Arif Javed Sheikh 90+'	Report		Stadium: Kottappadi Football Stadium; Attendance: –

5 May 2017	Cochin Port Trust	2–2	KSEB	Ernakulam
16:00 IST	Sylla Sulaiman 60'; Assaku Aqua Effiong 67'	Report	Muhammed Parakkottil 50' 59'	Stadium: Ambedkar Stadium; Attendance: –

7 May 2017	FC Thrissur	2–2	SBI Kerala	Thrissur
16:00 IST	Jasir 53'; Antony Poulose 76'	Report	Shaijumon 51'; Jijo Joseph 88'	Stadium: Thrissur Municipal Corporation Stadium; Attendance: –

8 May 2017	Kerala Police	2–0	Central Excise	Malappuram
19:00 IST	Bibin Thomas 44'; Firos Kalathingal 78'	Report		Stadium: Kottappadi Football Stadium; Attendance: –

10 May 2017	Quartz SC	0–8	FC Kerala	Kozhikkode
16:00 IST		Report	Harikrishnan 16' 32'; Jithin 36' 72' 88'; Jerrybie Kelechi 48'; Bala 84'; Ubaid 90+'	Stadium: EMS Stadium; Attendance: –

10 May 2017	SBI Kerala	0–0	FC Thrissur	Thiruvananthapuram
16:00 IST		Report		Stadium: Chandrasekharan Nair Stadium; Attendance: –

10 May 2017	KSEB	0–4	Gokulam FC	Thiruvananthapuram
19:30 IST		Report	VP Suhair 5' 24'; Mohammed Rashid 82'; Mohammed Salim 85'	Stadium: Chandrasekharan Nair Stadium; Attendance: –

10 May 2017	Kerala Police	1–1	Sports Academy Tirur	Malappuram
19:30 IST	Rahul 12'	Report	Irshad 70'	Stadium: Kottappadi Football Stadium; Attendance: –

13 May 2017	Accountant General Office	3–1	FC Thrissur	Thiruvananthapuram
16:00 IST	Kannan 38'; Midhun 42' 78'	Report	Ozowara CE 4'	Stadium: University Stadium (Thiruvananthapuram); Attendance: –

14 May 2017	Sports Academy Tirur	2–0	Central Excise	Tirur
16:00 IST	Shaheed 32'; Unais 86'	Report		Stadium: Rajiv Gandhi Municipal Stadium; Attendance: –

14 May 2017	FC Kerala	2–0	Gokulam FC	Thrissur
16:00 IST	EC Lucky 34'; Jerrybie Kelechi 42'	Report		Stadium: Thrissur Municipal Corporation Stadium; Attendance: –

14 May 2017	Kerala Police	1–0	SBI Kerala	Malappuram
16:00 IST	Firos Kalathingal 25'			Stadium: Kottappadi Football Stadium; Attendance: –

17 May 2017	KSEB	0–0	FC Kerala	Thiruvananthapuram
16:00 IST		Report		Stadium: Chandrasekharan Nair Stadium; Attendance: –

17 May 2017	FC Thrissur	3–1	Accountant General Office	Thrissur
16:00 IST	Ozowara CE 25' 49' 65'	Report	Dany Y 15'	Stadium: Thrissur Municipal Corporation Stadium; Attendance: –

17 May 2017	Sports Academy Tirur	1–0	SBI Kerala	Tirur
16:00 IST	Fasalu Rahman 67'	Report		Stadium: Rajiv Gandhi Municipal Stadium; Attendance: –

19 May 2017	Accountant General Office	1–2	Central Excise	Thiruvananthapuram
16:00 IST				Stadium: University Stadium (Thiruvananthapuram); Attendance: –

20 May 2017	FC Thrissur	3–1	Sports Academy Tirur	Thrissur
16:00 IST	Haseeb 13'; Ozowara CE 90+'; Somi 90+'	Report	Shibili 33' (pen.)	Stadium: Thrissur Municipal Corporation Stadium; Attendance: –

20 May 2017	Gokulam FC	7–0	Cochin Port Trust	Malappuram
19:30 IST	Francis Xavier 35'; Muhammed Salim 47'; VP Suhair 52'; Arif Javed Shaikh 53'; Bright Mendes 57'; Sushanth Mathew 63'; Shihad 83'	Report		Stadium: Kottappadi Football Stadium; Attendance: –

21 May 2017	SBI Kerala	1–0	Central Excise	Thiruvananthapuram
16:00 IST	Aslam Jr. 44'			Stadium: Chandrasekharan Nair Stadium; Attendance: –

22 May 2017	Accountant General Office	1–4	Kerala Police	Thiruvananthapuram
16:00 IST	Febindas 48'		KP Jimshad 50' (pen.); Firos Kalathingal 51' 66' 76'	Stadium: University Stadium (Thiruvananthapuram); Attendance: –

23 May 2017	Cochin Port Trust	2–3	FC Kerala	Ernakulam
16:00 IST	Assaku Aqua Efiong 31'; Sylla Sulaiman 47'		Mousoof Naizan 68' 90'; Jithin MS 90+'	Stadium: Ambedkar Stadium; Attendance: –

24 May 2017	Central Excise	1–2	Sports Academy Tirur	Ernakulam
16:00 IST	Melvino Fernandez 44'	Report	Fasalu Rehman 27'; Shaheed 67'	Stadium: Ambedkar Stadium; Attendance: –

24 May 2017	Accountant General Office	1–3	SBI Kerala	Thiruvananthapuram
16:00 IST	Manu 34'	Report	Aslam Sr. 25'; Jijo Joseph 67'; Shaijumon 70'	Stadium: University Stadium (Thiruvananthapuram); Attendance: –

25 May 2017	KSEB	3–1	Cochin Port Trust	Thiruvananthapuram
16:00 IST	Joby Justin (-); Sajeer Khan (-) (-)	Report	Assaku Aqua Efiong (-)	Stadium: Chandrasekharan Nair Stadium; Attendance: –

26 May 2017	Central Excise	2–2	Accountant General Office	Ernakulam
16:00 IST	Muneer (-); Balu P Maani (-)		Jipson Justus (-); Manuprasad (-)	Stadium: Ambedkar Stadium; Attendance: –

27 May 2017	SBI Kerala	1–0	Kerala Police	Thiruvananthapuram
16:00 IST	Sajith Poulose 82'	Report		Stadium: Chandrasekharan Nair Stadium; Attendance: –

Semi-finals

29 May 2017	Sports Academy Tirur	0–0 (1–4 p)	KSEB	Tirur
16:00 IST		Report		Stadium: Rajiv Gandhi Municipal Stadium; Attendance: –
	Penalties
	Irshad (penalty missed); Shafeek (penalty missed); Rahil (penalty scored)		Joby Justin (penalty scored); Franicis (penalty scored); Surjith (penalty scored); Alex (penalty scored)

29 May 2017	FC Thrissur	0–0 (6–5 p)	Gokulam FC	Thrissur
16:00 IST		Report		Stadium: Thrissur Municipal Corporation Stadium; Attendance: –
	Penalties
	Akhil (penalty missed); Somi P T (penalty scored); Saneesh VP (penalty scored); S Rajesh (penalty scored); Ozowara CE (penalty missed); Sebin Varghese (penalty scored); Haseeb KV (penalty scored); Ashique (penalty scored)		Arif Javed Shaikh (penalty scored); Bello Razaq (penalty scored); Sushanth Mathew (penalty missed); Myron Mendez (penalty scored); Noushad (penalty missed); Mohammed Salim (penalty scored); Bijesh Balan (penalty scored); Francis Xaviour (penalty missed)

Final

31 May 2017	FC Thrissur	2–4	KSEB	Thrissur
21:30 IST	Somi PT 24'; S Rajesh 75'	Report	Alex 29'; Joby Justin 32'; Sajeer Khan 66'; Mohammad Safwan 80'	Stadium: Thrissur Municipal Corporation Stadium; Attendance: –

== Season statistics ==
As of 1 June 2017

=== Top scorers ===
Rank	Player	Club	Goals
1	(India) Firos Kalathingal	Kerala Police	7
2	(India) Shaheed	Sports Academy Tirur	6
3	(Nigeria) Ozowara CE	FC Thrissur	5
3	(India) S Rajesh	FC Thrissur	5
3	(Guinea) Sylla Sulaiman	Cochin Port Trust	5
3	(India) VP Suhair	Gokulam FC	5

=== Hat-tricks ===
Player	For	Against	Result	Date	Ref
(India) Bineesh Balan	FC Kerala	Cochin Port Trust	5–3	30 April 2017	
(Nigeria) Ozowara CE	FC Thrissur	Accountant General Office	3–1	17 May 2017	
(India) Firos Kalathingal	Kerala Police	Accountant General Office	4–1	22 May 2017	–

=== Season awards ===
Award	Recipient
Most Valuable Player	Shaheed (Sports Academy Tirur)
Fairplay award	FC Kerala
