= Saliou Guindo =

Malian footballer (born 1996)

Personal information
- Date of birth: 12 September 1996 (age 30)
- Place of birth: Ségou, Mali
- Height: 1.84 m (6 ft 0 in)
- Position: Forward

Team information
- Current team: Thanh Hoa
- Number: 9

Senior career*
Years	Team	Apps	(Gls)
2011–2013	Jeanne d'Arc		
2013–2014	Bamako		
2014–2015	ASEC Mimosas		
2015–2017	Espérance Tunis	1	(0)
2017–2018	Al-Ahli		
2018–2019	Skënderbeu Korçë	5	(0)
2019	→ Bylis Ballsh (loan)	10	(8)
2019–2020	Bylis Ballsh	26	(10)
2020	Ankara Keçiörengücü	0	(0)
2020	Gokulam Kerala FC	0	(0)
2021	Gokulam Kerala FC B	7	(8)
2021–2022	KF Laçi	34	(19)
2022	Dibba Al Fujairah	8	(0)
2023	→ KF Laçi (loan)	12	(9)
2023–2024	Maccabi Petah Tikva	22	(4)
2024–2025	Lamia	10	(0)
2025	Egnatia	15	(1)
2025–2026	Dinamo City	29	(4)
2026–	Thanh Hoa	2	(2)

International career^{‡}
2015	Mali U20	7	(0)
2022	Mali	1	(0)
- * Club domestic league appearances and goals as of 12 September 2026 ‡ National team caps and goals as of 25 March 2022

Saliou Guindo (born 12 September 1996) is a Malian professional footballer who plays as a forward for V.League 1 club Thanh Hoa.

== Club career ==
Guindo began his professional club career at Jeanne d'Arc FC in 2014 and played until 2015. He later signed with ASEC Mimosas in the Ligue 1 (Ivory Coast).

In 2015, he moved to Tunisian side Espérance Sportive de Tunis. He also appeared in four CAF Confederation Cup matches with Espérance. Guindo later played for Kategoria Superiore side Skënderbeu Korçë from 2018 to 2019.

In the 2017–18 season, he featured for Al-Ahli Manama in the Bahrain top flight and Albanian club KF Skënderbeu then came calling in the season that followed. Between 2018 and 2020, the striker featured for them and later Byllis Ballsh in the Albanian first division, before he was signed by the Turkish tier two club Ankara Keciörengücü.

Domestically he also played in another Kategoria Superiore side FK Byllis Ballsh. In the 2019–20 Kategoria Superiore, he emerged as the top scorer with 11 goals and 3 assists for FK Byllis Ballsh. It was Guindo's best performance so far.

In 2020, he went to Turkey and signed a three-year contract with TFF First League outfit Ankara Keçiörengücü but did not appear in league games.

On 21 November 2020, it was announced that Guindo had signed for I-League outfit Gokulam Kerala.

Guindo joined Albanian club KF Laçi in the summer of 2021.

Guindo signed a two-year contract with Dibba Al Fujairah on 14 August 2022.

Guindo joined Maccabi Petah Tikva on 9 July 2023. On 30 May 2024, he won his first title with the club, Israel State Cup, after beating Hapoel Be'er Sheva 1–0 in the final.

On 1 August 2024, Guindo joined Super League Greece club Lamia.

On 5 September 2026, Guindo moved to Vietnam, signing for V.League 1 club Thanh Hoa.

== International career ==
Born in a town named Ségou, Guindo represented his country at the FIFA U20 World Cup in 2015, where they secured the 3rd position.

Guindo was eyeing to win the tournament for making Mali proud around the world. In his words, "It's our dream to win this competition." Guindo added : "Our country would be known around the world. Many countries don't know about us and many people sometimes ask us, 'what's Mali?'"

He has also represented his nation in 2015 Africa U-20 Cup of Nations, where they finished 4th. Guindo was the man behind his country's qualification in the tournament.

Guindo was called up in the squad of Mali national team in 2020 but he is still searching his debut match for the senior team. He debuted with Mali in a 1–0 2022 World Cup qualification loss to Tunisia on 25 March 2022.

== Career statistics ==
=== Club ===
As of 6 May 2024

Appearances and goals by club, season and competition
Club	Season	League			Cup		Continental		Other		Total	
Club	Season	Division	Apps	Goals	Apps	Goals	Apps	Goals	Apps	Goals	Apps	Goals
Espérance Tunis	2015–16	Ligue 1	1	0	1	1	–		0	0	2	1
Skënderbeu Korçë	2018–19	Albanian Superliga	5	0	2 (Note: Appearances in the Albanian Cup)	1	–		0	0	7	1
KF Bylis	2019–20	Kategoria Superiore	36	18	4	1	–		0	0	40	19
Gokulam Kerala	2020–21	I-League	0	0	2 (Note: Appearances in the IFA Shield)	1	0	0	0	0	2	1
Laçi	2021–22	Kategoria Superiore	34	19	7	3	6	0	0	0	47	22
Dibba Al Fujairah	2021–22	UAE Pro League	8	0	2 (Note: Appearances in the UAE President's Cup)	0	0	0	0	0	10	0
Laçi	2022–23	Kategoria Superiore	18	11	2	0	4	0	0	0	24	11
Maccabi Petah Tikva	2023–24	Kategoria Superiore	22	4	1 (Note: Appearances in the Israel State Cup)	1	0	0	0	0	23	5
Career total			124	52	21	8	10	0	0	0	155	60

== Honours ==
Espérance Tunis

- Tunisian Ligue Professionnelle 1: 2016–17, 2017–18

KF Bylis

- Kategoria e Parë: 2018–19

Gokulam Kerala

- Kerala Premier League: 2021–21

Maccabi Petah Tikva

- Israel State Cup: 2023–24

Egnatia

- Kategoria Superiore: 2024–25
- Kupa e Shqipërisë runner-up: 2024–25

Mali U20

- FIFA U-20 World Cup third place: 2015
- African U-20 Championship fourth place: 2015

Individual

- Kerala Premier League top scorer: 2020–21 (with 8 goals)
- Kategoria Superiore top scorer: 2021–22 (with 19 goals)

== See also ==
- List of Malian expatriate footballers
