= 2015–16 Kerala Premier League =

3rd season of Kerala Premier League

Kerala Premier League
- Season: 2015–16 (3rd Season)
- Country: India
- Teams: 8
- Champions: State Bank of Travancore (2nd title)
- Matches: 15
- Goals: 46 (3.07 per match)
- Top goalscorer: Askar (Central Excise) (6 goals)
- Highest scoring: FC Kerala 2–5 AGS Office (16 April 2016)

Women's Kerala Premier League
- Season: 2015–16 (2nd Season)
- Country: India
- Teams: 4
- Champions: Marthoma College WFC (1st title)
- Matches: 6
- Goals: 18 (3 per match)
- Top goalscorer: Subitha (Marthoma College WFC); Dhanya (Marthoma College WFC); Aswathy (Quartz WFC) (3 goals each)
- Highest scoring: Quartz WFC 4–0 Dinesh SWC (19 April 2016)

The 2015–16 Kerala Premier League Season, Officially known as 3rd Dentcare Dental Lab Kerala Premier League due to sponsorship reasons, was the third season of the Kerala Premier League, a professional football league played in Kerala since 2013–14. Muvattupuzha Football Club Host the third Season. Muvattupuzha Municipal Stadium was the venue. The season featured 8 teams in men's edition and 4 teams in women's edition. The season kicked off on 16 April 2016. Marthoma College Women's Football Club emerged as the winners of the women's edition and remained unbeaten in the league. SBT beat Central Excise for 1–0 in the finals to clinch the Kerala Premier League title for the consecutive time.

== Sponsorship ==
Ramco Cements was the sponsors of the first 2 seasons. For the 3rd Edition Dentcare Dental Lab Pvt. Ltd. came in as the sponsor of the League.

== Men's ==
=== Structure ===
It featured the best eight teams of Kerala affiliated to the KFA competing for the Trophy. The league is played in a two single format where the teams were divided into 2 groups of 4 Teams each. Matches were hosted by Muvattupuzha Football Club and were played in Muvattupuzha Municipal Stadium. Top 2 teams from each group qualified for the semifinals. Three points are awarded for a win, one for a draw and zero for a loss. At the end of the season a table of the final League standings is determined, based on the following criteria in this order: points obtained, goal difference, and goals scored.

=== Teams ===
This is the completed club list for the 2015–16 season.

Group A	Group B
Kerala Police	KSEB, Trivandrum
FC Kerala	State Bank of Travancore
AG's Office Thiruvananthapuram	Kerala XI
Central Excise, Kochi	Cochin Port Trust

=== Group stage ===
Group A

Pos	Team	Pld	W	D	L	GF	GA	GD	Pts	Qualification
1	Central Excise	3	3	0	0	12	4	+8	9	Advance to Semi-finals
2	AGS Office	3	2	0	1	7	7	0	6	Advance to Semi-finals
3	Kerala Police	3	1	0	2	4	6	−2	3	
4	FC Kerala	3	0	0	3	4	10	−6	0	

Group B

Pos	Team	Pld	W	D	L	GF	GA	GD	Pts	Qualification
1	State Bank of Travancore	3	2	0	1	6	2	+4	6	Advance to Semi-finals
2	KSEB	3	2	0	1	5	1	+4	6	Advance to Semi-finals
3	Kerala XI	3	2	0	1	4	4	0	6	
4	Cochin Port Trust	3	0	0	3	0	8	−8	0	

Rules for classification: 1) points; 2) goal difference; 3) goals scored; 4) head-to-head result.

=== Knockout stage ===
Semi-finals
A1	(India) Central Excise	1 (4)
B2	(India) KSEB	1 (3)
A2	(India) AGS Office	0
B1	(India) State Bank of Travancore	1

Final
(India) Central Excise	0
(India) State Bank of Travancore	1

=== Matches ===
16 April 2016

FC Kerala	2–5	AGS Office
Surjith VR 30' 37'		Jipson 17' 89'; Midhun Wilwet 19' 78'; Akhil 48'

Municipal Stadium, Muvattupuzha
17 April 2016

Central Excise	3–1	FC Kerala
Muneer 18'; Mhd. Rafi 41'; Askar 47'		Surjith V R 22'

Municipal Stadium, Muvattupuzha
18 April 2016

Kerala Police	0–1	AGS Office
		Nazarudeen 52'

Municipal Stadium, Muvattupuzha
19 April 2016

AGS Office	1–5	Central Excise
Jipson 50'		Askar 24' 71'; Adheep 45+1' 75'; Muneer 59'

Municipal Stadium, Muvattupuzha
20 April 2016

Central Excise	4–2	Kerala Police
Askar 6' 53' 78'; Shahabas 87'		Prasanth Kumar 28'; Anish 65'

Municipal Stadium, Muvattupuzha
21 April 2016

FC Kerala	1–2	Kerala Police
Sreyas 8'		Sreerag 26'; Rahul 81'

Municipal Stadium, Muvattupuzha
22 April 2016

Cochin Port Trust	0–3	Kerala XI
		Mhd.Asif 23'; Nibin Joseph 44'; Bijesh Balan 88'

Municipal Stadium, Muvattupuzha
23 April 2016

State Bank Of Travancore	2–0	Cochin Port Trust
Shaijumon 55'; Martin John 65' (pen.)

Municipal Stadium, Muvattupuzha
24 April 2016

KSEB	0–1	Kerala XI
		Thahir Zaman 56'

Municipal Stadium, Muvattupuzha
25 April 2016

SBT	0–2	KSEB
		Vishak 40'; Sarfan 90+4'

Municipal Stadium, Muvattupuzha
26 April 2016

Kerala XI	0–4	SBT
		Usman 38'; Sajith Poulose 51'; Prasoon 53'; Shibin Lal 64'

Municipal Stadium, Muvattupuzha
27 April 2016

Cochin Port Trust	0–3	KSEB
		Alex M 44' 84'; Sarfan 56'

Municipal Stadium, Muvattupuzha

Semi-Finals

29 April 2016

Central Excise	1–1	KSEB
Rafi 13'		Nandu 54'
Penalties
	4–3

Municipal Stadium, Muvattupuzha
30 April 2016

SBT	1–0	AGS Office
Usman 30'

Municipal Stadium, Muvattupuzha

Final

1 May 2016

Central Excise	0–1	SBT
		Usman 45+2'

Municipal Stadium, Muvattupuzha

== Women's ==
=== Structure ===
It features four women's club teams from Kerala. All teams face each other once. Three points are awarded for a win, one for a draw and zero for a loss. At the end of the season a table of the final League standings is determined, based on the following criteria in this order: points obtained, goal difference, and goals scored.

=== Teams ===
This is the completed club list for the 2015–16 season.

Team
Marthoma College Women's FC, Thiruvalla
Quartz Women's FC Kozhikkode
Dinesh Soccer Women's Club, Kottayam
Alleppey Women's FC

=== League table ===
Pos	Team	Pld	W	D	L	GF	GA	GD	Pts
1	Marthoma College WFC	3	3	0	0	9	1	+8	9
2	Quartz WFC	3	2	0	1	6	4	+2	6
3	Dinesh Soccer Womens Club	3	1	0	2	2	8	−6	3
4	Alleppey WFC	3	0	0	3	1	5	−4	0

Rules for classification: 1) points; 2) goal difference; 3) goals scored; 4) head-to-head result.

=== Matches ===
17 April 2016

Dinesh SWC	0–4	Marthoma College WFC
		Subitha 25' 30'; Aswathy 34'; Dhanya 48'

Municipal Stadium, Muvattupuzha
18 April 2016

Alleppey WFC	0–2	Quartz WFC
		Ashly 41'; Aswathy 73'

Municipal Stadium, Muvattupuzha
19 April 2016

Quartz WFC	4–1	Dinesh SWC
Aswathy 14' 70'; Sithara 20'; Anjali T 54'		Leena Roy 78'

Municipal Stadium, Muvattupuzha
20 April 2016

Alleppey WFC	1–2	Marthoma College WFC
Reshma 53'		Dhanya 25' 37'

Municipal Stadium, Muvattupuzha
21 April 2016

Dinesh SWC	1–0	Alleppey WFC
Anuja MS 57'

Municipal Stadium, Muvattupuzha
22 April 2016

Quartz WFC	0–3	Marthoma College WFC
		Subitha Poovatta 3'; Sujithra 9' 80'

Municipal Stadium, Muvattupuzha
