= ICL Fincorp =

Indian non-banking financial company

- Industry: Non-banking financial company
- Founded: 1991
- Founder: Adv K G Anilkumar
- Headquarters: Irinjalakuda, Thrissur, Kerala, India
- Key people: Adv K G Anilkumar (CMD); Uma Anilkumar (Whole time director & CEO)
- Services: Gold Loans; Home insurance; Vehicle Loan
- Website: https://www.iclfincorp.com/

ICL Fincorp Ltd is an Indian non-banking financial company headquartered in Irinjalakuda, Thrissur, Kerala. Established in 1991 as Irinjalakuda Credits & Leasing Company, ICL Fincorp has 350+ branches spanning Kerala, Tamil Nadu, Karnataka, Andhra Pradesh, Telangana, Maharashtra, and Odisha.

== History ==
Founded by K. G. Anil Kumar, Chairman and Managing Director, along with Uma Anilkumar, CEO & Whole-time Director in 1991. Major services are gold loans, business loans, vehicle loans, and insurance. In FY 2019–2020, ICL Fincorp acquired Salem Erode Investments, a BSE-listed company, by holding 74.27% stake in the promoter group of the company.

Dr. M. N. Gunavardhan, former Alappuzha district collector, and Dr. Rajashree Ajith, former director of KTDC, have joined as directors of ICL Fincorp. Megastar Mammootty and Miss Samantha are the brand ambassadors of ICL Fincorp.
