= Matías Verón =

Argentine footballer

Personal information
- Date of birth: 30 November 1993 (age 32)
- Place of birth: San Guillermo, Santa Fe, Argentina
- Height: 1.85 m (6 ft 1 in)
- Position: Attacking midfielder

Team information
- Current team: Matagalpa
- Number: 9

Youth career
- –2015: Atlético de Rafaela

Senior career*
Years	Team	Apps	(Gls)
2015–2016	Tiro Federal		
2016–2017	Libertad		
2017–2020	Juventud Unida RC	8	(1)
2020	Aizawl	8	(1)
2020–2021	Guadix		
2022	Muthoot FA		
2022	George Telegraph		
2022–2023	Aizawl	19	(1)
2023–	Matagalpa	13	(1)
- * Club domestic league appearances and goals as of 19:56, 24 October 2023 (UTC)

Matías Verón (born 30 November 1993) is an Argentine professional footballer who plays as an attacking midfielder for Matagalpa FC in the Liga Primera de Nicaragua.

== Club career ==
Born in Argentina, Matías made his senior debut with Argentine side Tiro Federal de Morteros. Unfortunately, he couldn't make any appearances.

In July 2016, Verón moved to Libertad featuring in the Torneo Argentino A.

In 2017, Verón was transferred to Argentine side Club Juventud Unida Rio Cuarto.

On 21 January 2020, Matías penned a deal with the Indian I-League side Aizawl and secured 8 appearances and scored his maiden goal on 9 February 2020 against East Bengal. He rejoined the club in 2022.
