= Bala Dahir =

Nigerian footballer

Personal information
- Full name: Bala Alhassan Dahir
- Date of birth: 5 March 1988 (age 38)
- Place of birth: Benue State, Nigeria
- Height: 1.75 m (5 ft 9 in)
- Position: Midfielder

Youth career
- Lobi Stars

Senior career*
Years	Team	Apps	(Gls)
- Druk United
2014–2015	Garhwal		
2015–2016	Minerva Punjab		
2017	Kerala	13	(3)
2017	Peerless	5	(0)
2018	Kerala	12	(4)
2018–2019	Minerva Punjab	6	(0)
2020–2021	Luca Soccer Club	5	(1)
- * Club domestic league appearances and goals

Bala Alhassan Dahir (born 5 March 1988) is a Nigerian professional footballer who plays as a midfielder.

== Career statistics ==
As of 7 December 2018.

Club	Season	League			Cup		Continental		Other		Total	
Club	Season	Division	Apps	Goals	Apps	Goals	Apps	Goals	Apps	Goals	Apps	Goals
Kerala	2017–18	I-League 2nd Division	9	4	0	0	–		0	0	9	4
Minerva Punjab	2018–19	I-League	6	0	0	0	–		0	0	6	0
Career total			15	6	0	0	0	0	0	0	15	6
