= Torben Witajewski =

German professional association football coach

Personal information
- Full name: Torben Philip Witajewski
- Date of birth: 9 May 1995 (age 31)
- Place of birth: Hannover, Germany

Team information
- Current team: unemployed

Managerial career
- Years: Team
- 2015–2016: Heeßeler SV (youth coach)
- 2016–2017: TSV Berenbostel (youth coach)
- 2016–2017: BSC Acosta (youth coach)
- 2017–2018: SV Arminia Hannover (youth coach)
- 2019–2020: SF Aligse (assistant)
- 2021–2021: Luca SC
- 2021–2022: FT Braunschweig (youth coach)
- 2023-2023: Pakistan (assistant)

Torben Witajewski (born 9 May 1995) is a German football coach. Having begun his career at the age of 15, he has taken roles coaching numerous youth teams across Europe and Asia. He also served as assistant coach for the Pakistan national football team in July to August 2023.

== Career ==
Witajewski began his coaching career in 2010 at the age of 15 for the reserves of SV 06 Lehrte, a local club in Lehrte, and in 2015 he became the under 17 youth coach for Heeßeler SV in Hannover. In 2016, he was appointed as youth coach for TSV Berenbostel and Braunschweiger SC Acosta; in 2017, he coached the under 19 side of SV Arminia Hannover; and in 2019, he took a role as assistant coach for SF Aligse.

He subsequently moved to India, where he coached Luca SC in Malappuram, Kerala from 2021 to 2022. He also coached the under 17 side of FT Braunschweig. In June 2023, Witajewski joined the Pakistan national football team as an assistant coach under head coach Shahzad Anwar for the 2023 Mauritius Four Nations Cup followed by the 2023 SAFF Championship in India. He also held the position of match analyst for the team.
