= Mar Athanasius College =

Degree-level college in Kerala, India

Coordinates: 10.0705°N 76.6238°E

- Type: Public
- Established: 1955
- Affiliations: Mahatma Gandhi University
- Principal: Dr. Sunil C. Mathew
- Location: Kothamangalam, Kerala, India
- Campus: Urban
- Website: macollege.in

Mar Athanasius College is a general degree-level college located in Kothamangalam, in the Indian state of Kerala. Established in 1955, the college is affiliated with Mahatma Gandhi University and offers undergraduate, postgraduate, and research-level programmes in arts, commerce, and sciences.

The college was ranked 74th among colleges in India by the National Institutional Ranking Framework (NIRF) in 2024.

== History ==
Mar Athanasius College was established in 1955 under the leadership and vision of the late Rev. Fr. Isaac Alappat, who played a pivotal role in its foundation. Initially affiliated with the University of Kerala, it later came under the jurisdiction of Mahatma Gandhi University when the latter was established in 1983.

== Departments and courses ==
The college has multiple departments offering various academic programmes.

=== Postgraduate Departments of Science ===
- Physics
- Chemistry
- Mathematics
- Botany
- Statistics
- Zoology
- Actuarial Science
- Microbiology
- Biotechnology
- Biochemistry
- Data analytics
- Integrated Biology

=== Arts and Commerce ===
- Malayalam
- English
- Hindi
- Sociology
- History
- Political science
- Economics
- Commerce

=== Physical Education ===
The Physical Education department is actively involved in promoting sports activities. Mar Athanasius College's football team became the first college team from Kerala to qualify for the Kerala Premier League.

== Accreditation and recognition ==
Mar Athanasius College is recognised by the University Grants Commission (UGC). It has undergone accreditation by the National Assessment and Accreditation Council (NAAC).

== Notable alumni ==
- Eldhose Paul – Athlete specialising in triple jump, Gold Medalist at the 2022 Commonwealth Games.
