= Sports Academy Tirur =

Indian professional association football club based in Tirur

SAT
- Full name: Sports Academy Tirur Football Club
- Nickname: The Fires
- Short name: SAT
- Founded: 2011; 15 years ago
- Ground: Rajiv Gandhi Municipal Stadium Tirur; Payyanad Stadium
- Capacity: 5,000; 30,000
- President: Latheef VP
Home colours	Away colours	Third colours

Sports Academy Tirur, commonly known as SAT or SAT FC Kerala, is an Indian professional football club based in Tirur, Kerala. They last played in the Kerala Premier League, the top division of football in Kerala, and the I-League 3, the third level of the Indian football league system.

== History ==
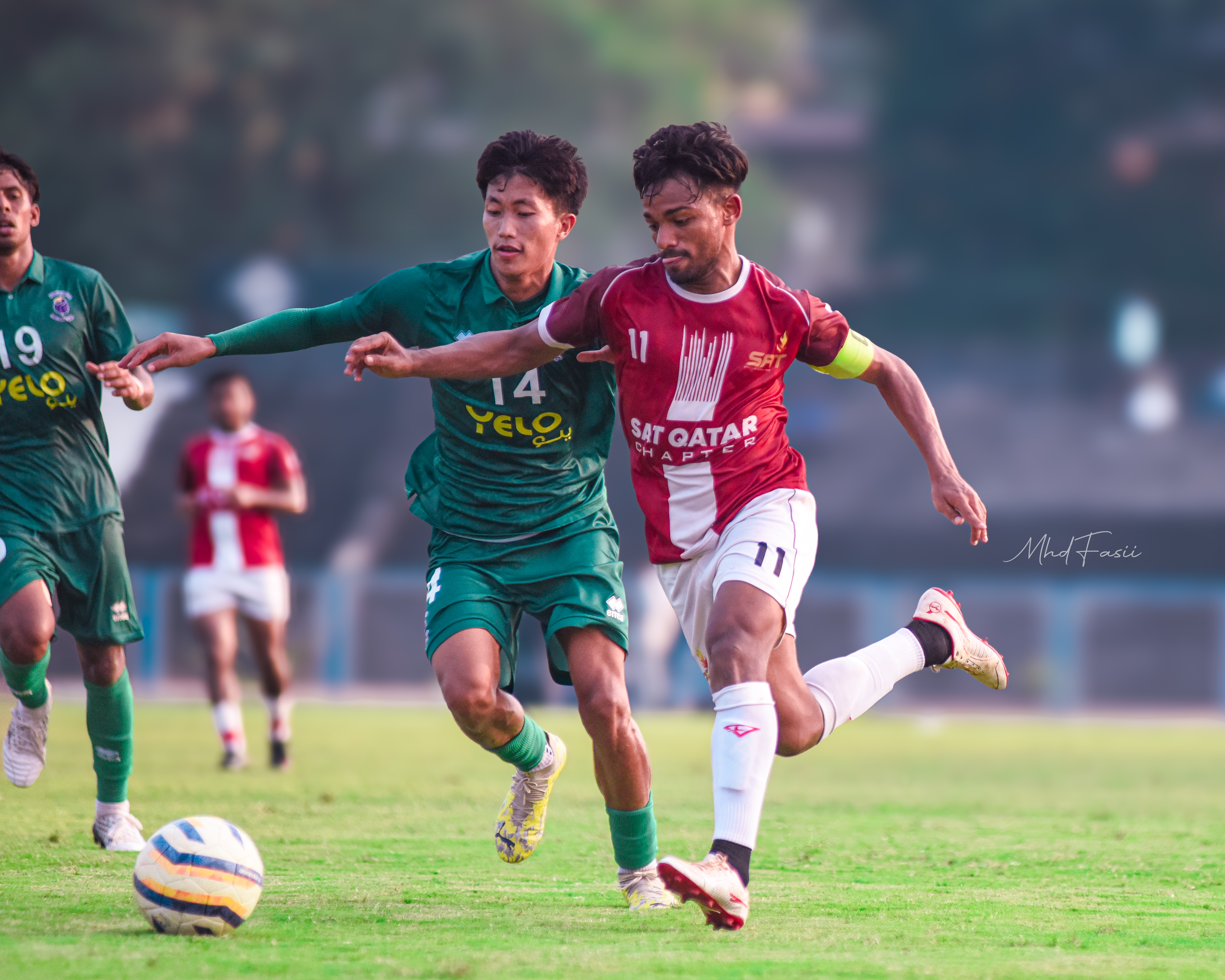
Sports Academy Tirur vs Kerala United

SAT was founded in 2011 and began playing in the Kerala Premier League for the 2016–17 season. In July 2024, it was announced that SAT would participate in the 2024–25 I-League 3. The club was placed in group A, alongside Diamond Harbour, Sports Odisha, Lakecity and Ghaziabad City. Their first match was on September 3 against Sports Odisha at the Naihati Stadium. Goals from Rifhath Ramzan and Hasanul Hadi gave SAT a 2–0 victory. Win against Ghaziabad City and draw against Lakecity earned them a spot in the playoffs. In the play offs they secured their spot in the 2024–25 I-League 2.

== Stadium ==
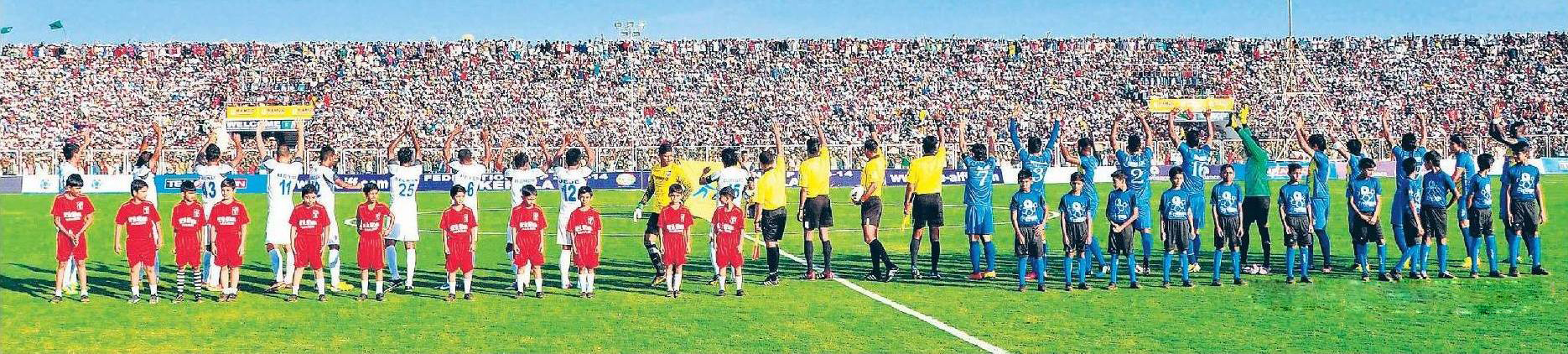

Sports Academy Tirur plays its home matches at the Rajiv Gandhi Municipal Stadium located in Tirur. They also use the Payyanad Stadium for selected matches.

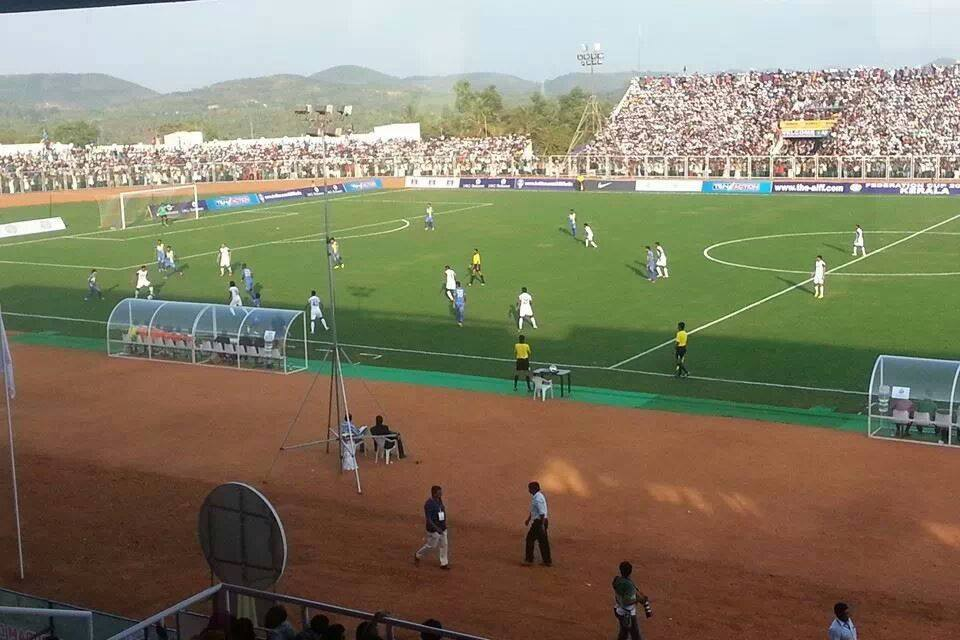

== Kit manufacturers and shirt sponsors ==
Period	Kit manufacturer	Shirt sponsor
2020—2023		AB Bismi
2023—2024		SAT Qatar
2024—2025	Fly High	E-Logic Global
2025—	Fly High	Fossil Petroleum

== Players ==
=== First-team squad ===
As of January 2025

Note: Flags indicate national team as defined under FIFA eligibility rules; some limited exceptions apply. Players may hold more than one non-FIFA nationality.

No.	Pos.	Nation	Player
1	GK	IND	Mohanraj K
3	DF	IND	Muhammed Thasleem
5	DF	IND	Tony A
6	DF	IND	Saivin Ericson
7	FW	IND	Hasanul Hadi
8	MF	IND	Unise K (captain)
11	MF	IND	Muhammed Basheer
12	FW	IND	Senthamil S
13	DF	IND	Muhammed Nihal
15	MF	IND	Shafeeq Thekkumpat
16	MF	IND	Anittan A
17	FW	IND	Aswin P

No.	Pos.	Nation	Player
18	FW	IND	Niketh N
20	DF	IND	Lijo K
22	MF	IND	Abdul Hannan
23	MF	IND	Arshad
24	MF	IND	Shanu
25	MF	IND	Kalid Roshan
26	DF	IND	Sabarin Bush
29	MF	IND	Muhammed Habeel
34	MF	IND	Najeeb
36	DF	IND	Aquib Nawab
38	DF	IND	Muhammed Musharaf
41	GK	IND	Muhammed Fayiz

== Statistics and records ==
As of 25 March 2025

Season	League								Finals	Cup	AFC	Top Scorer	
Season	Division	P	W	D	L	GF	GA	Position	Finals	Cup	AFC	Player	Goals
2016–17	KPL	11	6	3	2	15	8	Semi-final	—	—	—	(India) Shaheed	6
2017–18	KPL	9	5	1	3	16	12	Semi-final	—	—	—	(India) Thabseer/Faslurahman/Shaheed	3
2018–19	KPL	6	2	0	4	6	8	Group stage	—	—	—	(India) Mohamed Nisham	3
2019–20	KPL	7	4	2	1	12	3	Semi-final	—	—	—	(Senegal) E. Kamara	8
2020–21	KPL	5	1	3	1	7	5	Group stage	—	—	—	(India) Nasar	3
2021–22	KPL	11	7	2	2	21	5	Semi-final	—	—	—	(India) Arshad	4
2022–23	KPL	7	4	3	0	11	5	Group stage	—	—	—	—	
2023–24	KPL	16	10	2	4	37	23	Runners-up	—	—	—	(India) Rahul KP	7
2024–25	I-League 3	8	4	2	2	15	12	3rd	—	—	—	(India) Adheeb Basheer	3
2024–25	I-League 2	11	4	3	4	13	15	5th	—	—	—	(India) Senthamil S	5

== Honours ==
=== League ===
- I-League 3
  - Third place (1): 2024–25
- Kerala Premier League
  - Runners-up (1): 2023–24
