= Muthoot Football Academy =

Indian professional association football club based in Kochi

Muthoot FA
- Full name: Muthoot Football Academy
- Short name: MFA
- Founded: 2021; 5 years ago
- Ground: Various
- Owner: Muthoot Pappachan Group
- Head coach: Othallo Tabia
- League: Kerala Premier League
- Website: https://www.muthootfootball.com/
Home colours	Away colours

Muthoot Football Academy, commonly known as MFA or Muthoot FA, is an Indian professional football club based in Kochi, Kerala. The club last competed in the Kerala Premier League, the top division of football in Kerala.

== Kit manufacturers and shirt sponsors ==
Period	Kit manufacturer	Shirt sponsor
2021—2025		Muthoot Pappachan Group

== Statistics and records ==
As of 25 March 2025

Season	League								Finals	Cup	AFC	Top dcorer	
Season	Division	P	W	D	L	GF	GA	Position	Finals	Cup	AFC	Player	Goals
2021–22	KPL	10	7	0	3	23	11	Group stage	—	—	—	(Argentina) Matías Verón	9
2022–23	KPL	6	2	2	2	9	9	Group stage	—	—	—	—	
2023–24	KPL	15	8	2	5	29	11	Semi final	—	—	—	(India) Salahudheen Adnan	11
2024–25	KPL	14	10	3	1	34	9	Champions	—	—	—	(India) Devdath S	8

== Honours ==
=== League ===
- Kerala Premier League
  - Champions (1): 2024–25

== See also ==
- List of football clubs in Kerala
- Football in Kerala
