= Koppam =

Koppam Koppam
- Town
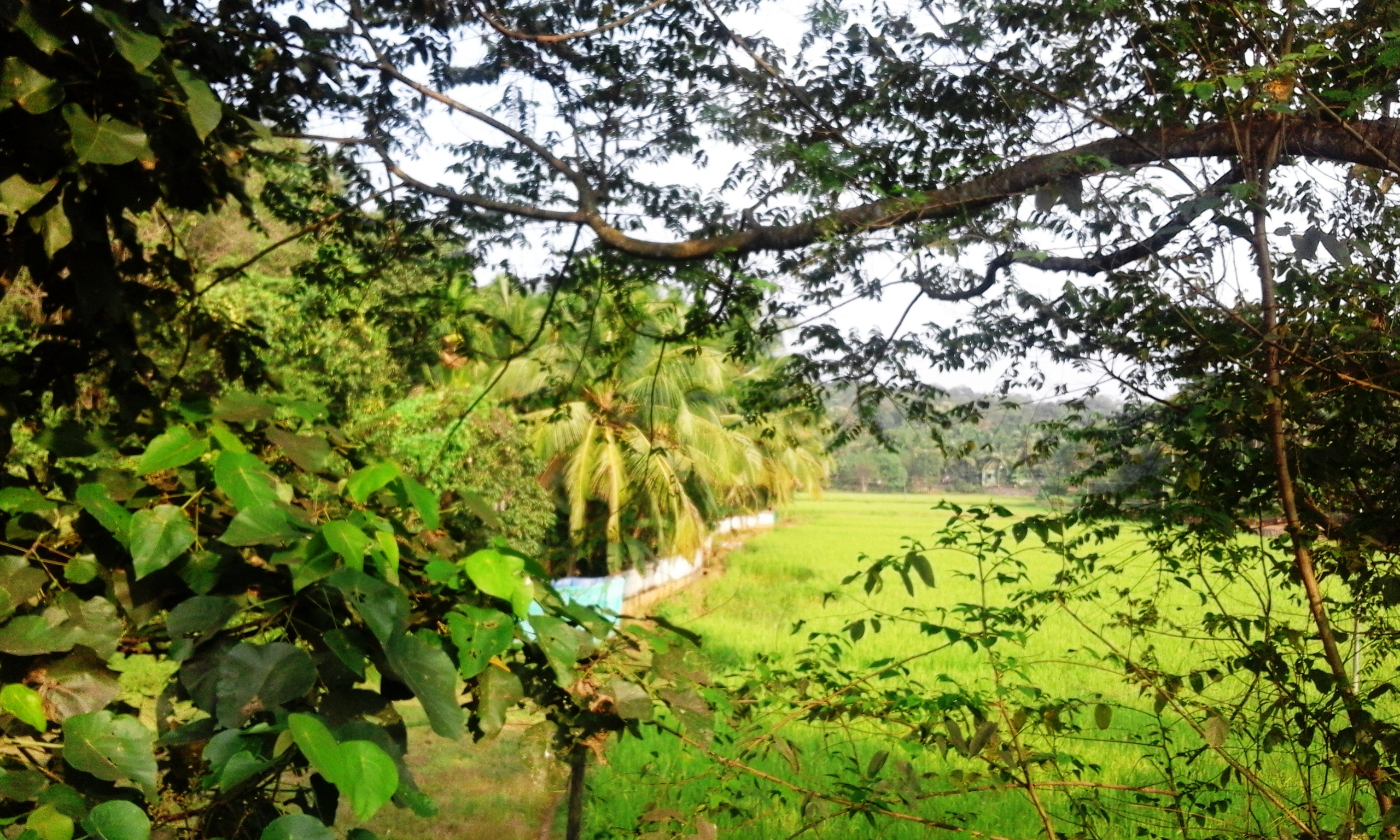
- Kulukalloor, Koppam

- Location in Kerala, India Koppam (India)
- Coordinates: 10°53′0″N 76°11′0″E
- Country: India
- State: Kerala
- District: Palakkad

Area
  - Total: 25.85 km^{2} (9.98 sq mi)

Population (2011)
  - Total: 30,169
  - Density: 1,167/km^{2} (3,023/sq mi)

Languages
  - Official: Malayalam, English
- Time zone: UTC+5:30 (IST)
- PIN: 679307
- Vehicle registration: KL-52

Koppam is a growing town and gram panchayat in Pattambi taluk, Palakkad district, in the state of Kerala, India.

The wider region is associated with Kerala's traditional Ashtavaidya Ayurvedic heritage, including the Pulamanthole Mooss lineage.

== Demographics ==
As of 2011 Census, Koppam had a population of 30,169 with 14,498 males and 15,671 females. Koppam village has an area of 25.85 km^{2} (9.98 sq mi) with 6,103 families residing in it. 12.7% of the population was under 6 years of age. Koppam village had an average literacy of 92.95% higher than the national average of 74.04% and lower than state average of 94.00%.
