= Kerala Police FC =

Indian association football club

- Full name: Kerala Police Football Club
- Short name: KPFC; KP
- Founded: 1984; 42 years ago
- Ground: Chandrasekharan Nair Stadium
- Capacity: 25,000
- Owner: Kerala Police
- Head coach: Siddik Vayakkarerakath
- League: Kerala Premier League
Home colours	Away colours	Third colours

Kerala Police Football Club is an Indian institutional football club based in Thiruvananthapuram, Kerala, that competes in the Kerala Premier League, the fifth tier of the Indian football league system. It is the first club from Kerala to win the Federation Cup.

== History ==
In 1984, the then Kerala Director General of Police (DGP) thought it would be a good idea to form a football team for the police department. He not only realized the potential of the talent pool available in the state, but also wanted to bring in a positive image of the people when thinking of the department.

Kerala Police Football Team is governed by the Kerala Police and has won the Federation Cup twice. In 1996-97 they participated in the inaugural edition of National Football League. In 1998 they took part in the first edition of NFL 2nd Division. Over the years they played several times in the Federation Cup and Durand Cup. In 2014-15 they reached the final of Kerala Premier League, but were defeated by SBT. In 2019-20 they reached the league semifinal.

== Honours ==
- Federation Cup
  - Winners (2): 1990, 1991
- Kerala State Club Football Championship
  - Winners (6): 1985, 1987,1995, 1998, 2014, 2016
  - Runners-up (5): 1990, 1993, 1994, 1996, 2013
- Mohan Kumar Mangalam Football Tournament
  - Winners (1): 2017
- DCM Trophy
  - Runners-up (1): 1954
- Scissors Cup
  - Runners-up (1): 1993

== Statistics and records ==
Season	KPL
2013–14	Group stage
2014–15	Final
2015–16	Group stage
2016–17	Group stage
2017–18	Group stage
2018–19	Pulled out
2019–20	Semifinal
2020–21	Group stage
2021–22	Group stage
2022–23	Group stage
2023–24	Semi Finals

Key

- Pos. = Position in league
- Attendance/G = Average league attendance

== See also ==
- Football in Kerala
- List of football clubs in India
