= Golden Threads FC =

Indian semi-professional association football club based in Kochi

Golden Threads
- Full name: Golden Threads Football Club
- Founded: 2010; 16 years ago
- Owner: Golden Threads
- Head coach: Shiju Rajan
- League: Kerala Premier League
Home colours	Away colours	Third colours

Golden Threads Football Club is an Indian professional football club based in Kochi, Kerala, that plays in the Kerala Premier League, the top league of football in Kerala. They have also played in the I-League Second Division.

== History ==
Golden Threads Football Club were formed on 10 April 2010, in Ernakulam, to compete in the Kerala Premier League. After achieving success in the regional league, they got the chance to play in the national level competition, ONGC I-League Division 2.

They have won the Cochin Premier League multiple times. They won the 2021–22 Kerala Premier League after defeating KSEB in the final, and again qualified for the I-League 2nd Division.

== Statistics and records ==
Season	KPL	I-League 2
2010	-	Group stage
2011	-	Group stage
2012	-	Group stage
2013–14	Group Stage	DNQ
2018–19	Group stage	DNQ
2019–20	DNP	DNP
2020–21	Group stage	
2021–22	Champions	
2022–23	Group stage	

== Honours ==
=== League ===
- Kerala Premier League
  - Champions (1): 2021–22
