= Thrissur Municipal Corporation Stadium =

Stadium in India

Thrissur Corporation Stadium
- Palace Stadium; TMC Stadium
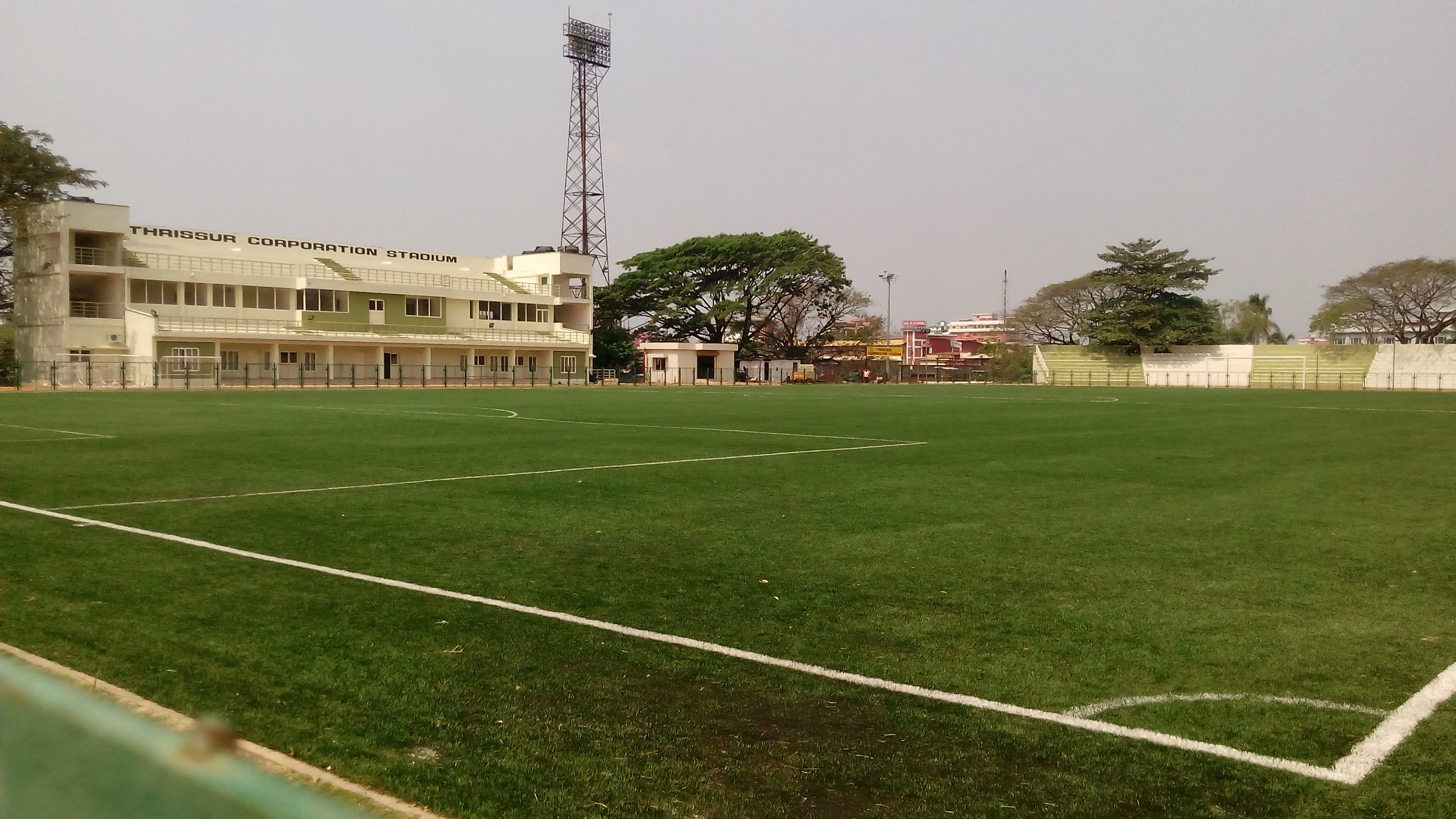
- Location: Thrissur, Kerala, India
- Owner: Thrissur Municipal Corporation
- Capacity: 15,000
- Surface: Grass

Construction
- Opened: 1978
- Architect: T. J. Antony

Tenants
- FC Kerala (2014–present); Thrissur Magic FC (2024–present)

Thrissur Corporation Stadium is a football stadium owned by Thrissur Municipal Corporation. Situated in Thrissur city, it is also known as Palace Stadium. It is one of the oldest stadiums in Kerala, India and has capacity to hold 15,000 people. After renovation, and it has been lifted to international standards.

== History ==
Municipal Corporation Stadium was the venue for the largest and highest temporary stadium in the world according to Guinness World Records, which can hold 35,000 spectators at a height of 70 feet. The stadium was constructed for the Federation Cup. It was also the venue for Federation Cup in April 1990.

== I-League 2nd Division ==
FC Kerala used it to play their home matches for 2017–18 I-League 2nd Division.

== Synthetic turf ==
The stadium has first synthetic football turf in Kerala state, and FIFA 2 star certification. The turf was imported from FieldTurf, United States, and installed by Great Sports Infra Pvt Ltd. The 2 star certification was issued after a series of tests conducted by FIFA approved laboratory. The stadium was renovated by Government of Kerala for National Games of India in 2015. Football turf has an approximate area of 7,150 square metres. Renovated stadium has eight-lane synthetic tracks surrounding the football ground. Synthetic track and football ground.

== Kerala Premier League ==
Kerala Premier League teams FC Kerala and FC Thrissur plays their home matches on the stadium.

== Events held ==
- Santosh Trophy in 1981–82, 1999–2000
- Federation Cup in 1990
- N.I. David Memorial Trophy
