= Kerala Premier League =

- Organising body: Kerala Football Association
- Founded: 1998; 28 years ago (as Kerala Football League)
- Country: India
- Number of clubs: 14
- Level on pyramid: 5
- Promotion to: I-League 3
- Relegation to: Kerala Premier League Second Division
- Current champions: Gokulam Kerala B (3rd title)
- Most championships: SBT Thiruvananthapuram (6 titles)
- Broadcaster: Sports Reporter(YouTube)
- Current: 2025–26

The Kerala Premier League is the highest state-level football league organized by the Kerala Football Association and played in the state of Kerala, India. It is the overall fifth tier of the Indian football league system. For sponsorship reasons it is officially known as the Elite Kerala Premier League. Founded in 1998, the Kerala Football League was the first football league in Kerala, and got rebranded in 2013 as the KPL. Gokulam Kerala FC Reserves is the current champion.

== History ==
=== Kerala Football League ===
After the introduction of the National Football League by the All India Football Federation, the Kerala Football Association started its Kerala Football League (KFL) in 1998. The team finishing top was nominated to 2nd division of the National Football League.

=== 1998 season ===
FC Kochin was crowned the inaugural champion. SBT finished in second place.

=== 1999 season ===
The second edition of Kerala Football League was held in Kochi and Kollam in December 1999. FC Kochin retained the tille, and SBT FC become the runners up.

=== 2007 season ===
SBT FC won the title, and Central Excise Kochi become the runners up.

== Format ==
The league features teams from the state of Kerala affiliated with the KFA. The top four teams from each group qualify for the final round. A women's league started in the 2014–15 season with 8 teams.

== Teams (2026) ==
=== Teams and locations ===
KFA

	Team	City
1	Calicut	Kozhikode
2	EMEA College	Kondotty
3	Golden Threads	Kochi
4	Gokulam Kerala B	Kozhikode
5	Inter Kerala	Kothamangalam
6	Kerala Blasters B	Kochi
7	Kerala Police	Trivandrum
8	Kerala United	Thrissur
9	KSEB	Trivandrum
10	Kovalam	Kovalam
11	PFC Kerala	Parappur
12	Real Malabar	Kondotty
13	SAI Centre	Kollam
14	Wayanad United	Kalpetta

== Number of teams by region ==
No. of teams	Districts	Team(s)
3	Ernakulam	Golden Threads FC, Inter Kerala FC, Kerala Blasters B
3	Trivandrum	Kerala Police, Kovalam FC, KSEB
2	Malappuram	EMEA College, Real Malabar FC
2	Kozhikode	Calicut, Gokulam Kerala B
2	Thrissur	Kerala United FC, PFC Kerala
1	Wayanad	Wayanad United FC
1	Kollam	SAI Centre

== Sponsorship ==
- 2013–15, 2018–21: Ramco
- 2015–16: Dentcare Dental Lab
- 2016–17: Cochin Shipyard
- 2017–18: ICL Fincorp
- 2022–24: Scoreline, Elite

== Team statistics ==
Team	Winners	Runners-up
SBI Kerala	6	5
Gokulam Kerala B	3	3
KSEB	2	2
FC Kochin	2	1
Kerala United FC/Quartz FC	2	1
Viva Kerala FC	1	0
Eagles	1	0
Indian Navy FC	1	0
Kerala Blasters B	1	0
Golden Threads FC	1	0
Muthoot FA	1	0
Trivandrum Titanium FC	0	2
Central Excise Club	0	2
Kerala Police	0	2
FC Thrissur	0	1
SAT	0	1
Calicut	0	1

== Championship summary ==
Season	Champions	Runners-up	Ref
1998–99	FC Kochin	SBT	
1999–2000	FC Kochin	SBT	
2000–01	SBT	Trivandrum Titanium FC	
2001–02	League cancelled		
2002–03	League cancelled		
2003–04	SBT	FC Kochin	
2004–05	KSEB	SBT	
2005–06	Viva Kerala FC	SBT	
2006–07	SBT	Central Excise Club	
2007–08	SBT	Trivandrum Titanium FC	
2009–2013	League not held		
2013–14	Eagles F.C.	SBT	
2014–15	SBT	Kerala Police	
2015–16	SBT	Central Excise Club	
2016–17	KSEB	FC Thrissur	
2017–18	Gokulam Kerala B	Quartz FC	
2018–19	Indian Navy FC	Gokulam Kerala B	
2019–20	Kerala Blasters B	Gokulam Kerala B	
2020–21	Gokulam Kerala B	KSEB	
2021–22	Golden Threads FC	KSEB	
2022–23	Kerala United FC	Gokulam Kerala B	
2023–24	Kerala United FC	SAT	
2024–25	Muthoot FA	Kerala Police	
2025–26	Gokulam Kerala B (3)	Calicut	

== Top scorers ==
Season	Top scorer	Team	Goals
2015–16	(India) Askar	Central Excise Cochin	6
2016–17	(India) Firos Kalathingal	Kerala Police	7
2017–18	(Ghana) Emmanuel Aidoo	Quartz FC	12
2018–19	(India) Vishnu (Liberia) Harry Moris (India) Bipaka Thapa (Ghana) Christian Sabah	Shooters United Padne; FC Kerala; Indian Navy; Gokulam Kerala B	6
2019–20	(Ghana) Isahak Nuhu Seidu (Senegal) E. Kamara	Golden Threads FC; SAT	8
2020–21	(Mali) Saliou Guindo	Gokulam Kerala B	8
2021–22	(Ghana) Isahak Nuhu Seidu	Golden Threads FC	12
2022–23	(Ghana) Samuel Mensa Konney	Gokulam Kerala B	10
2023–24	(India) Salahudheen Adnan	Muthoot FA	11
2024–25	(India) Muhammad Ajsal (India) Arjun V (India) Sajeesh E	Kerala Blasters B KSEB; Kerala Police	6
2025–26	(India) Sajeesh E	Kerala Police	8

== See also ==
- Football in Kerala
- Kerala State Club Football Championship
- Malabar Premier League
- History of Indian football
