= List of Gokulam Kerala F.C. players =

Gokulam Kerala is an Indian professional football club based in Kozhikode, Kerala. The club began competing in the I-League, the first division of Indian football, in the 2017–18 I-League season.

As of November 30, 2018, a total of 63 players have been registered on the squad with the Gokulam Kerala. This consists of 56 outfield players, and 7 goalkeepers. Henry Kisekka is the team's all-time top scorers with 7 goals in all competition.

== Players ==
=== Foreign players ===
Name	Pos.	Nation	Season
Zohib Islam Amiri	MF	(Afghanistan)	2019-2020
Nathaniel García	MF	(Trinidad and Tobago)	2019-2020
Bruno Pelissari	MF	(Brazil)	2019-2020
Marcus Joseph	FW	(Trinidad and Tobago)	2018-2020
Andre Ettienne	DF	(Trinidad and Tobago)	2018-2020
Henry Kisekka	FW	(Uganda)	2018, 2019-2020
Fabien Vorbe	MF	(Haiti)	2018-2019
Russell Alfred	FW	(Trinidad and Tobago)	2018-2019
Ejjiogu Emmanual	FW	(Nigeria)	2018-2019
Christian Sabah	FW	(Ghana)	2018-19
Charles Teiko Folley	FW	(Ghana)	2019
Daniel Addo	DF	(Ghana)	2017-19
Musa Mudde	MF	(Uganda)	2017-19
Joel Sunday	FW	(Nigeria)	2018-19
Arthur Kouassi	FW	(Ivory Coast)	2018-19
Guilherme Batata	MF	(Brazil)	2018-19
Antonio German	FW	(Grenada)	2018-19
Fabricio Ortiz	DF	(Argentina)	2018-19
Emmanuel Chigozie	DF	(Nigeria)	2017-18
Mahmood Al-Ajmi	MF	(Bahrain)	2017-18
Odafa Onyeka Okolie	FW	(Nigeria)	2017-18
Khaled Al Saleh	MF	(Syria)	2017-18
Francis Ambané	MF	(Cameroon)	2017-18
Lelo Mbele	FW	(Democratic Republic of the Congo)	2017-18
Kamo Stephane Bayi	FW	(Ivory Coast)	2017-18
Hristijan Denkovski	FW	(North Macedonia)	2017-18
Gulom Urunov	MF	(Uzbekistan)	2017-18

=== Indian Players ===
As of 15 December 2018

Name	Pos.	Nation	season
Ashok Singh	DF	(India)	2019-
Naocha singh	DF	(India)	2019-
Ubaid CK	GK	(India)	2019-
Nikhil C Barnard	GK	(India)	2017-18
Bilal Khan	GK	(India)	2017-18
Priyant Singh	GK	(India)	2017-18
Ajmal P A	GK	(India)	2017-
Mohamed Salah	DF	(India)	2017-2018, 2019-
Provat Lakra	DF	(India)	2017-18
Mohamed Irshad	DF	(India)	2017-18
Sushanth Mathew	DF	(India)	2017-18
Shinu	DF	(India)	2017-
Santu Singh	DF	(India)	2017-
Dibin M D	DF	(India)	2017-
Sanju G	DF	(India)	2017-
Balwinder Singh	DF	(India)	2017-2018
Muhammed Rashid	MF	(India)	2017-
Arjun Jayaraj	MF	(India)	2017-2019
Francis Xavier	MF	(India)	2017-18
Vicky Meitei	MF	(India)	2017-18
Mohammad Saukat	MF	(India)	2017-18
Suhair V P	FW	(India)	2018-2019
Jimshad U	FW	(India)	2017-18
Salman K	FW	(India)	2017-
Arif Shaikh	FW	(India)	2017-18
Usman Ashik	FW	(India)	2017-
Lalramengmawia	FW	(India)	2017-
Rohit Mirza	FW	(India)	2017-
Syed Shoaib Ahmed	FW	(India)	2017-18
Laldampuia	FW	(India)	2017-
Kivi Zhimomi	FW	(India)	2017-18
Arnab Das Sharma	GK	(India)	2018-
Shibinraj Kunniyil	GK	(India)	2018-
Deepak kumar	DF	(India)	2018-
Abhishek Das	DF	(India)	2018-
Wungyanyg Muirang	DF	(India)	2018-
Jishnu Balakrishnan	DF	(India)	2018-
Mayakkannan	DF	(India)	2018-
Monotosh Chakladar	DF	(India)	2018-
Baoringdao Bodo	MF	(India)	2018-
Pritam Singh	MF	(India)	2018-
Gani Nigam	FW	(India)	2018-
Bijesh T B	FW	(India)	2018-
Rajesh S	FW	(India)	2018-
Nasar PA	FW	(India)	2018-
Jestin George	DF	(India)	2018-
Satyajit Bordoloi	GK	(India)	2018
Dimple Bhagat	DF	(India)	2019-

== By nationality ==
Country	Number of players
India	45
Trinidad	4
Nigeria	4
Ghana	3
Uganda	2
Ivory Coast	2
Brazil	2
Bahrain	1
Uzbekistan	1
Macedonia	1
Democratic Republic of the Congo	1
Cameroon	1
Syria	1
Argentina	1
Grenada	1
Haiti	1
Afghanistan	1
