= 2018–19 Gokulam Kerala FC season =

Indian football club season

Gokulam Kerala
2018–19 season
- Head Coach: Gift Raikhan
- Stadium: EMS Corporation Stadium, Calicut, Kerala
- I-League: 10th
- Top goalscorer: League: Marcus Joseph (7); All: Marcus Joseph (7)
Home colours	Away colours

The 2018–19 season was Gokulam Kerala's second season since its establishment in 2017 and their second season in the I-League. Gokulam Kerala was also involved in the Super Cup.

== Review and events ==
=== I-League ===
Gokulam Kerala started their 2018-19 Hero I-League campaign against Mohun Bagan on 27 October 2018. The match resulted in a draw. Their first win was in their 4th match against Shillong Lajong on 11 November 2018.

== Squad information ==
=== First-team squad ===
As of 15 December 2018

Note: Flags indicate national team as defined under FIFA eligibility rules; some limited exceptions apply. Players may hold more than one non-FIFA nationality.

No.	Pos.	Nation	Player
1	GK	IND	Ajmal PA
3	DF	IND	Deepak Kumar (on loan from (India) East Bengal)
4	DF	TRI	Andre Ettienne
5	DF	GHA	Daniel Addo
6	DF	IND	Mohammed Irshad
7	FW	TRI	Marcus Joseph
9	FW	IND	Suhair V P
11	MF	HAI	Fabien Vorbe
12	MF	IND	Muhammed Rashid
14	DF	IND	Abhishek Das
15	MF	IND	Arjun Jayaraj
16	FW	IND	Salman K
17	FW	IND	Ghani Ahmmed Nigam

No.	Pos.	Nation	Player
18	DF	IND	Wungyanyg Muirang
19	DF	IND	Jishnu Balakrishnan
20	FW	IND	Bijesh T B
22	MF	IND	Pritam Singh
23	MF	IND	Imran Khan (on loan from (India) FC Goa)
24	MF	IND	Jestin George
25	DF	IND	Mayakkannan
27	FW	NGA	Ejiogu Emmanual
28	DF	IND	Monotosh Chakladar
29	GK	IND	Arnab Das Sharma
30	FW	IND	Rajesh S
42	GK	IND	Shibinraj Kunniyil
44	DF	IND	Mehtab Singh
46	FW	IND	Rohit Mirza
-	FW	IND	Usman Ashik

== Transfers and loans ==
=== Transfers in ===
No.	Pos.	Nation	Name	Age	Moving From	Window	Notes
3	DF	(India)	Deepak kumar	28	(India) East Bengal	Summer	Loan
4	DF	(Argentina)	Fabricio Ortiz	28	(Jordan) Shabab Al-Aqaba	Summer	
7	MF	(Grenada)	Antonio German	26	(England) St Albans City	Summer	
8	MF	(Brazil)	Guilherme Batata	26	(Malta) Hamrun Spartans	Summer	
11	MF	(Ivory Coast)	Arthur Kouassi	28	(Mongolia) Ulaanbaatar City	Summer	
14	DF	(India)	Abhishek Das	24	(India) Mohun Bagan	Summer	
17	MF	(India)	Ghani Ahmmed Nigam	20	(India) Pune City	Summer	
18	DF	(India)	Wungyanyg Muirang	19		Summer	
19	DF	(India)	Jishnu Balakrishnan	19	(India) Kerala Blasters	Summer	
20	FW	(India)	Bijesh T B	22		Summer	
21	MF	(India)	Baoringdao Bodo	18	(India) Chennaiyin FC	Summer	Loan
22	MF	(India)	Pritam Singh	25	(India) NEROCA	Summer	
25	DF	(India)	Mayakkannan	21		Summer	
27	FW	(Ghana)	Christian Sabah	20		Summer	
28	DF	(India)	Monotosh Chakladar	20	(India) Mohammedan S.C.	Summer	
29	GK	(India)	Arnab Das Sharma	30	(India) Delhi Dynamos	Summer	
30	FW	(India)	Rajesh S	26		Summer	
31	GK	(India)	Satyajit Bordoloi			Summer	
33	FW	(India)	Nasar PA			Summer	
42	GK	(India)	Shibinraj Kunniyil	25	(India) Mohun Bagan	Summer	
13	FW	(Nigeria)	Joel Sunday	29	(India) Rainbow A.C.	Winter	
32	DF	(India)	Dimple Bhagat			Winter	
NA	MF	(Haiti)	Fabien Vorbe	28	(India) NEROCA	Winter	

=== Transfers out ===
No.	Pos.	Nation	Name	Age	Moving To	Window	Notes
1	GK	(India)	Nikhil C Barnard	28	(India) Chennaiyin	Summer	
2	DF	(India)	Mohamed Salah	23	(India) Sports Academy Tirur	Summer	
3	DF	(Nigeria)	Emmanuel Chigozie	26	(India) Aryan	Summer	
4	DF	(India)	Provat Lakra	20	(India) NorthEast United	Summer	
6	DF	(India)	Mohamed Irshad	23	(India) Minerva Punjab	Summer	
7	DF	(India)	Sushanth Mathew	36		Summer	
9	FW	(North Macedonia)	Hristijan Denkovski	24	(North Macedonia) Belasica	Summer	
11	MF	(Bahrain)	Mahmood Al-Ajmi	31		Summer	
13	FW	(India)	Jimshad U	31		Summer	
17	FW	(India)	Arif Shaikh	24		Summer	
19	MF	(India)	Francis Xavier	25		Summer	
20	MF	(Uzbekistan)	Gulom Urunov	29		Summer	
21	MF	(India)	Vicky Meitei	21	(India) Real Kashmir	Summer	
26	MF	(India)	Mohammad Saukat	20	(India) Tollygunge Agragami	Summer	
27	GK	(India)	Bilal Khan	23	(India) Pune City	Summer	Loan Return
29	FW	(India)	Syed Shoaib Ahmed	22	(India) ARA	Summer	
30	FW	(Uganda)	Henry Kisekka	28	(India) Mohun Bagan	Summer	
31	GK	(India)	Priyant Singh	26	(India) Mohammedan S.C.	Summer	
36	FW	(India)	Kivi Zhimomi	22	(India) NorthEast United	Summer	
7	FW	(Grenada)	Antonio German	26	(Malaysia) Selangor	Winter	
11	MF	(Ivory Coast)	Arthur Kouassi	29	(India) Mohammedan S.C. (Kolkata)	Winter	
21	MF	(India)	Baoringdao Bodo	18	(India) Chennaiyin	Winter	Loan Return
13	FW	(Nigeria)	Joel Sunday	29	(India) Rainbow A.C.	Winter	Loan Return
4	DF	(Argentina)	Fabricio Ortiz	28	(Canada)	Winter	
10	MF	(Uganda)	Musa Mudde	28	(India) SAT	Winter	

== Pre-season and friendlies ==
Win Draw Loss

Gokulam Kerala Played a friendly against Bengaluru FC at Sree Kanteerava Stadium in Bengaluru.

23 September 2018 Friendly	Bengaluru FC	4–1	Gokulam Kerala	Bengaluru
11:00 UTC+5:30	Miku; Chhetri		Goal	Stadium: Sree Kanteerava Stadium

== Technical staff ==
As of 15 April 2018.

Position	Name
Head Coach	(India) Gift Raikhan
Assistant Coach	(Argentina) Emiliano bustos
Assistant Coach India	(India) Sapam Premkanta Singh
Technical Director	(India) Bino George
Technical Consultant	(Brazil) Luiz Greco
Goalkeeping Coach	(India) Fysal K Bappu
Team Manager	(India) Rajah Rizwan
Head of Academy and Grassroots	(India) Mizpha Richards
Academy Manager	(Gibraltar) Joel Richard Williams
Physiotherapist	(India) Adhith K J
Performance Analyst	(India) Muhammed Jaseel
Kit & Equipment Manager	(India) Shamnad M
Massuer	(India) Rashid M
Media manager	(India) Kevin

== Statistics ==
As of 15 December 2018.

=== Squad appearances and goals ===
No.	Pos	Nat	Player	Total		I-League		Super Cup	
No.	Pos	Nat	Player	Apps	Goals	Apps	Goals	Apps	Goals
Goalkeepers
1	GK	(India) IND	Ajmal PA	0	0	0	0	0	0
29	GK	(India) IND	Arnab Das Sharma	10	0	10	0	0	0
42	GK	(India) IND	Shibinraj Kunniyil	10	0	10	0	0	0
-	GK	(India) IND	Satyajit Bordoloi	0	0	0	0	0	0
Defenders
3	DF	(India) IND	Deepak kumar	10	0	9+1	0	0	0
4	DF	(Trinidad and Tobago) TRI	Andre Ettienne	3	0	3	0	0	0
5	DF	(Ghana) GHA	Daniel Addo	19	0	19	0	0	0
6	DF	(India) IND	Mohammed Irshad	8	0	8	0	0	0
14	DF	(India) IND	Abhishek Das	14	0	13+1	0	0	0
18	DF	(India) IND	Wungyanyg Muirang	5	0	3+2	0	0	0
19	DF	(India) IND	Jishnu Balakrishnan	1	0	1	0	0	0
24	DF	(India) IND	Jestin George	1	0	1	0	0	0
25	DF	(India) IND	Mayakkannan	0	0	0	0	0	0
28	DF	(India) IND	Monotosh Chakladar	4	0	3+1	0	0	0
32	DF	(India) IND	Dimple Bhagat	4	0	4	0	0	0
44	DF	(India) IND	Mehtab Singh	5	0	5	0	0	0
Midfielders
8	MF	(Brazil) BRA	Guilherme Batata	16	0	16	0	0	0
11	MF	(Haiti) HAI	Fabien Vorbe	7	0	7	0	0	0
12	MF	(India) IND	Muhammed Rashid	10	0	8+2	0	0	0
15	MF	(India) IND	Arjun Jayaraj	15	1	11+4	1	0	0
22	MF	(India) IND	Pritam Singh	15	1	8+7	1	0	0
23	MF	(India) IND	Imran Khan	9	0	8+1	0	0	0
Forwards
9	FW	(India) IND	Suhair V P	18	1	7+11	1	0	0
7	FW	(Trinidad and Tobago) TRI	Marcus Joseph	9	7	9	7	0	0
16	FW	(India) IND	Salman K	4	0	2+2	0	0	0
17	FW	(India) IND	Ghani Ahmmed Nigam	5	1	3+2	1	0	0
20	FW	(India) IND	Bijesh T B	5	0	0+5	0	0	0
27	FW	(Nigeria) NGA	Ejiogu Emmanual	2	0	2	0	0	0
30	FW	(India) IND	Rajesh S	12	2	7+5	2	0	0
33	FW	(India) IND	Nasar PA	2	0	1+1	0	0	0
40	FW	(India) IND	Lalmuankima	6	0	4+2	0	0	0
46	FW	(India) IND	Rohit Mirza	1	0	1	0	0	0
Players who have made an appearance or had a squad number this season but have left the club
13	FW	(Nigeria) NGA	Joel Sunday	4	3	3+1	3	0	0
7	FW	(Grenada) GRN	Antonio German	6	2	6	2	0	0
11	FW	(Ivory Coast) CIV	Arthur Kouassi	2	0	0+2	0	0	0
21	MF	(India) IND	Baoringdao Bodo	2	1	1+1	1	0	0
4	DF	(Argentina) ARG	Fabricio Ortiz	12	0	12	0	0	0
27	FW	(Ghana) GHA	Christian Sabah	6	1	5+1	1	0	0
2	FW	(Trinidad and Tobago) TRI	Russell Alfred	3	0	2+1	0	0	0
10	MF	(Uganda) UGA	Musa Mudde	9	1	9	1	0	0
41	FW	(Ghana) GHA	Charles Teiko Folley	3	0	1+2	0	0	0

=== Squad statistics ===
	I-League	Super Cup	Total
Games played	20	0	20
Games won	3	0	3
Games drawn	8	0	8
Games lost	9	0	9
Goals scored	25	0	25
Goals conceded	33	0	33
Goal difference	-8	0	-8
Clean sheets	1	0	1
Goal by Substitute	1	0	1
Yellow cards	38	0	38
Red cards	3	0	3

Players Used: Gokulam Kerala has used a total of 38 different players in all competitions.

=== Goalscorers ===
No.	Pos.	Nation	Name	I-League	Super Cup	Total
7	FW	(Trinidad and Tobago)	Marcus Joseph	7	0	7
~~13~~	FW	(Nigeria)	Joel Sunday	3	0	3
~~7~~	FW	(Grenada)	Antonio German	2	0	2
30	FW	(India)	Rajesh S	2	0	2
15	MF	(India)	Arjun Jayaraj	1	0	1
9	FW	(India)	Suhair V P	1	0	1
17	FW	(India)	Ghani Ahmmed Nigam	1	0	1
21	MF	(India)	Baoringdao Bodo	1	0	1
22	MF	(India)	Pritam Singh	1	0	1
~~27~~	FW	(Ghana)	Christian Sabah	1	0	1
~~27~~	FW	(Uganda)	Musa Mudde	1	0	1
~~27~~	FW	(Ghana)	Daniel Addo	1	0	1
Own Goals				3	0	3
TOTAL				25	0	25

=== Clean sheets ===
No.	Nation	Name	I-League	Super Cup	Total	Games played
42	(India)	Shibinraj Kunniyil	1	0	1	10
29	(India)	Arnab Das Sharma	0	0	0	10
TOTAL			1	0	1	20

=== Disciplinary record ===
No.	Pos.	Nation	Name	I-League			Super Cup			Total		
No.	Pos.	Nation	Name	Yellow card	Second yellow card	Red card	Yellow card	Second yellow card	Red card	Yellow card	Second yellow card	Red card
16	FW	(India)	Salman K	1	0	0	0	0	0	1	0	0
3	DF	(India)	Deepak kumar	2	0	0	0	0	0	2	0	0
8	MF	(Brazil)	Guilherme Batata	5	0	1	0	0	0	5	0	1
~~4~~	DF	(Argentina)	Fabricio Ortiz	4	0	0	0	0	0	4	0	0
22	MF	(India)	Pritam Singh	3	0	0	0	0	0	3	0	0
9	FW	(India)	Suhair V P	1	0	0	0	0	0	1	0	0
~~10~~	MF	(Uganda)	Musa Mudde	2	0	1	0	0	0	2	0	1
5	DF	(Ghana)	Daniel Addo	5	0	0	0	0	0	5	0	0
42	GK	(India)	Shibinraj Kunniyil	3	0	0	0	0	0	3	0	0
~~27~~	FW	(Ghana)	Christian Sabah	1	0	0	0	0	0	1	0	0
12	MF	(India)	Muhammed Rashid	1	0	0	0	0	0	1	0	0
29	GK	(India)	Arnab Das Sharma	1	0	0	0	0	0	1	0	0
3	DF	(India)	Dimple Bhagat	1	0	0	0	0	0	1	0	0
15	MF	(India)	Arjun Jayaraj	0	0	1	0	0	0	1	0	0
7	FW	(Trinidad and Tobago)	Marcus Joseph	4	0	0	0	0	0	4	0	0
23	MF	(India)	Imran Khan	1	0	0	0	0	0	1	0	0
4	DF	(Trinidad and Tobago)	Andre Ettienne	1	0	0	0	0	0	1	0	0
27	FW	(Nigeria)	Ejiogu Emmanual	1	0	0	0	0	0	1	0	0
28	DF	(India)	Monotosh Chakladar	1	0	0	0	0	0	1	0	0
TOTAL				38	0	3	0	0	0	38	0	3

== Competitions ==
Win Draw Loss

=== Overview ===
Competition	First match	Last match	Starting round	Record							
Competition	First match	Last match	Starting round	Pld	W	D	L	GF	GA	GD	Win %
I League	27 October 2018	03 March 2019	Matchday 1	20	3	8	9	25	33	−8	15.00
Super Cup				0	0	0	0	0	0	+0	—
Total				20	3	8	9	25	33	−8	15.00

Last updated: 15 December 2018.
Source: Competitions

=== I-League ===
==== Standings ====
Pos	Team	Pld	W	D	L	GF	GA	GD	Pts	Qualification or relegation
7	Aizawl	20	6	6	8	27	28	−1	24	
8	Indian Arrows	20	6	3	11	19	28	−9	21	
9	Minerva Punjab	20	4	6	10	10	19	−9	18 (Note: The game between Minerva Punjab and Real Kashmir was rescheduled, but eventually it was not played and both teams were awarded a point.)	
10	Gokulam Kerala	20	3	8	9	25	33	−8	17	
11	Shillong Lajong (R)	20	3	2	15	23	56	−33	11	Relegation to I-League 2nd Division (withdrew)

Source: I-league
Rules for classification: 1) points; 2) head-to-head points; 3) head-to-head goal difference; 4) goal difference; 5) number of goals scored; 6) drawing of lots
(R) Relegated

==== Results summary ====
Overall								Home						Away					
Pld	W	D	L	GF	GA	GD	Pts	W	D	L	GF	GA	GD	W	D	L	GF	GA	GD
15	2	6	7	19	25	−6	12	2	3	1	9	7	+2	0	3	6	10	18	−8

Last updated: 15 December 2018.
Source: Matchday

==== Results by round ====
Round	1	2	3	4	5	6	7	8	9	10	11	12	13	14	15	16	17	18	19	20
Ground	H	A	H	H	H	H	A	H	A	A	A	A	A	A	A	H	A	H	H	H
Result	D	D	L	W	W	D	L	D	L	L	L	L	D	D	L	D	D	L	W	L
Position	6	5	6	4	2	3	7	6	8	8	8	8	9	10	10	10	10	10	9	9

A = Away; H = Home; W = Win; D = Draw; L = Loss

Last updated: 15 December 2018.
Source: Matchday

==== Matchday ====
27 October 2018 1	Gokulam Kerala	1-1	Mohun Bagan	Calicut,
17:00 IST (UTC+05:30)	SALMAN (yellow card) 21'; DEEPAK (yellow card) 39'; CASTRO (yellow card) 61'; ARJUN 71'	Report	Kisekka 40'	Stadium: EMS Corporation Stadium; Attendance: 28,437; Referee: Maria Joseph Arokia

31 October 2018 2	NEROCA	1-1	Gokulam Kerala	Imphal,
14:00 IST (UTC+05:30)	Ferreira 59'; Felix (yellow card) 82'	Report	B.BODO 45'; ORTIZ (yellow card) 70'	Stadium: Khuman Lampak Stadium; Attendance: 22,415; Referee: Williams Joy Koshy

4 November 2018 3	Gokulam Kerala	2-3	Chennai City	Calicut,
17:00 IST (UTC+05:30)	GERMAN 4'; PRITAM (yellow card) 25'; CASTRO (yellow card) 39'; SUHAIR 70'; MUDDE MUSA (red card) 90+7'	Report	Pravitto Raju 22'; Pedro Manzi 31'; Roberto E (yellow card) 43'; Ameerudeen 69'	Stadium: EMS Corporation Stadium; Attendance: 18,882; Referee: Crystal john

11 November 2018 4	Gokulam Kerala	3-1	Shillong Lajong	Calicut,
17:00 IST (UTC+05:30)	GANI 43'; ORTIZ (yellow card) 45+2'; GERMAN 56'; RAJESH 66'	Report	Lalroua (yellow card) 5'; NOVIN (yellow card) 42' (yellow-red card) 90+4'; P.BUAM 78'	Stadium: EMS Corporation Stadium; Attendance: 15,672; Referee: Parmanand Jaganath Mandrekar

18 November 2018 5	Gokulam Kerala	1-0	Minerva Punjab	Calicut,
19:00 IST (UTC+07:30)	RAJESH 60'; SUHAIR (yellow card) 72'	Report	Akasdeep Singh (yellow card) 19'; Philip Njoku (yellow card) 45+20'; Souvik Das (yellow card) 79'	Stadium: EMS Corporation Stadium; Attendance: 30246; Referee: Senthil Nathan

30 November 2018 6	Gokulam Kerala	1-1	Churchill Brothers	Calicut,
17:00 IST (UTC+05:30)	Arjun Jayaraj 38'	Report	Willis Plaza 5'	Stadium: EMS Corporation Stadium; Attendance: 27,854; Referee: Umesh Bora

8 December 2018 7	East Bengal	3-1	Gokulam Kerala	Kolkata,
17:00 IST (UTC+05:30)	Brandon 5'; Jobby 15'; Chullova (yellow card) 63', (goal) 81'; Di Dika (yellow card) 76'	Report	Deepak (yellow card) 24'; Sabah 57'; Guilherme (yellow card) 76'	Stadium: Salt Lake Stadium; Attendance: 14,999; Referee: Priyobarta Singh Langpoklakpam

15 December 2018 8	Gokulam Kerala	1-1	Real Kashmir	Calicut,
17:00 IST (UTC+05:30)	PRITAM 20'; ORTIZ (yellow card) 60'	Report	S. CHANDAM 69'; ABEDNEGO (yellow card) 90+2'	Stadium: EMS Corporation Stadium; Attendance: 13,824; Referee: M Sugandar

21 December 2018 9	Indian Arrows	1-0	Gokulam Kerala	Odisha,
17:00 IST (UTC+05:30)	Amarjit Singh Kiyam 66'	Report		Stadium: Kalinga Stadium; Attendance: 2,010

29 December 2018 10
17:00 IST (UTC+05:30)
Aizawl
- Ansumana Kromah 51'

*Lalkhawpuimawia 63'

*Rochharzela 70'
3-2
Report
Gokulam Kerala
Joel Sunday 90+3' 90+4'
Aizawl,
Stadium: Rajiv Gandhi Stadium
Attendance: 5,432

4 January 2018 11	Chennai City	3-2	Gokulam Kerala	Coimbatore,
19:30 IST (UTC+07:30)	Pedro Manzi 7' 59' 80'	Report	Musa Mudde 17'Joel Sunday 38'	Stadium: Jawaharlal Nehru Stadium (Coimbatore)

10 January 2018 12	Churchill Brothers	3-1	Gokulam Kerala	Goa,
17:00 IST (UTC+05:00)	Dawda 37'Willis Plaza 57' 90+1'	Report	Marcus Joseph 14'	Stadium: Tilak Maidan Stadium

19 January 2018 13	Minerva Punjab	1-1	Gokulam Kerala	Chandigarh,
17:00 IST (UTC+02:00)	Caicedo Rodriguez 90+4'	Report	Caicedo Rodriguez(OG) 83'	Stadium: Tau Devi Lal Stadium (Panchkula)

10 January 2018 14	Mohun Bagan	2-2	Gokulam Kerala	Kolkata,
17:00 IST (UTC+02:00)	Shilton D'Silva 18'Dipanda Dicka 60'	Report	Lalchhawnkima(OG) 21'Marcus Joseph 24'	Stadium: Salt Lake Stadium; Attendance: 4,000

6 February 2019 15	Real Kashmir	0-1	Gokulam Kerala	Srinagar,
17:00 IST (UTC+02:00)	Gnohere Krizo 51'	Report		Stadium: TRC Turf Ground

16 February 2019 16	Gokulam Kerala	1-1	Indian Arrows	Calicut,
17:00 IST (UTC+05:00)	Marcus Joseph 64'	Report	Rahul Praveen 22'	Stadium: EMS Stadium

22 February 2019 17	Shillong Lajong	1-1	Gokulam Kerala	Shillong,
17:00 IST (UTC+05:00)	Samuel Lalmuanpuia(P) 65'	Report	Marcus Joseph 43'	Stadium: Jawaharlal Nehru Stadium (Shillong)

28 February 2019 18	Gokulam Kerala	1-3	Aizawl	Calicut,
17:00 IST (UTC+03:30)	Marcus Joseph 9'	Report	Paul Ramfangzauva 83'Lalkhawpuimawia 88'Ansumana Kromah 90+7'	Stadium: EMS Stadium

3 March 2019 19	Gokulam Kerala	2-1	NEROCA	Calicut,
17:00 IST (UTC+05:00)	Daniel Addo 46'Marcus Joseph 65'	Report	Felix Chidi Odili 23'	Stadium: EMS Stadium

9 March 2019 20	Gokulam Kerala	1-2	East Bengal	Calicut,
17:00 IST (UTC+05:00)	Marcus Joseph 69'	Report	Jaime Santos(P) 79'Laldanmawia Ralte 85'	Stadium: EMS Stadium

== See also ==
- 2018–19 in Indian football
- 2018–19 I-League
