= 2017–18 Gokulam Kerala FC season =

Indian football club season

Gokulam Kerala
2017–18 season
- Chairman: Gokulam Gopalan
- Head Coach: Bino George
- Stadium: EMS Corporation Stadium, Calicut, Kerala
- I-League: 7th
- Super Cup: Round of 16
- Top goalscorer: League: Henry Kisekka (4); All: Henry Kisekka (7)
- Highest home attendance: 25,841 vs Chennai City (4 December 2017).
- Lowest home attendance: 621 vs Shillong Lajong (28 January 2018)
- Average home league attendance: 8,131
Home colours	Away colours

The 2017–18 season was the first ever season for Gokulam Kerala. The club competed in I-League and Super Cup.

== Review and events ==
=== Pre-season ===
Gokulam Kerala played 2016–17 Kerala Premier League in pre-season. They started the campaign with a victory over Cochin Port Trust on 13 April 2017. They qualified to knockout Stage as group champions from Group A. But they lost against FC Thrissur in semi-final on penalties.

=== I-League ===
Gokulam Kerala debuted in I-League against Shillong Lajong on 21 November 2017 and they lost the match. Their first win was in their 4th match against Indian Arrows on 22 December 2017. With 21 points including 6 wins, 3 draws and 9 losses Gokulam Kerala finished 7th in the table.

=== Indian Super Cup ===
By finishing 7th in the 2017–18 I-League point table Gokulam Kerala qualified into Qualification round of 2018 Indian Super Cup. Gokulam Kerala won against NorthEast United in the qualifier match on 15 March 2018. Bengaluru FC eliminated Gokulam Kerala in Pre Quarter on 1 April 2018

== Players ==
As of 1 January 2018

=== First-team squad ===
Note: Flags indicate national team as defined under FIFA eligibility rules; some limited exceptions apply. Players may hold more than one non-FIFA nationality.

No.	Pos.	Nation	Player
1	GK	IND	Nikhil C Barnard
2	DF	IND	Mohamed Salah
3	DF	NGR	Emmanuel Chigozie
4	DF	IND	Provat Lakra (U-22)
5	DF	GHA	Daniel Addo
6	DF	IND	Mohamed Irshad
7	DF	IND	Sushanth Mathew (Captain)
8	FW	IND	Suhair V P
9	FW	MKD	Hristijan Denkovski
10	MF	UGA	Musa Mudde
11	MF	BHR	Mahmood Al-Ajmi
12	MF	IND	Mohammad Rashid K
13	FW	IND	Jimshad U
14	DF	IND	Shinu (U-22)
15	MF	IND	Arjun Jayaraj (U-22)
16	FW	IND	Salman K
17	FW	IND	Arif Shaikh
18	DF	IND	Santu Singh

No.	Pos.	Nation	Player
19	MF	IND	Francis Xavier
20	MF	UZB	Gulom Urunov
21	MF	IND	Vicky Meitei (U-22)
22	FW	IND	Usman Ashik
23	FW	IND	Lalramengmawia (U-22)
24	DF	IND	Dibin M D
25	DF	IND	Sanju G
26	MF	IND	Mohammad Saukat (U-22)
27	GK	IND	Bilal Khan
28	FW	IND	Rohit Mirza
29	FW	IND	Syed Shoaib Ahmed (U-22)
30	FW	UGA	Henry Kisekka
31	GK	IND	Priyant Singh
32	FW	IND	Laldampuia
33	GK	IND	Ajmal P A
35	DF	IND	Balwinder Singh
36	FW	IND	Kivi Zhimomi (U-22)

=== Players in ===
All players joined this season. Only winter transfer is listed.

No.	Pos.	Nation	Name	Age	Moving From	Window
8	FW	(India)	Suhair V P	25	(India) East Bengal	Winter
~~9~~	FW	(Nigeria)	Odafa Onyeka Okolie	32	(India) Southern Samity	Winter
9	FW	(North Macedonia)	Hristijan Denkovski	23	(Spain) CD Ferriolense	Winter
10	MF	(Uganda)	Musa Mudde	27	(Kenya) A.F.C. Leopards	Winter
11	MF	(Bahrain)	Mahmood Al-Ajmi	30	(Bahrain) Manama Club	Winter
30	FW	(Uganda)	Henry Kisekka	28	(Vietnam) XSKT Cần Thơ	Winter
	DF	(India)	Jestin George	19		Winter

=== Players out ===
No.	Pos.	Nation	Name	Age	Moving To	Window
8	FW	(Ivory Coast)	Kamo Stephane Bayi	21	Mohammedan S.C.	Winter
9	FW	(Democratic Republic of the Congo)	Lelo Mbele	30	Free Agent	Winter
9	FW	(Nigeria)	Odafa Onyeka Okolie	32	Free Agent	Winter
10	MF	(Cameroon)	Francis Ambané	33	Free Agent	Winter
11	MF	(Syria)	Khaled Al Saleh	29	Free Agent	Winter

== Statistics ==
=== Squad appearances and goals ===
No.	Pos	Nat	Player	Total		I-League		Super Cup	
No.	Pos	Nat	Player	Apps	Goals	Apps	Goals	Apps	Goals
Goalkeepers
1	GK	(India) IND	Nikhil C Barnard	7	0	5	0	2	0
27	GK	(India) IND	Bilal Khan	13	0	13	0	0	0
31	GK	(India) IND	Priyant Singh	0	0	0	0	0	0
33	GK	(India) IND	Ajmal P A	0	0	0	0	0	0
Defenders
2	DF	(India) IND	Mohamed Salah	9	0	3+6	0	0	0
3	DF	(Nigeria) NGR	Emmanuel Chigozie	17	1	15	1	2	0
4	DF	(India) IND	Provat Lakra	17	0	15	0	2	0
5	DF	(Ghana) GHA	Daniel Addo	19	2	17	2	2	0
6	DF	(India) IND	Mohamed Irshad	17	0	13+2	0	2	0
7	DF	(India) IND	Sushanth Mathew	7	0	3+3	0	0+1	0
14	DF	(India) IND	Shinu	5	0	1+3	0	0+1	0
18	DF	(India) IND	Santu Singh	9	1	9	1	0	0
24	DF	(India) IND	Dibin M D	2	0	2	0	0	0
25	DF	(India) IND	Sanju G	0	0	0	0	0	0
35	DF	(India) IND	Balwinder Singh	6	0	3+3	0	0	0
Midfielders
10	MF	(Uganda) UGA	Musa Mudde	11	0	9	0	2	0
11	MF	(Bahrain) BHR	Mahmood Al-Ajmi	11	3	8+2	3	1	0
12	MF	(India) IND	Mohammad Rashid K	16	0	13+1	0	2	0
15	MF	(India) IND	Arjun Jayaraj	17	1	10+5	1	1+1	0
19	MF	(India) IND	Francis Xavier	3	0	2+1	0	0	0
20	MF	(Uzbekistan) UZB	Gulom Urunov	1	0	1	0	0	0
21	MF	(India) IND	Vicky Meitei	9	0	5+4	0	0	0
26	MF	(India) IND	Mohammad Saukat	1	0	0+1	0	0	0
Forwards
8	FW	(India) IND	Suhair V P	1	0	0	0	1	0
9	FW	(North Macedonia) MKD	Hristijan Denkovski	2	0	0	0	1+1	0
13	FW	(India) IND	Jimshad U	4	0	1+3	0	0	0
16	FW	(India) IND	Salman K	12	0	10	0	2	0
17	FW	(India) IND	Arif Shaikh	8	0	1+7	0	0	0
22	FW	(India) IND	Usman Ashik	6	0	2+4	0	0	0
23	FW	(India) IND	Lalramengmawia	0	0	0	0	0	0
28	FW	(India) IND	Rohit Mirza	3	0	3	0	0	0
29	FW	(India) IND	Syed Shoaib Ahmed	1	0	0+1	0	0	0
30	FW	(Uganda) UGA	Henry Kisekka	9	7	7	4	2	3
32	FW	(India) IND	Laldampuia	5	0	4+1	0	0	0
36	FW	(India) IND	Kivi Zhimomi	11	2	8+3	2	0	0
Players who have made an appearance or had a squad number this season but have left the club
8	FW	(Ivory Coast) CIV	Kamo Stephane Bayi	3	1	3	1	0	0
9	FW	(Democratic Republic of the Congo) COD	Lelo Mbele	3	0	3	0	0	0
9	FW	(Nigeria) NGR	Odafa Onyeka Okolie	3	0	3	0	0	0
10	MF	(Cameroon) CMR	Francis Ambané	3	0	1+2	0	0	0
11	MF	(Syria) SYR	Khaled Al Saleh	5	1	5	1	0	0

=== Squad statistics ===
	I-League	Super Cup	Total
Games played	18	2	20
Games won	6	1	7
Games drawn	3	0	3
Games lost	9	1	10
Goals scored	17	3	20
Goals conceded	23	2	25
Goal difference	-6	1	-5
Clean sheets	3	1	4
Goal by Substitute	1	0	1
Yellow cards	32	4	36
Red cards	2	0	2

Players Used: Gokulam Kerala has used a total of 40 different players in all competitions.

=== Goalscorers ===
No.	Pos.	Nation	Name	I-League	Super Cup	Total
30	FW	(Uganda)	Henry Kisekka	4	3	7
11	MF	(Bahrain)	Al-Ajmi	3	0	3
5	DF	(Ghana)	Daniel Addo	2	0	2
36	FW	(India)	Kivi Zhimomi	2	0	2
3	DF	(Nigeria)	Emmanuel	1	0	1
15	MF	(India)	Arjun Jayaraj	1	0	1
18	DF	(India)	Santu Singh	1	0	1
~~8~~	FW	(Ivory Coast)	Kamo	1	0	1
~~11~~	MF	(Syria)	Khaled Al Saleh	1	0	1
Own goals				1	0	1
TOTAL				17	3	20

=== Clean sheets ===
No.	Nation	Name	I-League	Super Cup	Total	Games played
27	(India)	Bilal Khan	3	0	3	13
1	(India)	Nikhil C Barnard	0	1	1	7
TOTAL			3	0	4	20

=== Disciplinary record ===
No.	Pos.	Nation	Name	I-League			Super Cup			Total		
No.	Pos.	Nation	Name	Yellow card	Second yellow card	Red card	Yellow card	Second yellow card	Red card	Yellow card	Second yellow card	Red card
28	FW	(India)	Rohit Mirza	0	0	1	0	0	0	0	0	1
6	DF	(India)	Mohamed Irshad	4	1	0	0	0	0	4	1	0
3	DF	(Nigeria)	Emmanuel	5	0	0	0	0	0	5	0	0
5	DF	(Ghana)	Daniel Addo	5	0	0	0	0	0	5	0	0
10	MF	(Uganda)	Musa Mudde	4	0	0	1	0	0	5	0	0
12	MF	(India)	M.Rashid	2	0	0	0	0	0	2	0	0
36	FW	(India)	Kivi Zhimomi	2	0	0	0	0	0	2	0	0
16	FW	(India)	Salman K	1	0	0	1	0	0	2	0	0
30	FW	(Uganda)	Henry Kisekka	1	0	0	1	0	0	2	0	0
4	DF	(India)	Provat Lakra	1	0	0	0	0	0	1	0	0
14	DF	(India)	Shinu	1	0	0	0	0	0	1	0	0
15	MF	(India)	Arjun Jayaraj	1	0	0	0	0	0	1	0	0
18	DF	(India)	Santu Singh	1	0	0	0	0	0	1	0	0
19	MF	(India)	Francis Xavier	1	0	0	0	0	0	1	0	0
21	MF	(India)	Vicky Meitei	1	0	0	0	0	0	1	0	0
35	DF	(India)	Balwinder Singh	1	0	0	0	0	0	1	0	0
9	FW	(North Macedonia)	Hristijan Denkovski	0	0	0	1	0	0	1	0	0
~~10~~	MF	(Cameroon)	A.Francis	1	0	0	0	0	0	1	0	0
TOTAL				32	1	1	4	0	0	36	1	1

== Competitions ==
Win Draw Loss

=== Overview ===
Competition	First match	Last match	Starting round	Final position	Record							
Competition	First match	Last match	Starting round	Final position	Pld	W	D	L	GF	GA	GD	Win %
I-League	27 November 2017	8 March 2018	Matchday 1	7th	18	6	3	9	17	23	−6	33.33
Total					18	6	3	9	17	23	−6	33.33

Source: Competitions

=== I-League ===
==== Standings ====
Pos	Team	Pld	W	D	L	GF	GA	GD	Pts
5	Aizawl	18	6	6	6	21	18	+3	24
6	Shillong Lajong	18	6	4	8	17	25	−8	22
7	Gokulam Kerala	18	6	3	9	17	23	−6	21
8	Chennai City	18	4	7	7	15	24	−9	19
9	Churchill Brothers (Note: Churchill Brothers were relegated, but reinstated after the appeal.)	18	5	2	11	17	28	−11	17

Source: i-league.org
Rules for classification: 1) points; 2) head-to-head points; 3) head-to-head goal difference; 4) goal difference; 5) number of goals scored; 6) drawing of lots

==== Results summary ====
Overall								Home						Away					
Pld	W	D	L	GF	GA	GD	Pts	W	D	L	GF	GA	GD	W	D	L	GF	GA	GD
18	6	3	9	17	23	−6	21	2	2	5	9	15	−6	4	1	4	8	8	0

Source: Matchday

==== Results by round ====
Round	1	2	3	4	5	6	7	8	9	10	11	12	13	14	15	16	17	18
Ground	A	H	H	A	A	H	H	H	H	A	H	A	A	H	A	A	A	H
Result	L	D	L	W	L	L	L	L	L	W	W	L	W	W	W	D	L	D

Source: Matchday
A = Away; H = Home; W = Win; D = Draw; L = Loss

==== Matchday ====
27 November 2017 1	Shillong Lajong	1-0	Gokulam Kerala	Shillong, India
20:00 IST (UTC+05:30)	Lakra 78' (o.g.)	Report	Addo (yellow card) 23'; Shinu (yellow card) 72'	Stadium: Jawaharlal Nehru Stadium; Attendance: 6,900; Referee: Akash Jackson Routh

4 December 2017 2	Gokulam Kerala	1-1	Chennai City	Calicut, India
20:00 IST (UTC+05:30)	Kamo 21'; A.FRANCIS (yellow card) 24'	Report	JUNIOR 28'	Stadium: EMS Corporation Stadium; Attendance: 25,841; Referee: Rosario Fernandes

9 December 2017 3	Gokulam Kerala	0-3	NEROCA	Calicut, India
14:00 IST (UTC+05:30)		Report	ODILI.F 24'; PRITAM 43'; RONALD 90+6'	Stadium: EMS Corporation Stadium; Attendance: 9,952; Referee: Pratik Mondal

22 December 2017 4	Indian Arrows	0-2	Gokulam Kerala	Delhi, India
14:00 IST (UTC+05:30)	J.Aniket (yellow card) 30'; Stalin (yellow card) 64'; A.Haldar (yellow card) 79'	Report	Addo 11'; Khaled 65'; Lakra (yellow card) 90+1'	Stadium: Ambedkar Stadium; Attendance: 3,701; Referee: Rahul Kumar Gupta

27 December 2017 5	East Bengal	1-0	Gokulam Kerala	Kolkata, India
20:00 IST (UTC+05:30)	Rafique 44'	Report	Rohit (red card) 54'; Emmanuel (yellow card) 85'	Stadium: Salt Lake Stadium; Attendance: 9,983; Referee: Umesh Bora

31 December 2017 6	Gokulam Kerala	0-2	Aizawl	Calicut, India
14:00 IST (UTC+05:30)	Irshad (yellow card) 45+2'; Santu (yellow card) 68'	Report	Yugo 45'; Andrei 52'; Dinliana (yellow card) 90+2'	Stadium: EMS Corporation Stadium; Attendance: 3,720; Referee: Priyobarta Singh Langpoklakpam

6 January 2018 7	Gokulam Kerala	0-1	Minerva Punjab	Calicut, India
17:30 IST (UTC+05:30)	Kivi (yellow card) 51'; Emmanuel (yellow card) 76'; Addo (yellow card) 84'	Report	BALI 19'	Stadium: EMS Corporation Stadium; Attendance: 4,534; Referee: Senthil Nathan S

12 January 2018 8	Gokulam Kerala	0-1	Indian Arrows	Calicut, India
17:30 IST (UTC+05:30)		Report	K.Amarjit (yellow card) 54'; Abhijit 77'	Stadium: EMS Corporation Stadium; Attendance: 8,355; Referee: Tanmoy Dhar

15 January 2018 9	Gokulam Kerala	2-3	Churchill Brothers	Calicut, India
20:00 IST (UTC+05:30)	Emmanuel (yellow card) 40' (goal) 70'; Addo 59' (yellow card) 59'; FRANCIS (yellow card) 85'; Vicky (yellow card) 86'	Report	Kalu 16', 74'; Nicholas (yellow card) 22'; Koffi 90+2'	Stadium: EMS Corporation Stadium; Attendance: 6,325; Referee: R Palmson Moses Raj

20 January 2018 10	Chennai City	0-1	Gokulam Kerala	Coimbatore, India
17:30 IST (UTC+05:30)	Veniamin Shumeyko (yellow card) 83'	Report	Santu 60'; Salman (yellow card) 70'; Kivi (yellow card) 83'	Stadium: Jawaharlal Nehru Stadium, Coimbatore; Attendance: 8,762; Referee: Rabichandra Singh Irengbam

28 January 2018 11	Gokulam Kerala	3-2	Shillong Lajong	Calicut, India
14:00 IST (UTC+05:30)	ALAJMI 52'; Addo (yellow card) 61'; Kivi 74'; Arjun 90'; Musa (yellow card) 90+2'	Report	KOFFI 25'; JUHO 53'	Stadium: EMS Corporation Stadium; Attendance: 621; Referee: Pranjal Banerjee

4 February 2018 12	NEROCA	1-0	Gokulam Kerala	Imphal, India
14:30 IST (UTC+05:30)	KIATAMBA.JR 43'	Report		Stadium: Khuman Lampak Main Stadium; Attendance: 17,300; Referee: Senthil Nathan S

12 February 2018 13	Mohun Bagan	1-2	Gokulam Kerala	Kolkata, India
14:00 IST (UTC+05:30)	NIKHIL (yellow card) 17'; D'DICKA (yellow card) 73', (goal) 78'	Report	ALAJMI 76'; Henry 90'	Stadium: Salt Lake Stadium; Attendance: 4,360; Referee: R Palmson Moses Raj

17 February 2018 14	Gokulam Kerala	2-1	East Bengal	Calicut, India
14:00 IST (UTC+05:30)	Kivi 51'; Irshad (yellow card) 55' (yellow-red card) 90+1'; Emmanuel (yellow card) 71'; Salam 88' (o.g.)	Report	Katsumi (yellow card) 39', (goal) 45+5' (pen.); Arnab (yellow card) 90+1' (yellow-red card) 90+6'; Chullova (yellow card) 90+1'	Stadium: EMS Corporation Stadium; Attendance: 3,257; Referee: Rahul Kumar Gupta

20 February 2018 15	Minerva Punjab	0-1	Gokulam Kerala	Panchkula, India
14:00 IST (UTC+05:30)	RANDEEP (yellow card) 4'	Report	Rashi (yellow card) 16'; Musa (yellow card) 19'; Balwinder (yellow card) 42'; Henry 75'	Stadium: Tau Devi Lal Stadium; Attendance: 3,890; Referee: R Palmson Moses Raj

24 February 2018 16	Churchill Brothers	1-1	Gokulam Kerala	Salcete, India
17:30 IST (UTC+05:30)	Cessay (yellow card) 87'; Bektur (yellow card) 89'; Francis 90+2'	Report	Arjun (yellow card) 59'; Henry 72'; Musa (yellow card) 87'	Stadium: Tilak Maidan Stadium; Attendance: 2,785; Referee: Senthil Nathan S

2 March 2018 17	Aizawl	3-1	Gokulam Kerala	Aizawl, India
14:00 IST (UTC+05:30)	Saighani (yellow card) 43'; Dodoz (yellow card) 57', (goal) 59', 74'; Mapuia 78'	Report	ALAJMI 25' (pen.); Rashi (yellow card) 55'; Emmanuel (yellow card) 83'	Stadium: Rajiv Gandhi Stadium; Attendance: 2,800; Referee: Crystal John

8 March 2018 18	Gokulam Kerala	1-1	Mohun Bagan	Calicut, India
15:00 IST (UTC+05:30)	Henry 45+1', (yellow card) 64'; Irshad (yellow card) 50'; Addo (yellow card) 78'; Musa (yellow card) 84'	Report	D'DICKA 25'; NIKHIL (yellow card) 84'	Stadium: EMS Corporation Stadium; Attendance: 9,572; Referee: C. R. Srikrishna

=== Indian Super Cup ===
==== Qualification round ====
15 March 2018	NorthEast United	0-2	Gokulam Kerala	Bhubaneswar, India
20:00 IST (UTC+05:30)	Lalrindika (yellow card) 9'	Report	Kisekka 43', 74', (yellow card) 44'; Salman (yellow card) 71'; Hristijan (yellow card) 90+3'	Stadium: Kalinga Stadium; Attendance: 1,500; Referee: Tejas Nagvenkar

==== Round of 16 ====
1 April 2018	Bengaluru	2-1	Gokulam Kerala	Bhubaneswar, India
17:00 IST (UTC+05:30)	Miku 69'; U. Singh 90+2'	Report	Kisekka 33'; Musa (yellow card) 64'	Stadium: Kalinga Stadium; Attendance: 4,233; Referee: Tejas Nagvenkar

== See also ==
- 2017–18 in Indian football
- 2017–18 I-League
