= 2017–18 Kerala Premier League =

5th season of Kerala Premier League

Kerala Premier League
- Season: 2017–18 (5th Season)
- Champions: Gokulam Kerala (1st title)
- Matches: 44
- Goals: 164 (3.73 per match)
- Top goalscorer: (Ghana) Emmanuel Aidoo (12 goals)
- Biggest home win: Kerala Blasters FC Reserves 6–0 Cochin Port Trust (30 May 2018)
- Biggest away win: Cochin Port Trust 1–7 Kerala Blasters FC Reserves (7 May 2018)
- Highest scoring: Cochin Port Trust 1–7 Kerala Blasters FC Reserves (7 May 2018)
- All statistics correct as of 10 June 2018.

The 2017–18 Kerala Premier League Season was the fifth season of the Kerala Premier League. The season featured 10 teams which was divided into 2 groups with each having 5 and is played on a home-and-away format. The season kicked off on 7 April 2018.

== Teams ==
Locations of the 2017–18 Kerala Premier League teams

On 4 April 2018, it was announced that the then last champion KSEB pulled from the 2017–18 season citing financial reason. Another PSU team AG'S Office also pulled out due to internal departmental issues. Kerala Blasters FC Reserves and Quartz FC were added making 2017–18 season a 10-team affair.

=== Stadiums and locations ===
Team	Stadium	Capacity
Central Excise	Ambedkar Stadium, Ernakulam	10,000
SBI Kerala	Ambedkar Stadium, Ernakulam	10,000
Cochin Port Trust	Veli Ground, Fort Kochi	-
FC Kerala	Thrissur Municipal Corporation Stadium	15,000
FC Thrissur	Thrissur Municipal Corporation Stadium	15,000
Gokulam Kerala FC	EMS Stadium	85,000
Quartz FC	EMS Stadium	85,000
Kerala Police	Kottappadi Football Stadium, Malappuram	10,000
Sports Academy Tirur	Rajiv Gandhi Municipal Stadium, Tirur	–
Kerala Blasters FC Reserves	Sports Council Ground, Panampilly Nagar, Kochi	-

== Results ==
=== League table ===
==== Group A ====
Pos	Team	Pld	W	D	L	GF	GA	GD	Pts	Qualification
1	FC Thrissur	8	6	1	1	16	7	+9	19	Advance to Semi-finals
2	Sports Academy Tirur	8	5	1	2	16	11	+5	16	Advance to Semi-finals
3	Kerala Blasters FC Reserves	8	5	0	3	27	10	+17	15	
4	Kerala Police	8	3	0	5	12	14	−2	9	
5	Cochin Port Trust	8	0	0	8	4	33	−29	0	

Source: KFA

==== Group B ====
Pos	Team	Pld	W	D	L	GF	GA	GD	Pts	Qualification
1	Gokulam Kerala FC	8	7	0	1	23	9	+14	21	Advance to Semi-finals
2	Quartz SC	8	5	1	2	17	16	+1	16	Advance to Semi-finals
3	FC Kerala	8	3	3	2	19	14	+5	12	
4	SBI Kerala	8	1	1	6	12	21	−9	4	
5	Central Excise	8	1	1	6	9	20	−11	4	

Source: KFA

=== Knockout stage ===
Semi-finals
A1	FC Thrissur	2
B2	Quartz SC	4
A2	Sports Academy Tirur	0
B1	Gokulam Kerala FC	1

Final
Quartz SC	0
Gokulam Kerala FC	2

=== Fixtures and results ===
Source: Fanport

7 April 2018	FC Thrissur	2–1	Kerala Blasters FC Reserves	Thrissur
16:00 IST	Ashik 39' 57'	Report	Shaiborlang Kharpan 8'	Stadium: Corporation Stadium; Attendance: 1015

8 April 2018	Cochin Port Trust	0–2	Kerala Police	Fort Kochi
16:00 IST		Report	Jimshad 52'; Sujil 76'	Stadium: Veli Ground; Attendance: 40

10 April 2018	SBI Kerala	2–0	Central Excise	Ernakulam
16:00 IST	Jojo 50'; Steffi 76'	Report		Stadium: Ambedkar Stadium

11 April 2018	Cochin Port Trust	1–4	FC Thrissur	Fort Kochi
16:00 IST	Bibin 45'	Report	Haris 7'; Ashik 54'; Antony 60'; Ubaid 90+2'	Stadium: Veli Ground

14 April 2018	Quartz SC	2–1	SBI Kerala	Kozhikode
16:00 IST	Vimal Kumar 23' 76'	Report	Stephin Das 26'	Stadium: EMS Corporation Stadium

15 April 2018	Gokulam Kerala	3–1	Central Excise	Kozhikode
16:00 IST	Dinesh Kumar 50'; Sourav 60'; Suhair V P 83'	Report	Mathew Poulose 84'	Stadium: EMS Corporation Stadium

15 April 2018	Sports Academy Tirur	2–0	Cochin Port Trust	Tirur
16:00 IST	Thabseer 45' 90'	Report		Stadium: Rajiv Gandhi Stadium

18 April 2018	Kerala Police	0–1	FC Thrissur	Malappuram
16:00 IST		Report	Haris 64'	Stadium: Kottapadi Stadium

18 April 2018	Central Excise	1–2	Quartz SC	Ernakulam
16:00 IST	Shanna's 68'	Report	Zamthang Mang 52'; Joseph Appiah 81'	Stadium: Ambedkar Stadium

21 April 2018	Central Excise	3–2	SBI Kerala	Ernakulam
16:00 IST	Firshad 26'; Muneer 60'; Md. Rafi 70'	Report	Sajith Poulose 57'; Abdul Noushad 71'	Stadium: Ambedkar Stadium

21 April 2018	Sports Academy Tirur	3–2	Kerala Police	Tirur
16:00 IST	Shashank 45+1'; Unais 47'; Faslu Rahman 76'	Report	Sarath Lal 66' (pen.); Abhijith 72'	Stadium: Rajiv Gandhi Stadium

22 April 2018	FC Thrissur	3–1	Cochin Port Trust	Thrissur
16:00 IST	Sadhik 40'; Ashik (-); Haris (-)	Report	Anoj (-)	Stadium: Corporation Stadium

22 April 2018	Gokulam Kerala FC	4–1	FC Kerala	Kozhikode
16:00 IST	Dinesh Kumar 43' 52'; Suhair V P 46' 90'	Report	Parminder Singh (-)	Stadium: EMS Corporation Stadium

25 April 2018	Quartz SC	3–2	Gokulam Kerala FC	Kozhikode
16:00 IST	Emmanuel Aidoo 20' 50' 55'	Report	Sushanth Mathew (-); Mama (-)	Stadium: EMS Corporation Stadium; Attendance: 70,000

25 April 2018	Sports Academy Tirur	1–1	FC Thrissur	Tirur
16:00 IST	Sashank (-)	Report	Sadhik (-)	Stadium: Rajiv Gandhi Stadium

27 April 2018	Quartz SC	5–1	Central Excise	Kozhikode
16:00 IST	Emmauel Aidoo (-) (-) (-) (-); Ayush (-)	Report	(-)	Stadium: EMS Corporation Stadium

29 April 2018	FC Thrissur	2–1	Kerala Police	Thrissur
16:00 IST	Sadhik 23'; Antony Poulose 79'	Report	Firos 71'	Stadium: Corporation Stadium

29 April 2018	Sports Academy Tirur	4–0	Cochin Port Trust	Tirur
16:00 IST	Shaheed 11'; Unais 53'; Fasalu Rahman 80'; Aslam 90'	Report		Stadium: Rajiv Gandhi Stadium

30 April 2018	Gokulam Kerala	4–1	SBI Kerala	Kozhikode
16:00 IST	Suhair V P 11'; Schubert 43'; Sourav 50'; Lalrameng 80'	Report	Stephin Das (-)	Stadium: EMS Corporation Stadium

2 May 2018	Kerala Police	5–1	Cochin Port Trust	Malappuram
16:00 IST	Firos 22' 26' 64'	Report	Abhijith 32' 56'	Stadium: Kottappadi Stadium

3 May 2018	Kerala Blasters FC Reserves	1–3	FC Thrissur	Malappuram
16:00 IST	Loken Meitei 18'	Report	Harris 40'; Safwan 53' 90+1'	Stadium: Kottappadi Stadium

6 May 2018	Kerala Police	0–3	Sports Academy Tirur	Malappuram
16:00 IST		Report	Thabshir (-); Fasalu Rahman (-); Musammil (-)	Stadium: Kottappadi Stadium

7 May 2018	FC Kerala	6–1	Quartz FC	Thrissur
16:00 IST	Sreyas 6' 11' 40' 76' 85'; Jithin MS 80'	Report	Joseph Appiah (-)	Stadium: Corporation Stadium

7 May 2018	Cochin Port Trust	1–7	Kerala Blasters FC Reserves	Fort Kochi
16:00 IST	Akash (-)	Report	Afdal (-); Shaiborlang (-); Sahal (-); Suhail (-); Sonam (-); Sooraj (-); Rakip (-)	Stadium: Veli Ground

9 May 2018	FC Thrissur	0–1	Sports Academy Tirur	Thrissur
16:00 IST		Report	Shaheed 15'	Stadium: Corporation Stadium

10 May 2018	FC Kerala	2–2	SBI Kerala	Thrissur
16:00 IST	Abdoul Karim Sylla (-); Jithin MS (-)	Report	Sajith Poulose (-); Shibin Lal (-)	Stadium: Corporation Stadium

10 May 2018	Gokulam Kerala FC	2–0	Quartz FC	Kozhikode
16:00 IST	Mohamed Salah 89'; Usman Ashik 91'	Report		Stadium: EMS Corporation Stadium; Attendance: 50,556

12 May 2018^{1}	Central Excise	1–3	Gokulam Kerala FC	Ernakulam
16:00 IST	Muneer (-)	Report	Brian Umony 59' 70'; Lalranmawia (-)	Stadium: Ambedkar Stadium

13 May 2018	SBI Kerala	2–3	Quartz FC	Ernakulam
16:00 IST	Season 72'; Sajith Poulose 74'	Report	Benjamin (-); Emmanuel (-) 73'	Stadium: Ambedkar Stadium

17 May 2018	FC Kerala	1–1	Quartz FC	Kozhikode
16:00 IST	Surjith 48'	Report	Emmanuel 76'	Stadium: EMS Corporation Stadium

18 May 2018	Kerala Police	0–3	Kerala Blasters FC Reserves	Malappuram
16:00 IST		Report	Afdal 29'; Shaiborlang 32' 57'	Stadium: Kottappady Stadium

20 May 2018	Sports Academy Tirur	1–2	Kerala Blasters FC Reserves	Tirur
16:00 IST	Sheheed 34'	Report	Shaiborlang 32' 63'	Stadium: Rajiv Gandhi Stadium

20 May 2018	FC Kerala	1–3	Gokulam Kerala FC	Thrissur
16:00 IST	Raju 61'	Report	Schubert 38'; Usman Ashik 45+1' 87'	Stadium: Corporation Stadium

23 May 2018	Kerala Blasters FC Reserves	1–2	Kerala Police	Ernakulam
16:00 IST	Hrishidath 63'	Report	Abhijith 70'; Aneesh 88'	Stadium: Sports Council Ground, Panambilly Nagar

23 May 2018	FC Kerala	3–2	Central Excise	Thrissur
16:00 IST	Christy Davis 6'; Jithin MS 47'; Sreyas 63'	Report	Mohd. Masood 44'; Sooraj OJ 48'	Stadium: Corporation Stadium

27 May 2018	Kerala Blasters FC Reserves	6–1	Sports Academy Tirur	Ernakulam
16:00 IST	Suraj 2'; Romtan 44'; Sahal 45+1'; Shaiborlang 55'; Afdal VK 63' 69'	Report	Shafeeq 29'	Stadium: Sports Council Ground, Panambilly Nagar

27 May 2018	SBI Kerala	1–5	FC Kerala	Ernakulam
16:00 IST	Seesan 45+2'	Report	Djougo Mike 10' 35'; Parminder Singh 5' 47'; Dahir Bala Hassan 89'	Stadium: Dr. Ambedkar Stadium

29 May 2018	SBI Kerala	1–2	Gokulam Kerala FC	Ernakulam
16:00 IST	Seesan 20'	Report	Shibil 5' 35'; Hristijan Denkovski 66'	Stadium: Dr. Ambedkar Stadium

30 May 2018	Kerala Blasters FC Reserves	6–0	Cochin Port Trust	Ernakulam
16:00 IST	Sooraj 13'; Shaiborlang 17' 19'; Afdal 66' 68'; Ananthu Murali 35'	Report		Stadium: Sports Council Ground, Panambilly Nagar

30 May 2018	Central Excise	0–0	FC Kerala	Ernakulam
16:00 IST		[fanport.in/football/kerala-premier-league/excisie-fc-kerala-draw-kpl-2017/ Report]		Stadium: Dr. Ambedkar Stadium

Semi-Finals

1 June 2018	FC Thrissur	2–4	Quartz FC	Thrissur
16:00 IST	Mohd. Sameer 63' 68'	Report	Thahir Zaman 8'; Mohd. Zavad 27'; Emmanuel Aidoo 35' 37'	Stadium: Corporation Stadium; Attendance: 25,000

1 June 2018	Sports Academy Tirur	0–1	Gokulam Kerala FC	Ernakulam
16:00 IST		Report	Schubert 97'	Stadium: Sports Council Ground, Panambilly Nagar

Final

3 June 2018	Quartz FC	0-2	Gokulam Kerala FC	Thrissur
15:00 IST			Dinesh Kumar 69'; Dinesh Kumar 87'	Stadium: Corporation Stadium; Attendance: 15,000

^{1} Later shifted to 13 May 2018 due to bad weather conditions

== Season statistics ==
As of 15 April 2018

=== Top scorers ===
Rank	Player	Club	Goals
1	(Ghana) Emmanuel Aidoo	Quartz SC	12
2	(India) Shaiborlang Kharpan	Kerala Blasters FC Reserves	8
3	(India) Shreyas VG	FC Kerala	6
3	(India) Afdal	Kerala Blasters FC Reserves	6
4	(India) Dinesh Kumar	Gokulam kerala FC	5
4	(India) Usman Ashik	Gokulam Kerala FC	4
4	(India) V P Suhair	Gokulam Kerala FC	4
4	(India) Firos	Kerala Police	4

== I-League 2nd Division Qualified teams ==
- Quartz FC
- F.C. Kerala
