= Henry Kisekka =

Ugandan footballer (born 1989)

Personal information
- Full name: Henry Kisekka
- Date of birth: 31 August 1989 (age 37)
- Place of birth: Kampala, Uganda
- Height: 1.82 m (6 ft 0 in)
- Position: Forward

Youth career
- –2008: SC Villa

Senior career*
| Years | Team | Apps | (Gls) |
| 2008–2011 | URA Kampala | | |
| 2011 | Hòa Phát Hà Nội | 25 | (8) |
| 2012–2013 | Dong Nai | | |
| 2014–2015 | Quang Nam | 30 | (10) |
| 2015–2016 | Dong Nai | 14 | (6) |
| 2016 | Bình Duong | | |
| 2016 | Long An | 9 | (5) |
| 2017 | Can Tho | 15 | (3) |
| 2017–2018 | Gokulam Kerala | 7 | (4) |
| 2018–2019 | Mohun Bagan | 19 | (5) |
| 2019–2020 | Gokulam Kerala | 15 | (5) |
| 2020 | URA Kampala | | |
| 2021 | Police FC | 6 | (1) |
| 2021–2022 | Bhawanipore | | |
| 2022 | Mohammedan | | |
| 2022–2023 | Aizawl | 20 | (6) |
| 2024 | Real Kashmir | 13 | (2) |
| 2024–2025 | SC Bengaluru | 15 | (4) |
| 2025 | Samtse | | |
| 2025–2026 | Sundarban Bengal Auto FC | | |

International career
| 2010– | Uganda | 3 | (2) |
- * Club domestic league appearances and goals

Henry Kisekka (born 31 August 1989) is an Ugandan professional footballer who plays as a forward.

== Club career ==
Regarded as an important asset to Dong Nai's attacking line in 2012, he recorded 11 goals, helping his team achieve promotion. Not much later, he received a call up to the Uganda squad ahead of the 2014 FIFA World Cup qualifying rounds.

Binh Duong F.C. canceled Henry Kisekka's contract in 2016.

=== Quang Nam ===
For six rounds, he did not score a goal but by round 9 he had hit 4 goals, making him eighth top scorer of the V.League by that time. This empowered him to score five more, increasing his tally to 9 goals by the end of the season.

Only scoring one goal for Quang Nam in 2015, his profligacy in front of goal forced him to return to Uganda in search for a club. One of his possibilities was Dong Nai F.C. to which he transferred in June 2015.

=== Gokulam Kerala ===
In February 2018, Kisekka joined I-League club Gokulam Kerala as a replacement for Nigerian Odafa Okolie, until the end of the season. On 4 February, he made his debut for the club in a 1–0 away loss, against NEROCA. He scored his first goal in the next match four days later, in the 90th minute and guided his side to victory against Mohun Bagan. He scored a sensational volley after his brilliant touch inside the box gave him time and space for the strike.

On 15 March, Kisekka scored a brace against NorthEast United in the qualifying round of the Super Cup, in a 2–0 win and helped his side enter into the round of 16. On 1 April, he scored again in the next round but in a lost cause as a late goal sealed a dramatic win for Bengaluru and knocked Gokulam Kerala out of the competition.

Kisekka finished the season with seven goals in nine appearances, in all competitions. His brief spell with the Malabarians was a treat to watch for the fans and plaudits alike. He linked well with Mahmood Al-Ajmi and compatriot Musa Mudde to provide goals to an attacking silhouette which looked lethal throughout the season.

=== Mohun Bagan ===
In July 2018, Kisekka switched to fellow league club Mohun Bagan. On 27 October, he made his debut for the club in a 1–1 draw, against former club Gokulam Kerala. He scored on his debut after he headed in the opener of the match.

In March 2019, Kisekka was released from Mohun Bagan after he had a season to forget and the club experienced their worst league season in over a decade.

=== Gokulam Kerala ===
In July 2019, Kisekka signed with his former club Gokulam Kerala after a year in Kolkata with Mohun Bagan. On 8 August, he scored on his first appearance of the season in a thumping 4–0 win against Chennaiyin B in the Durand Cup.

He played a crucial role in forging a formidable partnership with striker Marcus Joseph. Gokulam Kerala went on to clinch the Durand Cup and then followed that up with a semi-final finish at the Sheikh Kamal International Club Cup in Bangladesh, where he scored four goals in equal appearances.

On 30 November, he scored on his first I-League game back for Gokulam Kerala in a 2–1 win against NEROCA. He scored five goals in the league season which was stopped midway due to the COVID-19 pandemic in India.

=== Mohammedan ===
On 6 April 2022, it was announced that I-League club Mohammedan has completed the signing of Kisekka from local Kolkata-based side Bhawanipore. On 30 April, he scored his first goal for the Black Panthers against NEROCA. Under Nikola Stojanović's captaincy, his team for the first time, ran for their maiden national league title in 2021–22 I-League season, but finished as runners-up after a 2–1 defeat to Gokulam Kerala at the end.

=== Aizawl ===
On 21 September, ahead of the 2022–23 I-League season kickoff, Aizawl announced the signing of Kisekka. He made his debut for the club on 15 November against TRAU in an 1–1 draw.

=== Real Kashmir ===
In February 2024, Kisekka joined another I-League club Real Kashmir.

== Career statistics ==
=== Club ===
As of 11 March 2023

| Club | Season | League | | | Cup | | Continental | | Total | |
| Club | Season | Division | Apps | Goals | Apps | Goals | Apps | Goals | Apps | Goals |
|---|---|---|---|---|---|---|---|---|---|---|
| Hòa Phát Hà Nội | 2011 | V.League 1 | 25 | 8 | 0 | 0 | — | | 25 | 8 |
| Dong Nai | 2012 | V. League 2 | ? | 11 | 0 | 0 | — | | ? | 11 |
| Dong Nai | 2013 | V.League 1 | 20 | 7 | 0 | 0 | — | | 20 | 7 |
| Dong Nai | Dong Nai total | | ? | 18 | 0 | 0 | 0 | 0 | ? | 18 |
| Quang Nam | 2014 | V.League 1 | 19 | 9 | 0 | 0 | — | | 19 | 9 |
| Quang Nam | 2015 | V.League 1 | 11 | 1 | 0 | 0 | — | | 11 | 1 |
| Quang Nam | Quang Nam total | | 30 | 10 | 0 | 0 | 0 | 0 | 30 | 10 |
| Dong Nai | 2015 | V.League 1 | 14 | 6 | 0 | 0 | — | | 14 | 6 |
| Binh Duong | 2016 | V.League 1 | 1 | 0 | 0 | 0 | 6 (Note: Appearance(s) in AFC Champions League) | 0 | 7 | 0 |
| Long An | 2016 | V.League 1 | 9 | 5 | 0 | 0 | — | | 9 | 5 |
| Can Tho | 2017 | V.League 1 | 15 | 3 | 0 | 0 | — | | 15 | 3 |
| Gokulam Kerala | 2017–18 | I-League | 7 | 4 | 2 (Note: Appearance(s) in Super Cup) | 3 | — | | 9 | 7 |
| Mohun Bagan | 2018–19 | I-League | 19 | 5 | 0 | 0 | — | | 19 | 5 |
| Gokulam Kerala | 2019–20 | I-League | 15 | 5 | 7 (Note: Appearance(s) in Durand Cup) (Note: Appearance(s) in Sheikh Kamal International Club Cup) | 5 | — | | 22 | 10 |
| Mohammedan | 2021–22 | I-League | 1 | 1 | 0 | 0 | — | | 1 | 1 |
| Aizawl | 2022–23 | I-League | 20 | 6 | 0 | 0 | — | | 20 | 6 |
| Career total | | I-League | 176 | 71 | 9 | 8 | 6 | 0 | 191 | 79 |

=== International ===
As of matches played till 12 December 2010

| National team | Year | Apps | Goals |
|---|---|---|---|
| Uganda | 2010 | 3 | 2 |
| Total | | 3 | 2 |

=== International goals ===
Scores and results list Uganda's goal tally first

| No. | Date | Venue | Cap | Opponent | Score | Result | Competition | Ref. |
|---|---|---|---|---|---|---|---|---|
| 1. | 29 November 2010 | Benjamin Mkapa Stadium, Dar es Salaam, Tanzania | 1 | Ethiopia | 2–1 | 2–1 | 2010 CECAFA Cup | |
| 2. | 12 December 2010 | Benjamin Mkapa Stadium, Dar es Salaam, Tanzania | 3 | Ethiopia | 1–1 | 4–3 | 2010 CECAFA Cup | |

== Honours ==
Mohun Bagan

- Calcutta Football League: 2018–19

Gokulam Kerala

- Durand Cup: 2019

Mohammedan Sporting

- I-League runner-up: 2021–22
