= Arthur Kouassi =

Ivorian footballer (born 1989)

Personal information
- Full name: Koffi Desmos Arthur Kouassi N'nan
- Date of birth: 17 November 1989 (age 36)
- Place of birth: Bondoukou, Ivory Coast
- Position: Forward

Senior career*
Years	Team	Apps	(Gls)
2012	Shenzhen Ruby	67	(30)
2013	Citizen AA	43	(41)
2013–2016	Global FC	199	(107)
2014–2016	Manila Jeepney	44	(10)
2017	Chin United	13	(6)
2017–2018	Ilocos United	20	(11)
2018	Ulaanbaatar City	18	(12)
2018	Gokulam Kerala	2	(0)
2019	Mohammedan	9	(10)
2020	Bhawanipore	3	(0)
2021–2023	Delhi FC		
- * Club domestic league appearances and goals

Arthur Kouassi (born 17 November 1989 in Bondoukou, Ivory Coast) is an Ivorian professional footballer who plays as a striker. He last played for I-League 2 side Delhi.

In 2019, Kouassi came into limelight when he scored five goals in a single match at the Durand Cup with Mohammedan Sporting in Kolkata.

== Career ==
=== Club ===
In 2012, Kouassi signed for Shenzhen Ruby, before moving to Citizen AA for the 2013 season. After leaving Hong-Kong, Kouassi spent three season in the Philippines with Manila Jeepney and Global FC. During Kouassi's time with Global FC, they reached the 2016 UFL Cup final, where they lost 3–1 to Ceres. After leaving Global FC, Kouassi scored six goals in thirteen games for Chin United in the Myanmar National League during the first half of 2017. In the second half of 2017, Kouassi joined Ilocos United, scoring eleven goals in twenty games before leaving in early 2018. On 4 April 2018, Ulaanbaatar City FC announced the signing of Kouassi.

=== International ===
Kouassi has represented Ivory Coast at youth level on five occasions.
