= Vicky Meitei =

Indian footballer (born 1997)

Personal information
- Full name: Vicky Meitei Khaidem
- Date of birth: 27 February 1997 (age 29)
- Place of birth: Manipur, India
- Height: 1.67 m (5 ft 6 in)
- Position: Midfielder

Team information
- Current team: NEROCA
- Number: 9

Youth career
- AIFF Elite Academy

Senior career*
Years	Team	Apps	(Gls)
2015	Southern Samity		
2015–2016	Guwahati	5	(0)
2016–2017	Fateh Hyderabad	15	(0)
2017–2018	Gokulam Kerala	9	(0)
2018–2020	Real Kashmir	6	(0)
2019	→ High Quality United (loan)	2	(0)
2021	TRAU	8	(0)
2021–	NEROCA	17	(1)
- * Club domestic league appearances and goals as of 21:33, 21 December 2022 (UTC)

Vicky Meitei Khaidem (Meitei: Khaidem Vicky Meitei, born 27 February 1997) is an Indian professional footballer who plays as a midfielder for I-League club NEROCA.

== Career ==
Khaidem Vicky Meitei came through the local system before joining the AIFF Elite Academy. He began his senior professional career with Southern Samity of Calcutta Football League.

=== Guwahati F.C. ===
On 2015–16 I-League Vicky joined Guwahati F.C. in I-League 2nd Division.

=== Fateh Hyderabad A.F.C. ===
Ather that Vicky joined on Fateh Hyderabad A.F.C in I-League 2nd Division.

=== Gokulam Kerala FC ===
In January 2017, Vicky joined the new side Gokulam Kerala FC. With Gokulam, he won the 2017–18 Kerala Premier League title.

=== High Quality United ===
In 2019, Meitei moved to Bhutan and signed with Bhutan Super League outfit High Quality United FC on loan from Real Kashmir.

=== TRAU ===
In 2020, Meitei moved back to I-League, signing with TRAU FC. The 2020–21 season became successful as they entered into the title winning fight with Gokulam Kerala and Churchill Brothers but lost their last match and finished on third position.

== Career statistics ==
=== Club ===
As of 21 December 2022

Club	Season	League			Cup		AFC		Total	
Club	Season	Division	Apps	Goals	Apps	Goals	Apps	Goals	Apps	Goals
Fateh Hyderabad	2016–17	I-League 2nd Division	15	0	0	0	–		15	0
Gokulam Kerala	2017–18	I-League	9	0	0	0	–		9	0
Real Kashmir	2018–19	I-League	6	0	1 (Note: Appearance(s) in Super Cup)	0	–		7	0
TRAU	2020–21	I-League	8	0	0	0	–		8	0
NEROCA	2021–22	I-League	15	1	0	0	–		15	1
NEROCA	2022–23	I-League	2	0	2 (Note: Appearance(s) in Durand Cup)	0	–		4	0
NEROCA	NEROCA total		17	1	2	0	0	0	19	1
Career total			55	1	3	0	0	0	58	1

== Honours ==
Gokulam Kerala

- Kerala Premier League: 2017–18

== See also ==
- List of Indian football players in foreign leagues
