= Andre Ettienne =

Trinidadian professional footballer

Personal information
- Date of birth: 9 October 1990 (age 36)
- Place of birth: La Brea, Trinidad and Tobago
- Position: Centre back

Team information
- Current team: Gokulam Kerala
- Number: 4

Senior career*
Years	Team	Apps	(Gls)
2014–2015	Point Fortin Civic	?	(?)
2015–2017	Central	?	(?)
2017	Point Fortin Civic	?	(?)
2017–2018	Honduras Progreso	17	(2)
2019–2020	Gokulam Kerala	27	(0)

International career^{‡}
2016–	Trinidad and Tobago	3	(0)
- * Club domestic league appearances and goals as of 26 January 2020 ‡ National team caps and goals as of 17 March 2019

Andre Ettienne (born 9 October 1990) is a Trinidadian professional footballer who currently plays as a defender for Trinidad and Tobago national football team. He last played for Gokulam Kerala in the I-League.

== Career statistics ==
As of 18 August 2019

Club	Season	League			League Cup		Domestic Cup		Continental		Total	
Club	Season	Division	Apps	Goals	Apps	Goals	Apps	Goals	Apps	Goals	Apps	Goals
Gokulam Kerala	2018–19	I-League	3	0	—	—	0	0	0	0	3	0
Gokulam Kerala	2019–20	I-League	7	0	—	—	4	1	0	0	11	1
Total			10	0	0	0	4	01	0	0	14	1
Career total			10	0	0	0	4	01	0	0	14	1

== Honours ==
Gokulam Kerala

- Durand Cup: 2019
