= Provat Lakra =

Indian footballer

Personal information
- Date of birth: 12 August 1997 (age 29)
- Place of birth: Kalyani, West Bengal
- Height: 1.72 m (5 ft 7 1/2 in)
- Position: Left-back

Team information
- Current team: Churchill Brothers
- Number: 12

Youth career
- United SC

Senior career*
Years	Team	Apps	(Gls)
2017	Southern Samity	5	(0)
2017–2018	→ Gokulam Kerala (loan)	15	(0)
2018–2023	NorthEast United	36	(0)
2023–2024	Jamshedpur	15	(0)
2024–2026	East Bengal	13	(0)
2026	Jamshedpur	0	(0)
2026–	Churchill Brothers	1	(0)
- * Club domestic league appearances and goals as of 5 November 2025

Provat Lakra (born 12 August 1997) is an Indian professional footballer who plays as a defender for Indian Super League club Churchill Brothers. He mainly plays as a left-back, but can also play as a right-back.

== Career ==
=== NorthEast United ===
On 10 May 2018, It was announced that the Indian Super League outfit NorthEast United have signed Lakra on a three-year deal.

In the 2021−22 season, he extended his contract with NorthEast United. By the end of the season Lakra made sixteen appearance for the Highlanders and played an important role in the right back position for NorthEast United. Lakra renewed his contract with NorthEast United for the 2022–23 season.

== Career statistics ==
=== Club ===
As of 9 April 2024

Club	Season	League			Cup		AFC		Total	
Club	Season	Division	Apps	Goals	Apps	Goals	Apps	Goals	Apps	Goals
Southern Samity	2016–17	I-League 2nd Division	5	0	0	0	–		5	0
Gokulam Kerala (loan)	2017–18	I-League	15	0	2 (Note: Appearance(s) in Super Cup)	0	–		17	0
NorthEast United	2018–19	Indian Super League	6	0	–		–		6	0
NorthEast United	2019–20	Indian Super League	3	0	–		–		3	0
NorthEast United	2020–21	Indian Super League	11	0	–		–		11	0
NorthEast United	2021–22	Indian Super League	16	0	–		–		16	0
NorthEast United	2022–23	Indian Super League	0	0	–		–		0	0
NorthEast United	Total		36	0	0	0	0	0	36	0
Jamshedpur	2023–24	Indian Super League	15	0	3	0	–		18	0
East Bengal	2024–25	Indian Super League	5	0	0	0	–		5	0
Career total			76	0	5	0	0	0	81	0

== Honours ==
- Indian Super League: 2025-26
