= Khaled Al Saleh =

Syrian footballer (born 1988)

Personal information
- Full name: Khaled Al Saleh
- Date of birth: 15 January 1988 (age 38)
- Place of birth: Latakia, Syria
- Height: 1.90 m (6 ft 3 in)
- Position: Midfielder

Youth career
- Tishreen

Senior career*
Years	Team	Apps	(Gls)
2007–2009	Tishreen		
2008	→ Kufrsoum (loan)		
2009–2010	Taliya		
2010–2011	Al-Ittihad Aleppo		
2011–2012	Al-Shorta		
2013	Tishreen		
2014	Mabarra	10	(3)
2014–2016	Nabi Chit	42	(6)
2016	Al-Ittihad		
2017–2018	Gokulam Kerala	5	(1)
2018	Shabab Arabi	5	(0)

International career
2005–2006	Syria U20		
- * Club domestic league appearances and goals

Khaled Al Saleh (Arabic: خالد الصالح; born 15 January 1988) is a Syrian former professional footballer who played as a midfielder.

== Club career ==
Following a successful trial, Al Saleh joined Mabarrah in the Lebanese Premier League on 14 January 2014.

== Honours ==
Individual

- Lebanese Premier League top assist provider: 2014–15
