= Charles Teiko Folley =

Ghanaian footballer (born 1991)

Personal information
- Date of birth: 1 November 1991 (age 35)
- Height: 1.90 m (6 ft 3 in)
- Position: Forward

Team information
- Current team: Gokulam Kerala
- Number: 41

Senior career*
Years	Team	Apps	(Gls)
	Fairpoint	19	(6)
2012	Pamir Dushanbe	55	(41)
2012–2013	Ravshan Kulob	18	(15)
2013–2014	Khujand	11	(2)
2014–2016	Ittihad Al-Zarqa	66	(10)
2016–2017	Cihangir	28	(1)
2017–2018	Aswan		
2018	Pütürge Belediyespor	0	(0)
2018	Gönyeli	14	(8)
2019–	Gokulam Kerala	4	(0)
- * Club domestic league appearances and goals as of 14:44, 6 February 2019 (UTC)

Charles Teiko Folley (born 1 November 1991) is a Ghanaian footballer who currently plays as a forward.

== Career statistics ==
=== Club ===
As of 6 February 2019.

Club	Season	League			Cup		Continental		Other		Total	
Club	Season	Division	Apps	Goals	Apps	Goals	Apps	Goals	Apps	Goals	Apps	Goals
Cihangir	2016–17	KTFF Süper Lig	28	1	4 (Note: Appearances in the Kıbrıs Kupası)	0	–		0	0	32	1
Gönyeli	2018–19	KTFF Süper Lig	14	8	0	0	–		0	0	14	8
Gokulam Kerala	2018–19	I-League	3	0	0	0	–		0	0	3	0
Career total			45	8	4	0	0	0	0	0	49	8
