= Jestin George =

Indian footballer (born 1998)

Personal information
- Date of birth: 7 February 1998 (age 28)
- Place of birth: Kottayam, Kerala, India
- Height: 1.87 m (6 ft 2 in)
- Position: Centre back

Team information
- Current team: Thiruvananthapuram Kombans
- Number: 74

Youth career
- –2017: Bengaluru B

Senior career*
Years	Team	Apps	(Gls)
2018–2021	Gokulam Kerala	13	(1)
2021–2023	NorthEast United	5	(0)
2022–2023	→ Real Kashmir (loan)	21	(3)
2023–2024	Bengaluru United	11	(0)
2024	Thrissur Magic	6	(0)
2025	Delhi	7	(0)
2025–2026	Jamshedpur	1	(0)
2026–	Thiruvananthapuram Kombans	2	(0)
- * Club domestic league appearances and goals as of 5 April 2025

Jestin George (born 7 February 1998) is an Indian professional footballer who plays as a defender for Super League Kerala club Thiruvananthapuram Kombans.

== Career ==
After completing his formal education in 2015, Jestin attended trials at Bengaluru FC and got selected in their U-18 team. However, after playing with them for two years, he had to return to his home state as they decided not to retain him any longer. At about the same time, Gokulam Kerala was founded, they signed Jestin to their reserves team immediately.

He got selected to represent Kerala in the 2017-18 Santosh Trophy. Jestin George was part of the team's defence that conceded only three goals throughout the tournament. He also played an important role in the final, assisting Vibin Thomas’ goal in the match that Kerala won on penalties after the score at the end of regulation time read 2-2.

Following his success in the 2017-18 Santosh Trophy, he returned to Gokulam’s reserves team. By then the 2017-18 I-League season was over and the club had appointed Fernando Santiago Varela as their new head coach. Varela’s first assignment was to lead the team to the 2017-18 Kerala Premier League (KPL), and Jestin George was named in the senior squad for the first time.

The 2017-18 KPL also proved to be a success story for both the player and the club, as they topped Group B with seven wins from eight matches. They went on to win the semi-finals against Sports Academy Tirur to reach the finals, where they beat Quartz FC to lift the title. Jestin’s performances in the back did not go unnoticed, as he found himself in the first-team squad more often in the 2018-19 season. He made his I-League debut in a 3-1 defeat against Churchill Brothers on January 10, 2019, as he played only 40 minutes.

=== NorthEast United FC ===
On 16 September 2021, it was announced that Jestin was signed by NorthEast United on a three-year deal. He made his debut for the club on 20 November against Bengaluru FC in a 4–2 loss.

== Career statistics ==
=== Club ===
As of 5 April 2025

Club	Season	League			Cup		Continental		Total	
Club	Season	Division	Apps	Goals	Apps	Goals	Apps	Goals	Apps	Goals
Gokulam Kerala	2018–19	I-League	1	0	0	0	—		1	0
Gokulam Kerala	2019–20	I-League	9	0	4 (Note: Appearance(s) in Durand Cup)	0	1 (Note: Appearance(s) in Sheikh Kamal International Club Cup)	0	14	0
Gokulam Kerala	2020–21	I-League	3	1	3 (Note: Appearance(s) in IFA Shield)	0	—		6	1
Gokulam Kerala	Total		13	1	7	0	1	0	21	1
NorthEast United	2021–22	Indian Super League	5	0	0	0	—		5	0
Real Kashmir (loan)	2022–23	I-League	21	3	1 (Note: Appearance(s) in Super Cup)	0	—		22	3
Bengaluru United	2023–24	I-League 2	11	0	0	0	—		11	0
Delhi	2024–25	I-League	7	0	0	0	—		7	0
Jamshedpur	2025–26	Indian Super League	0	0	0	0	—		0	0
Career total			57	4	8	0	1	0	66	4

== Honours ==
Gokulam Kerala

- Durand Cup: 2019
