= Rajesh S. =

Indian footballer

Rajesh S
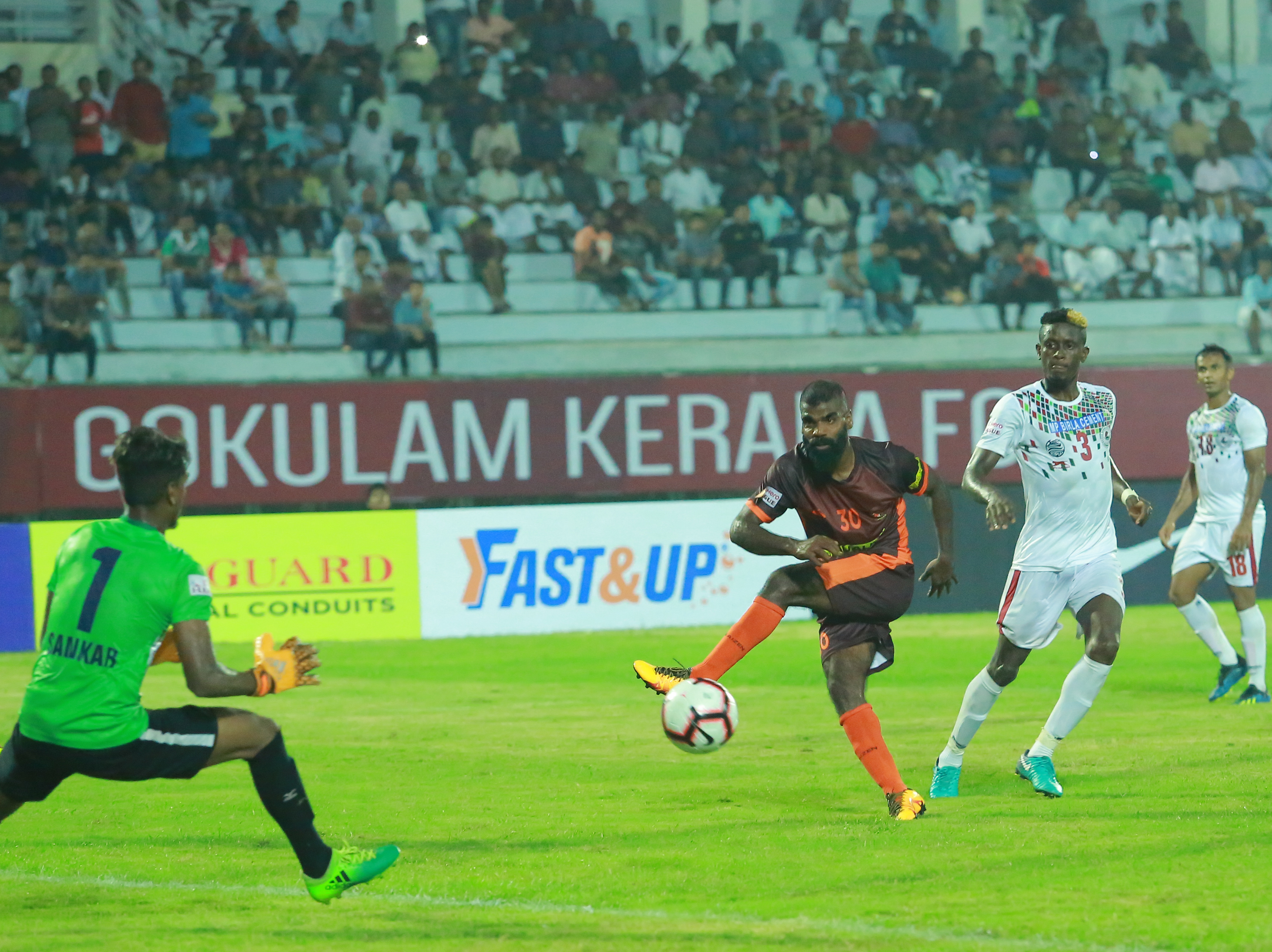

Personal information
- Full name: Rajesh Soosainayagam
- Date of birth: 30 May 1992 (age 34)
- Place of birth: Pozhiyoor, Kerala, India
- Height: 1.79 m (5 ft 10 in)
- Positions: Forward; midfielder

Youth career
- SMRC Pozhiyoor
- United Kerala

Senior career*
Years	Team	Apps	(Gls)
2011-2013	BEML	6	(3)
2016–2017	FC Thrissur Kerala	7	(6)
2017-2018	Viva Chennai	7	(6)
2018-2020	Gokulam Kerala	15	(2)
2020–2021	Chennai City	12	(1)

International career
2018–	Indian Railways	6	(6)
- * Club domestic league appearances and goals as of 12:00, 30 May 2021 (UTC)

Rajesh S is an Indian professional footballer who plays as a striker.

== Early life ==
Rajesh S was born in Pozhiyoor, a fishing hamlet at the southernmost tip of Kerala. His father and three brothers are fishermen. As a child, he was spotted by a local football coach who asked him to join the SMRC Pozhiyoor academy.

== Career ==
=== Early career ===
Rajesh started his career at SMRC and played for SMRC and United Kerala in the Thiruvananthapuram Super Division. He later joined BEML, a club in Bangalore. He has represented Karnataka and Railways in the Santosh Trophy and has scored 28 goals in total in the tournament. He scored 8 goals in 2018 Santosh Trophy for Karnataka and was adjudged as the best footballer in the tournament.

=== Gokulam Kerala ===
Rajesh made his professional debut on 27 October 2018 against Mohun Bagan after coming on as a substitute in the second half. He played a part in his team's equalising goal and later forced a fingertip save from the keeper. He scored his first I-League goal against Shillong Lajong on 11 November, registering a 3-1 win for his club. In the next game he scored the solitary goal in a 1-0 win over defending champions Minerva Punjab.
