= Pritam Singh Ningthoujam =

Indian footballer

Pritam Singh
Personal information
- Full name: Pritam Singh Ningthoujam
- Date of birth: 1 April 1993 (age 33)
- Place of birth: Manipur, India
- Height: 1.65 m (5 ft 5 in)
- Position: Winger

Team information
- Current team: TRAU
- Number: 33

Youth career
- Mohun Bagan Academy
- Eastern Sporting Union (ESU)

Senior career*
Years	Team	Apps	(Gls)
2011–2013	Sporting Goa	0	(0)
2013–2016	Mumbai Tigers	?	(?)
2016	Mohammedan	8	(0)
2016–2018	NEROCA	13	(1)
2018–2019	Gokulam Kerala	15	(1)
2019–2020	Sagolband United		
2020	NEROCA	11	(4)
2020–2021	RoundGlass Punjab	14	(1)
2021–2022	Rajasthan United	17	(3)
2022–2023	Mohammedan	6	(0)
2023–	TRAU	10	(1)
- * Club domestic league appearances and goals as of 21:22, 12 March 2023 (UTC)

Pritam Singh Ningthoujam (Meitei: Ningthoujam Pritam Singh, born 1 April 1993) is an Indian professional footballer who plays as a forward for I-League club TRAU.

== Career ==
=== Sporting Clube de Goa ===
In June 2011, Singh signed for Sporting Clube de Goa who were then in the I-League. He then made his debut for Sporting Goa on 9 November 2011 against Pailan Arrows in the I-League.

=== NEROCA ===
After stints with 2013 I-League second division side Mumbai Tigers and the historic Mohammedan SC, the forward signed for NEROCA in 2016. He also represented Gokulam Kerala in the 2018–19 season but returned to the Manipuri club after a lacklustre stint. Earlier this year on February 8, the 27-year-old created history by becoming the first player to score a hat-trick in the Imphal derby in the I-League. He scored three in the second half in NEROCA's 5–0 win over local rivals TRAU as over 34,000 people were in attendance to witness the feat.

=== Mohammedan ===
In June 2022, Singh joined I-League club Mohammedan. On 16 August, he scored on his debut against Goa in the Durand Cup, which ended in a 3–1 comeback win. On 10 January 2023, Singh's contract was terminated by mutual agreement with immediate effect.

== Career statistics ==
=== Club ===
As of 12 March 2023

Club	Season	League			Cup		Other		AFC		Total	
Club	Season	Division	Apps	Goals	Apps	Goals	Apps	Goals	Apps	Goals	Apps	Goals
Mohammedan	2015–16	I-League 2nd Division	8	0	0	0	–		–		8	0
NEROCA	2016–17	I-League 2nd Division	12	4	0	0	–		–		12	4
NEROCA	2017–18	I-League	13	1	2 (Note: Appearance(s) in Super Cup)	1	–		–		15	2
NEROCA	NEROCA total		25	5	2	1	0	0	0	0	27	6
Gokulam Kerala	2018–19	I-League	15	1	0	0	–		–		12	4
NEROCA	2019–20	I-League	11	4	0	0	–		–		11	4
RoundGlass Punjab	2020–21	I-League	14	1	0	0	–		–		14	1
Rajasthan United	2021–22	I-League	17	3	0	0	–		–		17	3
Mohammedan	2022–23	I-League	6	0	5 (Note: Appearance(s) in Durand Cup)	2	4 (Note: Appearance(s) in Calcutta Football League)	2	–		15	4
TRAU	2022–23	I-League	10	1	0	0	–		–		10	1
Career total			106	15	7	3	4	2	0	0	117	20
