= Fabien Vorbe =

Haitian footballer (born 1990)

Personal information
- Full name: Jean Francis Fabien Vorbe
- Date of birth: January 4, 1990 (age 36)
- Place of birth: Port-au-Prince, Haiti
- Height: 6 ft 0 in (1.83 m)
- Position: Midfielder

College career
Years	Team	Apps	(Gls)
2008–2010	Furman Paladins		

Senior career*
Years	Team	Apps	(Gls)
2005–2008	Violette AC	10	(5)
2011–2012	Tempête	6	(0)
2012	FC Edmonton	9	(5)
2013	IFK Varnamo	6	(2)
2014	Don Bosco FC	15	(3)
2015	Carlos A. Mannucci	8	(5)
2016	Serrato Pacasmayo		
2017–2018	NEROCA	19	(4)
2019	Gokulam Kerala FC	9	(2)

International career^{‡}
- Haiti U17
- Haiti U20
- Haiti U23
2010–	Haiti	16	(2)
- * Club domestic league appearances and goals as of September 28, 2012 ‡ National team caps and goals as of February 28, 2011

Jean Francis Fabien Vorbe (born 4 January 1990) is a Haitian professional footballer who last played for NEROCA F.C. in the I-League.

== Career ==
=== Youth and college ===
Vorbe began his career in 2005 with first division Haitian club Violette AC at age 15, before moving to the United States to play college soccer at Furman University in 2008. In his freshman year, he made 17 appearances and scored four goals including two in his collegiate debut against UNC Wilmington. In his sophomore year, he started 16 games and tallied six goals and one assist. He made 16 appearances again in his junior year and scored four goals.

=== Club career ===
In 2011, Vorbe returned to Haiti to play for Tempête. After one season, he left Haiti to join FC Edmonton in the NASL. He was released after one season and went to play in for IFK Värnamo in Sweden.

=== NEROCA F.C. ===
Fabien Vorbe signed for NEROCA F.C.in 2017-18 and after 18 games in which Fabien Vorbe played in 14 of them NEROCA F.C Runner up the I-League championship.

=== Gokulam Kerala ===
Fabian signed for Gokulam Kerala for 2018–19 I-League season.

== International career ==
Vorbe led his team to the 2007 FIFA U-17 World Cup in Korea, their first time doing so. During Group A qualifying, Vorbe scored important go-ahead goals for Haiti, notably against Honduras and incidentally was named the top scorer of the qualification rounds.

Vorbe made his senior debut for Haiti in a 3–1 against Saint Vincent and the Grenadines in a Caribbean Championship match on November 4, 2010.

== Personal life ==
Jean Francis Fabien Vorbe hails from one of the most notable footballing families in Haitian history, previously producing such stars as Charles, Sébastien and Philippe Vorbe.

== Honours ==
NEROCA

- I-League runner-up: 2017–18

Tempête FC

- Ligue Haïtienne: 2011

Regional

- CFU Youth Cup (U-16) runner-up: 2006
