= Lelo Mbele =

Congolese footballer (born 1987)

Personal information
- Full name: Blaise Lelo Mbele
- Date of birth: 10 August 1987 (age 39)
- Place of birth: Kalemie, Zaire
- Height: 1.74 m (5 ft 9 in)
- Position: Striker

Senior career*
Years	Team	Apps	(Gls)
2003–2004	AS Vita Club	32	(19)
2004–2005	Zulu Royals	29	(7)
2005–2007	Orlando Pirates	31	(7)
2007	CS Sfaxien		
2007–2008	Al-Hilal	7	(2)
2008–2009	Espérance	1	(0)
2009–2010	Al-Hilal Omdurman		
2010–2011	Al-Nasr Benghazi		
2011	Al-Nasr		
2011	Şanlıurfaspor		
2011–2012	Selangor FA	0	(0)
2012–2014	MC Alger	5	(0)
2012–2013	→ CA Batna (loan)	4	(0)
2014–2015	Petro Atlético	4	(0)
2015–2016	DC Motema Pembe	15	(8)
2016–2017	Baf Ülkü Yurdu	15	(2)
2017	Gokulam Kerala	3	(0)
2018	Al-Ahli		

International career
2004–2013	DR Congo	13	(1)
- * Club domestic league appearances and goals

Blaise Lelo Mbele (born 10 August 1987) is a Congolese former professional footballer who played as a striker. Lelo played for different professional clubs such as South African club Orlando Pirates and Saudi Arabian club Al-Hilal FC.

== Club career ==
Mbele helped CS Sfaxien win the CAF Confederation Cup.

On 29 November 2007, Mbele signed with Al Hilal of Saudi Arabia for a fee of $25000 per month to the player and $1.2M to his former club.

He made his Saudi Premier League debut for Al Hilal in a 1–0 away win over Al Watani on 5 December 2007. His first goal for Al Hilal came in a 2–0 victory against Al Ittifaq on 10 December 2007.

In 2008, he joined Tunisian side Espérance.

In January 2009, Mbele signed with Sudanese club Al-Hilal for $1 million deal on a three-year contract. The player's agent cited the financial strength and success of the Al-Hilal to be the favoring deciding factors that made Mbele choose the Sudanese club. He did not have a good season with Al Hilal so Al Nasr of Libya choose to buy him.

On 12 July 2011, Mbele signed with Kuwaiti club Al Naser. On 28 July 2011, Al Naser terminated their contract with Mbele after he ruptured a muscle.

After being a free agent for four months, he eventually joined the Malaysian club, Selangor FA in a two-year contract alongside Lebanese international, Ramez Dayoub. However, due to his injury, Lelo did not manage to play for any games with Selangor and later was released by the Football Association of Selangor.

On 13 August 2012, Mbele signed for Algerian club MC Alger for a two-year contract.

Bahrain became his fifteenth footballing country when he joined Al-Ahli Club.

In 2017, Mbele moved to India after signing with newly formed I-League club Gokulam Kerala.

== International career ==
Mbele was a member of the DR Congo national team at the 2006 African Nations Cup, which progressed to the quarter-finals, where it were eliminated by Egypt, which won the tournament.

Scores and results list DR Congo's goal tally first, score column indicates score after each Mbele goal.

List of international goals scored by Lelo Mbele
No.	Date	Venue	Opponent	Score	Result	Competition	Ref.
1	3 September 2006	Stade des Martyrs, Kinshasa, Democratic Republic of the Congo	Namibia	1–0	3–2	2008 African Cup of Nations qualification	
