= Laldampuia =

Indian footballer

Personal information
- Date of birth: 3 June 1992 (age 34)
- Place of birth: Mizoram, India
- Height: 1.77 m (5 ft 9 1/2 in)
- Position: Midfielder

Team information
- Current team: Aizawl
- Number: 15

Senior career*
Years	Team	Apps	(Gls)
2012–	Aizawl		
- * Club domestic league appearances and goals as of 14 February 2016

Laldampuia (born 3 June 1992) is an Indian professional footballer who plays as a midfielder for Aizawl in the I-League.

== Career ==
Born in Mizoram, Laldampuia was a part of the Aizawl side that won promotion to the I-League in 2015. He scored a brace against Chanmari in the I-League 2nd Division in the match that secured promotion for Aizawl. Overall, Laldampuia scored five goals during the 2nd Division campaign and earned a new contract with Aizawl.

On 13 February 2016, Laldampuia made his professional debut for Aizawl against Shillong Lajong in the I-League. He came on as a 70th-minute substitute as Aizawl drew the match 0–0.

He now plays as a midfielder for Gokulam Kerala FC in the I-League.

== Career statistics ==
As of 14 February 2016

Club	Season	League			League Cup		Domestic Cup		Continental		Total	
Club	Season	Division	Apps	Goals	Apps	Goals	Apps	Goals	Apps	Goals	Apps	Goals
Aizawl	2015–16	I-League	1	0	—	—	0	0	—	—	1	0
Career total			1	0	0	0	0	0	0	0	1	0
