= Francis Ambané =

Cameroonian footballer

Personal information
- Full name: Francis Idriss Ambane Moubourou
- Date of birth: 8 November 1984 (age 42)
- Place of birth: Douala, Cameroon
- Height: 1.82 m (6 ft 0 in)
- Position: Midfielder

Senior career*
Years	Team	Apps	(Gls)
2002–2003	Canon Yaoundé	14	(7)
2003–2004	KSC Lokeren	17	(6)
2004–2007	Union Douala	20	(4)
2007–2008	Canon Yaoundé	19	(5)
2008–2011	ES Sétif	16	(5)
2011–2012	ASO Chlef	17	(6)
2012–2013	WA Tlemcen	21	(7)
2015–2017	AS Fortuna		
2017–2018	Gokulam Kerala FC	3	(0)

International career
	Cameroon U-23	7	(2)
	Cameroon	4	(0)
- * Club domestic league appearances and goals as of 00:00, 31 May 2012 (UTC)

Francis Idriss Ambane Moubourou (born 8 November 1984 in Douala) is a Cameroonian professional footballer, who last played for Gokulam Kerala FC in the I-League.

== Career ==
Ambane started his professional club career with Elite One outfit Canon Yaoundé, where he appeared in 14 league matches and scored 7 goals. He was in Yaoundé's 2002 Super Coupe Roger Milla Runners-up squad.

He later moved to KSC Lokeren a Belgian association football club in 2003–2004 season. After just one season Ambane returned to Cameroon and joined another MTN Elite one club Union Douala. He spent 3 seasons there before he returned to his youth club Canon Yaoundé. In 2009–2010 Ambane Francis was sold to ES Sétif.

On 14 July 2011 Ambane signed a two-year contract with ASO Chlef, joining them on a free transfer from ES Sétif after terminating his contract with the club. On 19 January 2012 Ambane signed a one-year contract with WA Tlemcen, joining them on a free transfer from ASO Chlef

With ES Sétif, he won the 2009–10 Algerian Cup. He was also in Sétif's Algerian Ligue Professionnelle 1 and 2009 CAF Confederation Cup Runners-up squad.

On 11 October 2017, newly-formed I-League side Gokulam Kerala FC announced that they have secured services of Ambane for the 2017–18 I-League season. Gokulam finished 7th in the season and Ambané has appeared in only 4 league matches for "the Malabarians". On 14 January, he was released by the club.

== International career ==
Ambané has represented Cameroon U23 in 7 matches, scoring 2 goals. He featured with the Cameroon 2004 Olympic team in Athens.

Ambane was the only home base that was selected 3 times for the Cameroon national team games in 2006–2007. He made his senior international debut on 23 December 2012 against Niger in a 1-0 friendly win.

He has also represented Cameroon in the 2016 African Nations Championship, where they lost 3–0 to Ivory Coast in the Quarter-finals.

== Honours ==
=== Club ===
Canon Yaoundé

- Super Coupe Roger Milla

(silver) Runners-up (1): 2002
ES Sétif

- Algerian Ligue Professionnelle 1

(silver) Runners-up (1): 2009–10

- Algerian Cup

(gold) Champions (1): 2009–10

- CAF Confederation Cup

(silver) Runners-up (1): 2009
