= Priyant Singh =

Indian footballer

Personal information
- Full name: Priyant Kumar Singh
- Date of birth: 16 January 1991 (age 35)
- Place of birth: India
- Position: Goalkeeper

Team information
- Current team: Sudeva Delhi
- Number: 88

Youth career
- East Bengal

Senior career*
Years	Team	Apps	(Gls)
2010–2012	East Bengal	3	(0)
2012	→ Aryan FC (loan)		
2012–2016	Mohammedan	6	(0)
2016–2017	Churchill Brothers	9	(0)
2017–2018	Gokulam Kerala		
2018	Calcutta Customs		
2018–2021	Mohammedan	29+	(0)
2021–2022	BSS Sporting Club	10	(0)
2022–2023	Kidderpore	6	(0)
2023–	Sudeva Delhi	10	(0)
- * Club domestic league appearances and goals as of 5 March 2023

Priyant Kumar Singh (born 16 February 1991) is an Indian professional footballer who plays as a goalkeeper for Sudeva Delhi.

== Club career ==
After spending years in East Bengal youth system Priyant Singh moved to the senior team with his impressive performance. Later he went to Mohamedan Sporting, and gained experience before coming back to East Bengal in the year 2012. He has represented East Bengal U-19 NFL also during his stint with junior team. He made his debut in an AFC Cup match against Al Qadsia Kuwait, in which East Bengal lost 2–3.playing for Mankundu Sporting Club (In Chandannagar football league )
