= Mohammad Saukat =

Indian footballer

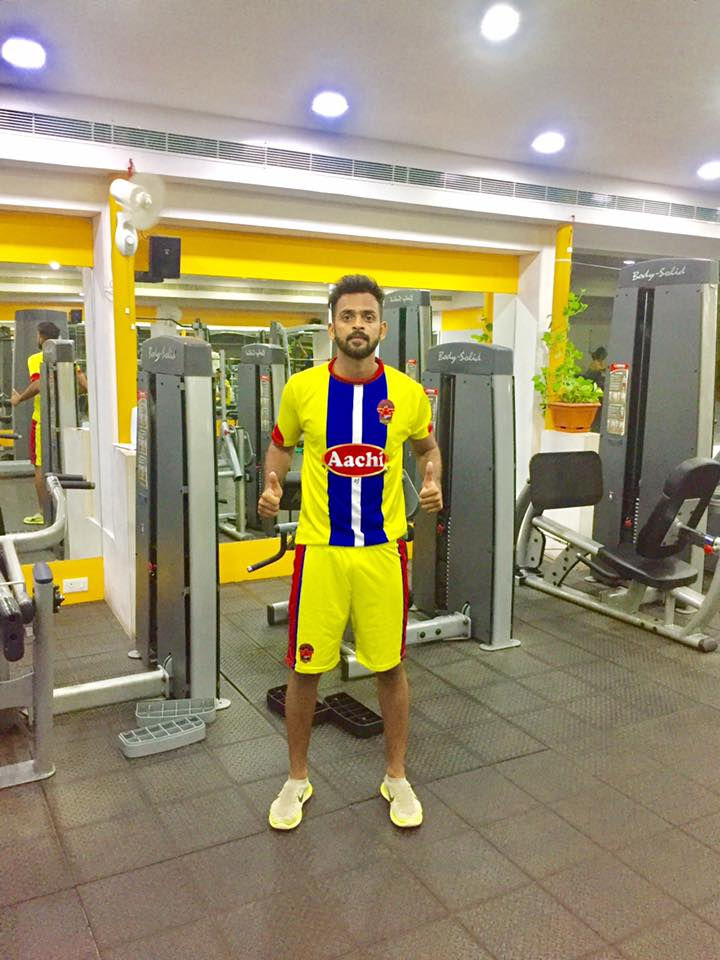
- Saukat with Gokulam Kerala in 2018

Personal information
- Full name: Mohammad Saukat
- Date of birth: 7 November 1997 (age 28)
- Place of birth: Punjab, India
- Height: 1.80 m (5 ft 11 in)
- Positions: Defensive midfielder; central defender

Team information
- Current team: Churchill Brothers

Youth career
- 2012–13: Pune FC
- 2013–14: Mohun Bagan

Senior career*
Years	Team	Apps	(Gls)
2015–16	Fateh Hyderabad A.F.C.	6	(0)
2016	Mohammedan Sporting Club	4	(0)
2017–18	Gokulam Kerala F.C.		
2018	Tollygunge Agragami	9	(0)
2019	BSS Sporting Club	7	(0)
2020	Brigade Boys Club	2	(0)
2021–22	Young Challengers FC	10	(0)
2023	NEROCA		
2024	Thimphu Raven		
2025	Churchill Brothers	1	(0)
- * Club domestic league appearances and goals

Mohammad Saukat (born 7 November 1997) is an Indian professional footballer who plays as a defensive midfielder.

== Club career ==
=== Early years ===
Born in Malerkotla, Punjab, Saukat joined Pune FC Academy as a trainee, his performances in the Junior I-League caught the eyes of Mohun Bagan who made no hesitations in signing him in their youth rank. He was made the Captain of the U-19 Team in the 2013-14 season.

=== Fateh Hyderabad A.F.C. ===
Saukat's first experience of senior football was granted to him by the newly assigned Fateh Hyderabad A.F.C. side in the 2015–16 I-League 2nd Division. Despite the team not making it to the final round, Saukat's performances attracted the recruiters, he was then offered a contract by Mohammedan Sporting Club for the following season.

=== Mohammedan Sporting Club ===
For the 2016, Kolkata League, Saukat was signed as a player by Mohammedan Sporting Club. He played four matches in the League helping the team to be the Runners' Up.

=== Gokulam Kerala F.C. ===
Saukat's first taste in the I-League was provided by the debutant club from Kerala, Gokulam Kerala FC. He just made one appearance in the I-League and was one of the shortlisted players in the ISL Draft, 2017.

=== Tollygunge Agragami FC ===
In July, 2018, Saukat signed for the Sahara Kolkata Premier League club Tollygunge Agragami where he played all their matches in the League.

=== Brigade Boys Club ===
In 2019, he moved to Nepal and signed with Martyr's Memorial A-Division League outfit Brigade Boys Club on a season-long deal.

== See also ==
- List of Indian football players in foreign leagues
