= Daniel Addo (footballer, born 1989) =

Ghanaian footballer

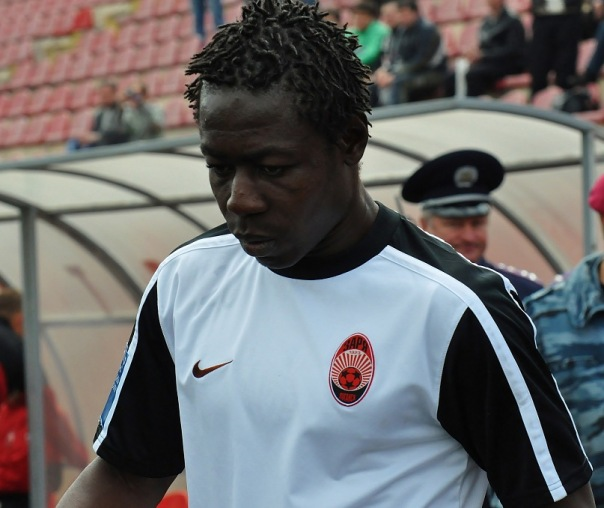

Personal information
- Full name: Daniel Ashley Addo
- Date of birth: 3 September 1989 (age 37)
- Place of birth: Cape Coast, Central Region, Ghana
- Height: 1.82 m (6 ft 0 in)
- Position: Defender

Team information
- Current team: BSS Sporting Club
- Number: 5

Senior career*
Years	Team	Apps	(Gls)
2005–2007	Venomous Vipers	71	(19)
2007–2008	Sekondi Hasaacas	9	(1)
2008–2010	King Faisal Babes	44	(3)
2010–2011	Ashanti Gold	10	(2)
2011–2014	Zorya Luhansk	21	(0)
2013–2014	→ Kairat (loan)	20	(0)
2014–2015	Ermis Aradippou	0	(0)
2016	Ashanti Gold	2	(0)
2016	Gençlik Gücü	28	(1)
2017–2019	Gokulam Kerala F.C.	36	(3)
2019-	BSS Sporting Club	11	(2)

International career
2009	Ghana U20	7	(0)
- * Club domestic league appearances and goals as of 12:48, 14 March 2019 (UTC)

Daniel Ashley Addo (born September 3, 1989) is a Ghanaian football player who plays as a defender for Indian club BSS Sporting Club.

== Career ==
=== Club ===
Addo, who plays as defensive midfielder, began his professional career for Venomous Vipers then later joined Sekondi Hasaacas F.C. and signed after few months on 5 September 2008 for King Faisal Babes. In October 2010, Addo joined Ashanti Gold, joining Ukrainian side FC Zorya Luhansk in 2011. In March 2013 Addo joined Kazakhstan Premier League club Kairat on loan, with a buyout clause, for the season from Zorya Luhansk. In February 2016, Addo signed for Ashanti Gold.

=== International ===
Addo was member of the Ghana national under-20 football team who won the 2009 FIFA U-20 World Cup in Egypt, in the final match against Brazil, Addo received the red card.

== Honours ==
=== International ===
Ghana U-20

- FIFA U-20 World Cup Champion: 2009 (winning final against Brazil)
