= Emmanuel Chigozie =

Nigerian footballer (born 1991)

Personal information
- Full name: Emmanuel Ugochucku Chigozie
- Date of birth: 28 August 1991 (age 35)
- Position: Defender

Senior career*
Years	Team	Apps	(Gls)
2016	Aizawl	9	(0)
2017–2018	Gokulam Kerala	15	(1)
2018–2020	Aryan	11	(4)
2020-21	United SC		
- * Club domestic league appearances and goals

Emmanuel Ugochukwu Chigozie (born 28 August 1991) is a Nigerian professional footballer who plays as a defender who last played for Aryan in the Calcutta Football League.

== Career ==
Chigozie started his career with Indian side, Aizawl, before moving to Mizoram Police AC of the Mizoram Premier League. He returned to Aizawl before the 2015–16 season.

Chigozie made his professional debut for Aizawl in the I-League on 9 January 2016 against the reigning champions, Mohun Bagan. He played the full match as Aizawl lost 3–1.

== I-League statistics ==
As of 4 March 2018

Club	Season	League			League Cup		Domestic Cup		International		Total	
Club	Season	Division	Apps	Goals	Apps	Goals	Apps	Goals	Apps	Goals	Apps	Goals
Aizawl	2015–16	I-League	9	0	—	—	0	0	—	—	9	0
Aizawl	Total		9	0	0	0	0	0	0	0	9	0
Gokulam Kerala FC	2017–18	I-League	15	1	—	—	0	0	—	—	15	1
Gokulam Kerala FC	Total		15	1	0	0	0	0	0	0	15	1
Career total			24	1	0	0	0	0	0	0	24	1
