= Rohit Mirza =

Indian footballer

Personal information
- Date of birth: 15 August 1991 (age 35)
- Place of birth: Mumbai, India
- Height: 1.76 m (5 ft 9 1/2 in)
- Position: Midfielder

Team information
- Current team: Gokulam Kerala FC
- Number: 46

Youth career
- Mumbai

Senior career*
Years	Team	Apps	(Gls)
2013–2016	Mumbai	21	(1)
2016–2017	Kenkre	9	(2)
2017	Mohun Bagan	0	(0)
2017–19	Gokulam Kerala FC	7	(0)
2019-20	Chennai City FC	5	(0)
- * Club domestic league appearances and goals as of 22 May 2022

Rohit Mirza (born 15 August 1991) is an Indian professional footballer who plays as a midfielder for Gokulam Kerala FC in the I-League.

== Education ==
Rohit Mirza has a degree(B.E) in Electronics Engineering. He completed his Engineering from Fr.Conceicao Rodrigues College of Engineering, Bandra in 2013.

== Career ==
Mirza joined Mumbai F.C. as a youth player who played for the under-20 squad in the I-League U20. Mirza then made his debut for the senior Mumbai side on 11 May 2013 in the club's final match of the season against Sporting Goa at the Tilak Maidan Stadium in Goa. He started and played 57 minutes, winning a penalty for his team before being subbed off for Jayesh Rane as Mumbai drew the match 2–2. Mirza was a part of ISL team 'Mumbai City FC' in ISL's Debut season 2014 Indian Super League, where he had 2 appearances for the team. The following Year he was an integral part of Mumbai FC and helped the team survive relegation in key matches at the end of the season.

Mirza then went on to play for Kenkre F.C in the I-League 2 playoffs and scored 3 goals and made 2 assists in 9 matches.

Following which he was a part of Mohun Bagan in the 2017–18 season and was loaned to Gokulam Kerala FC where he played a key role in the team's debut season till he faced a career threatening injury against East Bengal, cut his season short. He made a comeback with Gokulam Kerala FC in 10 months against Indian Arrows.

The next season he played for I-League Champions Chennai City FC in the I-League and AFC Cup.

== Career statistics ==
As of 22 May 2022

Club	Season	League			Federation Cup		Durand Cup		AFC		Total	
Club	Season	Division	Apps	Goals	Apps	Goals	Apps	Goals	Apps	Goals	Apps	Goals
Mumbai FC	2012–13	I-League	1	0	0	0	0	0	—	—	1	0
Mumbai FC	2013-14	I-League	9	0	1	0	0	0	--	--	10	0
Mumbai FC	2014-15	I-League	1	0	1	0	0	0	–	–	2	0
Mumbai City FC	2014	Indian Super League	2	0	0	0	0	0	–	–	2	0
Mumbai FC	2015-16	I-League	6	0	2	0	0	0	–	–	8	1
Kenkre FC	2016-17	I-League 2nd Division	9	2	0	0	0	0	–	–	9	2
Gokulam Kerala	2017-18	I-League	6	0	0	0	0	0	–	–	6	0
Gokulam Kerala	2018-19	I-League	2	0	0	0	0	0	–	–	2	0
Chennai City FC	2019-20	I-League	4	0	1	0	0	0	1	0	5	0
Career total			39	2	4	0	0	0	0	0	43	3
