= Mohammed Irshad =

Indian footballer (born 1994)

Personal information
- Full name: Thaivalappil Mohammed Irshad
- Date of birth: 26 December 1994 (age 31)
- Place of birth: Tirur, Kerala, India
- Height: 1.76 m (5 ft 9 1/2 in)
- Positions: Defensive midfielder; centre-back

Team information
- Current team: Malappuram

Youth career
- Viva Kerala
- Tirur Sports Academy
- 2013–2016: DSK Shivajians

Senior career*
Years	Team	Apps	(Gls)
2016	DSK Shivajians	2	(0)
2017–2018	Gokulam Kerala	15	(0)
2018	Minerva Punjab	0	(0)
2019–2020	Gokulam Kerala	20	(0)
2020–2021	East Bengal	4	(0)
2021	RoundGlass Punjab	7	(0)
2021–2023	NorthEast United	25	(2)
2023–2025	Mohammedan		
2025–	Malappuram		
- * Club domestic league appearances and goals as of 19:22, 24 February 2023 (UTC)

Thaivalappil Mohammed Irshad (born 26 December 1994) is an Indian professional footballer who plays as a centre back for the Super League Kerala club Malappuram.

== Career ==
Born in Tirur, Kerala, Irshad began his career with the Viva Kerala youth teams until the club shut down. He then joined the Tirur Sports Academy in his home town before joining the youth team at I-League 2nd Division side DSK Shivajians in July 2013. In 2015, Irshad was part of the Maharashtra side that participated in the 2015 National Games of India. Playing as a striker, Irshad finished the tournament as the top scorer with 6 goals.

=== DSK Shivajians ===
After his performance during the 2015 National Games of India, Irshad made his professional debut for DSK Shivajians in the I-League on 26 February 2016 against Shillong Lajong. He came on as an 87th-minute substitute for Aser Pierrick Dipanda as DSK Shivajians drew the match 1–1.

=== Services ===
After not finding playing time with DSK Shivajians, Irshad joined Services football side for the 2016–17 Santosh Trophy. He played in the team's first match of the tournament against Meghalaya but couldn't prevent the side from losing 2–0.

=== Gokulam Kerala ===
After playing for Services, Irshad signed for I-League side Gokulam Kerala. He made his competitive debut for the club in their opening match against Shillong Lajong on 27 November 2017. He started the match as a center back as Gokulam Kerala lost 1–0. During the season, Irshad played multiple positions, including midfielder and wing-back.

On 8 September 2018, it was announced that Irshad had left Gokulam Kerala to sign with Minerva Punjab. However, after suffering an injury in pre-season and being unable to find time on the pitch when he returned, Irshad returned to Gokulam Kerala. On 24 August 2019, Irshad was part of the Gokulam Kerala side that won the 2019 Durand Cup final against Mohun Bagan. The side defeated Mohun Bagan 2–1 as Irshad won his first career trophy.

=== NorthEast United ===
On 15 September 2021, NorthEast United announced that they had completed the signing of Mohammad Irshad on a three-year deal. He played as a midfielder for NorthEast United. He scored his first-ever goal in Indian Super League and for the club against Mumbai City on 25 January 2022, coming on as a 73rd-minute substitute for Sehnaj Singh and the match ended 1–1 draw. Irshad scored his second goal for the club against Kerala Blasters on 4 February, which ended in a 1–2 defeat for NorthEast United.

== Career statistics ==
=== Club ===
As of 12 August 2023

Club	Season	League			Cup		AFC		Total	
Club	Season	Division	Apps	Goals	Apps	Goals	Apps	Goals	Apps	Goals
DSK Shivajians	2015–16	I-League	2	0	0	0	—		2	0
Gokulam Kerala	2017–18	I-League	15	0	2 (Note: Appearance(s) in Super Cup)	0	—		17	0
Minerva Punjab	2018–19	I-League	0	0	0	0	—		0	0
Gokulam Kerala	2018–19	I-League	7	0	0	0	—		7	0
Gokulam Kerala	2019–20	I-League	13	0	5 (Note: Appearance(s) in Durand Cup)	0	—		18	0
Gokulam Kerala	Total		20	0	5	0	0	0	25	0
East Bengal	2020–21	Indian Super League	4	0	0	0	—		4	0
RoundGlass Punjab	2020–21	I-League	7	0	0	0	—		7	0
NorthEast United	2021–22	Indian Super League	14	2	0	0	—		14	2
NorthEast United	2022–23	Indian Super League	11	0	4	0	—		15	0
NorthEast United	2023–24	Indian Super League	0	0	1	0	—		1	0
NorthEast United	Total		25	2	5	0	0	0	30	2
Mohammedan	2023–24	I-League	0	0	0	0	—		0	0
Career total			73	2	12	0	0	0	85	2

== Honours ==
Gokulam Kerala

- Durand Cup: 2019
