= Musa Mudde =

Ugandan footballer (born 1990)

Personal information
- Date of birth: 23 May 1990 (age 36)
- Place of birth: Kampala, Uganda
- Height: 1.67 m (5 ft 6 in)
- Position: Defensive midfielder

Senior career*
Years	Team	Apps	(Gls)
	Simba FC	67	(32)
	Sofapaka F.C.	10	(5)
	Simba S.C.	18	(1)
2015	AFC Leopards	19	(2)
2016	Bandari F.C.	19	(6)
2016	AFC Leopards	50	(4)
2017–2018	Gokulam Kerala F.C.	23	(1)
2018–2019	Sports Academy Tirur	5	(0)
2019–2020	Mohammedan	16	(0)

International career
2012–	Uganda	48	(4)
- * Club domestic league appearances and goals

Musa Mudde (born 23 May 1990) is an Ugandan professional footballer who plays as a midfielder.

== Career ==
Musa Mudde made his professional debut in India, playing for Gokulam Kerala in the I-League.

== Career statistics ==
=== Club ===
Statistics accurate as of 22 January 2018

Club	Season	League			Cup			AFC			Total		
Club	Season	Apps	Goals	Assists	Apps	Goals	Assists	Apps	Goals	Assists	Apps	Goals	Assists
Gokulam Kerala	2018–19	19	3	0	0	0	0	—	—	—	0	0	0
Career total		19	3	0	0	0	0	0	0	0	0	0	0

== Honours ==
Gokulam Kerala

- Kerala Premier League: 2017–18
