= Arjun Jayaraj =

Indian footballer

Personal information
- Date of birth: 5 March 1996 (age 30)
- Place of birth: Manjeri, Kerala, India
- Height: 1.75 m (5 ft 9 in)
- Position: Attacking midfielder

Team information
- Current team: Calicut
- Number: 7

Youth career
- Malabar Special Police

Senior career*
Years	Team	Apps	(Gls)
2017–2019	Gokulam Kerala	30	(2)
2019–2020	Kerala Blasters	0	(0)
2020–2022	Kerala United	9	(0)
2022–2024	Gokulam Kerala	7	(0)
2023–2024	→ SC Bengaluru (loan)	14	(0)
2024	Gokulam Kerala	0	(0)
2024-2025	Forca Kochi	8	(0)
2026-	Calicut	2	(1)
- * Club domestic league appearances and goals as of 18 May 2026

Arjun Jayaraj (born 5 March 1996) is an Indian professional footballer who plays as an attacking midfielder for Calicut.

== Career ==
=== Early career ===
Born in Malappuram, Kerala, Arjun is a product of the MSP sports hostel. He played for Calicut University and won the All-India Championship. While playing for his university team against Gokulam Kerala in a friendly, he scored a goal and impressed Gokulam head coach Bino George who signed him.

=== Gokulam Kerala FC ===
==== 2017–18 ====
Arjun played for the club in the Kerala Premier League and scored a goal in the final to help Gokulam win the title. He was included in the I-League squad and made his professional debut for Gokulam Kerala on 22 December 2017 against Indian Arrows. On 27 January 2017 he scored his debut goal, a last minute winner, as Gokulam Kerala won 3–2 over Shillong Lajong.

==== 2018–19 ====
He started in the season's first game against Mohun Bagan and was awarded the Hero of the match. But then it only started once in the following three games. On 30 November 2018, he scored his first goal of the season against Churchill Brothers which finished as a 1–1 draw and was awarded the Hero of the match.

=== Kerala Blasters FC ===
==== 2019-2020 ====
On 29 July 2019, it was announced that Arjun would join Kerala Blasters FC from Gokulam Kerala FC which involves transfer fee of 21 lakhs rupees. However he broke his ligament during the pre-season training and missed the entire 2019–20 season. On 4 December 2020, Kerala Blasters announced that to get sufficient playing time, the club and Arjun Jayaraj have parted ways on mutual consents.

== Career statistics ==
=== Club ===
As of match played 6 December 2024

Club	Season	League			Cup		Continental		Total	
Club	Season	Division	Apps	Goals	Apps	Goals	Apps	Goals	Apps	Goals
Gokulam Kerala FC	2017–18	I-League	15	1	—		—		15	1
Gokulam Kerala FC	2018–19	I-League	15	1	—		—		15	1
Gokulam Kerala FC	Total		30	2	—		—		30	2
Kerala Blasters	2019–20	Indian Super League	—		—		—		0	0
Kerala United	2020–21	I-League 2nd Division	9	0	—		—		9	0
Gokulam Kerala FC	2022–23	I-League	7	0	—		—		7	0
Gokulam Kerala FC	2023–24	I-League	—		1 (Note: Appearance(s) in Durand Cup)	0	—		1	0
Gokulam Kerala FC	Total		7	0	1	0	—		8	0
SC Bengaluru (on loan)	2023-24	I-League 3	6	0	—		—		6	0
SC Bengaluru (on loan)	2023-24	I-League 2	12	0	—		—		12	0
SC Bengaluru (on loan)	Total		18	0	—		—		18	0
Gokulam Kerala FC	2024-25	I-League	—		—		—		—	
Forca Kochi FC	2024	Super League Kerala	—		—		—		—	
Career total			64	2	1	0	0	0	65	2

== Honours ==
Gokulam Kerala

- AWES Cup runner-up

Champions: (gold) 2017
