= Hristijan Denkovski =

Macedonian footballer

Personal information
- Full name: Hristijan Denkovski
- Date of birth: 15 April 1994 (age 32)
- Place of birth: Skopje, Republic of Macedonia
- Height: 1.76 m (5 ft 9 in)
- Positions: Winger; attacking midfielder

Team information
- Current team: Troina

Senior career*
Years	Team	Apps	(Gls)
2011–2013	Rabotnički		
2013	Triglav		
2014–2015	Groningen		
2016	Vardar		
2016	Pelister		
2017	Makedonija		
2017	Azuaga		
2018	Ferriolense		
2018	Gokulam Kerala		
2019	Belasica		
2020	Grbalj		
2020	Nola	3	(0)
2021	Aversa	5	
2021	Brindisi	1	(0)
2022	Troina		
2024	FK Skopje		

International career
2010–2012	Macedonia U-17	13	(3)
2012–2013	Macedonia U-19	12	(4)
2014–2016	Macedonia U-21	4	(0)
- * Club domestic league appearances and goals

Hristijan Denkovski (Macedonian: Христијан Денковски, born 15 April 1994) is a Macedonian football midfielder who played for Italian team Troina.Since 2024 he is a player of FK Skopje

== Club career ==
Hristijan Denkovski was born in Skopje, capital of Republic of Macedonia, today as North Macedonia.

=== Gokulam Kerala ===
In 2018, Denkovski joined Indian side Gokulam Kerala FC and played for the club in the I-League.

== Career statistics ==
As of 25 February 2018

Club	Season	League			League Cup		Domestic Cup		Continental		Total	
Club	Season	Division	Apps	Goals	Apps	Goals	Apps	Goals	Apps	Goals	Apps	Goals
Gokulam Kerala FC	2017–18	I-League	0	0	—	—	1	0	—	—	1	0
Gokulam Kerala FC	Total		0	0	0	0	1	0	0	0	1	0
Career total			0	0	0	0	1	0	0	0	1	0

== Honours ==
Rabotnički

- Macedonian Football Cup runner-up: 2011–12

Groningen

- KNVB Cup: 2014–15

Vardar

- Macedonian First League: 2015–16

Gokulam Kerala

- Kerala Premier League: 2017–18
