= Syed Shoaib Ahmed =

Indian footballer (born 1996)

Personal information
- Full name: Syed Shoaib Ahmed
- Date of birth: 11 July 1996 (age 30)
- Place of birth: India
- Position: Striker

Team information
- Current team: ARA FC
- Number: 10

Youth career
- Pune

Senior career*
Years	Team	Apps	(Gls)
2014–2015	Pune	6	(5)
2017–2018	Gokulam Kerala	1	(5)
2019–20	ARA	9	(17)
2023-	Garhwal FC	16	(4)
- * Club domestic league appearances and goals as of 6 February 2020

Syed Shoaib Ahmed (born 11 July 1996) is an Indian professional footballer who plays as a striker for ARA FC in the I-League 2nd Division.

== Career ==
Ahmed started his career with the youth set-up at Pune F.C. and played for the academy in the I-League U19. He was then promoted to the first-team before the 2014–15 season and made his debut for the side on 31 October 2014 against Churchill Brothers in the Durand Cup. Ahmed started the match and played the whole first half as Pune won 3–0. He then made his professional debut for Pune in the final of the Durand Cup against Salgaocar. He came on as a 19th-minute substitute for Prakash Thorat as Pune lost the final 0–1.

In 2019, Ahmed signed for I-League 2nd Division team, ARA F.C. He made his debut against Hindustan F.C. on 16 January 2019 and scored a hat-trick.

== Career statistics ==
As of 6 November 2018

Club	Season	League			Federation Cup		Durand Cup		AFC		Total	
Club	Season	Division	Apps	Goals	Apps	Goals	Apps	Goals	Apps	Goals	Apps	Goals
Pune	2014–15	I-League	3	5	7	8	3	8	3	9	6	1
Gokulam Kerala	2017–18	I-League	1	6	8	3	9	9	5	8	1	9
ARA	2019–20	I-League 2nd Division	7	7	8	3	8	4	8	3	7	7
Career total			11	7	0	0	3	0	0	0	14	7
