= Mohamed Salah (Indian footballer) =

Indian footballer (born 1994)

Mohammed Salah
Personal information
- Full name: Mohammed Salah K.
- Date of birth: 7 November 1994 (age 32)
- Place of birth: Tirur, Kerala, India
- Height: 1.76 m (5 ft 9 1/2 in)
- Position: Left back

Youth career
- 2009–2012: SAT Tirur

Senior career*
Years	Team	Apps	(Gls)
2012–2014	SAT Tirur		
2014–2015	DSK Shivajians		
2015–2016	SAT Tirur		
2016–2017	Delhi United	6	(0)
2017	SAT Tirur		
2017	Sagolband United		
2017−2018	Gokulam Kerala	9	(0)
2018−2019	SAT Tirur	12	(1)
2019−2021	Gokulam Kerala	2	(0)
2021−2022	Sreenidi Deccan	15	(0)
2022−2024	Punjab	20	(0)
2024−2026	Bengaluru	15	(0)
- * Club domestic league appearances and goals as of 21:30, 11 March 2025 (UTC)

Mohammed Salah K. (born 7 November 1994) is an Indian professional footballer who plays as a defender.

== Career statistics ==
=== Club ===
As of 12 October 2025

Club	Season	League			Cup		AFC		Total	
Club	Season	Division	Apps	Goals	Apps	Goals	Apps	Goals	Apps	Goals
Delhi United	2016–17	I-League 2nd Division	6	0	0	0	—		6	0
Gokulam Kerala	2017–18	I-League	9	0	0	0	—		9	0
Gokulam Kerala	2019–20	I-League	2	0	1 (Note: Appearance(s) in Durand Cup)	0	—		3	0
Gokulam Kerala	Gokulam Kerala total		11	0	1	0	0	0	12	0
Sreenidi Deccan	2021–22	I-League	15	0	0	0	—		15	0
Punjab	2022–23	I-League	7	0	3 (Note: Appearance(s) in Super Cup)	0	—		10	0
Punjab	2023–24	Indian Super League	13	0	3	0	—		16	0
Punjab	Total		20	0	6	0	0	0	26	0
Bengaluru	2024–25	Indian Super League	15	0	2	0	—		17	0
Career total			67	0	9	0	0	0	76	0

== Honours ==
RoundGlass Punjab

- I-League: 2022–23
