= Mahmood Al-Ajmi =

Bahraini footballer (born 1987)

Mahmood Al Ajmi
Personal information
- Full name: Mahmood Merza Mahdi Ahmed Al Ajmi
- Date of birth: 8 May 1987 (age 39)
- Place of birth: Bahrain
- Position: Midfielder

Senior career*
Years	Team	Apps	(Gls)
2006–2009	Al-Shabab	44	(11)
2010–2011	Bahrain Riffa Club	33	(22)
2011–2012	KF Tirana	3	(0)
2012	Manama Club	55	(12)
2012–2013	Hidd SCC	22	(4)
2014	Al-Shabab	29	(1)
2014–2015	Al-Safa	32	(3)
2015–2018	Manama Club	88	(29)
2018	Gokulam Kerala	10	(3)
2019–2020	Al-Safa	26	

International career^{‡}
2007–2013	Bahrain	12	(3)
- * Club domestic league appearances and goals as of 19 November 2018 ‡ National team caps and goals as of 13 January 2018

Mahmood Merza Mahdi Ahmed Al Ajmi (born 8 May 1987) is a Bahraini professional football player who last played for Al-Safa. He also represented the Bahrain national team from 2007 to 2013.

== Club career ==
=== Al-Shabab ===
Al-Ajmi began his professional club career with Al-Shabab Manama in 2006 and appeared in 44 league matches, scoring 11 goals until his move to Bahrain Riffa in 2009.

=== Al-Riffa ===
In 2010, he signed with Al-Riffa and scored 22 goals in 33 league matches till 2011. He was also in Riffa's Bahraini King's Cup winning squad in 2010. With Riffa, he played in the 2010 AFC Cup continental tournament where Riffa emerged as semi-finalist.

=== KF Tirana ===
He was presented to the media on 12 July 2011 along with the other new signings by the club president Refik Halili, where KF Tirana's new kit was unveiled with Al Ajmi chosen to wear the number 10 shirt.

With Tirana between 2011 and 2012, he lifted tournaments like 2010–11 Albanian Cup and 2011 Albanian Supercup.

=== Manama Club ===
After his stint with Tirana in Albania, he returned to Bahraini Premier League with Manama and appeared in 55 league and cup matches, scoring 12 goals.

=== Hidd SCC ===
In the 2012–2013 season, he appeared with Hidd SCC in 22 matches in the Premier League before his second stint with Al-Shabab.

=== Al Safa ===
In 2014, he moved to Saudi Arabia and joined Saudi Second Division side Al Safa FC.

=== Back to Manama ===
Al-Ajmi came back with his previous side Manama Club in 2015. It was his one of the most successful stints in his club career, appearing in 88 league matches and scoring 29 goals. With Manama, he won the prestigious 2016–17 Bahraini King's Cup and 2017 Bahraini Super Cup.

He also represented the club in the 2018 AFC Cup, but Manama didn't qualify for the knockout stages as they lost 5 matches in the Group-B.

=== Gokulam Kerala ===
In 2018, he moved to India and joined I-League side Gokulam Kerala FC. He scored his first goal for the Malabarians, against Mohun Bagan AC on 12 February. He appeared in 10 league matches, scoring 3 goals.

With Gokulam, He has also appeared in the Hero Super Cup in 2018.

== International career ==
Al-Ajmi made his senior international debut on 16 October 2007 against Libya in a 2–0 win match. He scored his first goal for Bahrain against Iran in a 2014 FIFA World Cup Qualification match, which ended as 1-1.

He has also represented Bahrain in tournaments including 2010 WAFF Championship, 2012 Arab Nations Cup alongside 2015 AFC Asian Cup Qualification. He appeared in a total of 12 matches for the Bahrain and scored 3 goals between 2007 and 2013.

== Pepsi Tournament ==
Al Ajmi's exploits include the Channel 4 2006 TV series The Pepsi Max World Challenge. In November 2005, Pepsi and T4 teamed up to find the best 2 amateur footballers in Bahrain, with AlAjmi and Mohamed Ajaj beating thousands of entries. They went on to compete against the best amateur players from 10 other countries. The series was set around the globe with a $100,000 prize for the winning team performing different football challenges involving David Beckham, Ronaldinho, Thierry Henry and Alessandro Nesta. The two Bahraini men's footballers got the highest points throughout the tournament to lose in the final.

== Career statistics ==
=== International goals ===
Scores and results list Bahrain's goal tally first.

No	Date	Venue	Opponent	Score	Result	Competition
1.	11 November 2011	Bahrain National Stadium, Manama, Bahrain	Iran	1–0	1–1	2014 FIFA World Cup qualification
2.	1 February 2013	Bahrain National Stadium, Manama, Bahrain	Singapore	1–0	3–1	Friendly
3.	1 February 2013	Bahrain National Stadium, Manama, Bahrain	Singapore	2–0	3–1	Friendly

== Honours ==
Al-Riffa

- Bahraini King's Cup: 2010

KF Tirana

- Albanian Cup: 2010–11
- Albanian Supercup: 2011

Manama Club

- Bahraini King's Cup: 2016–17
- Bahraini Super Cup: 2017

== See also ==
- Bahrain men's international footballers
