= Northeast Derby (India) =

Association football derby in India

North-East Derby
- The North East
- Location: Northeast India
- Teams: All-time: NEUFC; Aizawl FC; NEROCA FC; TRAU FC; Shillong Lajong FC; KLASA FC; Karbi Anglong Morning Star FC; Bodoland FC; Southern Sporting Union; United Sikkim FC; Gangtok Himalayan SC; Royal Wahingdoh FC; Rangdajied United FC; Langsning SC; Ryntih FC; Chanmari FC; Chhaygaon FC; Sikkim Brotherhood FC; Mawlai SC; FC Raengdai; Nagaland United SC
- First meeting: United Sikkim FC 0-0 Shillong Lajong FC (8 December 2012)
- Stadiums: Rajiv Gandhi Stadium; Khuman Lampak Main Stadium; Jawaharlal Nehru Stadium (most notable)

Statistics
- Total meetings: Total: 36; Competitive: 34
- Most wins: Shillong Lajong FC (10 wins)
- All-time series: Shillong Lajong: 6 NEROCA: 6 Aizawl: 4 TRAU: 3 Royal Wahingdoh: 1 Rangdajied United: 0 United Sikkim: 0 Drawn: 10
- Largest victory: NEROCA 5-0 TRAU (I-League, 8 February 2020); Royal Wahingdoh 0-5 Shillong Lajong (Shillong Premier League, 26 September 2017)

Northeast Derby or North-East Derby is the name given to the football matches played among the northeastern teams, mainly in the national leagues (ISL, IFL, I-League 2, and I-League 3) and cup competitions (Durand Cup and Super Cup).

== History ==
The first match of a northeast derby in I-League was played between Shillong Lajong of Meghalaya and United Sikkim of Sikkim in Paljor Stadium, Gangtok on 8 December 2012 which ended in a goalless draw. United Sikkim got relegated at the end of the season while Shillong Lajong got relegated in 2018-19. Aizawl from Mizoram got promoted in 2015-16 but again got relegated at the end. They were promoted once again in the next season due to some reasons and became the champions. 2017-18 season saw the promotion of another northeastern team NEROCA from Manipur.

=== Shillong Derby ===
From 2013 to 2015 there were consecutive promotions and relegations of Meghalayan teams Rangdajied United (2013-14) and Royal Wahingdoh (2014-15). During this short tenure the two teams played against Shillong Lajong respectively in the Shillong Derby. The first match of the derby in I-League to be played was on 22 November 2013 between Shillong Lajong and Rangdajied United that ended in a 1–1 draw. The next season the derby was played between Shillong Lajong and Royal Wahingdoh, with the first meeting in I-League on 18 January 2015 that ended with Royal Wahingdoh as the winner by 1–2. Both the rivalries continued thereafter in Shillong Premier League for a brief period until the teams were dissolved.

=== Imphal Derby ===
In 2019–20, another Manipuri side, TRAU got promoted, thus the beginning of Imphal Derby. The derby is contested between NEROCA and TRAU, and was first played on 8 January 2020, in which TRAU emerged as the maiden winner of the derby by the scoreline of 2–1. The derby had already begun even before the inclusion of TRAU in I-League, when the two local rivals contested against each other in Manipur State League. The Imphal Derby gained fame in 2022 during the 131st edition of Durand Cup when competitive football returned to the city after COVID-19 pandemic in India. The Government of Manipur declared a half-holiday for all governmental and educational institutions in build-up to the match on 18 August, in which TRAU was defeated by NEROCA 3–1 in the group C opener.

=== Mizo Derby ===
The promotion of Chanmari to IFL in 2025–26 saw them clashing against fellow Mizo side and former champions Aizawl on 24 March 2026. Aizawl won the match 3–2 after overturning a two–goal deficit.

== Teams ==
2026–27 season
Team	City	State	Home stadium	League (tier)
NorthEast United	Guwahati	Assam	Indira Gandhi Athletic Stadium	Indian Super League (I)
Chanmari	Aizawl	Mizoram	Rajiv Gandhi Stadium	Indian Football League (II)
Nagaland United	Chümoukedima	Nagaland	Chümoukedima Football Stadium	Indian Football League (II)
Shillong Lajong	Shillong	Meghalaya	Jawaharlal Nehru Stadium	Indian Football League (II)
Karbi Anglong Morning Star	Diphu	Assam	KASA Stadium	I-League 2 (III)
Raengdai	Noney	Manipur	Khuman Lampak Main Stadium	I-League 2 (III)
Chhaygaon	Chaygaon	Assam	Not assigned	I-League 3 (IV)
Nongkseh SS&CC	Shillong	Meghalaya	Not assigned	I-League 3 (IV)
KLASA	Keinou	Manipur	Not assigned	I-League 3 (IV)
NEROCA	Imphal	Manipur	Not assigned	I-League 3 (IV)
Southern Sporting Union	Imphal	Manipur	Not assigned	I-League 3 (IV)
TRAU	Imphal	Manipur	Not assigned	I-League 3 (IV)

== Statistics ==
=== Current teams ===
Aizawl vs NEROCA

Competition	Aizawl wins	Draw	NEROCA wins
I-League	2	3	2
Other	0	0	1
Total	2	3	3

=== Matches ===
Season	Competition	Date	Home team	Result	Away team
2016–17	Other	3 September 2016	Aizawl	0–1	NEROCA
2017–18	I-League	20 January 2018	Aizawl	1–2	NEROCA
2017–18	I-League	10 February 2018	NEROCA	0–0	Aizawl
2018–19	I-League	7 November 2018	Aizawl	0–0	NEROCA
2018–19	I-League	27 January 2019	NEROCA	0–0	Aizawl
2019–20	I-League	6 December 2019	NEROCA	1–0	Aizawl
2020–21	I-League	30 January 2021	NEROCA	1–2	Aizawl
2020–21	I-League	11 March 2021	NEROCA	0–1	Aizawl

TRAU vs NEROCA (Imphal Derby)

Competition	TRAU wins	Draw	NEROCA wins
I-League	1	1	1
Total	1	1	1

=== Matches ===
Season	Competition	Date	Home team	Result	Away team
2019–20	I-League	8 January 2020	TRAU	2–1	NEROCA
2019–20	I-League	8 February 2020	NEROCA	5–0	TRAU
2020–21	I-League	15 January 2021	NEROCA	1–1	TRAU

TRAU vs Aizawl

Competition	TRAU wins	Draw	AIZAWL wins
I-League	2	0	1
Total	3	0	1

Shillong Lajong vs Aizawl

Competition	Shillong Lajong wins	Draw	Aizawl wins
I-League	5	2	2
Friendlies	0	0	1
Total	5	2	3

Shillong Lajong vs NEROCA

Competition	Shillong Lajong wins	Draw	NEROCA wins
I-League	1	0	3
Total	1	0	3

Shillong Lajong vs NorthEast United

Competition	Shillong Lajong wins	Draw	NorthEast United wins
Super Cup	0	0	1
Durand Cup	0	0	3
Total	0	0	4

Aizawl vs Chanmari

Competition	Aizawl wins	Draw	Chanmari wins
Indian Football League	1	0	0
Total	1	0	0

Shillong Lajong vs Chanmari

Competition	Shillong Lajong wins	Draw	Chanmari wins
Indian Football League	1	0	0
Total	1	0	0

== Former teams ==
Other teams played in the I-League in the past, until they were either dissolved or relegated to regional leagues.

Shillong Lajong vs United Sikkim

Competition	Shillong Lajong wins	Draw	United Sikkim wins
I-League	1	1	0
Total	1	1	0

Shillong Lajong vs Royal Wahingdoh (Shillong Derby)

Competition	Shillong Lajong wins	Draw	Royal Wahingdoh wins
I-League	0	1	1
Federation Cup	1	0	0
Total	1	1	1

Shillong Lajong vs Rangdajied United (Shillong Derby)

Competition	Shillong Lajong wins	Draw	Rangdajied United wins
I-League	0	2	0
Total	0	3	0

Head-to-head ranking (I-League / IFL, 2009-present) US - United Sikkim; RW - Royal Wahingdoh; RU - Rangdajied United; SL - Shillong Lajong; AZ - Aizawl; NR - NEROCA; TR - TRAU; CN - Chanmari

R/S	I-League / IFL season															
R/S	09-10	11-12	12-13	13-14	14-15	15-16	16-17	17-18	18-19	19-20	20-21 (Note: Only the rank in the Championship stage (group A) is taken account of; NEROCA and Aizawl couldn't qualify, hence they played in the Relegation stage (group B). NEROCA eventually got relegated after finishing at the bottom of the group. NEROCA was reinstated by the AIFF.)	21-22 (Note: Only the rank in the Championship stage (group A) is taken account of; TRAU and Aizawl couldn't qualify, hence they played in the Relegation stage (group B).)	22-23	23-24	24-25	24-25 (Note: Only the rank in the Promotion Round is taken account of; Aizawl couldn't qualify, hence they played in Relegation Round.)
1							AZ									
2								NR								SL
3					RW						TR					
4													TR			
5							SL	AZ								CN
6				SL		SL		SL	NR	TR						
7									AZ			NR	AZ			
8														SL	SL	
9					SL					NR						
10		SL								AZ			NR	AZ	AZ	
11			SL						SL							
12														NR		
13				RU										TR		
14	SL		US													

=== Notes ===
- In 2010-11 season, there were no clubs from Northeast India

== Recent meetings ==
=== 2025–26 IFL season ===
Date	Venue	Home team	Result	Away team	Attendance
19 March 2026	Rajiv Gandhi Stadium	Chanmari	1–2	Shillong Lajong	NA
24 March 2026	Rajiv Gandhi Stadium	Aizawl	3–2	Chanmari	NA
18 April 2026	SSA Stadium	Shillong Lajong	6–1	Aizawl	NA
2 May 2026	SSA Stadium	Shillong Lajong	4–0	Chanmari	NA

=== 2026 IFL 2 season ===
Date	Venue	Home team	Result	Away team	Attendance
8 May 2026	Rajiv Gandhi Stadium	NEROCA	2–2	Karbi Anglong Morning Star	NA

== Honours ==
- I-League / Indian Football League:
  - Aizawl (2016–17)
- I-League 2nd Division / Indian Football League 2:
  - Shillong Lajong (2011)
  - United Sikkim (2012)
  - Randajied United (2013)
  - Royal Wahingdoh (2014)
  - Aizawl (2015)
  - NEROCA (2016–17)
  - TRAU (2018–19)
- Durand Cup:
  - NorthEast United (2024, 2025)

== See also ==
- Imphal Derby
- Aizawl Derby
- Kolkata Derby
- Mini Kolkata Derby
- Indian State Leagues
- Super Cup
- List of association football rivalries
- North East Premier League
