= 2019 Shillong Premier League =

10th season of the Shillong Premier League

Shillong Premier League
- Season: 2019
- Dates: 20 August - 30 November
- Champions: Shillong Lajong (4th title)
- Matches: 41
- Goals: 121 (2.95 per match)
- Top goalscorer: Phrangki Buam (10 goals)
- Best goalkeeper: Padam Chettri
- Highest scoring: Langsning 6—2 Nangkiew Irat SC (18 October 2019)
- Longest winning run: Shillong Lajong (5 games)
- Longest unbeaten run: Shillong Lajong (11 games)
- Longest winless run: Laban SC (8 games)
- All statistics correct as of 13 November 2019.

The 2019 Shillong Premier League was the tenth season of the Shillong Premier League, the top-tier football league in Shillong, Meghalaya. Langsning F.C. was the defending champion. The league commenced from 20 August 2019. It was also known as the Officer's Choice Blue Shillong Premier League due to sponsorship reasons.

== Changes from last season ==
- Last season Malki SC has been suspended for a year due to fan violence
- Ryntih FC has been given a direct entry, replacing Shillong United FC

Promoted from SSA First Division

- Laban SC ▲
- Nongrim Hills SC ▲

Relegated to SSA Second Division

- Meghalaya Police SC ▼
- Sawmer SC ▼

== Competition format ==
The 10th season of the SPL has been restructured. The competition consists of 14 rounds that follows a double round-robin format, with each team playing the other twice, for a total of 12 matches. Team which tops the table wins the league, and the bottom two teams gets related.

The position of each team is determined by the highest number of points accumulated during the regular season. If two or more teams are level on points, the following criteria are applied in order until one of the teams can be determined as the higher ranked.

- Highest number of points accumulated in matches between the teams concerned
- Highest goal difference in matches between the teams concerned
- Highest number of goals scored in matches between the teams concerned
- Highest goal difference
- Highest number of goals scored

== Teams ==
7 teams compete in the 10th season of the SPL: 4 from the previous season, 1 through direct entry, and 2 promoted from the 2018 SSA First Division.

- Laban SC
- Langsning
- Nangkiew Irat SC
- Nongrim Hills SC
- Rangdajied United
- Ryntih SC
- Shillong Lajong

== Standings ==
Pos	Team	Pld	W	D	L	GF	GA	GD	Pts	Qualification or relegation
1	Shillong Lajong	12	8	3	1	30	6	+24	27	Champion
2	Rangdajied United	12	5	7	0	25	7	+18	22	
3	Ryntih FC	12	6	2	4	15	12	+3	20	
4	Langsning	12	3	5	4	15	21	−6	14	
5	Nangkiew Irat SC	12	3	3	6	13	21	−8	12	
6	Nongrim Hills SC	12	2	5	5	14	18	−4	11	Relegation to the SSA First Division
7	Laban SC	12	1	3	8	9	36	−27	6	Relegation to the SSA First Division

Updated to match(es) played on 14 November 2019. Source:
Rules for classification: 1) Points; 2) Goal difference; 3) Goals scored;

== Matches ==
20 August 2019	Ryntih FC	1–0	Laban SC	Shillong
				Stadium: Jawaharlal Nehru Stadium (Shillong)

21 August 2019	Rangdajied United	0–0	Nongrim Hills SC	Shillong
		Report		Stadium: Jawaharlal Nehru Stadium (Shillong)

22 August 2019	Shillong Lajong	1–2	Nangkiew Irat SC	Shillong
		Report		Stadium: Jawaharlal Nehru Stadium (Shillong)

24 August 2019	Langsning	1–0	Ryntih FC	Shillong
		Report		Stadium: Jawaharlal Nehru Stadium (Shillong)

27 August 2019	Laban SC	0–5	Rangdajied United	Shillong
		Report		Stadium: Jawaharlal Nehru Stadium (Shillong)

28 August 2019	Nongrim Hills SC	1–3	Shillong Lajong	Shillong
		Report		Stadium: Jawaharlal Nehru Stadium (Shillong)

29 August 2019	Nangkiew Irat SC	0–0	Langsning	Shillong
		Report		Stadium: Jawaharlal Nehru Stadium (Shillong)

2 September 2019	Shillong Lajong	4-0	Laban SC	Shillong
		Report		Stadium: Jawaharlal Nehru Stadium (Shillong)

3 September 2019	Rangdajied United	0–0	Nangkiew Irat SC	Shillong
		Report		Stadium: Jawaharlal Nehru Stadium (Shillong)

4 September 2019	Ryntih FC	1–0	Nongrim Hills SC	Shillong
	Sheen Sohktung 49'	Report		Stadium: Jawaharlal Nehru Stadium (Shillong)

7 September 2019	Langsning	0–2	Shillong Lajong	Shillong
		Report	Kenstar Kharshong 13'; * Freestar Kharbangar 90'	Stadium: Jawaharlal Nehru Stadium (Shillong)

9 September 2019	Laban SC	1–0	Nangkiew Irat SC	Shillong
		Report		Stadium: Jawaharlal Nehru Stadium (Shillong)

10 September 2019	Rynith FC	0–1	Rangdajied United	Shillong
		Report		Stadium: Jawaharlal Nehru Stadium (Shillong)

11 September 2019	Nongrim Hills SC	1–1	Langsning	Shillong
		Report		Stadium: Jawaharlal Nehru Stadium (Shillong)

30 September 2019	Nangkiew Irat SC	2–1	Rynith FC	Shillong
		Report		Stadium: Jawaharlal Nehru Stadium (Shillong)

1 October 2019	Langsning	0-0	Laban SC	Shillong
		Report		Stadium: Jawaharlal Nehru Stadium (Shillong)

2 October 2019	Shillong Lajong	0-0	Rangdajied United	Shillong
		Report		Stadium: Jawaharlal Nehru Stadium (Shillong)

5 October 2019	Nongrim Hills SC	2-1	Nangkiew Irat SC	Shillong
	Batifar Swer 13'; Nikelson Bina 54'	Report	Damehun Syih 18'	Stadium: Jawaharlal Nehru Stadium (Shillong)

7 October 2019	Langsning	2-4	Rangdajied United	Shillong
	Iakmenlang Khongjee 21'; Kynsaibor Lhuid 73'	Report	Oresterwell Langshiang 18'; Donlad Diengdoh 38', 71', 81'	Stadium: Jawaharlal Nehru Stadium (Shillong)

10 October 2019	Laban SC	2-4	Nongrim Hills SC	Shillong
				Stadium: Jawaharlal Nehru Stadium (Shillong)

11 October 2019	Ryntih FC	2-2	Shillong Lajong	Shillong
				Stadium: Jawaharlal Nehru Stadium (Shillong)

12 October 2019	Nangkiew Irat SC	1-5	Rangdajied United	Shillong
				Stadium: Jawaharlal Nehru Stadium (Shillong)

14 October 2019	Langsning	3-3	Laban SC	Shillong
				Stadium: Jawaharlal Nehru Stadium (Shillong)

15 October 2019	Nongrim Hills SC	0-2	Ryntih FC	Shillong
				Stadium: Jawaharlal Nehru Stadium (Shillong)

17 October 2019	Rangdajied United	1-1	Shillong Lajong	Shillong
				Stadium: Jawaharlal Nehru Stadium (Shillong)

18 October 2019	Langsning	6-2	Nangkiew Irat SC	Shillong
				Stadium: Jawaharlal Nehru Stadium (Shillong)

19 October 2019	Nongrim Hills SC	1-1	Laban SC	Shillong
				Stadium: Jawaharlal Nehru Stadium (Shillong)

21 October 2019	Ryntih FC	0-0	Rangdajied United	Shillong
				Stadium: Jawaharlal Nehru Stadium (Shillong)

23 October 2019	Laban SC	0-6	Shillong Lajong	Shillong
				Stadium: Jawaharlal Nehru Stadium (Shillong)

24 October 2019	Langsning	2-1	Nongrim Hills SC	Shillong
				Stadium: Jawaharlal Nehru Stadium (Shillong)

26 October 2019	Ryntih FC	2-1	Nangkiew Irat SC	Shillong
				Stadium: Jawaharlal Nehru Stadium (Shillong)

28 October 2019	Shillong Lajong	1-0	Nongrim Hills SC	Shillong
				Stadium: Jawaharlal Nehru Stadium (Shillong)

29 October 2019	Rangdajied United	6-0	Laban SC	Shillong
				Stadium: Jawaharlal Nehru Stadium (Shillong)

31 October 2019	Ryntih FC	3-0	Langsning	Shillong
				Stadium: Jawaharlal Nehru Stadium (Shillong)

2 November 2019	Nangkiew Irat SC	0-1	Shillong Lajong	Shillong
				Stadium: Jawaharlal Nehru Stadium (Shillong)

4 November 2019	Nongrim Hills SC	3-3	Rangdajied United	Shillong
				Stadium: Jawaharlal Nehru Stadium (Shillong)

5 November 2019	Laban SC	1-3	Ryntih FC	Shillong
				Stadium: Jawaharlal Nehru Stadium (Shillong)

8 November 2019	Shillong Lajong	5-0	Langsning	Shillong
	Phrangki Buam 28', 46', 90+'; 73(o.g)'; Parvaj Bhuiya 79'	Report		Stadium: Jawaharlal Nehru Stadium (Shillong)

9 November 2019	Nangkiew Irat SC	1-1	Nongrim Hills SC	Shillong
	Banshan Nongdhar 57(p)'	Report	Nikelson Bina 16(p)'	Stadium: Jawaharlal Nehru Stadium (Shillong)

12 November 2019	Shillong Lajong	4-0	Ryntih FC	Shillong
	Amon Lepcha 13'; Freestar Kharbangar 38'; Samuel Lyngdoh Kynshi 46'; Mahesh Singh 90(p)'	Report		Stadium: Jawaharlal Nehru Stadium (Shillong)

13 November 2019	Laban SC	1-3	Nangkiew Irat SC	Shillong
	Banshan Nongdhar 43'; Lambor Nongsiej 45+3'; Nongsiej 79'	Report	Bickyson Kharkongor 42'	Stadium: Jawaharlal Nehru Stadium (Shillong)

14 November 2019	Rangdajied United	0-0	Langsning	Shillong
		Report		Stadium: Jawaharlal Nehru Stadium (Shillong)

== End of season awards ==
Award	Team	Prize money
Champions	Shillong Lajong	2,00,000 Lakh rupees
Runners-up	Rangdajied United	1,00,000 Lakh rupees

=== Individual awards ===
Award	Player	Team
Top scorer	Phrangki Buam	Shillong Lajong
Best goalkeeper	Padam Chettri	Rangdajied United
Best defender	Kenstar Kharshong	Shillong Lajong
Best emerging player	Maxderidoff Wahlang	Shillong Lajong
