= 2012 I-League 2nd Division final round =

Tournament details
- Country: India
- Teams: 7

Final positions
- Champions: ONGC
- Runners-up: United Sikkim

The 2012 I-League 2nd Division final round will be the fifth Final Round of the I-League 2nd Division. The tournament began, after the group stage was completed, on 5 March 2012.

== Format ==
The final round of the 2012 I-League 2nd Division will take place between six teams from the group stage and a seventh club, ONGC who were relegated from the 2010-11 I-League season, in a single table format in which each team plays each other twice, once in Siliguri and once in Gangtok. The top two teams at the end of the Final Round were promoted to the 2012–13 I-League replacing the two last place teams in the 2011–12 I-League.

== Qualification ==
The top two clubs from each group, based on final point totals, qualified for the final round. Mohammedan were the first club to qualify for the final round.

=== Group A ===
Team	Pld	W	D	L	GF	GA	GD	Pts	Qualification
Royal Wahingdoh	7	5	2	0	18	7	+11	17	Final Round
Kalighat	7	5	1	1	20	6	+14	16	Final Round
SESA	7	4	2	1	15	9	+6	14	
Techno Aryan	7	2	3	2	13	8	+5	9	
Samaleswari	7	2	2	3	13	14	-1	8	
Kenkre	7	2	1	4	2	16	-14	7	
Gauhati Town Club	7	2	0	5	11	14	-3	6	
Quartz	7	0	1	6	4	29	-25	1	

=== Group B ===
Team	Pld	W	D	L	GF	GA	GD	Pts	Qualification
Mohammedan	7	6	1	0	15	4	+11	19	Final Round
Vasco	7	5	1	1	16	6	+10	16	Final Round
Langsning	7	4	1	2	10	8	+2	13	
KGF Academy	7	3	0	4	15	13	+2	9	
Simla Youngs	7	1	4	2	8	9	-1	7	
Golden Threads	7	2	1	4	12	18	-6	7	
Luangmaul	7	1	2	4	8	17	-9	5	
PIFA	7	0	2	5	5	14	-9	2	

=== Group C ===
Team	Pld	W	D	L	GF	GA	GD	Pts	Qualification
United Sikkim	6	4	1	1	18	11	+7	13	Final Round
Aizawl	6	4	1	1	11	4	+7	13	Final Round
Ar-Hima	6	3	2	1	18	12	+6	11	
Green Valley	6	1	5	0	11	10	1	8	
Southern Samity	6	1	2	3	8	10	-2	5	
Bhawanipore	6	0	3	3	8	11	-3	3	
Eagles	6	1	0	5	4	20	-16	3	

Location of teams in the 2012 I-League 2nd Division

== Final round table ==
Pos	Team	Pld	W	D	L	GF	GA	GD	Pts	Qualification or relegation
1	ONGC	12	6	4	2	20	9	+11	22	Promotion to 2012–13 I-League
2	United Sikkim	12	6	4	2	22	17	+5	22	Promotion to 2012–13 I-League
3	Mohammedan	12	6	3	3	15	11	+4	21	
4	Royal Wahingdoh	12	5	1	6	14	14	0	16	
5	Kalighat	12	4	4	4	18	15	+3	16	
6	Vasco	12	3	4	5	18	23	−5	13	
7	Aizawl	12	1	2	9	13	31	−18	5	

Source: The AIFF
Rules for classification: 1) points; 2) goal difference; 3) number of goals scored.

== Fixtures and results ==
The All India Football Federation released the schedule for the Siliguri and Gangtok phase of the Final Round on 24 February 2012.

=== Siliguri phase ===
==== Match day 1 ====
Monday, 5 March 2012

12:00pm IST (UTC+5:30)	ONGC	5 – 0	Aizawl	Kanchenjunga Stadium
12:00pm IST (UTC+5:30)	Bakar; Gawas; J. Singh (2 goals); P. Singh	Report

3:00pm IST (UTC+5:30)	United Sikkim	3 – 2	Vasco	Kanchenjunga Stadium
3:00pm IST (UTC+5:30)	Bedemi 12', 74'; John 22'	Report	Olivera 48'; Igago 85'

Tuesday, 6 March 2012

12:00pm IST (UTC+5:30)	Mohammedan	1 – 0	Kalighat	Kanchenjunga Stadium
12:00pm IST (UTC+5:30)	Mukhtar 80'	Report

==== Match day 2 ====
Thursday, 8 March 2012

12:00pm IST (UTC+5:30)	Kalighat	3 – 0	Aizawl	Kanchenjunga Stadium
12:00pm IST (UTC+5:30)	Rodrigues 8'; Adenkule 33', 60'	Report

3:00pm IST (UTC+5:30)	Royal Wahingdoh	1 – 1	Vasco	Kanchenjunga Stadium
3:00pm IST (UTC+5:30)	Satiyasen 87'		Dias 5'

Saturday, 10 March 2012

2:30pm IST (UTC+5:30)	Mohammedan	0 – 1	ONGC	Kanchenjunga Stadium
2:30pm IST (UTC+5:30)		Report	Yusa 42'

==== Match day 3 ====
Monday, 12 March 2012

4:00pm IST (UTC+5:30)	United Sikkim	4 – 2	ONGC	Kanchenjunga Stadium
4:00pm IST (UTC+5:30)	Bedemi 2', 12'; Jacobs 58'; Chattri 70'	Report	Yusa 68'; Singh 87'

8:30pm IST (UTC+5:30)	Kalighat	0 – 1	Royal Wahingdoh	Kanchenjunga Stadium
8:30pm IST (UTC+5:30)		Report	Omolaja 45'

Tuesday, 13 March 2012

2:30pm IST (UTC+5:30)	Mohammedan	2 – 0	Vasco	Kanchenjunga Stadium
2:30pm IST (UTC+5:30)	Sil 45'; Okoroigwe 51'	Report

==== Match day 4 ====
Thursday, 15 March 2012

2:30pm IST (UTC+5:30)	Kalighat	2 – 3	United Sikkim	Kanchenjunga Stadium
2:30pm IST (UTC+5:30)	Michael Tayo 20'; Kunal Ghosh 88'	Report	Bedemi 53'; Jacobs 72', 76'

2:30pm IST (UTC+5:30)	Vasco	2 – 1	Aizawl	Kanchenjunga Stadium
2:30pm IST (UTC+5:30)	Akpele 10'; Yadav 45'	Report	Lalbikhula 80'

Friday, 16 March 2012

2:30pm IST (UTC+5:30)	Royal Wahingdoh	0 – 3	ONGC	Kanchenjunga Stadium
2:30pm IST (UTC+5:30)	N/A	Report	N/A

==== Match day 5 ====
Sunday, 18 March 2012

2:30pm IST (UTC+5:30)	Vasco	1 – 1	ONGC	Kanchenjunga Stadium
2:30pm IST (UTC+5:30)	Patil	Report	Oliveira

4:30pm IST (UTC+5:30)	Mohammedan	4 – 3	Aizawl	Kanchenjunga Stadium
4:30pm IST (UTC+5:30)	Okoroigwe 28', 31', 63'; Jaryan 43'	Report	???

Monday, 19 March 2012

3:00pm IST (UTC+5:30)	Royal Wahingdoh	0 – 2	United Sikkim	Kanchenjunga Stadium
3:00pm IST (UTC+5:30)		Report	Jacobs 23'; Bedemi 52'

==== Match day 6 ====
Wednesday, 21 March 2012

3:00pm IST (UTC+5:30)	Kalighat	0 – 0	ONGC	Kanchenjunga Stadium
3:00pm IST (UTC+5:30)		Report

5:00pm IST (UTC+5:30)	Mohammedan	1 – 3	Royal Wahingdoh	Kanchenjunga Stadium
5:00pm IST (UTC+5:30)	Mondal 5'		Saath Satiyasen 27', 90'; Kima 37'

Thursday, 22 March 2012

3:00pm IST (UTC+5:30)	Aizawl	1 – 1	United Sikkim	Kanchenjunga Stadium
3:00pm IST (UTC+5:30)	Lalrinmuana 45'	Report	Bedemi 50'

==== Match day 7 ====
Saturday, 24 March 2012

3:30pm IST (UTC+5:30)	Mohammedan	2 – 0	United Sikkim	Kanchenjunga Stadium
3:30pm IST (UTC+5:30)	Jaryan 60', 90'

2:30pm IST (UTC+5:30)	Kalighat	3 – 3	Vasco	Kanchenjunga Stadium
2:30pm IST (UTC+5:30)	Adenkule 22', 54'; Tayo 83'		Akpele 38'; Colaco 40'; Olivera 45'

Sunday, 25 March 2012

3:30pm IST (UTC+5:30)	Royal Wahingdoh	3 – 0	Aizawl	Kanchenjunga Stadium
3:30pm IST (UTC+5:30)	Singh (2 goals); Kima (1 goal)	Report

=== Gangtok phase ===
==== Match day 8 ====
Thursday, 29 March 2012

3:30pm IST (UTC+5:30)	Kalighat	0 – 1	ONGC	Paljor Stadium
3:30pm IST (UTC+5:30)		Report	Patil 58'

5:30pm IST (UTC+5:30)	Vasco	3 – 2	Mohammedan	Paljor Stadium
5:30pm IST (UTC+5:30)	A. Colaco 52'; J. Colaco 64'; Yadav 90'	Report	Jaryan 45'; Maity 80'

Friday, 30 March 2012

9:00am IST (UTC+5:30)	United Sikkim	0 – 2	Royal Wahingdoh	Paljor Stadium
9:00am IST (UTC+5:30)		Report	O'Nurian 28'; Chencho 78'

==== Match day 9 ====
Sunday, 1 April 2012

3:00pm IST (UTC+5:30)	Aizawl	0 – 2	Royal Wahingdoh	Paljor Stadium
3:00pm IST (UTC+5:30)		Report	Singh (2 goals)

5:00pm IST (UTC+5:30)	Kalighat	0 – 0	Mohammedan	Paljor Stadium
5:00pm IST (UTC+5:30)		Report

Monday, 2 April 2012

2:30pm IST (UTC+5:30)	United Sikkim	0 – 0	Vasco	Paljor Stadium
2:30pm IST (UTC+5:30)		Report

==== Match day 10 ====
Wednesday, 4 April 2012

ONGC	2 – 1	Royal Wahingdoh	Paljor Stadium

Kalighat	2 – 2	United Sikkim	Paljor Stadium

Thursday, 5 April 2012

Aizawl	3 – 2	Vasco	Paljor Stadium
Lalremruata (2 goals); Lalbiakhlua	Report	Fernandes; Colaco

==== Match day 11 ====
Saturday, 7 April 2012

Royal Wahingdoh	0 – 1	Mohammedan	Paljor Stadium

ONGC	3 – 0	Vasco	Paljor Stadium

Sunday, 8 April 2012

Aizawl	2 – 3	Kalighat	Paljor Stadium
Lalremruata 68', 83'	Report	Tayo 5'; Ghosh 62'; Majumdar 82'

==== Match day 12 ====
Tuesday, 10 April 2012

Vasco	2 - 1	Royal Wahingdoh	Paljor Stadium

Aizawl	0 - 1	Mohammedan	Paljor Stadium

Wednesday, 11 April 2012

3:00pm IST	United Sikkim	2 – 1	ONGC	Paljor Stadium
	John 25'; Bedemi 36'	Report	Yusa 67'

==== Match day 13 ====
Friday, 13 April 2012

10:30am IST	Kalighat	2 – 0	Royal Wahingdoh	Paljor Stadium
	Adenkule 24', 51'	Report

12:30 IST	Aizawl	2 – 4	United Sikkim	Paljor Stadium
	Lalrinmuana 49'; Lalremruata 89'	Report	Bedemi 38'; Jacobs 60', 65', 81'

Saturday, 14 April 2012

3:30pm IST	Mohammedan	0 – 0	ONGC	Paljor Stadium

==== Match day 14 ====
Monday, 16 April 2012

Aizawl	1 – 1	ONGC	Paljor Stadium

Kalighat	3 – 2	Vasco	Paljor Stadium

Tuesday, 17 April 2012

United Sikkim	1 – 1	Mohammedan	Paljor Stadium
Bedemi (pen.)		Jaryan	Attendance: 15,000

== Top scorers ==
Note: These stats are only for the Final Round, the Group Stage goals don't carry over to this stage.

Rank	Scorer	Club	Goals
1	(Nigeria) Daniel Bedemi	United Sikkim	11
2	(Namibia) Quinton Jacobs	United Sikkim	8
2	(India) Jackichand Singh	Royal Wahingdoh	8
4	(Nigeria) Wahid Adenkule	Kalighat	6
5	(India) Michael Lalremruata	Aizawl	5
6	(Liberia) Alfred Jaryan	Mohammedan	4
6	(Nigeria) Stanley Okoroigwe	Mohammedan	4
8	(India) Satiyasen Singh	Royal Wahingdoh	3
8	(Nigeria) Michael Tayo	Kalighat	3
8	(Japan) Katsumi Yusa	ONGC	3
8	(India) Angelo Colaco	Vasco	3
