= 2016 Shillong Premier League =

Shillong Premier League
- Season: 2016
- Champions: Shillong Lajong (3rd title)

2016 Shillong Premier League was the 2016 edition of Shillong Premier League, top division football league in the Indian state of Meghalaya. The league began on 18 August with eight teams competing. It concluded with the final on 9 November 2016. The tournament was known as the Geonee Shillong Premier League this season for sponsorship reasons.

Shillong Lajong were the defending champions.

== Teams ==
- Langsning
- Meghalaya Police
- Malki
- Nangkiew Irat
- Nongkrem
- Rangdajied United
- Royal Wahingdoh
- Shillong Lajong

== Table ==
Pos	Team	Pld	W	D	L	GF	GA	GD	Pts	Qualification or relegation
1	Shillong Lajong	14	10	3	1	25	10	+15	33	Champions
2	Rangdajied United	14	9	1	4	23	10	+13	28	
3	Royal Wahingdoh	14	8	3	3	25	10	+15	27	
4	Langsning	14	6	3	5	20	19	+1	21	
5	Meghalaya Police	14	6	0	8	28	19	+9	18	
6	Malki	14	5	2	7	13	15	−2	17	
7	Nangkiew Irat	14	5	2	7	18	21	−3	17	
8	Nongkrem	14	0	0	14	9	59	−50	0	

Updated to match(es) played on 17 October 2016. Source: shillongsa.com The Indian League
Rules for classification: 1) Points; 2) Goal difference; 3) Goals scored;

== Playoffs ==
=== First round ===
31 October 2016	Shillong Lajong	1–2	Rangdajied United	Shillong
	Lalmuanpuia 25'	Report	Nongspung 45'; Moga 84'	Stadium: Jawaharlal Nehru Stadium

1 November 2016	Royal Wahingdoh	2–1	Langsning

=== Semi-final ===
4 November 2016	Shillong Lajong	1–0	Royal Wahingdoh	Shillong
	Tlang 45'	Report		Stadium: Jawaharlal Nehru Stadium

=== Final ===
9 November 2016	Rangdajied United	2–3	Shillong Lajong	Shillong
	Moga 46'; Shangprung 70'	Report	Lalrammuana 22', 71'; Deory 64'	Stadium: Jawaharlal Nehru Stadium
