= Daniel Bedemi =

Nigerian footballer (born 1988)

Personal information
- Full name: Ayeni Bedemi Daniel
- Date of birth: 17 July 1988 (age 38)
- Place of birth: Lagos, Nigeria
- Height: 1.86 m (6 ft 1 in)
- Position: Forward

Youth career
- 2000–2006: City Strikers Kaduna

Senior career*
Years	Team	Apps	(Gls)
2007–2008	Mohammedan	25	(5)
2008	Kolkata Port Trust	18	(4)
2008–2009	Chirag United	13	(7)
2009–2010	Shillong Lajong	23	(6)
2011	Sporting Goa	18	(8)
2011–2012	United Sikkim	12	(8)
2013	Langsning		
2013	Bhawanipore		
2013–2016	Tollygunge Agragami		
2016	Mohun Bagan	2	
2017	Southern Samity	11	(1)
2018	Tollygunge Agragami		
- * Club domestic league appearances and goals as of 3 August 2018

Daniel Bedemi (born 17 July 1988) is a Nigerian professional footballer who plays as a forward.

== Career ==
The forward played previously for Mohammedan, Kolkata Port Trust, Chirag United and Shillong Lajong FC.

=== Calcutta Port Trust ===
He was signed by Port Trust along with striker Raman Vijayan from Mohammedan in 2008. Daniel Bedemi had scored against Railway FC in their 1–0 win. He had also scored in the 1–4 loss against Mohammedan in the 2008 Calcutta Premier Division. He was instrumental as the amateur side finished 5th, ahead of the professional Prayag United S.C.

=== Chirag United ===
Daniel had played for the Kolkata-based Chirag United in the 2008–09 season. In the I-League match against Air India, he had scored the only goal to secure a vital 1–0 win which had saved them from relegation.

=== Shillong Lajong ===
He played for the Shillong-based club in the 2009–10 season. On 18 October 2009 he had scored against Air India in the very 1st minute of the game, they won 3–0. On 8 November 2009, he decisively equalised from the spot kick on the 2nd minute of the stoppage time against Pune F.C. to secure a 1–1 draw. He had scored a late winner on the 89th minute against East Bengal, also getting the Man of the Match award for the performance in the I-League match.

=== United Sikkim ===
During the summer of 2011 it was announced the Daniel signed for United Sikkim F.C. in the I-League 2nd Division. On 9 September 2011, he had scored on the 3rd minute against ONGC F.C. in the Group-B of the Federation Cup match at the Mohun Bagan Ground, his side won 3–2.
He scored on his debut for United Sikkim against Bhawanipore F.C. in the 2012 I-League 2nd Division. He continued his scoring by getting 2 more goals in his second game for United Sikkim against Eagles, where he led his side to a 7–2 win. He again scored in the next match against Green Valley F.C. to help his side to a 3–3 draw, and then in the 3–1 win over Southern Samity. In the Final Round, he scored a brace in the 3–2 win over Vasco S.C., and then again against ONGC. On 15 March 2012 he scored against Kalighat Milan Sangha to equalise, the 2012 I-League 2nd Division match at Siliguri finally ended in their 3–2 win as Quinton Jacobs scored a brace. He again scored against Royal Wahingdoh F.C. (2–0 win), Aizawl F.C. (4–2 win), and then converted the all-important spot kick against Mohammedan to secure the 1–1 draw, and earn promotion to the 2012-13 I-League.

=== Langsning F.C. ===
Daniel then left United Sikkim to join Shillong-based club Langsning F.C. In 2013 I-League 2nd Division, he was one of the leading reasons for his club to top the Group-A. He had scored the match-saving equaliser against Pune-based DSK Shivajians F.C.

He scored a goal in the 3–3 stalemate against Bhawanipore F.C. on 5 April, and then again on 18 April. He scored with a brace against Rangdajied United F.C. to help his side seal a 4–2 win in the derby on 12 April. He had again scored against Rangdajied United F.C. on 22 April, but this time they lost 1–3. On 28 April in the last match, he again scored to hold the Kolkata-based Southern Samity to a 2–2 draw.

=== Bhawanipore F.C. ===
In 2013–14 Indian Federation Cup, he scored a winning goal for Bhawanipore F.C. against United Sikkim F.C., the only win for Bhawanipore F.C. in the tournament.

=== Mohun Bagan A. C. ===
In August 2016, he joined Mohun Bagan and played for mohunbagan in the calcutta Premier League 2016-17. He scored 4 goals in the 6–0 win of bagan against Army Xl. He was released after the CFL season along with Zohib Islam Amiri.

=== Southern Samity ===
In 2017 he joined Southern Samity. He played only two matches for the club in the 2016–17 I-League 2nd Division. He played his first match on 4 February 2017 against NEROCA F.C. . He also featured in Samity's first eleven against Hindustan F.C. on 25 February 2017. He failed to score a goal. Later the club replaced him with odafa okolie for the final round of i-League 2nd division.

== Personal life ==
He is currently divorced from Suprabha Chettri, who works in Hospitality Industry since 2014. They have one son together named Emmanuel. Daniel is not dating anyone at the moment.

== Honours ==
Individual

- Amta Sanghati Gold Cup top scorer: 2015
