= Ryntih FC =

Indian association football club based in Shillong

Ryntih
- Full name: Ryntih Football Club
- Short name: RFC
- Founded: 1998; 28 years ago
- Ground: Jawaharlal Nehru Stadium
- Capacity: 30,000
- Owner: Mawlai Mawdatbaki Fraternity
- Head coach: Wallamkupar Kharpran
- League: Shillong Premier League
- Website: ryntihsc.com
| Home colours | Away colours | Third colours |

Ryntih Football Club (also known as Ryntih Sports Club, previously Ryntih Sports and Culture Club) is an Indian professional football club based in Mawlai Mawdatbaki, Shillong, Meghalaya. Founded in 1998, the club competes in the Shillong Premier League. They have also participated in the 2021 I-League Qualifiers.

== History ==
Ryntih FC was founded in 1998 with the name Ryntih Sports & Culture Club in Mawlai Mawdatbaki, Shillong, in the Indian state of Meghalaya. The Seng Samla Mawlai Mawdatbaki, a non-profitable youth social welfare organization separated the Ryntih Sports Club in 1990, with the motive to encourage and support less fortunate players with the opportunity to compete at a distinguished level. The objective was to emphasize on the promotion of sporting activities.

The Ryntih Sports Club completed its registration to the Registration of Societies under the Society Registration Act in the year 1998.

In June 2020 they submitted bid documents for the direct entry in I-League, but could not enter.

In July 2020 Ryntih SC signed MoU with Bhutanese club Transport United FC.

Meghalaya Football Association recommended Ryntih FC for I-League Second Division.

== Kit manufacturers and shirt sponsors ==
| Period | Kit manufacturer | Shirt sponsor |
|---|---|---|
| 2021—present | T10 Sports | - |

== Stadium ==
Ryntih FC plays their home matches on Jawaharlal Nehru Stadium, Shillong.

== Ownership ==
Ryntih FC is owned by Mawlai Mawdatbaki Fraternity.

== Players ==
=== First-team squad ===
As of 11 October 2021

Note: Flags indicate national team as defined under FIFA eligibility rules; some limited exceptions apply. Players may hold more than one non-FIFA nationality.

| No. | Pos. | Nation | Player |
|---|---|---|---|
| 2 | DF | IND | Dawanplielad Myrchiang |
| 37 | MF | IND | Dameki Khongstia |
| 10 | MF | IND | Andy Zakhary mawthoh |
| 27 | DF | IND | Allen Lyngdoh |
| 77 | DF | IND | Mebankhraw Wahlang |

== Rivalry ==
Ryntih FC has local rivalry with Mawlai S.C. Ryntih FC has state rivalry with Shillong Lajong F.C., Rangdajied United FC and Langsning SC.

== Honours ==
=== Cup ===
- All India Chief Ministers Gold Cup
  - Champions (1): 2020

== Affiliated clubs ==
The following club is currently affiliated with Ryntih FC:

- (Bhutan) Transport United FC (2020–present)

== See also ==
- List of football clubs in Meghalaya
- Northeast Derby (India)
