= Herring Shangpliang =

Indian footballer and coach

Personal information
- Place of birth: Meghalaya, India

Senior career*
Years	Team	Apps	(Gls)
- Meghalaya

Managerial career
- 2009: Shillong Lajong
- 2014: Rangdajied United
- 2018: Langsning FC
- Current: Mawlai SC
- * Club domestic league appearances and goals

Herring Shangpliang is a former Indian football player and the current head coach.

== Coaching career ==
=== Shillong Lajong ===
Born in Meghalaya, Shangpliang started his coaching career at Shillong Lajong. In 2006, Shangpliang almost managed to coach Lajong to the National Football League but lost to Salgaocar. Then, in 2009, it was announced that Shangpliang would be made technical director of the club.

=== Rangdajied United ===
After the sacking of coach Santosh Kashyap, Shangpliang was signed to take over as head coach of Rangdajied United in the I-League. He coached the club for the first time on 1 March 2014, a 3–2 victory over league-leaders Bengaluru FC.

== Statistics ==
=== Managerial statistics ===
As of 17 March 2014.

Team	From	To	Record				
Team	From	To	G	W	D	L	Win %
Rangdajied United	1 March 2014		3	3	0	0	100.00
Total			3	3	0	0	100.00
