= 2015–16 I-League =

9th season of the I-League

I-League
- Season: 2015–16
- Dates: 9 January 2016 – 24 April 2016
- Champions: Bengaluru; 2nd I-League title 2nd Indian title
- AFC Champions League: Bengaluru
- AFC Cup: Mohun Bagan
- Matches: 72
- Goals: 186 (2.58 per match)
- Top goalscorer: Ranti Martins (12 goals)
- Biggest home win: Mohun Bagan 5–0 Bengaluru (23 April 2016)
- Biggest away win: Salgaocar 0–3 Sporting Goa (23 April 2016)
- Highest scoring: Sporting Goa 5–2 Shillong Lajong (10 April 2016)
- Longest winning run: 3 games Bengaluru; East Bengal
- Longest unbeaten run: 11 games Mohun Bagan
- Longest winless run: 10 games Mumbai
- Longest losing run: 4 games Salgaocar
- Highest attendance: 62,342; Mohun Bagan 1–1 East Bengal (23 January 2016)

The 2015–16 I-League was the ninth season of the I-League, the Indian professional football league, since its establishment in 2007. The season commenced on 9 January 2016, after the Indian Super League finished, and concluded on 24 April 2016.

Bengaluru won their second I-League title after winning their first title in 2013–14. The defending champions Mohun Bagan finished second. Aizawl and DSK Shivajians entered the league for the first time in their history, Aizawl through promotion from the I-League 2nd Division and DSK Shivajians through a direct-entry spot.

== Teams and season Details ==
After the 2014–15 I-League season, three-time I-League champions, Dempo, were relegated to the I-League 2nd Division. Mizo club, Aizawl, were promoted from the 2nd Division earlier in May following a 4–2 victory over Chanmari. DSK Shivajians were announced as the direct-entry club for this season on 12 November 2015.

In August 2015, it was first reported that Pune clubs, Pune, and Bharat, the direct-entry side from the previous season, would be withdrawing from the I-League due to the lack of a "long-term vision" for the league. Then, towards the end of October, it was announced that both Pune and Bharat FC had failed to compile to the AFC-licensing criteria needed to participate in the I-League. On 21 November 2015, it was confirmed that Royal Wahingdoh, another debutant club from the previous season, were withdrawing from the league.

=== Stadiums and locations ===
Locations of the 2015–16 I-League teams

Note: Table lists in alphabetical order.

| Team | Stadium | Capacity |
|---|---|---|
| Aizawl | Rajiv Gandhi Stadium | 20,000 |
| Bengaluru | Sree Kanteerava Stadium | 24,000 |
| DSK Shivajians | Balewadi Sports Complex | 22,000 |
| East Bengal | Salt Lake Stadium | 68,000 |
| East Bengal | Kanchenjunga Stadium | 35,000 |
| Mohun Bagan | Salt Lake Stadium | 68,000 |
| Mohun Bagan | Barasat Stadium | 22,000 |
| Mumbai | Cooperage Ground | 5,000 |
| Salgaocar | Tilak Maidan Stadium | 12,000 |
| Shillong Lajong | Jawaharlal Nehru Stadium | 30,000 |
| Sporting Goa | Fatorda Stadium | 19,500 |

=== Personnel and kits ===
| Team | Head coach | Captain | Kit Sponsor | Shirt sponsor |
|---|---|---|---|---|
| Aizawl | (India) Jahar Das | (India) David Lalrinmuana | Vamos | North East Consultancy Services |
| Bengaluru | (England) Ashley Westwood | (India) Sunil Chhetri | Puma | JSW |
| DSK Shivajians | (India) Derrick Pereira | (Cameroon) Aser Pierrick Dipanda | Nivia | DSK Group |
| East Bengal | (England) Trevor Morgan | (India) Gurwinder Singh | Shiv Naresh | Kingfisher |
| Mohun Bagan | (India) Sanjoy Sen | (India) Shilton Paul | Shiv Naresh | None |
| Mumbai | (India) Khalid Jamil | (Japan) Taisuke Matsugae | Nivia | Playwin |
| Salgaocar | (India) Santosh Kashyap | (India) Karanjit Singh | Shiv Naresh | Salgaocar |
| Shillong Lajong | (India) Thangboi Singto | (India) Aibor Khongjee | Adidas | Gionee |
| Sporting Goa | (India) Mateus Costa | (Nigeria) Odafa Onyeka Okolie | None | Models |

=== Managerial changes ===
| Team | Outgoing manager | Manner of departure | Date of vacancy | Position in table | Incoming manager | Date of appointment |
|---|---|---|---|---|---|---|
| East Bengal | (Netherlands) Eelco Schattorie | Mutual consent | 19 June 2015 | Pre-season | (India) Biswajit Bhattacharya | 19 June 2015 |
| Salgaocar | (India) Derrick Pereira | Mutual consent | 26 June 2015 | Pre-season | (Scotland) Malky Thomson | 26 June 2015 |
| Aizawl | (India) Hmingthana Zadeng | Mutual consent | 20 August 2015 | Pre-season | (Spain) Manuel Retamero Fraile | 20 August 2015 |
| DSK Shivajians | New club | | | Pre-season | (India) Derrick Pereira | 20 August 2015 |
| Salgaocar | (Scotland) Malky Thomson | Mutual consent | 29 January 2016 | 9th | (India) Santosh Kashyap | 29 January 2016 |
| Aizawl | (Spain) Manuel Retamero Fraile | Sacked | 7 February 2016 | 7th | (India) Jahar Das | 7 February 2016 |
| East Bengal | (India) Biswajit Bhattacharya | Resigned | 11 April 2016 | 3rd | (England) Trevor Morgan | 13 April 2016 |

=== Foreign players ===
Restricting the number of foreign players strictly to Five per team. A team could use Four foreign players on the field each game.

| Club | Player 1 | Player 2 | Player 3 | Asian Player |
|---|---|---|---|---|
| Aizawl | (Liberia) Alfred Jaryan | (Nigeria) Emmanuel Chigozie | (Nigeria) Joel Sunday | (Japan) Yuta Kinowaki |
| Bengaluru | (England) John Johnson | (Republic of Ireland) Michael Collins | (Kenya) Curtis Osano | (North Korea) Kim Song-Yong |
| DSK Shivajians | (Cameroon) Aser Pierrick Dipanda | (Ivory Coast) Douhou Pierre | (Spain) Juan Quero | (Afghanistan) Zohib Islam Amiri |
| East Bengal | (France) Bernard Mendy | (Nigeria) Ranti Martins | (Nigeria) Bello Razaq | (South Korea) Do Dong-hyun |
| Mohun Bagan | (Brazil) Luciano Sabrosa | (Haiti) Sony Norde | (Trinidad and Tobago) Cornell Glenn | (Japan) Katsumi Yusa |
| Mumbai | (Japan) Ryuki Kozawa | (Liberia) Eric Brown | (North Korea) Son Min-chol | (Japan) Taisuke Matsugae |
| Salgaocar | (Brazil) Éder Monteiro Fernandes | (Scotland) Darryl Duffy | (Scotland) Martin Scott | (Cameroon) Calvin Mbarga |
| Shillong Lajong | (Brazil) Fábio Pena | (Brazil) Uilliams | (Nigeria) Penn Orji | (Japan) Yusuke Yamagata |
| Sporting Goa | (Nigeria) Loveday Enyinnaya | (Nigeria) Odafa Onyeka Okolie | (Trinidad and Tobago) Densil Theobald | (Syria) Mahmoud Amnah |

== League table ==
| Pos | Team | Pld | W | D | L | GF | GA | GD | Pts | Qualification or relegation |
|---|---|---|---|---|---|---|---|---|---|---|
| 1 | Bengaluru (C) | 16 | 10 | 2 | 4 | 24 | 17 | +7 | 32 | Qualification to Champions League qualifying play-off |
| 2 | Mohun Bagan | 16 | 8 | 6 | 2 | 32 | 16 | +16 | 30 | Qualification to AFC Cup qualifying play-off (Note: Mohun Bagan qualified for the 2017 AFC Cup by winning the 2015–16 Federation Cup.) |
| 3 | East Bengal | 16 | 7 | 4 | 5 | 22 | 18 | +4 | 25 | |
| 4 | Sporting Goa | 16 | 5 | 7 | 4 | 24 | 20 | +4 | 22 | Withdrew (Note: Sporting Goa and Salgaocar withdrew from I-League.) |
| 5 | Mumbai | 16 | 4 | 7 | 5 | 20 | 19 | +1 | 19 | |
| 6 | Shillong Lajong | 16 | 4 | 6 | 6 | 14 | 23 | −9 | 18 | |
| 7 | Salgaocar (Note: Salgaocar ahead on head-to-head record with a 1–1 draw and 1–0 win over Aizawl over the two legs.) | 16 | 4 | 4 | 8 | 19 | 27 | −8 | 16 | Withdrew |
| 8 | Aizawl (Note: Aizawl were supposed to be relegated, but reinstated for 2016–17 season.) | 16 | 4 | 4 | 8 | 15 | 21 | −6 | 16 | |
| 9 | DSK Shivajians (Note: DSK Shivajians were given relegation immunity for three years.) | 16 | 3 | 6 | 7 | 16 | 25 | −9 | 15 | |

Source: I-League
Rules for classification: 1) points; 2) head-to-head points; 3) head-to-head goal difference; 4) goal difference; 5) number of goals scored; 6) play-off match
(C) Champions

=== Result table ===
| Home \ Away | AFC | BFC | DSK | KEB | MB | MUM | LAJ | SFC | SCG |
|---|---|---|---|---|---|---|---|---|---|
| Aizawl | — | 0–1 | 2–0 | 2–3 | 2–1 | 2–0 | 0–0 | 0–1 | 0–2 |
| Bengaluru | 1–0 | — | 4–1 | 3–1 | 0–2 | 1–0 | 3–0 | 2–0 | 1–2 |
| DSK Shivajians | 0–1 | 1–1 | — | 2–0 | 0–2 | 1–0 | 1–1 | 2–3 | 3–1 |
| East Bengal | 2–0 | 0–1 | 1–0 | — | 2–1 | 2–2 | 4–0 | 2–1 | 0–0 |
| Mohun Bagan | 3–1 | 5–0 | 3–3 | 1–1 | — | 2–0 | 1–1 | 4–2 | 1–0 |
| Mumbai | 2–2 | 2–0 | 4–0 | 0–0 | 0–0 | — | 2–1 | 2–1 | 2–2 |
| Shillong Lajong | 3–1 | 0–2 | 1–1 | 1–0 | 2–2 | 0–0 | — | 1–0 | 1–0 |
| Salgaocar | 1–1 | 1–2 | 1–1 | 3–1 | 1–3 | 2–2 | 1–0 | — | 0–3 |
| Sporting Goa | 1–1 | 2–2 | 0–0 | 1–3 | 1–1 | 3–2 | 5–2 | 1–1 | — |

Source: Results & Fixtures
Legend: Blue = home team win; Yellow = draw; Red = away team win.

== Season statistics ==
As of 24 April 2016

=== Top scorers ===
| Rank | Player | Team | Goals |
|---|---|---|---|
| 1 | (Nigeria) Ranti Martins | East Bengal | 12 |
| 2 | (Scotland) Darryl Duffy | Salgaocar | 11 |
| 2 | (Trinidad and Tobago) Cornell Glen | Mohun Bagan | 11 |
| 4 | (Cameroon) Aser Pierrick Dipanda | DSK Shivajians | 7 |
| 5 | (Nigeria) Odafa Onyeka Okolie | Sporting Goa | 6 |
| 6 | (Japan) Katsumi Yusa | Mohun Bagan | 5 |
| 6 | (North Korea) Kim Song-Yong | Bengaluru | 5 |
| 6 | (Haiti) Sony Norde | Mohun Bagan | 5 |
| 6 | (India) Sunil Chhetri | Bengaluru | 5 |
| 6 | (India) Sushil Kumar Singh | Mumbai | 5 |

=== Top Indian scorers ===
| Rank | Player | Team | Goals |
|---|---|---|---|
| 1 | (India) Sunil Chhetri | Bengaluru | 5 |
| 1 | (India) Sushil Kumar Singh | Mumbai | 5 |
| 3 | (India) C.K. Vineeth | Bengaluru | 4 |
| 3 | (India) Jeje Lalpekhlua | Mohun Bagan | 4 |
| 5 | (India) Bikash Jairu | East Bengal | 3 |
| 5 | (India) Sumit Passi | Sporting Goa | 3 |
| 7 | (India) Balwant Singh | Mohun Bagan | 2 |
| 7 | (India) Eugeneson Lyngdoh | Bengaluru | 2 |
| 7 | (India) Jackichand Singh | Salgaocar | 2 |
| 7 | (India) Marcus Masceranhas | Sporting Goa | 2 |
| 7 | (India) Nicholas Fernandes | Sporting Goa | 2 |
| 7 | (India) Subhasish Bose | Sporting Goa | 2 |
| 7 | (India) Thongkhosiem Haokip | Salgaocar | 2 |
| 7 | (India) Jayesh Rane | Mumbai | 2 |

=== Hat-tricks ===
| Player | For | Against | Result | Date | Ref |
|---|---|---|---|---|---|
| (Nigeria) Ranti Martins | East Bengal | Shillong Lajong | 4–0 | 9 February 2016 | |
| (Scotland) Darryl Duffy | Salgaocar | DSK Shivajians | 3–2 | 14 February 2016 | |
| (Nigeria) Ranti Martins | East Bengal | Aizawl | 3–2 | 12 March 2016 | |

== Awards ==
=== AIFF Awards ===
All India Football Federation awarded the following awards for the I-League season.

- Best player of I-League: Sony Norde (Mohun Bagan)
- Best goalkeeper of I-League: Amrinder Singh (Bengaluru)
- Best defender of I-League: John Johnson (Bengaluru)
- Best midfielder of I-League: Eugeneson Lyngdoh (Bengaluru)
- Best forward of I-League: Ranti Martins (East Bengal)
- Best coach of I-League: Ashley Westwood (Bengaluru)
- Best organizer of I-League: Bengaluru

== See also ==
- 2015–16 Bengaluru FC season
- 2015–16 East Bengal F.C. season
- 2015–16 Mohun Bagan A.C. season
- 2015–16 I-League 2nd Division
- 2015–16 I-League U18
- 2015–16 I-League Youth U15
