= Loveday Enyinnaya =

Nigerian footballer (born 1989)

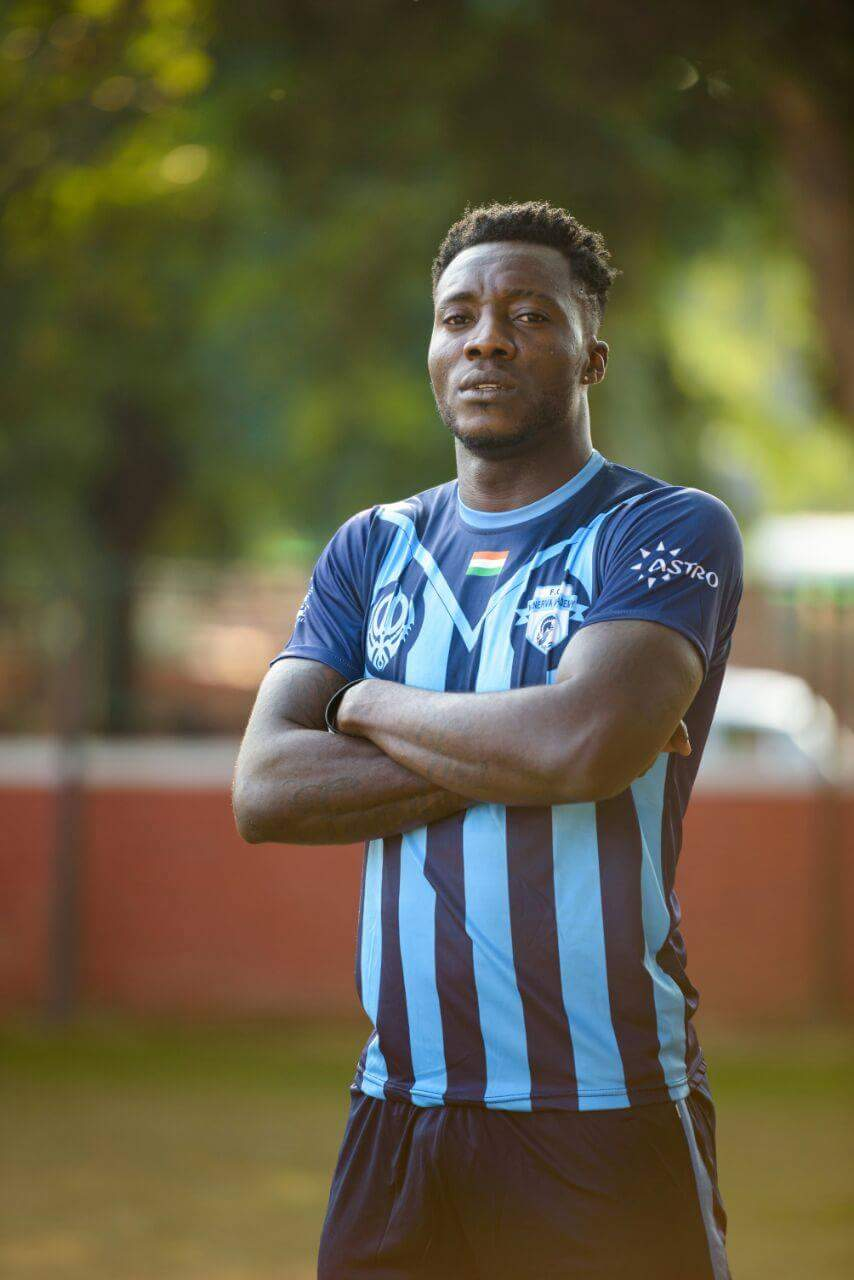
- Enyinnaya with Minerva Punjab FC

Personal information
- Full name: Loveday Enyinnaya Okechukwu
- Date of birth: 28 November 1989 (age 36)
- Place of birth: Nigeria
- Height: 1.91 m (6 ft 3 in)
- Position: Defender

Senior career*
Years	Team	Apps	(Gls)
2010–2011	Malabar United		
2011–2014	Rangdajied United		
2014–2015	Royal Wahingdoh	19	(0)
2015–2016	Sporting Clube De Goa	15	(24)
2017	Minerva Punjab FC	14	(1)
2018–2020	Real Kashmir		
- * Club domestic league appearances and goals

Loveday Enyinnaya Okechukwu (born 28 November 1989) is a Nigerian former professional footballer who played as a defender.

== Career ==
Born in Warri, Nigeria, Enyinnaya started his career with Malabar United of the I-League 2nd Division in 2010. He then went on to join Rangdajied United, then Ar-Hime, in 2011 and participated with the club in the Shillong Premier League and the I-League 2nd Division. He then joined Royal Wahingdoh and played for the side in the 2nd Division in 2014, helping them secure promotion to the I-League.

He made his professional debut for the side on 28 December 2014 in the Federation Cup against Mumbai.

== Honours ==
Rangdajied United

- I-League 2nd Division: 2013
- Shillong Premier League: 2013

Sporting Clube de Goa

- Goa Professional League: 2015–16

Real Kashmir

- I-League 2nd Division: 2017–18
