= Shin Ho-jun =

South Korean footballer (born 1989)

Personal information
- Date of birth: 14 April 1989 (age 37)
- Height: 1.81 m (5 ft 11 in)
- Position: Forward

Youth career
- –2008: Kumho High School
- 2009–2011: Gwangju University

Senior career*
Years	Team	Apps	(Gls)
2012	Cheonan City	1	(0)
2013	Rangdajied United	5	(0)
- * Club domestic league appearances and goals as of 17:04, 6 September 2020 (UTC)

- Shin Ho-jun
- Hangul: 신호준
- RR: Sin Hojun
- MR: Sin Hojun

Shin Ho-jun (Korean: 신호준; born 14 April 1989) is a retired South Korean professional footballer, who last played for Rangdajied United FC in the I-League. He began his career as a striker for Gwangju University and played there until 2009.

== Career statistics ==
=== Club ===
Club	Season	League			Cup		Other		Total	
Club	Season	Division	Apps	Goals	Apps	Goals	Apps	Goals	Apps	Goals
Cheonan City	2012	Challengers League	1	0	0	0	0	0	1	0
Rangdajied United	2013–14	I-League	5	0	0	0	0	0	5	0
Career total			6	0	0	0	0	0	6	0
