= Kenstar Kharshong =

Indian footballer

Personal information
- Full name: Kenstar Kharshong
- Date of birth: 3 May 1999 (age 27)
- Place of birth: Meghalaya, India
- Height: 1.83 m (6 ft 0 in)
- Position: Centre-back

Team information
- Current team: Shillong Lajong
- Number: 26

Youth career
- –2017: Shillong Lajong U18

Senior career*
Years	Team	Apps	(Gls)
2017–2020	Shillong Lajong	30	(0)
2020	→ Kerala Blasters B (loan)	3	(0)
2020–2021	Kerala Blasters	0	(0)
2021–2022	Ryntih	3	(0)
2022–2023	Mumbai Kenkre	12	(0)
2023	Mawlai SC	17	(2)
2023–	Shillong Lajong	28	(2)
- * Club domestic league appearances and goals ‡ National team caps and goals as of 23:11, 5 April 2025 (UTC)

Kenstar Kharshong (born 3 May 1999) is an Indian professional footballer who plays as a defender for I-League club Shillong Lajong.

== Career ==
=== Youth and early career ===
Kharshong is a product of Shillong Lajong Academy and was promoted to their senior team in 2017. He made 19 appearances in total for the club during his debut season in the 2017–18 I-League. In the following 2018-19 season, he made 11 appearances for the club.

=== Kerala Blasters ===
He was loaned to Kerala Blasters in 2019. He made 3 appearances for their reserves side in the I-League 2nd Division.

In 2020, he was offered a contract into the senior team of the club and finally signed a multi-year deal with the club on an undisclosed transfer fee.

== Career statistics ==
=== Club ===
As of 26 July 2025

Club	Season	League			Cup		AFC		Total	
Club	Season	Division	Apps	Goals	Apps	Goals	Apps	Goals	Apps	Goals
Shillong Lajong	2017–18	I-League	11	0	1 (Note: Appearance(s) in Super Cup)	0	–		12	0
Shillong Lajong	2018–19	I-League	19	0	0	0	–		19	0
Shillong Lajong	Total		30	0	1	0	0	0	31	0
Kerala Blasters B (loan)	2020	I-League 2nd Division	3	0	0	0	–		3	0
Ryntih	2021	I-League 2nd Division	3	0	0	0	–		3	0
Kenkre	2021–22	I-League	12	0	0	0	–		12	0
Shillong Lajong	2023–24	I-League	10	1	2 (Note: Appearance(s) in Durand Cup)	0	–		12	1
Shillong Lajong	2024–25	I-League	18	1	5	1	—		23	2
Shillong Lajong	2025–26	I-League	0	0	1	0	—		1	0
Shillong Lajong	Total		28	2	8	1	0	0	36	3
Career total			76	2	9	1	0	0	85	3
