= 2013 I-League 2nd Division final round =

Tournament details
- Country: India
- Teams: 6

Final positions
- Champions: Rangdajied United
- Runners-up: Mohammedan

The 2013 I-League 2nd Division final round is the sixth final round of the I-League 2nd Division. The tournament began after the group stage was completed on 26 March 2013.

== Format ==
The final round of the 2013 I-League 2nd Division is taking place between six teams from the group stage.

== Qualification ==
Location of teams in the 2013 I-League 2nd Division

== Final round table ==
Pos	Team	Pld	W	D	L	GF	GA	GD	Pts	Qualification or relegation
1	Rangdajied United (C, P)	10	6	1	3	17	11	+6	19	Promotion to 2013–14 I-League
2	Mohammedan (P)	10	5	3	2	9	6	+3	18	Promotion to 2013–14 I-League
3	Bhawanipore	10	4	5	1	21	15	+6	17	
4	Langsning	10	3	4	3	20	18	+2	13	
5	Mumbai Tigers	10	3	0	7	13	19	−6	9	
6	Southern Samity	10	1	3	6	9	20	−11	6	

Source: i-league.org
Rules for classification: 1) points; 2) goal difference; 3) number of goals scored.
(C) Champions; (P) Promoted

== Fixtures and results ==
=== First leg ===
==== Match day 1 ====
30 March 2013	Langsning	0 – 1	Mumbai Tigers	Bangalore Football Stadium
2:00pm IST (UTC+5:30)		Report	Kumar 45' (pen.)

30 March 2013	Southern Samity	1 – 1	Rangdajied United	Bangalore Football Stadium
4:00pm IST (UTC+5:30)	Khan 51'	Report	Babatunde 30'

31 March 2013	Mohammedan	0 – 0	Bhawanipore	Bangalore Football Stadium
4:15pm IST (UTC+5:30)		Report

==== Match day 2 ====
Tuesday, 2 April 2013

2:00pm IST (UTC+5:30)	Bhawanipore	1 – 0	Rangdajied United	Bangalore Football Stadium
2:00pm IST (UTC+5:30)	Barreto 45'	Report

4:00pm IST (UTC+5:30)	Mumbai Tigers	3 – 0	Southern Samity	Bangalore Football Stadium
4:00pm IST (UTC+5:30)	Pradeep 64'; Dikhate 79', 89'	Report

Wednesday, 3 April 2013

4:00pm IST (UTC+5:30)	Mohammedan	2 – 1	Langsning	Bangalore Football Stadium
4:00pm IST (UTC+5:30)	Baltham 52'; Dzisah 56'	Report	Ayeni 43'

==== Match day 3 ====
Friday, 5 April 2013

2:00pm IST (UTC+5:30)	Langsning	3 – 3	Bhawanipore	Bangalore Football Stadium
2:00pm IST (UTC+5:30)	Ayeni 11'; Bedemi 73'; Shadap 90+3'	Report	Silva 7'; Mashriqi 26'; Sana 70'

4:00pm IST (UTC+5:30)	Southern Samity	0 – 1	Mohammedan	Bangalore Football Stadium
4:00pm IST (UTC+5:30)		Report	Alfred Jaryan 69'

Saturday, 6 April 2013

4:00pm IST (UTC+5:30)	Rangdajied United	3 – 1	Mumbai Tigers	Bangalore Football Stadium
4:00pm IST (UTC+5:30)	Sunn 44'; Singh 53'; Shin 81'	Report	Predeep 2'

==== Match day 4 ====
Monday, 8 April 2013

2:00pm IST (UTC+5:30)	Bhawanipore	3 – 2	Mumbai Tigers	Bangalore Football Stadium
2:00pm IST (UTC+5:30)	Barreto 26', 64', 84'	Report	Dikhate 7'; Pradeep 62'

4:00pm IST (UTC+5:30)	Mohammedan	1 – 0	Rangdajied United	Bangalore Football Stadium
4:00pm IST (UTC+5:30)	Zirsanga 50'	Report

Tuesday, 9 April 2013

4:00pm IST (UTC+5:30)	Langsning	2 – 0	Southern Samity	Bangalore Football Stadium
4:00pm IST (UTC+5:30)	Nongrum 69'; Das (o.g.)	Report

==== Match day 5 ====
Thursday, 11 April 2013

2:00pm IST (UTC+5:30)	Mumbai Tigers	1 – 0	Mohammedan	Bangalore Football Stadium
2:00pm IST (UTC+5:30)	Jairu 90+3'	Report

4:00pm IST (UTC+5:30)	Southern Samity	2 – 2	Bhawanipore	Bangalore Football Stadium
4:00pm IST (UTC+5:30)	Mondal 11'; Pereira 90'	Report	Barreto 29'; Silva 45+2'

Friday, 12 April 2013

4:00pm IST (UTC+5:30)	Rangdajied United	2 – 4	Langsning	Bangalore Football Stadium
4:00pm IST (UTC+5:30)	Shin 4'; Tamang 25'	Report	Ayeni 40', 86'; Bedemi 62', 79'

=== Second leg ===
==== Match day 1 ====
Monday, 15 April 2013

2:00pm IST (UTC+5:30)	Rangdajied United	1 – 0	Bhawanipore	Bangalore Football Stadium
2:00pm IST (UTC+5:30)	Babatunde 43'	Report

4:00pm IST (UTC+5:30)	Langsning	1 – 1	Mohammedan	Bangalore Football Stadium
4:00pm IST (UTC+5:30)	Ayeni 60'	Report	Hyju 35'

Tuesday, 16 April 2013

4:00pm IST (UTC+5:30)	Southern Samity	2 – 1	Mumbai Tigers	Bangalore Football Stadium
4:00pm IST (UTC+5:30)	Onyema 1', 59'	Report	Kumar 28'

==== Match day 2 ====
Thursday, 18 April 2013

2:00pm IST (UTC+5:30)	Bhawanipore	3 – 3	Langsning	Bangalore Football Stadium
2:00pm IST (UTC+5:30)	Silva 13', 69'; Dowary 45'	Report	Bedemi 17'; Suting 20'; Ayeni 53'

4:00pm IST (UTC+5:30)	Mohammedan	1 – 0	Southern Samity	Bangalore Football Stadium
4:00pm IST (UTC+5:30)	Dzisah 35'	Report

Friday, 19 April 2013

4:00pm IST (UTC+5:30)	Mumbai Tigers	0 – 1	Rangdajied United	Bangalore Football Stadium
4:00pm IST (UTC+5:30)		Report	Kelechi 48'

==== Match day 3 ====
Sunday, 21 April 2013

2:00pm IST (UTC+5:30)	Southern Samity	1 – 4	Bhawanipore	Bangalore Football Stadium
2:00pm IST (UTC+5:30)	Singh 63'	Report	Silva 12', 57', 74'; Barreto 14'

4:00pm IST (UTC+5:30)	Mohammedan	2 – 0	Mumbai Tigers	Bangalore Football Stadium
4:00pm IST (UTC+5:30)	Dzisah 83'; Alfred Jaryan 90+4'	Report

Monday, 22 April 2013

4:00pm IST (UTC+5:30)	Rangdajied United	3 – 1	Langsning	Bangalore Football Stadium
4:00pm IST (UTC+5:30)	Babatunde 48', 64', 74'	Report	Bedemi 8'

==== Match day 4 ====
Wednesday, 24 April 2013

2:00pm IST (UTC+5:30)	Langsning	3 – 1	Mumbai Tigers	Bangalore Football Stadium
2:00pm IST (UTC+5:30)	Bedemi 68'; Rahman 73' (o.g.); Suting 79'	Report	Boro 31'

4:00pm IST (UTC+5:30)	Southern Samity	1 – 3	Rangdajied United	Bangalore Football Stadium
4:00pm IST (UTC+5:30)	Biswas 25'	Report	Babatunde 16', 40', 86'

Thursday, 25 April 2013

4:00pm IST (UTC+5:30)	Bhawanipore	0 – 0	Mohammedan	Bangalore Football Stadium
4:00pm IST (UTC+5:30)		Report

==== Match day 5 ====
Saturday, 27 April 2013

2:00pm IST (UTC+5:30)	Rangdajied United	3 – 1	Mohammedan	Bangalore Football Stadium
2:00pm IST (UTC+5:30)	Dzisah 5' (o.g.); Khriam 45'; Shin 85'		Zirsanga 83'

4:00pm IST (UTC+5:30)	Mumbai Tigers	3 – 5	Bhawanipore	Bangalore Football Stadium
4:00pm IST (UTC+5:30)	Singh 37'; Jairu 81'; Boro 90'	Report	Dutta 45'; Barreto 64'; Sana 73'; Ruidas 85'; Silva 90'

Sunday, 28 April 2013

4:00pm IST (UTC+5:30)	Southern Samity	2 – 2	Langsning	Bangalore Football Stadium
4:00pm IST (UTC+5:30)

== Top scorers ==
As of 27 April 2013.

Rank	Player	Club	Goals
1	(Nigeria) Badmus Babatunde	Rangdajied United	8
1	(Brazil) Hudson Lima Da Silva	Bhawanipore	8
3	(Brazil) Jose Ramirez Barreto	Bhawanipore	7
4	(Nigeria) Joel Ayeni	Langsning	6
4	(Nigeria) Daniel Bedemi	Langsning	6
