= 2013 I-League 2nd Division =

6th season of the I-League 2nd Division

I-League 2nd Division
- Season: 2012–13
- Champions: Rangdajied United
- Promoted: Rangdajied United; Mohammedan

The 2013 I-League 2nd Division was the sixth season of the league under its current title. The season began on 9 March 2013. The original 21 clubs who would participate in the 2nd Division were officially announced on 25 January 2013, however since then 5 more clubs were accepted into the league. As a result of the tournament, the winner and the runner-up, Rangdajied United and Mohammedan respectively, were promoted to 2013–14 I-League.

== Team overview ==
=== Teams and locations ===
Team	Location
Aizawl	Aizawl, Mizoram
Bhawanipore	Kolkata, West Bengal
Delhi United	Delhi, Delhi
DSK Shivajains	Pune, Maharashtra
Eagles	Ernakulam, Kerala
George Telegraph	Kolkata, West Bengal
Green Valley	Guwahati, Assam
Hindustan	Delhi, Delhi
Josco	Ernakulam, Kerala
Kalighat MS	Kolkata, West Bengal
Kenkre	Mumbai, Maharashtra
KGF Academy	Bangalore, Karnataka
Kohima Komets	Kohima, Nagaland
Langnsing	Shillong, Meghalaya
Luangmual	Aizawl, Mizoram
Mohammedan	Kolkata, West Bengal
Mumbai Tigers	Mumbai, Maharashtra
PIFA	Mumbai, Maharashtra
Rangdajied United	Shillong, Meghalaya
Royal Wahingdoh	Shillong, Meghalaya
Samaleswari	Bhubaneswar, Orissa
Simla Youngs	New Delhi
South United	Bangalore, Karnataka
Southern Samity	Kolkata, West Bengal
Techno Aryan	Kolkata, West Bengal
Vasco	Vasco da Gama, Goa

== Group stage ==
=== Group A ===
- Matches to be played in Singrauli, Madhya Pradesh

Team	Pld	W	D	L	GF	GA	GD	Pts	Qualification
Langsning	8	6	2	0	20	4	+16	20	Final Round
Rangdajied United	8	6	0	2	18	6	+12	18	Final Round
DSK Shivajians	8	5	2	1	15	7	+8	17	
Kenkre	8	3	3	2	12	10	+2	12	
KGF Academy	8	2	4	2	9	12	−3	10	
Delhi United	8	2	3	3	8	11	−3	9	
George Telegraph	8	2	0	6	11	13	−2	6	
Samaleswari	8	1	1	6	4	13	−9	4	
Kohima Komets	8	1	1	6	4	25	−21	4	

Source: rsssf

=== Group B ===
- Matches to be played in Indore, Madhya Pradesh

Team	Pld	W	D	L	GF	GA	GD	Pts	Qualification
Mohammedan	8	6	2	0	13	3	+10	20	Final Round
Bhawanipore	8	6	1	1	12	6	+6	19	Final Round
Royal Wahingdoh	8	5	1	2	18	4	+14	16	
Techno Aryan	8	4	1	3	14	7	+7	13	
Aizawl	8	4	1	3	15	13	+2	13	
Josco	8	3	1	4	9	11	−2	10	
PIFA	8	2	0	6	8	17	−9	6	
Green Valley	8	1	1	6	7	17	−10	4	
Simla Youngs	8	1	0	7	10	28	−18	3	

Source: rsssf

=== Group C ===
- Matches to be played in Bangalore, Karnataka

Team	Pld	W	D	L	GF	GA	GD	Pts	Qualification
Southern Samity	7	5	2	0	10	4	+6	17	Final Round
Mumbai Tigers	7	5	1	1	14	7	+7	16	Final Round
Vasco	7	5	1	1	9	3	+6	16	
Kalighat MS	7	3	1	3	19	9	+10	10	
South United	7	2	1	4	12	12	0	7	
Eagles	7	1	2	4	7	15	−8	5	
Hindustan	7	1	1	5	4	11	−7	4	
Luangmual	7	1	1	5	8	23	−15	4	

Source: rsssf

== Final round ==
Pos	Team	Pld	W	D	L	GF	GA	GD	Pts	Qualification or relegation
1	Rangdajied United (C, P)	10	6	1	3	17	11	+6	19	Promotion to 2013–14 I-League
2	Mohammedan (P)	10	5	3	2	9	6	+3	18	Promotion to 2013–14 I-League
3	Bhawanipore	10	4	5	1	21	15	+6	17	
4	Langsning	10	3	4	3	20	18	+2	13	
5	Mumbai Tigers	10	3	0	7	13	19	−6	9	
6	Southern Samity	10	1	3	6	9	20	−11	6	

Source: i-league.org
Rules for classification: 1) points; 2) goal difference; 3) number of goals scored.
(C) Champions; (P) Promoted
