= SSA First Division =

Indian regional association football league in Shillong

- Organising body: Shillong Sports Association (SSA)
- Founded: 1994; 32 years ago
- Country: India
- Number of clubs: 10
- Level on pyramid: 7
- Promotion to: Shillong Premier League
- Relegation to: SSA Second Division
- Domestic cup: Championship League
- Current champions: Laitkor SC
- Current: 2025 SSA First Division

The SSA First Division is the third-level state football league in the Indian state of Meghalaya, below the Shillong Premier League, organised by the Shillong Sports Association (SSA), which is affiliated to the Meghalaya Football Association (MFA). Laitkor SC are the current champions.

== 2025 Season ==
Ten clubs are competing in the 2025 SSA First Division

Team	Head coach	Captain
Lawsohtun SC	(India)	(India)
Nongthymmai SC	(India)	(India)
Mawkhar SC	(India)	(India)
Mawtawar SC	(India)	(India)
Nongkrem SSCC	(India)	(India)
Nongkseh SCC	(India)	(India)
Nongrah SC	(India)	(India)
Pohkseh SSCC	(India)	(India)
Meghalaya Police FT	(India)	(India)
Nongkrem SSCC	(India)	(India)
