= Shillong Premier League =

Indian regional association football league in Shillong

- Organising body: Shillong Sports Association (SSA)
- Founded: 2010; 16 years ago
- Country: India
- Number of clubs: 10
- Level on pyramid: 6
- Promotion to: Meghalaya State League
- Relegation to: SSA First Division
- League cup: Shillong Super Cup
- Current champions: Nongkseh SS&CC (1st title)
- Most championships: Shillong Lajong (5 titles)
- Broadcaster(s): T7 News Channel (YouTube)
- Current: 2026 Shillong Premier League

The Shillong Premier League (currently known as the Officer's Choice Blue Shillong Premier League for sponsorship reasons) is the second-level state football league in the Indian state of Meghalaya, below the Meghalaya State League, organised by the Shillong Sports Association (SSA), which is affiliated to the Meghalaya Football Association (MFA). It was started with 8 teams in 2010. Mawlai SC are the current champions.

== Competition format ==
=== Regular season ===
The competition consists of 18 rounds that follows a double round-robin format, with each club playing the others twice, at SSA Stadium, First Ground, Polo, for a total of 18 matches each. Teams receive three points for a win, one point for a draw, and no points for a loss. There are no play-offs and the team which tops the table wins the league.

The position of each team is determined by the highest number of points accumulated during the regular season. If two or more teams are level on points, the following criteria are applied in order until one of the teams can be determined as the higher ranked

- Highest number of points accumulated in matches between the teams concerned
- Highest goal difference in matches between the teams concerned
- Highest number of goals scored in matches between the teams concerned
- Highest goal difference
- Highest number of goals scored

=== Shillong Super Cup ===
The top six teams of the league qualify for the tournament, with the top two finishers in the SPL earning direct entry into the semifinals, while teams placed third to sixth will face off in playoff matches to secure the remaining two spots.

=== Championship League ===
A league-cum-knockout event featuring the champions and runners-up of its men’s football pyramid. With five SSA divisions in all, this would involve 10 clubs split into two groups, with knockouts to follow the round robin stage.

== Teams ==
Ten teams are competing in the 2024 season – eight from the previous season and two promoted from the 2023 SSA First Division.

Team	Head coach	Captain	Position in 2023
Rangdajied United	(India) Aibanjop Shadap	(India) Arlangky	1^{st}
Mawlai SC	(India) Herring Shangpliang	(India) Brolington	2^{nd}
Shillong Lajong	(India) Bobby L Nongbet	(India) Iohborlang	3^{rd}
Langsning	(India) Khlain Pyrkhat Syiemlieh	(India) Enestar	4^{th}
Ryntih FC	(India) W Kharpran	(India) Allen	5^{th}
Sawmer SC	(India) Eddyson Sohkhlet	(India) Mebanjop	6^{th}
Nongthymmai	(India) A Mylliem Umlong	(India)	7^{th}
Nangkiew Irat	(India) Joseph Naik	(India)	8^{th}
Laitkor SC	(India) K Kharkongor	(India)	
Nongrim Hills	(India) Playerson Syiemlieh	(India)	

== Champions ==
List of Shillong Premier League champions:
Season	Champions	Ref.
2010	Royal Wahingdoh	
2011	Royal Wahingdoh	
2012	Royal Wahingdoh	
2013	Rangdajied United	
2014	Shillong Lajong	
2015	Shillong Lajong	
2016	Shillong Lajong	
2017	Langsning	
2018	Langsning	
2019	Shillong Lajong	
2020	Cancelled	
2021	Cancelled	
2022	Mawlai SC	
2023	Mawlai SC	
2024	Shillong Lajong	
2025	Langsning	
2026	Nongkseh SS&CC	

== See also ==
- SSA Women's Football League
