= Rangdajied United FC =

Indian association football club

Rangdajied United
- Full name: Rangdajied United Football Club
- Short name: RUFC
- Founded: 1987; 39 years ago (as Ar-Hima); 2012; 14 years ago (as Rangdajied United)
- Ground: Jawaharlal Nehru Stadium
- Capacity: 30,000
- Chairman: Karsing Kurbah
- Head coach: Aiborlang Khongjee
- League: Meghalaya State League; Shillong Premier League
- Website: rufc.in
Home colours	Away colours	Third colours

Rangdajied United Football Club (formerly known as Ar-Hima) is an Indian professional football club based in Mawngap-Mawphlang, in the south-west of Shillong, East Khasi Hills, Meghalaya. The club was founded in 1987, and participated in the I-League 2nd Division. They won the league in the 2012–13 season.

Rangdajied was in the then top tier I-league during the 2013–14 season. The club consecutively participates in the Shillong Premier League, the top tier state football league in Meghalaya.

== Name ==
The club was formerly known as "Ar-Hima", that literally means 'The Two Kingdoms'. During the 2012–13 season, the club changed its name to Rangdajied United FC.

"Rangdajied" in the Khasi language is an expression which signifies a brave, courageous, patriotic man at the prime of his youth.

== History ==
=== Foundation and early years ===
Rangdajied United was founded in 1987 as Ar-Hima. The club is headquartered in Mawngap-Mawphlang, south-west Shillong. Rangdajied United has participated in various editions of the Shillong Premier League and enjoyed massive rivalries with their fellow Shillong based clubs Shillong Lajong and Royal Wahingdoh. In September 2012, the club reached semi-finals of Bordoloi Trophy. The club has participated in the 2013 I-League 2nd Division and qualified for the main round. Having won the 2013 I-League 2nd Division final round held in Bangalore, Rangdajied United earned qualification to I-League. On 20 November 2013, Rangdajied agreed the signings of India national team stars Gouramangi Singh, Subrata Pal, Sandesh Jhingan, Manandeep Singh, and Tomba Singh, and competed in the 2013–14 season. They ended their league campaign with 25 points in 24 matches, securing eleventh position in league table, but made headlines by defeating table toppers Bengaluru 3–2 at home. In the following season Rangdajied was evicted from I-League for not fulfilling the Asian Football Confederation's club licensing criteria.

After clinching the 2013 edition of Shillong Premier League, Rangdajied finished as runners-up in 2016 season. In 2015–16 season, the club was managed by Khlain Pyrkhat Syiemlieh, who cleared the AFC A licence at that time. Rangdajied then became a regular participant in Meghalaya State League, formed in 2017. Later in 2019 season, they again achieved runners-up position, gaining 22 points in 12 matches. The club finished as runners-up in second edition of the Meghalaya State League.

=== Later years (2020–present) ===
The club's new era began with the former India international Eugeneson Lyngdoh, who became club president in 2021 and succeeded his father Syntar Klas Sunn at the post. In June 2023, Rangdajied clinched their first ever Meghalaya State League title, defeating Khliehmawlieh YC 1–0 in final. In November of the same year, the club returned to the nationwide league, joining newly formed I-League 3. Later on 10 November, club CEO Andrew Suting officially announced Meghalaya Tourism as main sponsor, stating, "The support from Meghalaya Tourism will undoubtedly contribute to the growth and development of the football club while simultaneously drawing attention to the treasures of the state."

In August 2023, Rangdajied United gained I-League 3 spot to compete in the inaugural edition. Before the league starts, the club roped in Subir Dey as head coach, former India international Aiborlang Khongjee as technical director and Aibanjop Shadap as the assistant coach while team players came from the Khasi-Jaintia Hills. They began the league campaign on 13 November in Goa, beating Millat FC 5–0 in Group C. In August 2024, the club was welcomed by the Durand Cup Organising Committee and included in the group stages of the 133rd edition of the tournament, replacing Indian Super League outfit Hyderabad. Rangdajied began the competition campaign with a 4–3 defeat to FC Goa in Shillong on 5 August. In the next match, Rangdajied played against arch-rival Shillong Lajong at the Jawaharlal Nehru Stadium, that went on to a 2–0 defeat resulting club's failure to move to the knock-out stage.

== Sponsorship ==
Rangdajied United was sponsored by Italian athletic footwear and apparel manufacturer Diadora. It was the first Indian soccer club to be sponsored by Diadora.

They also had Football Solutions, a New Delhi football consultancy firm, as a sponsor. In November 2023, the club announced that they have roped in Meghalaya Tourism as the main sponsor.

Period	Kit manufacturers	Shirt sponsor
2012–2014	Diadora	Football Solutions
2023–present	Puma	Meghalaya Tourism

== Rivalries ==
=== Shillong Derby ===
In I-League, there were consecutive promotions and relegations of three Meghalayan teams Rangdajied United (2013–14 I-League), Royal Wahingdoh (2014–15 I-League) and Shillong Lajong (2018–19 I-League). In both the domestic and regional leagues, Rangdajied played against both Shillong Lajong and Royal Wahingdoh respectively in the "Shillong Derby".

The first match of the derby in I-League to be played was on 22 November 2013 between Shillong Lajong and Rangdajied United that ended in a 1–1 draw. Both the rivalries continued thereafter in Shillong Premier League for a brief period until the teams were dissolved.

== Home stadium ==
Rangdajied United plays all their home games at the Jawaharlal Nehru Stadium in Shillong, which has a capacity of approximately 30,000 spectators. It has artificial turf.

== Notable players ==
For all current and former notable players of Rangdajied United with a Wikipedia article, see Rangdajied United FC players.

=== Past internationals ===
- The players below had senior international cap(s) for their respective countries. Players whose name is listed, represented their countries before or after playing for Rangdajied United FC.
- (Nigeria) Kelechi Okoye (2012–2013)
- (North Korea) Kim Song-yong (2013–2014)
- (Sudan) (South Sudan) James Moga (2016–2017)

=== Other notable players ===
- (Nigeria) Loveday Enyinnaya (2011–2014)
- (Japan) Yohei Iwasaki (2013)
- (South Korea) Shin Ho-jun (2013)
- (Senegal) Lamine Tamba (2013–2014)
- (Brazil) Edmar Figueira (2013–2014)
- (Nigeria) Ranti Martins (2013–2014)

== Coaching history ==
Note: The following list may not be complete

- (India) Khlain Pyrkhat Syiemlieh (2013)
- (India) Santosh Kashyap (2013–2014)
- (India) Hering Shangpliang (2014)
- (India) Khlain Pyrkhat Syiemlieh (2015–2016)
- (India) Aiborlang Khongjee (2022–2023)
- (India) Subir Dey (2023–2024)
- (India) Aibanjop Shadap (2024–2025)

== Honours ==
=== League ===
- I-League 2nd Division
  - Champions (1): 2012–13
- Meghalaya State League
  - Champions (1): 2023
  - Runners-up (1): 2019
- Shillong Premier League
  - Champions (1): 2013
  - Runners-up (6): 2011, 2016, 2017, 2019, 2022, 2023
  - Third place (1): 2018

=== Cup ===
- SSA Super Cup
  - Runners-up (1): 2025

== Other departments ==
=== Rangdajied United youth ===
Rangdajied United operates youth age-group teams and academies, alongside participating in regional championships. The club opened 'RUFC Soccer School' and two football academies centred in Mawlai and Mawphlang in 2022. Rangdajied United's under-15 team took part in India leg of the Manchester United Premier Cup in 2014.

Honours

- ENE Cup (U-10)
  - Champions (1): 2022
- Chief Minister's U-12 Cup
  - Champions (1): 2023
- U-19 Shillong Premier League
  - Runners-up (1): 2012
- Silchar U-13 Five-a-side Tournament
  - Runners-up (1): 2023

=== Rangdajied United women ===
The women's football section of Rangdajied United was instituted for the first time in 2024 and participated in the 2024 edition of the SSA Women's Football League. The squad was largely made up of U15 girls. They finished as semi-finalists in their maiden campaign where they lost to the champions Laitkor SC.

== Affiliated clubs ==
The following club is currently affiliated with Rangdajied United FC:

- (India) Bengaluru FC (2024–present)

== See also ==
- List of football clubs in Meghalaya
- Northeast Derby (India)
