= Shillong Lajong FC =

Association football club in Meghalaya, India

Shillong Lajong
- Full name: Shillong Lajong Football Club
- Nickname: The Reds
- Short name: SLFC; Lajong
- Founded: 1983; 43 years ago (as Lajong Sports Club)
- Ground: Jawaharlal Nehru Stadium; SSA Stadium
- Capacity: 15,000; 5,000
- Owner: Shillong Lajong Pvt. Ltd.
- Chairman: P. D. Sawyan
- Head coach: Birendra Thapa
- League: Indian Football League; Meghalaya State League
- 2025–26: Indian Football League, 2nd of 10
| Home colours | Away colours | Third colours |

Shillong Lajong Football Club (founded as Lajong SC) is an Indian professional football club based in Shillong, Meghalaya. The club is currently competing in the Indian Football League, the second tier of the Indian football league system, following promotion from the 2022–23 I-League 2. Shillong Lajong also takes part in regional competitions.

Shillong Lajong was incorporated in 1983, with the prime objective of improving the declining standard of football in the state, and to spot, train and nurture local talent. In the local Khasi language, Lajong translates to "our own". Nicknamed "the Red Dragons", Shillong Lajong briefly participated in I-League until their relegation in 2017, then top flight Indian football. They also appeared in the Indian Super Cup in 2018 and reached semi-finals. They were nominated for 2022–23 I-League 2 qualifiers. Headquartered in Shillong, Lajong has access to the largest student population in the North-East and hence the footballing talent right from a young age. The club is four-time champion of the Shillong Premier League.

Shillong Lajong was the first club from the North East region of India to rise to prominence in the country. Before the 2012–13 I-League season began, it was officially announced that Shillong Lajong's academy lad Ajal raj had signed his first professional contract with Shillong Lajong after his impressive performance in the North East Super Series during pre-season. Though Aizawl FC caught most of the attention after their I-League title in 2016, it was Lajong who were the torch-bearers of northeastern football for a large part of the decade.

== History ==
=== Formation and journey ===
During the finals of the Meghalaya Invitation Cup in 1982, two football enthusiasts Shri Kitdor Syiem and Shri P. D. Sawyan saddened by the continuous failure of the Shillong teams to make it to the final stages of the tournament formed a football club to reverse the trend. Together with a group of friends and supporters, they commissioned a semi-professional club in 1983, aptly called Lajong Football Club (lit. 'Our own' or 'Of the people'). The club was also known as the Lajong Sports Social and Cultural Club.

In 1983, the club played in the 3rd Division of the Shillong Sports Association League and was the champion, being promoted to the 2nd Division. Similarly in 1984 it was promoted to the First Division. Things started to change rapidly after the title clash for the Shillong Championship was inevitably poised against the Blue Max FC, another professionally organized club which later changed itself to Langsning SC of today. It was only in 1989 that Lajong FC finally annexed the championship for the first time. In 1990, Lajong FC became the Meghalaya Invitation Cup champion, beating Nabajyoti FC of Guwahati in the final, seven years after its maiden entry.

In 2009, Lajong FC joined the I-League 2nd Division, which then was the second highest national league in India. After one season in the second division, Lajong was promoted to the I-League. Shillong Lajong gained promotion for the 2009–10 season, and then appointed former Salgaocar and East Bengal coach Stanley Rozario for their first season in then India's top flight. They played their first match in I-League in 2009 and lost to JCT FC 1–5. In their first ever home match, they defeated Air India 3–0 in front of 30,000 people. In their second home match, they lost to Mohun Bagan 2–1, again in front of a home crowd of about 30,000. At the end of the I-League season, Shillong was relegated to the 2nd division, after finishing in last place.

=== 2010–present ===
In the 2009–10 Indian Federation Cup, Shillong Lajong reached to the final but lost to East Bengal in penalty-shootout. The club reached semi-finals of the Bordoloi Trophy in 2010. For the 2011 season, Shillong Lajong managed by Pradhyum Reddy, participated in the I-League 2nd Division. Due to Shillong hosting the 2011 I-League 2nd Division final round, they were able to skip the Group stages and go straight into the final round. They ended one-year stint in the I-League 2nd Division with a 1–0 victory over Mohammedan Sporting on 13 May 2011, after which they got promoted back to the I-League, and appointed Scottish manager Desmond Bulpin. The club clinched Mizoram Independence Day Cup title in that season, defeating Royal Wahingdoh in final. In September 2012, Shillong Lajong created history defeating A-League club Wellington Phoenix 3–2 in the North-East Super Series Championship final.

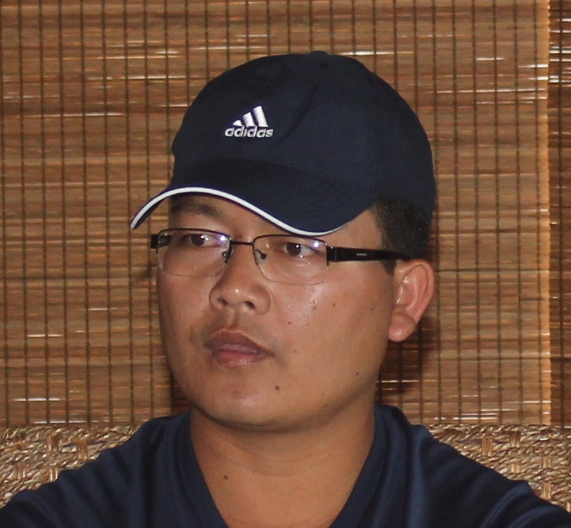
Thangboi Singto as the head coach of Shillong Lajong in 2014

In June 2013, the club roped former Trinidadian international Cornell Glen who represented his country at the 2006 FIFA World Cup. Thus he became club's first ever World Cup player. In the 2013–14 I-League, on 22 September, Lajong thrashed Dempo by 3–0. In 2014–15 season, they ended up in ninth position, in which Glen scored 16 goals and finished as second highest goal scorer.

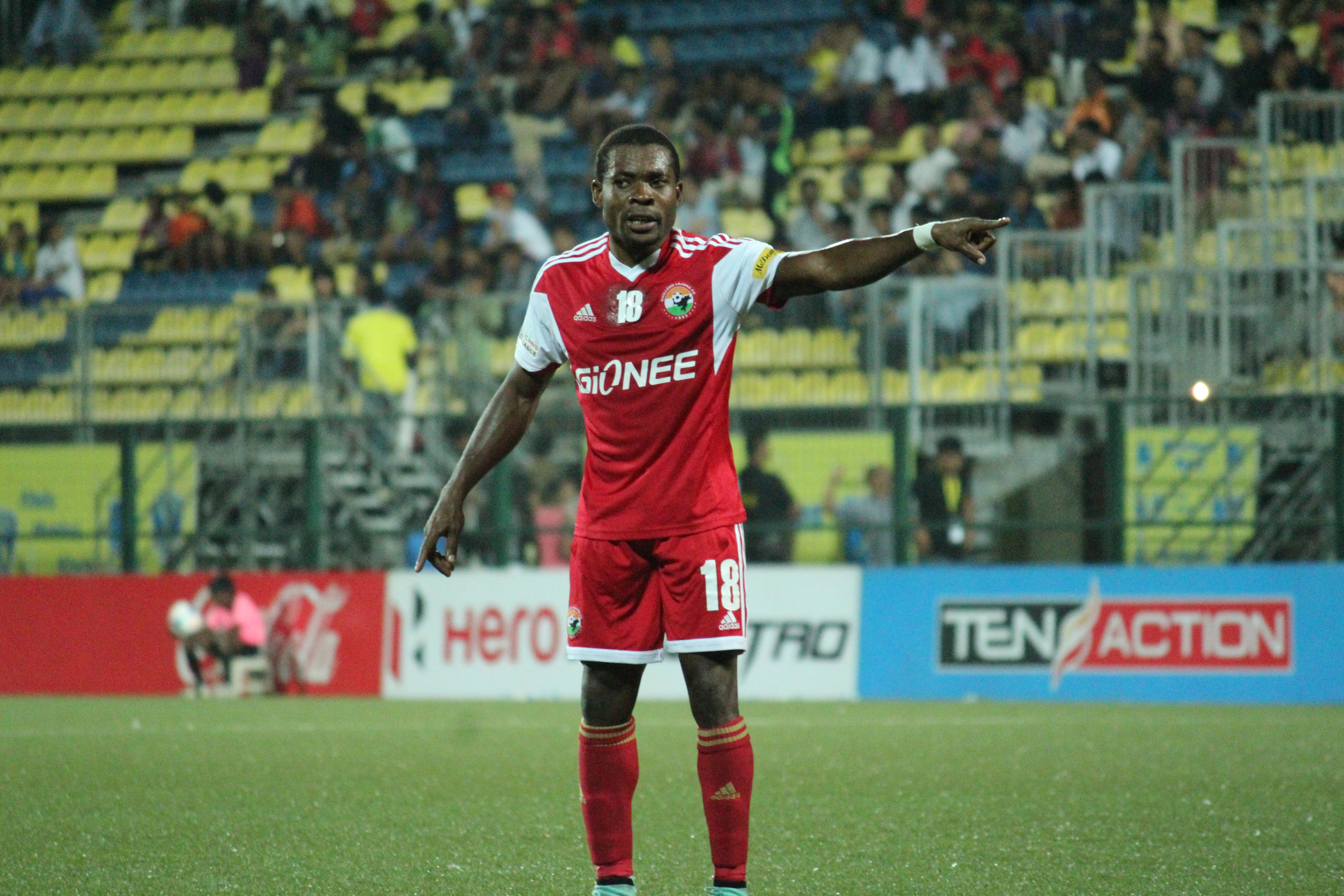
Penn Orji with Shillong Lajong in an I-League match at the Cooperage Ground in 2015.

In regional stages, Shillong achieved success and emerged as champions of Shillong Premier League in 2014, 2015, 2016 and 2019. They also emerged champions of the Bodousa Cup in 2016 defeating Assam State Electricity Board SC by 2–0. In the same year, the club won Meghalaya Invitation Football Tournament. In 2017 edition of state league, Shillong Lajong didn't appear in the semi-finals. Ahead of the 2017–18 I-League season, the club built a strong squad, signing Lawrence Doe, Abdoulaye Koffi, Daniel Odafin, Saihou Jagne and Asian quota player Oh Joo-ho from South Korea. In 2018 edition of Shillong Premier League, they secured runners-up position, losing the final to Langsning.

Alison Kharsyntiew was appointed as interim head coach for the Super Cup, following the dismissal of Bobby Nongbet. He succeeded Thangboi Singto, who managed the club from 2013 to 2017. Nongbet's first game in charge was on 4 April 2018 against Indian Super League side Pune City. Despite going down by two goals early in the match, Shillong Lajong came back to win the match 3–2. Going into the 2018–19 season, Kharsyntiew was announced as the club's head coach. His first league match in charge was on 28 October 2018 against Aizawl. A brace from Naorem Mahesh Singh saw Shillong Lajong win 2–1. The 2018–19 season was not suitable for Shillong Lajong as they were relegated from the league, after suffering a 1–4 defeat at the hands of former champions Aizawl in the last match. In that season, Lajong fielded an all Indian squad and appointed Spaniard José Carlos Hevia as technical director and head of youth development.

At the end of the league, Lajong remained at the bottom of the 11-team table, with 11 points from 19 matches. They won league's Fair Play Award. In 2019 Shillong Premier League, they again emerged champions with 27 points in 12 matches. Shillong Lajong then became a regular participant in the newly formed Meghalaya State League, since 2017. They club later clinched second edition of Meghalaya State League, defeating arch-rivals Rangdajied United. In 2021, the club participated in the Shirui Lily Cup in Manipur, organized by the Ukhrul District Sports Association, from 22 November to 4 December. They won the 29th edition of the tournament by defeating KLASA 4–3 in the final.

On 21 May 2023, Shillong Lajong defeated Bengaluru United by 2–1 at the 2022–23 I-League 2 to secure promotion to the 2023–24 I-League, thereby securing promotion into India's second tier after a gap of 4 years. As the league began in November, the club kicked-off their campaign with an 1–1 draw against Mohammedan Sporting in Kolkata. Shillong Lajong gained their first victory on 19 November, beating Gokulam Kerala 3–1 in home. Their campaign concluded with 31 points in the eighth position as the league season came to an end in April 2024. The club took part in 2024 Durand Cup with their arch-rival Rangdajied United. In that tournament, Shillong Lajong stunned everyone winning the quarter-final match against defending champions East Bengal by 2–1, in which Marcos Rudwere Silva and Figo Syndai scored both the goals for the club. They later faced NorthEast United in semi-final, which turned out as Northeast derby, suffered a 3–0 defeat. In March 2025, the club clinch Shillong Premier League title. In the 2024–25 I-League season, club's Brazilian striker Douglas Tardin netted two hat-tricks in their 5–0 win against Sporting Bengaluru and 5–5 tie with Sreenidi Deccan. In that season, Shillong Lajong ended their league campaign with eighth place finish securing 28 points.

== Crest, colours & kits ==
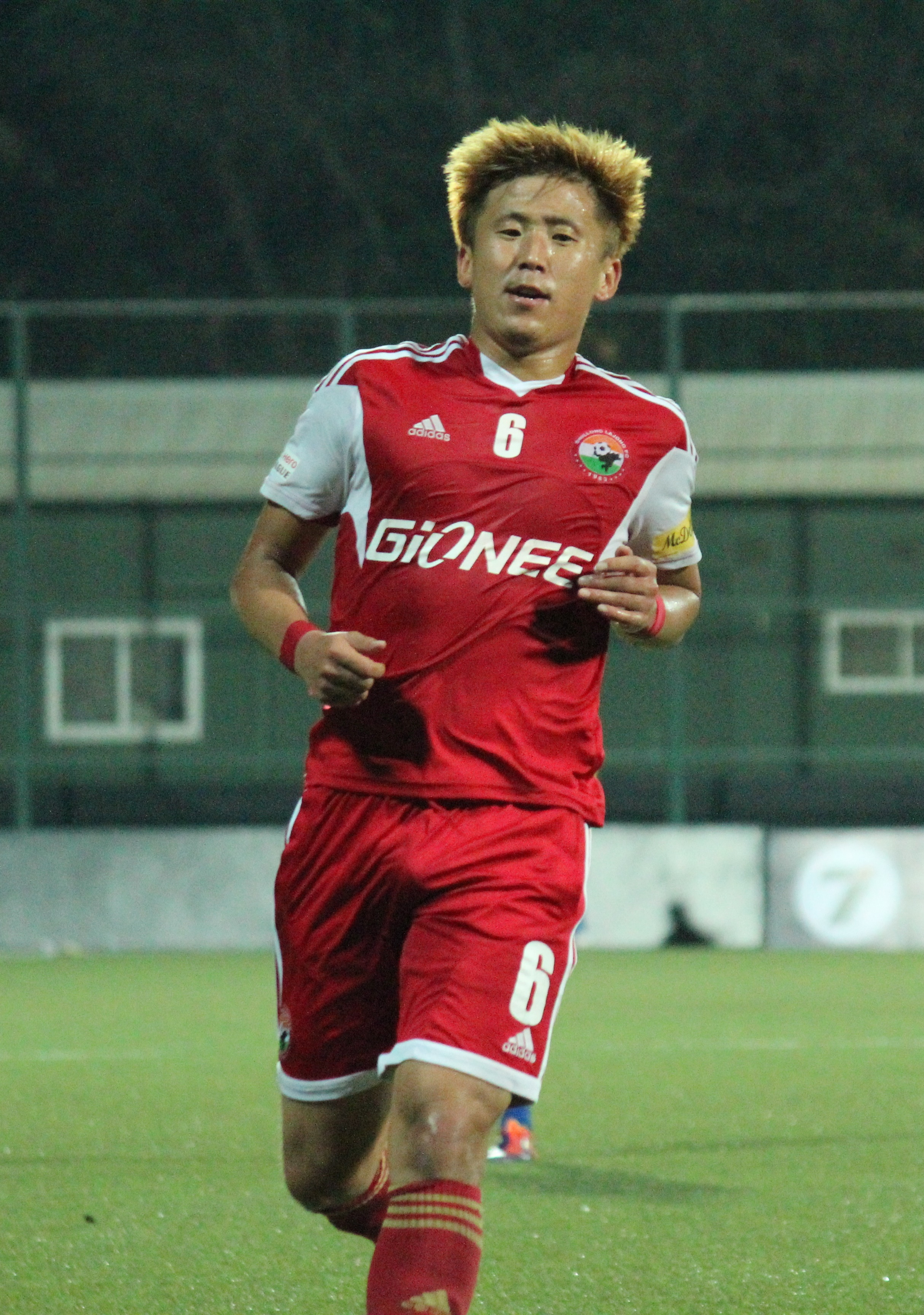
North Korean player Minchol Son in Shillong Lajong's red kit, in an I-League match in 2015.

Nicknamed the "Red Dragons", club's official colours are red and white. The home jersey is all red, while the away jersey is all white.

=== Kit manufacturers and shirt sponsors ===
| Period | Kit manufacturer | Shirt sponsor |
|---|---|---|
| 2009—2010 | Adidas | Nokia |
| 2010—2014 | Adidas | Aircel |
| 2014—2017 | Adidas | Gionee |
| 2017—2018 | Nivia | |
| 2018—2019 | Lotto | McDowell's |
| 2019—2020 | T10 Sports | |
| 2021—2022 | Lotto | |
| 2022—2023 | Nivia | Royal Challenge |
| 2023—present | King Sports | Meghalaya Tourism |

== Home ground ==
Shillong Lajong primarily uses Jawaharlal Nehru Stadium in Shillong as their home stadium. The stadium has astroturf and a capacity of 30,000 spectators.

From 2022–23 I-League 2, the club also uses SSA Stadium for home matches. The club appeared in first home game of I-League at SSA Stadium on 9 November, after a gap of four seasons, against NEROCA in their 1–1 draw. In initial years, the club used Shillong Sports Association Ground, a 5,000 seater stadium.

== Ownership ==
In March 2012, Shillong Lajong became the first Indian football club to undergo the foreign direct investment (FDI) as Dubai-based Anglian Holdings bought 25% club shares.

== First-team squad ==
As of July 2025

Note: Flags indicate national team as defined under FIFA eligibility rules; some limited exceptions apply. Players may hold more than one non-FIFA nationality.

| No. | Pos. | Nation | Player |
|---|---|---|---|
| 1 | GK | IND | Ranit Sarkar |
| 2 | DF | IND | Kitboklang Khyriem |
| 3 | DF | IND | Samuel Muansang |
| 4 | DF | IND | Ephraim Lalremtluanga |
| 5 | MF | IND | Bless Vashum |
| 7 | MF | IND | Figo Syndai |
| 8 | MF | IND | Damaitphang Lyngdoh |
| 9 | FW | IND | Deibormame Tongper |
| 11 | MF | IND | Hardy Nongbri |
| 12 | FW | IND | Everbrightson Sana |
| 13 | GK | IND | Siwel Rymbai |
| 14 | DF | IND | Aman Ahlawat |

| No. | Pos. | Nation | Player |
|---|---|---|---|
| 16 | FW | IND | Phrangki Buam |
| 18 | MF | IND | Gladdy Nelcen Kharbuli |
| 21 | MF | IND | Wadajied Kynsai Ryngkhlem |
| 22 | DF | IND | Sairem Sital Singh |
| 24 | FW | IND | Babysunday Marngar |
| 25 | MF | IND | Maxderidoff Wahlang |
| 26 | DF | IND | Kenstar Kharshong (captain) |
| 27 | MF | IND | Treimiki Lamurong |
| 28 | MF | IND | Hamedamanbha Wahlang |
| 30 | FW | IND | Abhay Gurung |
| 33 | GK | IND | Lakpa Lama |
| 77 | FW | IND | Sheen Sohktung |

== Rivalry ==
=== Shillong derby ===
Shillong Lajong FC shared rivalry with their fellow Shillong-based side Royal Wahingdoh, whom they faced in the I-League previously and face in Shillong Premier League regularly. The club also had a rivalry with another Shillong-based club Rangdajied United.

=== Northeast derby ===
Shillong Lajong also shares rivalry with their fellow Northeastern club Aizawl in I-League.

== Notable players ==
World Cup player

- (Trinidad and Tobago) Cornell Glen (2013–2016)

Foreign players

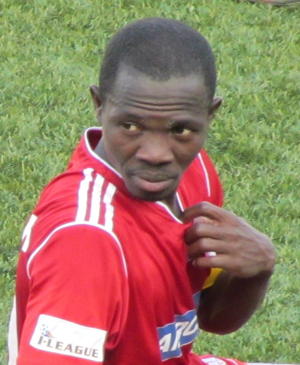
Liberian international Johnny Menyongar with Shillong Lajong in 2012

- (North Korea) Son Min-chol (2012–2015)
- (Nigeria) Daniel Bedemi (2009–2010)
- (Nigeria) Kelechi Okoye (2010–2011)
- (Yemen) Aiman Al-Hagri (2017–2018)
- (Nepal) Anil Gurung (2012–2013)
- (Japan) Yuta Kinowaki (2016–2017)
- (Romania) Dan Gelu Ignat (2016–2017)
- (Liberia) James Gbilee (2008–2012)
- (Nigeria) Kelechi Okoye (2010–2011)
- (Brazil) Fábio Pena (2016–2017)
- (Japan) Taisuke Matsugae (2013–2014)
- (Zambia) Kondwani Mtonga (2014–2015)
- (Portugal) Edinho Júnior Viegas (2013)
- (Cameroon) Aser Pierrick Dipanda (2016–2017)
- (Liberia) Johnny Menyongar (2011–2013)
- (Brazil) Uilliams Bomfim Souza (2013–2016)
- (Ivory Coast) Abdoulaye Koffi (2017–2018)
- (Equatorial Guinea) Lawrence Doe (2017–2018)
- (South Korea) Oh Joo-ho (2017–2018)
- (Nigeria) Gbeneme Friday (2012–2013)
- (Cameroon) Charles Edoa (2013)
- (Zambia) Isaac Chansa (2014–2015)
- (The Gambia) Saihou Jagne (2017–2018)
- (Senegal) Abdou Karim Samb (2023–)
- (Nepal) Arik Bista (2024–)

== Records and statistics ==
=== Overall records ===
As of 5 April 2025

| Season | Division | Teams | Position | Avg. attendance | Federation Cup Super Cup | Durand Cup | AFC Champions League |
|---|---|---|---|---|---|---|---|
| 2008–09 | I-League 2nd Division | 15 | Final round-3rd | – | Did not participate | Did not participate | Did not qualify ▼ |
| 2009–10 | I-League | 14 | 14th | – | Runners-up | Group stage | Did not qualify ▼ |
| 2010–11 | I-League 2nd Division | 21 | 1st | – | Group stage | Did not participate | Did not qualify ▼ |
| 2011–12 | I-League | 14 | 10th | – | Semi-finals | Semi-finals | Did not qualify ▼ |
| 2012–13 | I-League | 14 | 11th | – | Group stage | Did not participate ▼ | Did not qualify ▼ |
| 2013–14 | I-League | 13 | 6th | 11,308 | Group stage | Did not participate ▼ | Did not qualify ▼ |
| 2014–15 | I-League | 11 | 9th | – | Group stage | Did not participate ▼ | Did not qualify ▼ |
| 2015–16 | I-League | 9 | 6th | – | Semi-finals | Did not occur | Did not qualify ▼ |
| 2016–17 | I-League | 10 | 5th | 6,244 | Group stage | Did not participate | Did not qualify ▼ |
| 2017–18 | I-League | 10 | 6th | 5,454 | Replaced by Super Cup Quarter-finals | Did not occur ▼ | Did not qualify ▼ |
| 2018–19 | I-League | 11 | 11th | 4,123 | Did not participate ▼ | Did not occur ▼ | Did not qualify ▼ |
| 2022–23 | I-League 2nd Division | 19 | Final round-2nd | 1,775 | Did not participate ▼ | Did not participate | Did not qualify ▼ |
| 2023–24 | I-League | 13 | 8th | 6,316 | Group stage | Group stage | Did not qualify ▼ |
| 2024–25 | I-League | 12 | 8th | 3,377 | Did not participate | Semi-finals | Did not qualify ▼ |

=== Season by season ===
As of 6 April 2025

| ⭐ | Top scorer in division |
| 🇮🇳 | Top Indian scorer in division |

| Season | League | | | | | | | | | Finals | Top scorer(s) | |
| Season | Division | Pld | W | D | L | GF | GA | Pts | Pos | Finals | Player(s) | Goals |
|---|---|---|---|---|---|---|---|---|---|---|---|---|
| 2008–09 | I-League 2nd Division | 9 | 5 | 2 | 2 | 14 | 9 | 17 | Final round-3rd | — | — | — |
| 2009–10 | I-League | 26 | 6 | 8 | 12 | 23 | 39 | 26 | 14th | — | (Nigeria) Daniel Bedemi | 5 |
| 2010–11 | I-League 2nd Division | 7 | 5 | 1 | 1 | 12 | 6 | 16 | 1st | — | — | — |
| 2011–12 | I-League | 26 | 7 | 7 | 12 | 24 | 44 | 28 | 10th | — | (India) Eugeneson Lyngdoh (Liberia) Johnny Menyongar | 4 |
| 2012–13 | I-League | 26 | 6 | 10 | 10 | 26 | 40 | 28 | 11th | — | (India) Sushil Kumar Singh | 5 |
| 2013–14 | I-League | 24 | 8 | 9 | 7 | 35 | 37 | 33 | 6th | — | (Trinidad and Tobago) Cornell Glen | 14 ⭐ |
| 2014–15 | I-League | 20 | 6 | 5 | 9 | 34 | 29 | 23 | 9th | — | (Trinidad and Tobago) Cornell Glen | 16 |
| 2015–16 | I-League | 16 | 4 | 6 | 6 | 14 | 23 | 18 | 6th | — | (Spain) Fábio Pena | 6 |
| 2016–17 | I-League | 18 | 7 | 5 | 6 | 24 | 23 | 26 | 5th | — | (Cameroon) Aser Pierrick Dipanda | 11 ⭐ |
| 2017–18 | I-League | 18 | 6 | 4 | 8 | 17 | 25 | 22 | 6th | — | (Ivory Coast) Abdoulaye Koffi | 6 |
| 2018–19 | I-League | 20 | 3 | 2 | 15 | 23 | 56 | 11 | 11th | — | (India) Phrangki Buam | 6 |
| 2022–23 | I-League 2nd Division | 13 | 8 | 3 | 2 | 27 | 12 | 27 | Final round-2nd | — | (India) Hardy Nongbri | 8 |
| 2023–24 | I-League | 24 | 8 | 7 | 9 | 36 | 37 | 31 | 8th | — | (Brazil) Renan Paulino | 7 |
| 2024–25 | I-League | 22 | 7 | 7 | 8 | 46 | 45 | 28 | 8th | — | (Brazil) Douglas Tardin | 13 |

=== Other record(s) ===
- Biggest margin win in I-League: 8–0 vs Rajasthan United FC

=== Notable wins against foreign teams ===
As of matches played 28 July 2025

| Competition | Round | Year | Opposition | Score | Venue | City | Ref |
|---|---|---|---|---|---|---|---|
| India tour of Sheffield F.C. | Friendly | 2010 | (England) Sheffield | 1–0 | Jawaharlal Nehru Stadium | Shillong | |
| NE Lajong Super Series Championship | Final | 2012 | (New Zealand) Wellington Phoenix | 3–2 | Khuman Lampak Main Stadium | Imphal | |
| Durand Cup | Group stage | 2024 | (Nepal) Tribhuvan Army | 1–0 | Jawaharlal Nehru Stadium | Shillong | |
| Durand Cup | Group stage | 2025 | (Malaysia) Malaysian Armed Forces | 6–0 | Jawaharlal Nehru Stadium | Shillong | |

== Honours ==
=== League ===
- I-League/Indian Football League
  - Runners-up (1): 2025–26
- I-League 2nd Division/I-League 2
  - Champions (1): 2010–11
  - Runners-up (1): 2022–23
  - Third place (1): 2009
- National Football League III (North-East Zone)
  - Champions (1): 2006–07
- Meghalaya State League
  - Champions (1): 2019
- Shillong Premier League
  - Champions (5): 2014, 2015, 2016, 2019, 2024
  - Runners-up (3): 2010, 2018 2025
- Shillong Second Division League
  - Champions (1): 1989
- Shillong Third Division League
  - Champions (1): 1983

=== Cup ===
- Federation Cup
  - Runners-up (1): 2009–10
- SSA Super Cup
  - Champions (1): 2025
- Meghalaya Invitation Cup
  - Champions (4): 1990, 2010, 2011, 2016
- Churachand Singh Trophy
  - Champions (1): 2010
- Mizoram Independence Day Cup
  - Champions (1): 2011
- North-East Super Series Championship
  - Champions (1): 2012
- Bodousa Cup
  - Champions (1): 2016
- Shirui Lily Cup
  - Champions (1): 2021
- ATPA Shield
  - Runners-up (1): 2016
- Oil India Gold Cup
  - Runners-up (1): 2025
- Sikkim Gold Cup
  - Champions (1): 2026

=== Awards ===
- I-League Fair Play Award: 2018–19

== Managerial history ==
Note: The following list may not be complete

| Name | Nationality | Years | Ref. |
|---|---|---|---|
| Herring Shangpliang | India | 2009 | |
| Stanley Rozario | India | 2009–2010 | |
| Pradhyum Reddy | Scotland | 2011–2012 | |
| Desmond Bulpin | Scotland | 2012–2013 | |
| Thangboi Singto | India | 2013–2017 | |
| Alison Kharsyntiew | India | 2017 | |
| Bobby Nongbet | India | 2017–2018 | |
| Alison Kharsyntiew | India | 2018–2020 | |
| José Hevia | Spain | 2020 | |
| Bobby Nongbet | India | 2022–2024 | |
| José Hevia | Spain | 2024–2025 | |
| Birendra Thapa | India | 2025–present | |

== Youth section, academy and reserves ==
Shillong Lajong has its youth men's football section and academy teams. These teams participate in regional tournaments, including North East Games. Club's U18 team clinched Youth League U18 title in 2017–18 season. Their U17 team also took part in the group stages of 2022–23 U-17 Youth Cup. Club's U19 team took part in, and clinched title of OIL-DFA All India U-19 Inter-Academy Invitational Football Tournament in November 2023, held in Duliajan, Assam.

Shillong Lajong FC Academy was incorporated in 2007, with the sole aim to develop the game at the grassroots level keeping in mind the abundant football talent in the North East. It began the Goal 14 project in 2009 with the objective to develop local players. Alison Kharsyntiew served as head coach of club's academy, and lead the reserves in Shillong Premier League. He led the reserves to the Shillong Premier League title in 2014.

Honours

- Indian Youth League U18
  - Champions (1): 2017–18
- Meghalaya State League U16
  - Champions (2): 2006, 2007
- Shillong Premier League U19
  - Champions (3): 2011, 2014, 2015
- I-League U20
  - Third place (1): 2012
- Man United Premier Cup India
  - Champions (1): 2010
- MFPA Championship
  - Champions (1): 2011
- Inter Milan Youth Tournament (India)
  - Champions (1): 2011
- Tottenham Leapstart Tournament
  - Champions (1): 2011
- Bayern Munich Youth Cup (India)
  - Champions (1): 2011
- Golaghat All India Invitational Cup
  - Champions (1): 2013
  - Runners-up (1): 2023
- Oil-DFA All India U-19 Invitational Cup
  - Champions (1): 2023

== Affiliated clubs ==
The following clubs were affiliated with Shillong Lajong FC:

- (Denmark) FC Vestsjælland (2012–2014)
- (India) NorthEast United FC (2014–2015)

== In popular culture ==
Shillong Lajong gained popularity worldwide after being featured in a FIFA Futbol Mundial documentary episode titled "Where football is number one in India" by FIFA in August 2013, in which club's history, fanbase and legacy were screened. Another FIFA Futbol Mundial episode was released later on 23 September in the same year, named "A dancing 'hero' in India", which was based on Shillong Lajong's Portuguese striker Edinho Júnior, who signed for the club on loan from then Premier League side Blackburn Rovers. The episode highlighted dancing skills of Júnior in the club jersey, who became an overnight sensation at that time.

In November 2013, the club launched their official mobile application on Android and iOS platforms, thus became the first football club in India to do so.

== See also ==
- List of football clubs in Meghalaya
