= Meghalaya State League =

Indian football league in the state of Meghalaya

- Organising body: Meghalaya Football Association (MFA)
- Founded: 2017; 9 years ago
- Country: India
- Number of clubs: 24
- Level on pyramid: 5
- Promotion to: I-League 3
- Relegation to: District leagues Shillong Premier League
- Current champions: Mawlai SC (1st title)
- Most championships: Niaw Wasa United; Shillong Lajong; Rangdajied United; Mawlai SC; Nongkseh SSCC (1 title each)
- Broadcaster(s): T7 News Channel (YouTube)
- Current: 2026 Meghalaya State League

The Meghalaya State League is the top state-level football league in the Indian state of Meghalaya. It is managed by the Meghalaya Football Association (MFA).

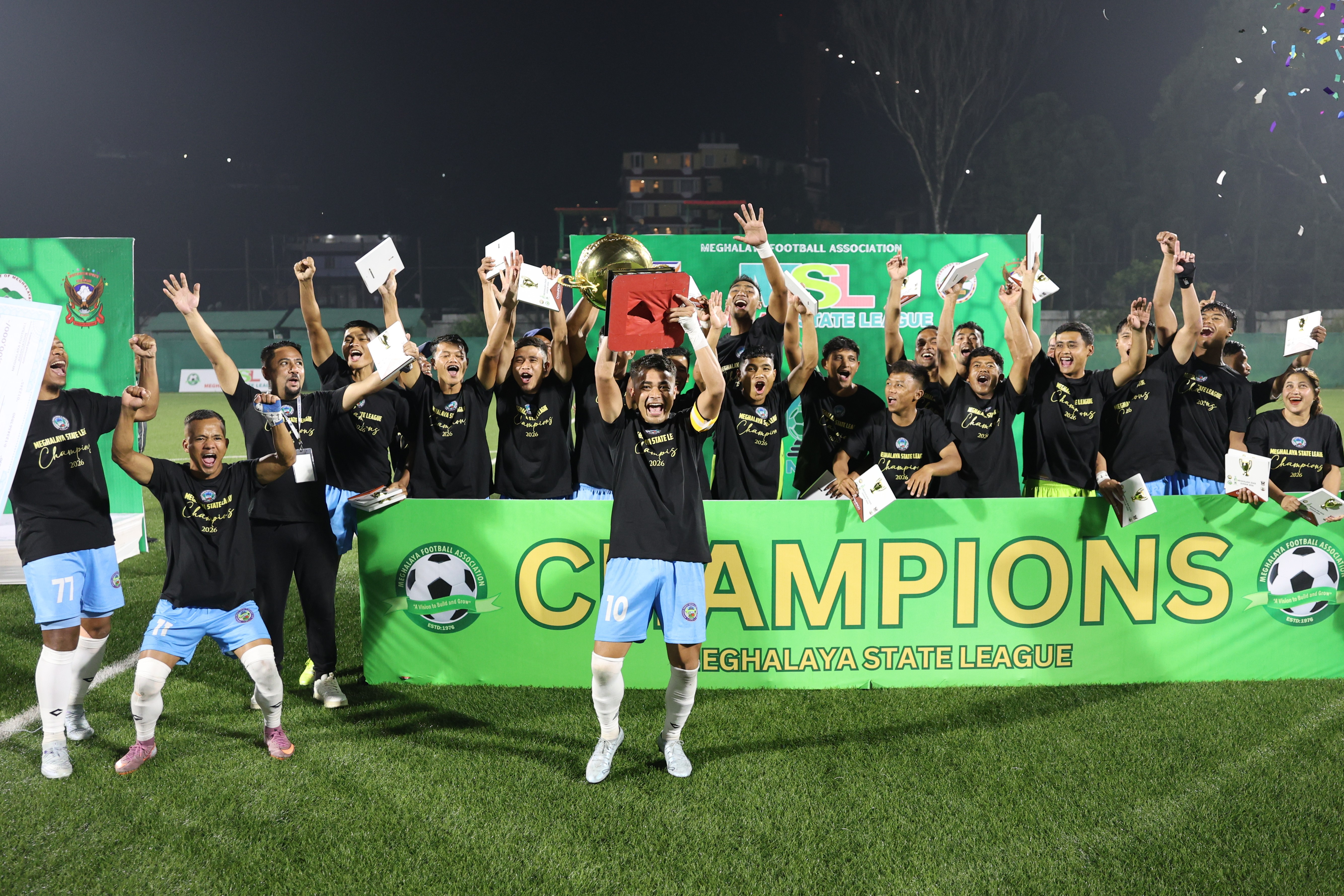
Players and officials of Nongkseh SSCC celebrate winning the 5th Meghalaya State League in June 2026

== History ==
The first edition of the Meghalaya State League was held in 2017, with the competition involving participation for the top clubs of the 21 football leagues which operate in Meghalaya's 11 districts.

== Competition structure ==
Tier	Division
1 _{(5 on Indian football pyramid)}	Meghalaya State League
2 _{(6 on Indian football pyramid)}	District leagues (Shillong Premier League, Tura Super Division Football League and others)

== Format ==
The champions from the district leagues are direct entrants, while the rest go through qualifying rounds. The clubs are placed in groups with four hosts across the state.

== Clubs ==
=== 2026 season ===
The teams participating in the 2026 season:

MSL participants
Group A (Shillong)	Group B (Shillong)	Group C (Amlarem)	Group D (Khliehriat)	Group E (Wahiajer)	Group F (Mairang)	Group G (Williamnagar)	Group H (Mawkyrwat)
Nongkseh SCC	Nangkiew Irat FC	Mawlai SC	Shkenshynriah SC	Shillong Lajong	Langsning	Maram FC	Rangdajied United
Umkaber SCC	Mawphu SC	Laskein SCSC	Thangskai Tiger SC	Iatyllilang Lumsehkot CSC	Lawbah SC	Janepih Youth SCA	Mawlarshong SC
Mawshun SCC	Mawlum Tyrsad SCC	Lamin XI SCC	Jalaphet Moochut Pyrdung SC	Lamyrsiang CSC	Umlakro SC	Achik SCO Rongjeng	Mawten SC
Khimusniang SC	Mulang SC Nongbah	Amlarem SC	Ladthadlaboh SC	Lumphyrnai Sohphoh FC	Mishon SSCC	Balmanduri FC	Seng Samla Umdang Pyllun
—N/a	—N/a	—N/a	—N/a	—N/a	—N/a	Attong Matgrik FC	—N/a

== Champions ==
Season	Champions	Runners-up	Ref
2017–18	Niaw Wasa United	Tynrongmawsaw	
2019	Shillong Lajong	Rangdajied United	
2023	Rangdajied United	Khliehmawlieh YC	
2024	Mawlai SC	Shillong Lajong	
2026	Nongkseh SSCC	Langsning FC	
