= Royal Wahingdoh FC =

Association football club in India

Royal Wahinghdoh
- Full name: Royal Wahingdoh Football Club
- Nickname: The Royals
- Founded: 1946; 80 years ago
- Ground: Jawaharlal Nehru Stadium
- Capacity: 30,000
- Owner: Royal Wahingdoh Sports Club Pvt. Ltd.
- Chairman: Domnic Tariang
- Head coach: Santosh Kashyap
- League: Shillong Premier League
- Website: royalwahingdohfc.com
Home colours	Away colours

Royal Wahingdoh Football Club (also known as Wahingdoh Sports Club) was an Indian professional football club based in Shillong, Meghalaya. Nicknamed "Royals", the club participated in the I-League, then top flight of the Indian football league system. Royal Wahingdoh holds the record for the highest number of consecutive Shillong Premier League titles, having won the finals in December 2010, 2011 and in 2012.

They have also competed in I-League 2nd Division during the 2013–14 season. They won the league by defeating Bhawanipore in the last match of the league and qualified to play for the 2014–15 season of the I-League.

== History ==
=== 1946–2010 ===
Founded in 1946 as Wahingdoh Sports Club, the club based in Shillong won numerous titles. However, with changing times and professionalisation, the amateur club began to face some difficulty competing with younger clubs and it was then, that the decline began.

In 2007, Wahingdoh Sports Club was almost relegated to the 2nd Division League and as a result of inconsistent performance, the Wahingdoh community felt the need for a younger and more innovative approach. In 2008, the club turned professional when it merged with Royal Football Club before being renamed Royal Wahingdoh FC under the leadership of the club's owner Dominic Sutnga Tariang. With the club witnessing several dramatic changes, a new chapter was in the making and in the very same year, the club bounced back to claim third spot in the 2nd Division Regional League, a sign that brought hope for a brighter future. In the First Division 2009 season, they created a record by winning all their games besides scoring 52 goals en route to lifting the title and along with it, an entry into the top tier of Meghalaya football, the Shillong Premier League.

=== 2010–2015 ===
Royal Wahingdoh FC was Shillong's one of the two most popular clubs. In the 2010 season, they lifted the Shillong Premier League – in their debut season. In 2011, Carlton Chapman was appointed as new head coach, and they lifted the trophy in 2011 and 2012. In 2011, the club signed Liberian international Bekay Bewar who helped the side gaining promotion to the I-League, and was retained by the Shillong based side for there season. The same year, they lifted Bordoloi Trophy. In September 2012, the club reached semi-finals of Bordoloi Trophy. In the same year, Royal Wahingdoh took part in Shillong Super Series Football Championship and faced teams like A-League club Wellington Phoenix. In 2012 I-League Second Division final round, the club ended their campaign securing fourth place.

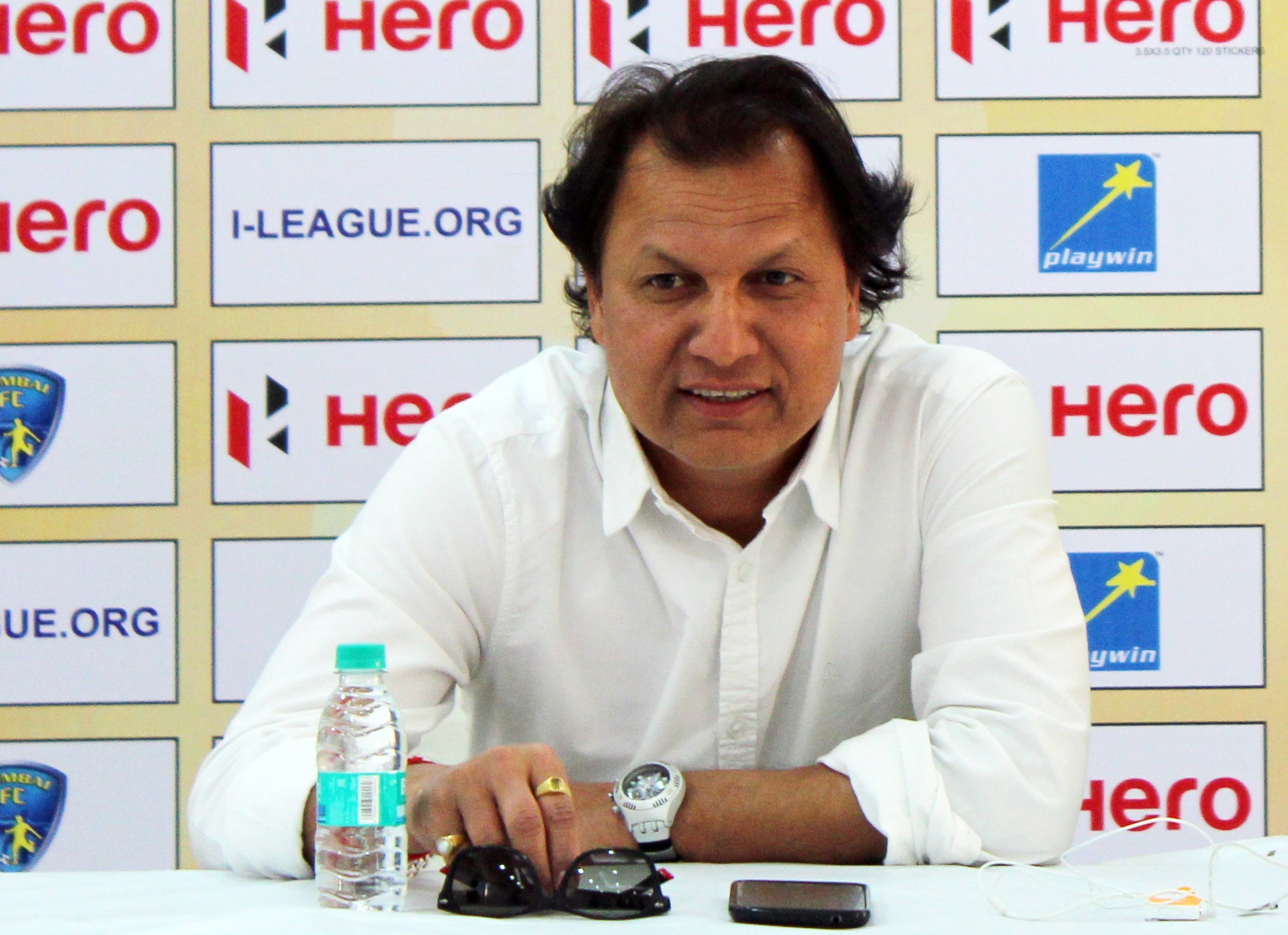
Santosh Kashyap managed Wahingdoh in their debut season of the I-League

In 2014, Royal Wahingdoh achieved their biggest success after winning the I-League 2nd Division, then second tier of indian football league system. They qualified for the 2014 I-League 2nd Division final round and finished on top spot with 18 points in 8 matches after defeating Bhawanipore in the final match. Thus they were declared as the debutants of the 2014–15 I-League season. They have also participated in the 2014 Federation Cup.

Santosh Kashyap was appointed the head coach for newly promoted Royal Wahingdoh before the start of the 2014–15 I-League. They signed Trinidad and Tobago international Densill Theobald as marquee player, who represented his nation at the 2006 FIFA World Cup. The club also appeared in the 2014–15 Federation Cup and defeated Mumbai 2–1 in the tournament opener. They lost 2–1, narrowly, to Sporting Goa on 4 January 2015. Royal Wahingdoh began their regular league season on 18 January in a match against Shillong Lajong, which was the first ever Shillong Derby in the I-league, in their 2–1 win, before facing Salgaocar next. They later drew 1–1 with Kalyani Bharat on 21 March 2015. they later defeated Pune in a 2–0 win in Shillong on 29 March 2015. The club then also defeated East Bengal on 31 March 2015, by 1–0. On 3 May, club's striker Jackichand Singh assisted teammate Satiyasen Singh thrice the hat-trick against Salgaocar in their 4–2 win. At the end of the 2014–15 season, Jackichand Singh was awarded best player of the season award. Under his coaching, Royal Wahingdoh stun eventual champions Mohun Bagan by 3–2 margin, and ended the season in third position with 30 points in 20 league matches.

== Disfunction ==
After finishing third in the top tier domestic league, Royal Wahingdoh pulled out of I-League and Santosh Kashyap left the club. Though the club was granted a national license to compete in 2015–16 I-League, they decided to pull out, citing lack of a clear roadmap for the league as the reason.

For Wahingdoh, which operated on a budget of ₹ 6–7 crore in their only I-League season, it was about making a tough choice. Instead of pumping in more money for playing in a league where they got no recognition and no visibility, they chose to put the same money into building infrastructure and scouting for more talent.

== Stadiums ==
Royal Wahingdoh used the Jawaharlal Nehru Stadium in Shillong as their home ground for games in Shillong Premier League. They have also used this venue for the games of the older editions of the I-League. With artificial turf, the stadium has a seating capacity of 30,000 spectators.

== Rivalries ==
=== Shillong derby ===
- Royal Wahingdoh had a rivalry with local side Shillong Lajong FC in both the I-League and Shillong Premier League.

Shillong Lajong vs Royal Wahingdoh (Shillong Derby)

Competition	Shillong Lajong wins	Draw	Royal Wahingdoh wins
I-League	0	1	1
Federation Cup	1	0	0
Shillong Premier League	1	0	0
Total	2	1	1

== Kit manufacturers and shirt sponsors ==
Period	Kit manufacturer	Shirt sponsor
2006–2015	Uhlsport	Imperial Blue

== Seasons ==
=== 2011 season ===
In 2011, it was announced that Royal Wahingdoh FC would join the newly re-done I-League 2nd Division. The club appointed UEFA Pro Licence holder German manager Volker Hofferbert as their head coach, while Carlton Chapman and newly appointed coach from Manipur, Nandakumar Singh have been assigned the roles of assistant coaches. They won their opening match 3–1. They won their second match against Chandini FC 3–0. They won the third match 2–1 and fourth match 3–1 against Vasco. They won their fifth match in row against Eagles FC 3–2. Currently they have the longest winning streak in 2011 I-League 2nd Division. They won all their matches in Group C and qualified to 2011 I-League 2nd Division final round. Royal started their final round in by losing two and drawing one out of the 3 games played. After six rounds in final round, they won one match and lost 3 of them and are in 5th position with 5 points.

Royal Wahingdoh have also entered into the 2011 Federation Cup, topping the group during the qualifying round with wins in all their matches and faced Mohan Bagan in their first match. RWFC beat Mohun Bagan 2–1 courtesy a brace from Chenco. This was followed by a 2–1 win over Churchill Brothers FC. However, the Royals lost to local rivals Shillong Lajong FC in the final group match and though both Shillong teams ended up with 6 points, it was Lajong that progressed on the head-to-head rule.

=== 2012 season ===
Royal Wahingdoh qualified for the final round of the 2012 I-league 2nd Division. During the preliminary phase, they won 5 matches and drew 2 of their games. In the final round, the team fielded four foreigners against ONGC F.C. which the club claimed was an 'honest' blunder. According to AIFF rules, no side can field more than three foreigners at a time. They won the match 4–1, but the game was eventually awarded 3–0 to ONGC.

The 'Royals', as they are fondly referred to by fans, secured their third successive Shillong Premier League title, which is a new record. The final was won 3–1 against Rangdajied United who fielded their first side including Babatunde, Jeribe, Enyinnaya and Argha. In the match, the scores were locked at 1–1 after regulation time with Beekay being RWFC's lone goal scorer. Babatunde headed in an equaliser in the second half to put his side in contention. However, it was the extra time goals by Chencho and Milancy that did it for the 'Royals' and in the process, hand them their third successive finals win.

=== 2014 season ===
Royal Wahingdoh won 2014 I-League 2nd Division and will be promoted to 2014–15 I-League. The club has also appointed Santosh Kashyap as their Manager for the upcoming I-League season. In the same year, its youth side went on a trip to South Africa.

=== 2014–15 season ===
Royal finished a 3rd in the I-league. India football team players like Jackichand Singh, Reagan Singh, Satiyasen Singh appeared with Wahingdoh.

=== 2015–16 season ===
Though the club was granted national license to compete in 2015–16 I-League, they decided to pull out, citing lack of clear roadmap for the league as the reason. The club had earlier failed to comply with AFC licensing criteria as their home stadium did not adhere to the credentials. The club continues to participate in other tournaments; State League and the AIFF organised youth league tournaments (U-15 & U-18 leagues).

== Former players ==
For all former notable players of Royal Wahingdoh with Wikipedia articles, see: Royal Wahingdoh FC players.

=== Foreign players ===
- (Japan) Atsushi Yonezawa (2013–2014)
- (Nigeria) Badmus Babatunde (2012–2013)
- (Nepal) Asim Jung Karki (2013–2014)
- (Liberia) Perry Kollie (2011–2012)
- (Brazil) Edmilson Marques Pardal (2011–2012)
- (Liberia) Bekay Bewar (2011–2014)
- (Nigeria) Loveday Enyinnaya (2014–2015)
- (Bhutan) Chencho Nio (2011–2012)
- (Bhutan) Chencho Dorji (2011–2012)
- (Trinidad and Tobago) Densill Theobald (2014–2015)
- (Nigeria) Kareem Omolaja (2011–2013)
- (North Korea) Kim Song-yong (2014–2015)
- (Nigeria) Echezona Anyichie (2014–2016)

== Managerial history ==
Note: The following list may not be complete

- (India) Carlton Chapman (2009–2012)
- (Germany) Volker Hofferbert (2012–2013)
- (India) Nandakumar Singh (2013–2014)
- (India) Santosh Kashyap (2014–2015)

== Honours ==
=== League ===
- I-League
  - Third place (1): 2014–15
- I-League 2nd Division
  - Champions (1): 2014
- Shillong Premier League
  - Champions (3): 2010, 2011, 2012
  - Runners-up (3): 2011, 2013, 2015
- Shillong First Division League
  - Champions: 2009
- Meghalaya Third Division League
  - Third place (1): 2008

=== Cup ===
- Bordoloi Trophy
  - Champions (1): 2011
- Sati Raja Trophy
  - Champions (1): 2011
- All India Steel Express Trophy
  - Runners-up (1): 2011
- All-India Independence Day Cup
  - Runners-up (1): 2010
- Mizoram Independence Day Cup
  - Runners-up (1): 2011

== Club records ==
Overall records

- Undefeated league campaign in the Shillong First Division League – 2009; set a record by winning all their games besides scoring 52 goals to lift the title.
- First team to win the Shillong Premier League title on debut: 2010
- Best player of the I-League: (India) Jackichand Singh (with Royal Wahingdoh) – 2014–15 season.

== Other departments ==
=== Youth team and academy ===
Royal Wahingdoh operated several youth teams, which competed in U15 and U17 Youth I-League tournaments. They also participated and won the title of Meghalaya U-14 Championship under guidance of head of youth development, Bobby Nongbet, in which Rheadolf Nongneng emerged as top scorer with 16 goals. In the 2016–17 season of Nike Premier Cup, Royal Wahingdoh finished as runners up, losing to Minerva Punjab.

In 2014, youth team (under-17) of Royal Wahingdoh toured to South Africa to participate in the sixth edition of Future Champions Gauteng International Tournament in Soweto, in which they were placed in group D with English club Sunderland, American side USYSA and local team Mamelodi Sundowns. In that tournament, the club defeated Chinese outfit Shandong Luneng Taishan. U19 team of the club competed in U19 Shillong Premier League.

Honours

- Meghalaya U-14 Championship
  - Champions (1): 2014–15
- Nike Premier Cup
  - Runners-up (1): 2016–17

=== Royal Wahingdoh women's ===
In 2014, the club launched its women's football section. On 17 August 2015, they clinched Independence Day Cup title, beating Sanbhalang FC 8–1 in the final at Jawaharlal Nehru Stadium, which was organized by Meghalaya Football Players' Association. In 2016, the team coached by Iaikyntiew Marbaniang, took part in preliminary round of the Indian Women's League held in Cuttack, Odisha. Thus the club became first and only team from Meghalaya to feature in the IWL; they later received invitation from Shillong Sports Association to play in the inaugural state women's football league in the East Khasi Hills.

Honours

- Meghalaya Women's Independence Day Cup
  - Champions (1): 2015

== Affiliated club(s) ==
The following club was affiliated with Royal Wahingdoh

- (India) Shillong United (2011–2017)

== See also ==
- List of football clubs in Meghalaya
- Northeast Derby (India)
