= Langsning SC =

Indian association football club

Langsning
- Full name: Langsning Football Club
- Short name: LFC; LSC
- Founded: 1954; 72 years ago
- Ground: Jawaharlal Nehru Stadium
- Capacity: 30,000
- President: Banteidor Lyngdoh
- Head coach: Khlain P. Syiemlieh
- League: Shillong Premier League; Meghalaya State League
Home colours	Away colours

Langsning Football Club (also known as Langsning Sports Club) is an Indian professional football club based in Shillong, Meghalaya. The club competes in the Shillong Premier League (SPL) and has previously competed in the I-League 2, then second tier of football in India.

== History ==
Founded in 1954, Langsning FC is a Khasi football club; the name is taken from one locality in Shillong known as Jaiaw Langsning, and most of the players came from this or neighboring localities. The club won the Shillong Premier League in 2017. Langsning FC had played in the 2011, 2012 and 2013 seasons of I-League 2nd Division. The club failed to advance beyond group stage in 2011 and 2012. Langsning FC's best performance so far came in 2013, where they finished fourth. After four years, Langsning FC competed again in 2017–18 I-League 2nd Division.

== Team records ==
=== Seasons ===
As of 15 May 2018

Year	Division	League								Federation Cup
Year	Division	Pos.	P	W	D	L	GF	GA	Pts	Federation Cup
2011	I-League 2nd Division	Group stage	6	3	1	2	11	7	10	—
2012	I-League 2nd Division	Group stage	7	4	1	2	10	8	13	—
2013	I-League 2nd Division	4th	18	9	6	3	40	22	33	—
2017–18	I-League 2nd Division	Group stage	10	4	3	3	16	9	15	—

== Honours ==
=== League ===
- Shillong Premier League
  - Champions (3): 2017, 2018, 2025
  - Runners-up (1): 2014
- Shillong First Division League
  - Champions (4): 1997, 1999, 2000, 2005

=== Cup ===
- Bordoloi Trophy
  - Runners-up (1): 2011
- Independence Day Cup
  - Champions (1): 2012

== See also ==
- Northeast Derby (India)
