= Jawaharlal Nehru Stadium (Shillong) =

Football stadium in Meghalaya, India

- Polo Ground
- Interactive map of Jawaharlal Nehru Stadium
- Full name: Jawaharlal Nehru Stadium
- Address: HVJV+2JW, Polo-Lawmali, Golf Links; Shillong, Meghalaya; India
- Location: Shillong, Meghalaya, India
- Coordinates: 25.579995°N 91.894326°E
- Owner: Shillong Lajong Pvt. Ltd.
- Operator: Shillong Lajong
- Capacity: 15,100
- Surface: Grass
- Field size: 103.0 x 67.0 m

Construction
- Opened: 1975
- Renovated: 2011–2023
- Cost: ₹53 Crore INR
- Builders: Badri Rai and Company

Tenants
- Meghalaya football team Shillong Lajong; NorthEast United (selected matches); India national football team (selected matches)

Jawaharlal Nehru Stadium, locally known as Polo Ground, is a football stadium in Shillong, in the Indian state of Meghalaya. It has most notably hosted the home matches of Shillong Lajong in the I-League. The stadium has a seating capacity of 15,100, following major renovations.

The stadium has recently been used by Indian Super League side Northeast United for some of their home matches during the 2024–25 season. The match ended in a 0–0 draw.

== History ==
The stadium is a two tier stadium with a roof over the main stand. Astroturf was installed in 2012. The stadium predominantly hosted I-League and Shillong Premier League matches. Before professional football was played in Shillong, the stadium was created for football and running use. Both sports were played at an amateur level.

In 2009 the football club known as Shillong Lajong gained promotion to the top-tier of Indian football I-League and as a result started using the Nehru Stadium as there ground. The team regularly drew 30,000 fans for the games.

After relegation the stadium was again used for Lajong games in the I-League 2nd Division for the 2011 Season Final Round. The home field advantage managed to give Lajong promotion back to the I-League and back into fully professional football.

After the 2011 I-League 2nd Division it was announced that a change needed to be done to the pitch at the Nehru Stadium. When the stadium hosted the 2011 2nd Division it drew criticism for how the pitch was very unprepared, it even drew criticism from Indian Football Captain Baichung Bhutia. On 17 August 2011, it was officially announced that the Meghalaya Government had officially given ₹555,000,000 for the stadium renovation and it was commenced. Due to this Lajong had to move to another stadium for there 2011–12 I-League matches.

After receiving major upgrades and expansion, the AFC decided it would be fit to host the match between India and Bangladesh in the 2027 AFC Asian Cup Qualifiers. This would mark the first time a competitive international match was played here.

== Tournaments Hosted ==
  - Shillong Premier League (sixth tier of Indian football)
  - Meghalaya State League (fifth tier of Indian football)
  - SSA Women's Football League
  - Indian Super League (first tier of Indian football; Northeast United selected matches)
  - I-League (second tier of Indian football)
  - I-League 2 (third tier of Indian football)
  - Durand Cup
  - 2027 AFC Asian Cup Qualification (selected matches)
