= 2018–19 Aizawl FC season =

Indian football club season

Aizawl
2018-19 season
- Chairman: Robert Romawia Royte
- Manager: Gift Raikhan (until 7 January); Stanley Rozario (from 9 February)
- Stadium: Rajiv Gandhi Stadium
- Mizoram Premier League: Winners
- I-League: 7th
- Super Cup: Withdrew
Home colours	Away colours

The 2018–19 season is Aizawl's 35th competitive season and its fourth competitive season in the I-League, India's top flight professional football league. The season covers the period from 1 June 2018 to 31 May 2019.

== Squad information ==
=== Current squad ===
As of 29 December 2018

Note: Flags indicate national team as defined under FIFA eligibility rules; some limited exceptions apply. Players may hold more than one non-FIFA nationality.

No.	Pos.	Nation	Player
1	GK	IND	Lalremruata Arema
22	GK	IND	Gurpreet Singh
44	GK	IND	Lalawmpuia (Opa)
2	DF	IND	Govin Singh
3	DF	IND	Lal Biakzuala
4	DF	IND	S.R. Lallawmawma
5	DF	IND	Lalrinchhana Tochhawng (Rinchhana)
14	DF	IND	Joe Zoherliana
16	DF	NGA	Kareem Omolaja
19	DF	IND	Lalchhuanawma Varte (Chhuantea)
24	DF	IND	C. Lalrosanga
25	DF	IND	Lalram Hmunmawia (Tea)
26	DF	UGA	Richard Kasagga
27	DF	IND	Lalhriatrenga (Achia)
31	DF	IND	Hmingthanmawia (Valpuia)
33	DF	IND	Vanlalthanga
37	DF	IND	Vanlalduatsanga (Duata)
6	MF	KGZ	Bektur Talgat Uulu

No.	Pos.	Nation	Player
7	MF	IND	Rochharzela (Chhara)
8	MF	IND	Paul Ramfangzauva
11	MF	IND	Albert Zohmingmawia
12	MF	IND	Isak Vanlalruatfela
17	MF	IND	David Lalrinmuana
18	MF	IND	David Lalbiakzara
20	MF	LBR	Alfred Jaryan
21	MF	IND	Lalhmangaihkima (H. Kima)
23	MF	IND	Lalrin Fela
34	MF	IND	Lalrinchhana
—	MF	IND	H. Lalbiakthanga (B.Tea)
9	FW	IND	Lalkhawpuimawia (Mapuia)
10	FW	CIV	Léonce Dodoz Zikahi
29	FW	IND	F. Lalremsanga
30	FW	LBR	Ansumana Kromah
—	FW	IND	Jonathan Lalrawngbawla (Jojo)
—	FW	IND	Jesse Laldinpuia
—	FW	IND	Lalruatfela Zote

== Kit ==
Supplier: Vamos / Sponsor: NE Consultancy Services

Home	Away	Goalkeeper

== Competitions ==
=== Overview ===
Competition	First match	Last match	Starting round	Final position	Record							
Competition	First match	Last match	Starting round	Final position	Pld	W	D	L	GF	GA	GD	Win %
Mizoram Premier League	7 September 2018	17 December 2018	Matchday 1	Winners	17	9	6	2	35	20	+15	52.94
I-League	28 October 2018	9 March 2019	Matchday 1	7th	20	6	6	8	27	28	−1	30.00
Super Cup	16 March 2019	16 March 2019	Qualification Round	Qualification Round	0	0	0	0	0	0	+0	—
Total					37	15	12	10	62	48	+14	40.54

Source: Competitions

=== Mizoram Premier League ===
The Mizoram Premier League fixtures were announced on 31 August 2018.

==== League table ====
Pos	Team	Pld	W	D	L	GF	GA	GD	Pts	Qualification or relegation
1	Chhinga Veng	14	10	3	1	21	6	+15	33	Advance to Semi-finals
2	Aizawl	14	7	5	2	25	12	+13	26	Advance to Semi-finals
3	Mizoram Police F.C.	14	7	0	7	22	16	+6	21	Advance to Semi-finals
4	Chanmari	14	6	3	5	17	17	0	21	Advance to Semi-finals
5	Electric Veng FC	14	6	2	6	16	17	−1	20	

Updated to match(es) played on 19 November 2018. Source: Mizoram Premier League 2018-19
Rules for classification: 1) Points; 2) Goal difference; 3) Goals scored

==== Results by match ====
Round	1	2	3	4	5	6	7	8	9	10	11	12	13	14
Ground	A	H	A	H	A	H	A	A	H	H	H	H	A	A
Result	L	D	W	D	W	D	W	D	W	W	W	W	L	D
Position	5	5	4	5	3	4	3	3	3	2	2	2	2	2

Source: Fixtures
A = Away; H = Home; W = Win; D = Draw; L = Loss

==== Knockout stage ====
Semi-Finals
1	Chhinga Veng	1	1	2
4	Chanmari	0	0	0
2	Aizawl	2	2	4
3	Mizoram Police	1	2	3

Finals
1	Chhinga Veng	1 (4)
2	Aizawl	1 (5)

==== Matches ====
Win Draw Loss

7 September 2018 1	Electric Veng	2–1	Aizawl	Aizawl
14:00 IST	Vanlalpeka 71'; Jaryan 80' (o.g.)	Report	Jaryan 69'	Stadium: Lammual

13 September 2018 2	Aizawl	2–2	Chanmari	Aizawl
15:00 IST	Lalremsanga 6'; Vanlalruatfela 39'	Report	Lalrosanga 14' (red card) 73'; Lalnunzama 69'	Stadium: Lammual; Man of the Match: Vanlalruatfela (Aizawl)

21 September 2018 3	Mizoram Police FC	1–3	Aizawl	Aizawl
19:00 IST	Lalramtharmawia 59' (pen.)	Report	Jaryan 9', 52'; Lalrinfela 85'	Stadium: Lammual

26 September 2018 4	Aizawl	0–0	Chhinga Veng	Aizawl
19:00 IST		Report		Stadium: Lammual

28 September 2018 5	Ramhlun North	0–2	Aizawl	Aizawl
19:00 IST		Report	Lalremsanga 10'; Rochharzela 42'	Stadium: Lammual

5 October 2018 6	Aizawl	2–2	Chawnpui	Aizawl
19:00 IST	Lalremsanga 21'; Lalkhawpuimawia 49'; Hmingthanmawia (red card) 83'	Report	Laltlansanga 25'; Vanlalthanga 45+3'	Stadium: Lammual

12 October 2018 7	Bethlehem VT	1–4	Aizawl	Aizawl
11:30 IST	Hruaia 49'	Report	Lalremsanga 8'; Kromah 43' (pen.); Lalrinfela 53'; Lalkhawpuimawia 90'	Stadium: Lammual; Man of the Match: Lalrinfela

17 October 2018 8	Chawnpui	1–1	Aizawl	Aizawl
17:30 IST	Vanrammawwia 44'	Report	Lalthlamuana 90+2' (o.g.)	Stadium: Lammual

25 October 2018 9	Aizawl	1–0	Bethlehem VT	Aizawl
19:00 IST	Lalhmangaihkima 22'	Report		Stadium: Lammual

30 October 2018 10	Aizawl	4–0	Ramhlun North	Aizawl
15:00 IST	Zohmingmawia 31'; Rochharzela 48'; Lalhriatrenga 54'; Zote 82'	Report		Stadium: Lammual

8 November 2018 11	Aizawl	2–0	Electric Veng	Aizawl
19:00 IST	Lalhmangaihkima 55'; Lalremsanga 86'	[goalie365.com/fixture_details.php?match_id=2634/Mizoram%20Premier%20League%207/Aizawl%20vs%20Electric Report]		Stadium: Lammual

13 November 2018 12	Aizawl	2–1	Mizoram Police FC	Aizawl
14:30 IST	Vanlalruatfela 45+1'; Lalkhawpuimawia 83'	Report	Malsawmfela 51'	Stadium: Lammual

17 November 2018 13	Chanmari	1–0	Aizawl	Aizawl
20:00 IST	Laldampuia 85'	Report		Stadium: Lammual

19 November 2018 14	Chhinga Veng	1–1	Aizawl	Aizawl
14:00 IST	Diomande 72'	Report	Zote 49'	Stadium: Lammual

Semi–finals

26 November 2018 Leg–1	Aizawl	2–1	Mizoram Police FC	Aizawl
19:00 IST	Uulu 28'; Jaryan 90+3'	Report	Lalfakzuala 84'	Stadium: Lammual

1 December 2018 Leg–2	Mizoram Police FC	2–2	Aizawl	Aizawl
19:30 IST	Lalfakzuala 9'; Malsawmtluanga 54'	Report	Rochharzela 16'; Lalhmangaihkima 28'	Stadium: Lammual

Final

17 December 2018 Final	Chhinga Veng	1–1 (4–5 p)	Aizawl	Aizawl
19:00 IST	Lalromawia 73'	Report	Jaryan 39'	Stadium: Lammual
	Penalties
	(penalty scored) Dawngliana; (penalty scored) Lalmuansanga; (penalty scored) Lalromawia; (penalty scored) Sanga; (penalty missed) Lalrinchhana; (penalty missed) Hmingthanmawia		(penalty scored) Rochharzela; (penalty missed) Ramfangzauva; (penalty scored) Jaryan; (penalty scored) Zote; (penalty scored) Kromah; (penalty scored) Tochhawng

=== I–League ===
The I-League fixtures were announced on 5 October 2018.

==== League table ====
Pos	Team	Pld	W	D	L	GF	GA	GD	Pts
5	Mohun Bagan	20	8	5	7	27	28	−1	29
6	NEROCA	20	7	5	8	27	26	+1	26
7	Aizawl	20	6	6	8	27	28	−1	24
8	Indian Arrows	20	6	3	11	19	28	−9	21
9	Minerva Punjab	20	4	6	10	10	19	−9	18 (Note: The game between Minerva Punjab and Real Kashmir was rescheduled, but eventually it was not played and both teams were awarded a point.)

Source: I-league
Rules for classification: 1) points; 2) head-to-head points; 3) head-to-head goal difference; 4) goal difference; 5) number of goals scored; 6) drawing of lots

==== Results by match ====
Round	1	2	3	4	5	6	7	8	9	10	11	12	13	14	15	16	17	18	19	20
Ground	A	A	H	H	H	H	A	A	A	H	H	H	A	A	A	H	A	A	H	H
Result	L	D	D	L	L	W	L	L	D	W	L	D	L	D	W	L	D	W	W	W
Position	9	8	10	11	11	8	9	9	9	9	10	10	10	10	7	8	9	7	7	7

Source: Fixtures
A = Away; H = Home; W = Win; D = Draw; L = Loss

==== Matches ====
Win Draw Loss

28 October 2018 1	Shillong Lajong	2–1	Aizawl	Shillong
17:00 IST	Dohling (yellow card) 19'; Mahesh 20', 53'	Report	Kromah 70' (pen.); Hmingthanmawia (yellow card) 90+4'	Stadium: Jawaharlal Nehru Stadium; Attendance: 14,697; Referee: Tanmoy Dhar; Man of the Match: Mahesh (Shillong Lajong)

3 November 2018 2	Mohun Bagan	2–2	Aizawl	Kolkata
17:00 IST	Kisseka (yellow card) 15'; Lalchhawnkima 43'; Norde 69'	Report	Uulu (yellow card) 22'; Lalkhawpuimawia 29'; Jaryan (yellow card) 31'; Lalrinmuana 90+3'	Stadium: Salt Lake Stadium; Attendance: 18,785; Referee: Priyobarta Singh Langpoklakpam; Man of the Match: Norde (Mohun Bagan)

7 November 2018 3	Aizawl	0–0	NEROCA	Aizawl
14:00 IST	Uulu (yellow card) 50'	Report	Kallon (yellow card) 8'; Thangmuansang (yellow card) 89'; Tondomba (yellow card) 90+3'	Stadium: Rajiv Gandhi Stadium; Attendance: 4,592; Referee: Santosh Kumar; Man of the Match: Meitei (NEROCA)

10 November 2018 4	Aizawl	1–2	Minerva Punjab	Aizawl
14:00 IST	Singh (yellow card) 29'; Omolaja (yellow card) 63'; Dodoz 84' (pen.)	Report	Touré 10', 59' (yellow card) 55'; Dahir (yellow card) 36'	Stadium: Rajiv Gandhi Stadium; Attendance: 3,871; Referee: Raktim Saha; Man of the Match: Touré (Minerva Punjab)

16 November 2018 5	Aizawl	1–2	Chennai City	Aizawl
14:00 IST	Singh (yellow card) 62'; Kromah 72'	Report	Eslava (yellow card) 20'; Gordillo (yellow card) 20'; Kumar (yellow card) 23'; Rodríguez 49', 77' (yellow card) 78'	Stadium: Rajiv Gandhi Stadium; Attendance: 1,690; Referee: Tanmoy Dhar; Man of the Match: Thaufiq (Chennai City)

24 November 2018 6	Aizawl	3–2	East Bengal	Aizawl
14:00 IST	Dodoz 25'; Lalrinmuana (yellow card) 33'; Zohmingmawia (yellow card) 36'; Zoherliana 74'; Lalbiakzara (yellow card) 79'; Lalkhawpuimawia 84'	Report	Ralte (yellow card) 13'; Esqueda (yellow card) 33'; Jobi 64'; Borja 70'	Stadium: Rajiv Gandhi Stadium; Attendance: 3,612; Referee: Rosario Fernandes; Man of the Match: Dodoz (Aizawl)

5 December 2018 7	Real Kashmir	1–0	Aizawl	Srinagar
14:00 IST	Armand 30'; Krizo (yellow card) 70'; Enyinnaya (yellow card) 76'	Report	Hmingthanmawia (yellow card) 29'; Omolaja (yellow card) 82'	Stadium: TRC Turf Ground; Attendance: 12,000; Referee: Tejas Visvasrao Nagvenkar; Man of the Match: Armand (Real Kashmir)

9 December 2018 8	Churchill Brothers	4–1	Aizawl	Vasco da Gama
17:00 IST	Aucho 23'; Gurung 24'; Wolfe 61'; Ceesay (yellow card) 74'; Novakovic (yellow card) 75'; Plaza 77'; Vaz (yellow card) 90+3'	Report	Vanlalduatsanga (yellow card) 32'; Hmunmawia (yellow card) 43'; Kromah 54'; Lalrinfela (yellow card) 59'; Omolaja (yellow card) 65'	Stadium: Tilak Maidan Stadium; Attendance: 2,911; Referee: R Palmson Moses Raj; Man of the Match: Gurung (Churchill Brothers)

14 December 2018 9	Indian Arrows	0–0	Aizawl	Cuttack
17:00 IST	Ali (yellow card) 73'	Report	Vanlalduatsanga (yellow card) 7'; Omolaja (yellow card) 89'	Stadium: Barabati Stadium; Attendance: 3,122; Referee: Mithun Kumar Kundu; Man of the Match: Kiyam (Indian Arrows)

29 December 2018 10	Aizawl	3–2	Gokulam Kerala	Aizawl
14:00 IST	Kromah 51'; Lalkhawpuimawia 63'; Rochharzela 70'	Report	Ortiz (yellow card) 24'; Singh (yellow card) 28'; Kunniyil (yellow card) 53'; Sunday 90+3', 90+4' (pen.)	Stadium: Rajiv Gandhi Stadium; Attendance: 5,324; Referee: Raktim Saha; Man of the Match: Jaryan (Aizawl)

5 January 2019 11	Aizawl	0–1	Indian Arrows	Aizawl
14:00 IST	Vanlalruatfela (yellow card) 43'	Report	Danu 14'	Stadium: Rajiv Gandhi Stadium; Attendance: 863; Referee: Ibungo Meetei Ningthoukhongjam; Man of the Match: Ali (Indian Arrows)

11 January 2019 12	Aizawl	0–0	Real Kashmir	Aizawl
14:00 IST		Report	Ravanan (yellow card) 25'; Thapa (yellow card) 90+1'	Stadium: Rajiv Gandhi Stadium; Attendance: 1,235; Referee: Pratik Mondal; Man of the Match: Jaryan (Aizawl)

18 January 2019 13	Chennai City	4–3	Aizawl	Coimbatore
19:30 IST	Rodríguez 28', 69'; Kapláň (yellow card) 34'; Manzi 60', 80'	Report	Zohmingmawia 37'; Singh (yellow card) 68'; Vanlalruatfela 90+1'; Lalkhawpuimawia 90+2'	Stadium: Jawaharlal Nehru Stadium; Attendance: 6,876; Referee: Maria Joseph Arokia; Man of the Match: Rodríguez (Chennai City)

27 January 2019 14	NEROCA	0–0	Aizawl	Imphal
14:00 IST	Ferreira (red card) 48'; Thangmuansang (yellow card) 50'; Williams (yellow card) 52'; Yusa (yellow card) 90+1'	Report	Omolaja (yellow card) 19'; Hmingthanmawia (yellow card) 70'	Stadium: Khuman Lampak Main Stadium; Attendance: 12,765; Referee: Pratik Mondal; Man of the Match: Meitei (NEROCA)

1 February 2019 15	Minerva Punjab	0–1	Aizawl	Panchkula
14:00 IST		Report	Lalrinchhana 90+3'	Stadium: Tau Devi Lal Stadium; Attendance: 7,830; Referee: Maria Joseph Arokia; Man of the Match: Lalrinchhana (Aizawl)

16 February 2019 16	Aizawl	1–2	Mohun Bagan	Aizawl
14:00 IST	Kromah 38'; Dodoz (yellow card) 74'; Singh (yellow card) 77'	Report	Kumar (yellow card) 12'; Kisseka 22'; Singh 78'; Ruidas (yellow card) 90+4'	Stadium: Rajiv Gandhi Stadium; Attendance: 4,832; Referee: Rahul Kumar Gupta; Man of the Match: Kisseka (Mohun Bagan)

25 February 2019 17	East Bengal	1–1	Aizawl	Kolkata
17:00 IST	Esqueda 65'; Borja (yellow card) 70'	Report	Dodoz 23'; Kromah (yellow card) 45'; Omolaja (red card) 70'	Stadium: Salt Lake Stadium; Attendance: 17,204; Referee: Umesh Bora; Man of the Match: Dodoz (Aizawl)

28 February 2019 18	Gokulam Kerala	1–3	Aizawl	Kozhikode
17:00 IST	Marcus Joseph 9'	Report	Ramfangzauva 83'; Lalkhawpuimawia 88'; Ansumana Kromah 90+6'	Stadium: EMS Stadium; Attendance: 3,282; Referee: Williams Joy Koshy; Man of the Match: Lalkhawpuimawia (Aizawl)

2 March 2019 19	Aizawl	4–1	Shillong Lajong	Aizawl
14:00 IST	Kromah 40', 83'; Ramfangzauva (yellow card) 75'; Lalkhawpuimawia 81'; Vanlalruatfela 89'	Report	Lyngdoh 90+3'	Stadium: Rajiv Gandhi Stadium; Attendance: 1,020; Referee: Ibungo Meetei Ningthoukhongjam; Man of the Match: Ramfangzauva (Aizawl)

9 March 2019 20	Aizawl	2–1	Churchill Brothers	Aizawl
14:00 IST	Singh (yellow card) 14'; Kassaga (yellow card) 31'; Eldor 43' (o.g.); Kromah 87'	Report	Plaza 5'; Novakovic (yellow card) 44'; Fernandez (yellow card) 48'; Bhutia (yellow card) 87'	Stadium: Rajiv Gandhi Stadium; Attendance: 1,762; Referee: Ajitkumar Meitei Lairenlakpam; Man of the Match: Lalawmpuia (Aizawl)

=== Super Cup ===
The Super Cup venue and fixtures were announced on 5 February 2019 with all matches to be played at Kalinga Stadium in Bhubaneswar. By the virtue of finishing outside top-6, the Aizawl had to play a qualification round in the Super Cup. Before the qualification round, seven I-League clubs including the Aizawl announced they will withdraw from the Super Cup, citing "unfair treatment to I-League clubs." They boycotted the qualifying round which resulted in walkover for the Chennaiyin to the main tournament.

==== Matches ====
Win Draw Loss

16 March 2019 Qualification Round	Chennaiyin	w/o	Aizawl	Bhubaneswar
20:30 IST				Stadium: Kalinga Stadium

== Awards ==
=== Player ===
No.	Player	Award	Tournament	Source
7	(Liberia) Alfred Jaryan	Best Player of the Tournament	Mizoram Premier League	

== See also ==
- 2018–19 in Indian football
- 2018–19 I-League
