= 2020–21 Aizawl FC season =

Indian football club season

Aizawl
2020–21 season
- Chairman: Robert Romawia Royte
- Manager: Stanley Rozario
- Stadium: Rajiv Gandhi Stadium
- I-League: TBD
- Mizoram Premier League: TBD
- Indian Super Cup: TBD
Home colours	Away colours

The 2020–21 season is Aizawl's 37th competitive season and its fourth competitive season in the I-League, India's top-flight professional football league. The season covers the period from 1 June 2020 to 31 May 2021.

== Overview ==
=== August ===
In August 2020, Aizawl FC announced the signing of three midfielders- David Laltlansanga, Vanlalnghenga, and Thasiama. They retained Both Alfred Jaryan and Richard Kasagga for the upcoming season. On 27 August they signed center back Vanlalzuidika from Chhinga Veng F.C. and on 30 August they signed another defender K.Lalmalsawma from their Mizoram Premier League rivals Electric Veng FC. On 31 August they announced the contract extension of T. Mawia for another season.

=== September ===
On 9 and 13 September, they announced the signing of defender PC Laldinpuia and Goalkeeper Lalmuansanga respectively from their city rivals Electric Veng.

== Transfers ==
=== In ===
No.	Position	Player	Previous club	Date	Ref
	MF	David Laltlangsanga	Chanmari F.C.	26 August 2020	
	MF	Vanlalnghenga	Chanmari F.C.	26 August 2020	
	FW	Princewill Emeka	TRAU F.C.	27 August 2020	
	MF	Vanlalzuidika Chhakchhuak	Chanmari F.C.	27 August 2020	
	MF	Thasiama	Chhinga Veng F.C.	28 August 2020	
	DF	K.Lalmalsawma	Electric Veng FC	30 August 2020	
	DF	PC Laldinpuia	Electric Veng FC	9 September 2020	
	GK	Lalmuansanga	Electric Veng FC	13 September 2020	

== Kit ==
Supplier: Vamos / Sponsor: NE Consultancy Services

Home	Away	Goalkeeper

== Players ==
As of 2 January 2021

Note: Flags indicate national team as defined under FIFA eligibility rules; some limited exceptions apply. Players may hold more than one non-FIFA nationality.

No.	Pos.	Nation	Player
1	GK	IND	Lalremruata Arema
2	DF	IND	Lal Chungnunga
4	DF	IND	PC Laldinpuia
5	DF	UGA	Richard Kasagga
6	DF	IND	Vanlalzuidika Chhakchhuak
7	MF	IND	Lal Hmangaihkima
8	MF	IND	Joseph Vanlalhruaia
9	FW	IND	Lalliansanga
11	FW	IND	Lalmuankima H
12	DF	IND	Lalmawizuala
13	MF	IND	Lalrammawia Rammawia
14	MF	IND	Ayush Chhetri
15	FW	IND	Rohmingthanga Bawlte
17	MF	IND	Ramhlunchhunga

No.	Pos.	Nation	Player
18	FW	IND	Mc Malsawmzuala
20	MF	LBR	Alfred Jaryan (captain)
21	GK	IND	Zothanmawia
22	FW	IND	David Lalthansanga
23	MF	IND	Brandon Vanlalremdika
24	DF	IND	Chawnghlut Lalrosanga
26	DF	IND	K Lalmalsawma
29	FW	IND	F Lalremsanga
30	FW	Nigeria	Princewill Emeka
31	GK	IND	Lalmuansanga
39	DF	IND	Lalengmawia
44	GK	IND	Lalthakima Ralte

=== Out on loan ===
Note: Flags indicate national team as defined under FIFA eligibility rules; some limited exceptions apply. Players may hold more than one non-FIFA nationality.

No. / Pos. / Nation / Player	No. / Pos. / Nation / Player

== I-League ==
=== League table ===
Pos	Team	Pld	W	D	L	GF	GA	GD	Pts	Qualification or relegation
5	TRAU	10	4	4	2	17	13	+4	16	Promote to Championship Stage (Group A)
6	Mohammedan	10	4	4	2	9	8	+1	16	Promote to Championship Stage (Group A)
7	Aizawl	10	4	3	3	13	8	+5	15	Demote to Relegation Stage (Group B)
8	Sudeva Delhi	10	2	3	5	11	11	0	9	Demote to Relegation Stage (Group B)
9	Chennai City	10	3	0	7	7	19	−12	9	Demote to Relegation Stage (Group B)

Source: I-League
Rules for classification: 1) points; 2) head-to-head points; 3) head-to-head goal difference; 4) goal difference; 5) number of goals scored; 6) drawing of lots

=== Matches ===
Win Draw Loss

14.01.2020 1	Aizawl	0-1	Punjab	Kolkata
14.00 IST				Stadium: Salt Lake Stadium

20.01.2021 2	Aizawl	2-0	Gokulam Kerala	Kolkata
16.00 IST

24.01.2021 3	Aizawl	1-1	Indian Arrows	Kolkata
19.00 IST				Stadium: Kalyani Stadium, Kalyani

30.01.2021 4	Aizawl	2-1	NEROCA	Kolkata
14.00 IST				Stadium: Kalyani Stadium, Kalyani

03.02.2021 5	Aizawl	0-0	Churchill Brothers	Kolkata
19.00 IST				Stadium: Kalyani Stadium, Kalyani

09.02.2021 6	Aizawl	0-1	TRAU	Kolkata
19.00 IST				Stadium: Kalyani Stadium, Kalyani

14.02.2021 7	Aizawl	1-1	Sudeva Delhi	Kolkata
19.00 IST				Stadium: Kalyani Stadium, Kalyani

18.02.2021 8	Aizawl	3-0	Mohammedan	Kolkata
14.00 IST				Stadium: Kalyani Stadium, Kalyani

23.02.2021 9	Aizawl	1-3	Real Kashmir	Kolkata
14.00 IST				Stadium: Kalyani Stadium, Kalyani

10	Aizawl	3-0	Chennai City FC	Kolkata
14.00 IST				Stadium: Kalyani Stadium, Kalyani

=== Relegation Stage (Group B) ===
Pos	Team	Pld	W	D	L	GF	GA	GD	Pts	Qualification
1	Aizawl	10	4	3	3	13	8	+5	15	
2	Sudeva Delhi (Note: Sudeva Delhi were exempted from relegation for this season, as they had achieved a direct entry into the league.)	10	2	3	5	11	11	0	9	
3	Chennai City	10	3	0	7	7	19	−12	9	
4	NEROCA	10	2	2	6	13	15	−2	8	Relegation to 2021-22 2nd Division League
5	Indian Arrows (Note: Indian Arrows were exempted from relegation, as they are an AIFF developmental team.)	10	1	1	8	6	31	−25	4	

Updated to match(es) played on unknown. Source: I-League
Rules for classification: 1) points; 2) head-to-head points; 3) head-to-head goal difference; 4) goal difference; 5) number of goals scored; 6) drawing of lots

=== Matches ===
Win Draw Loss

11.03.2021 11	Aizawl	v	NEROCA	Kolkata
14.00 IST

16.03.2021 12	Aizawl	v	Indian Arrows	Kolkata
14.00 IST

20.03.2021 13	Aizawl	v	Chennai City FC	Kolkata
19.00 IST				Stadium: Kalyani Stadium, Kalyani

14	Aizawl	v	Sudeva Delhi	Kolkata
IST				Stadium: Kalyani Stadium, Kalyani

=== Goal Scorers ===
Rank	No.	Pos.	Nat.	Name	I League	IFA Shield	Indian Super Cup	Total
1	18	FW	(India)	Mc Malsawmzuala	2	0	0	2
2	13	FW	(India)	Lalrammawia Rammawia	1	0	0	1
2	5	DF	(Uganda)	Richard Kasagga	1	0	0	1
2	4	DF	(India)	PC Laldinpuia	1	0	0	1
2	20	MF	(Liberia)	Alfred Jaryan	1	0	0	1
2	9	FW	(India)	Lalliansanga	1	0	0	1
2	23	FW	(India)	R Malsawmtluanga	1	0	0	1
2	29	FW	(India)	Lalremsanga Fanai	1	0	0	1

== See also ==
- 2020–21 in Indian football
- 2020–21 I-League
