= 2015–16 Mizoram Premier League =

Mizoram Premier League
- Season: 2015–16
- Champions: Aizawl (2nd title)
- Relegated: Mizoram Police F.C.
- Matches played: 61
- Goals scored: 184 (3.02 per match)
- Top goalscorer: F. Lalrinpuia (13 goals)
- Biggest home win: Aizawl 7–0 Luangmual (2 October 2015)
- Biggest away win: Luangmual 0–6 BVT F.C. (14 November 2015)
- Highest scoring: Chanmari West F.C. 2–5 Chanmari (25 September 2015); Aizawl 7–0 Luangmual (2 October 2015)
- Longest winning run: Aizawl (5 games)
- Longest unbeaten run: Aizawl (7 games)
- Longest losing run: Luangmual (5 games)
- All statistics correct as of 15 December 2015.

The 2015–16 Mizoram Premier League (also known Mc Dowell's Mizoram Premier League Season 4 for sponsorship reasons) is the 4th season of the Mizoram Premier League which is the top tier of the Mizoram football system. The campaign began on 10 September 2015 and ended on 15 December 2015.

Aizawl F.C. won its 2nd title on 15 December 2015 after defeating Chanmari F.C. at the Lammual Stadium.

== Table ==
2015–16 Mizoram Premier League standings

Pos	Team	Pld	W	D	L	GF	GA	GD	Pts	Qualification or relegation
1	Aizawl (C)	14	10	2	2	35	15	+20	32	Advance to Semi-finals
2	Chanmari	14	8	2	4	30	15	+15	26	Advance to Semi-finals
3	BVT F.C.	14	6	6	2	27	17	+10	24	Advance to Semi-finals
4	Zo United F.C.	14	5	2	7	15	16	−1	17	Advance to Semi-finals
5	Dinthar F.C.	14	4	5	5	19	23	−4	17	
6	Chanmari West F.C.	14	4	2	8	20	34	−14	14	
7	Luangmual (R)	14	3	4	7	13	33	−20	13	Relegation Playoff
8	Mizoram Police F.C. (R)	14	3	3	8	17	23	−6	12	Relegation to 1st Division

Source: Mizoram Premier League 2015-16
Rules for classification: 1) points; 2) goal difference; 3) goals scored; 4) head-to-head result.
(C) Champions; (R) Relegated

=== Result Table ===
↓ Home ╲ Away →	AFC	BVT	CFC	CW	DFC	LFC	MP	ZFC
Aizawl		3–1	3–2	5–1	3–3	7–0	2–1	2–0
BVT F.C.	3–2		1–1	2–1	2–2	1–2	2–1	0–0
Chanmari	0–1	2–2		4–1	2–1	4–0	2–1	1–0
Chanmari West F.C.	0–1	1–3	2–5		1–0	3–3	1–3	0–2
Dinthar F.C.	2–1	2–2	1–0	2–3		1–0	3–2	1–5
Luangmual	1–1	0–6	0–3	2–3	1–1		1–2	1–1
Mizoram Police F.C.	1–2	0–0	0–3	2–2	0–0	0–1		1–4
Zo United F.C.	0–2	0–2	2–1	0–1	1–0	0–1	0–3	

Home team won; Match drawn; Away team won;

== Bracket ==
Semi-finals
1	Aizawl	2	1	3
4	Zo United F.C.	1	0	1
3	BVT F.C.	0	0	0
2	Chanmari	0	1	1

Finals
Aizawl	3
Chanmari	0

== Knockout Phase ==
All times are Indian Standard Time (IST) – UTC+05:30.

=== Semi-finals ===
*Away goal rule not applicable.

Team 1	Agg.	Team 2	1st leg	2nd leg
Aizawl	3–1	Zo United F.C.	2–1	1–0
Chanmari	1–0	BVT F.C.	0–0	1–0

==== First leg ====
3 December 2015	Aizawl	2–1	Zo United F.C.	Lammual Stadium
19:30	F.Lalrinpuia 68', 71'	Report	63' Isak Vanlalpeka

4 December 2015	Chanmari	0–0	BVT F.C.	Lammual Stadium
19:30		Report

==== Second leg ====
10 December 2015	Zo United FC	0–1	Aizawl	Lammual Stadium
19:30		Report	18' Brandon VL Remdika

11 December 2015	BVT F.C.	0–1	Chanmari	Lammual Stadium
19:30		Report	90+3' R.Laldanmawia

=== Final ===
15 December 2015	Aizawl	3–0	Chanmari	Lammual Stadium
19:30	Alfred Jaryan 27', 32'; Brandon VL Remdika 47'	Report

== Awards ==
Mizoram Premier League 4 Awards.

=== Club Awards ===
Award	Club
Champions	Aizawl
Runners Up	Chanmari F.C.

=== List of Individual Awards Winner ===
Awards	Player	Club
Best Player	F. Lalrinpuia	Aizawl
Top Scorer	F. Lalrinpuia	Aizawl
Best Forward	F. Lalrinpuia	Aizawl
Best Midfielder	K. Lalthathanga	BVT F.C.
Best Defender	Lalrinchhana Tochhawng	Chanmari F.C.
Best Goalkeeper	Lalawmpuia	Zo United

== Promotion & Relegation Playoff ==
Champions of district football associations took part in qualification. Four clubs played in round-robin format. The club which topped the group directly qualified for the 2016–17 season of Mizoram Premier League. The club which came 2nd will take part in play-offs against Luangmual F.C. which finished 7th in previous season.

Club	District
Champhai United FC	Champhai
Chhinga Veng	Aizawl
Project FC	Kolasib
Ramhlun North FC	Aizawl

=== Standings ===
Pos	Team	Pld	W	D	L	GF	GA	GD	Pts	Qualification
1	Ramhlun North F.C. (Q)	3	2	0	1	5	4	+1	6	Promoted to MPL5
2	Chhinga Veng (Q, O)	3	2	0	1	7	6	+1	6	MPL5 Promotion play-off
3	Project F.C.	3	1	1	1	4	4	0	4	
4	Champhai United F.C.	3	0	1	2	5	7	−2	1	

Updated to match(es) played on unknown. Source: MPL5 Final Table
Rules for classification: 1) points 2) head-to-head result .
(O) Play-off winners; (Q) Qualified for the phase indicated

=== Fixture & Results ===
All times are Indian Standard Time (IST) – UTC+05:30.

==== Matchday 1 ====
2 February 2016	Project F.C.	1–2	Chhinga Veng	Lammual Stadium
12:00	C. Lalnuntluanga 58'		12', 87' (pen.) Vanlalhriata

2 February 2016	Champhai United F.C.	1–2	Ramhlun North F.C.	Lammual Stadium
14:00	Zonunsanga 90+3'		8' Jerry Lalrinzuala; 83' David Lalrinchhana

==== Matchday 2 ====
5 February 2016	Chhinga Veng	3–2	Champhai United F.C.	Lammual Stadium
12:00	Lalrinhlua 63'; Vanlallawma 68'; Lalhmunsiama 74'		28' David Lalnunmawia; 39' Zonunsanga

5 February 2016	Ramhlun North F.C.	0–1	Project F.C.	Lammual Stadium
14:00			C. Tluanga

==== Matchday 3 ====
9 February 2016	Champhai United F.C.	2–2	Project F.C.	Rajiv Gandhi Stadium
12:00

9 February 2016	Chhinga Veng	2–3	Ramhlun North F.C.	Rajiv Gandhi Stadium
14:00

==== Playoffs ====
Team 1	Agg.	Team 2	1st leg	2nd leg
Luangmual F.C.	1–2	Chhinga Veng	0–1	1–1

===== First leg =====
12 February 2016	Luangmual F.C.	0–1	Chhinga Veng	Lammual Stadium
13:30			83' Vanlallawma

===== Second leg =====
15 February 2016	Chhinga Veng	1–1	Luangmual F.C.	Lammual Stadium
13:30	Vanlallawma 53'		24' Rosangliana
