= 2017–18 Mizoram Premier League =

Mizoram Premier League
- Season: 2017–18
- Champions: Chhinga Veng FC (1st title)
- Matches: 8
- Goals: 21 (2.63 per match)

The 2017–18 Mizoram Premier League is the sixth season of the Mizoram Premier League, the top-division football league in the Indian state of Mizoram. The league began on 31 August 2017 with eight teams competing.

== Teams ==
- Aizawl
- Bethlehem Vengthlang FC
- Chanmari
- Chanmari West FC
- Chhinga Veng
- Dinthar FC
- Mizoram Police
- Ramhlun North FC

== Standings ==
| Pos | Team | Pld | W | D | L | GF | GA | GD | Pts | Qualification or relegation |
|---|---|---|---|---|---|---|---|---|---|---|
| 1 | Chhinga Veng (C) | 14 | 10 | 3 | 1 | 28 | 15 | +13 | 33 | Advance to Semi-finals |
| 2 | Aizawl | 14 | 7 | 4 | 3 | 31 | 13 | +18 | 25 | Advance to Semi-finals |
| 3 | Mizoram Police FC | 14 | 6 | 2 | 6 | 33 | 35 | −2 | 20 | Advance to Semi-finals |
| 4 | Chanmari | 14 | 5 | 4 | 5 | 20 | 16 | +4 | 19 | Advance to Semi-finals |
| 5 | Ramhlun North | 14 | 5 | 4 | 5 | 23 | 22 | +1 | 19 | |
| 6 | Bethlehem Vengthlang | 14 | 4 | 4 | 6 | 16 | 24 | −8 | 16 | |
| 7 | Chanmari West (R) | 14 | 3 | 3 | 8 | 13 | 23 | −10 | 12 | Relegation play-offs |
| 8 | Dinthar (R) | 14 | 3 | 2 | 9 | 18 | 34 | −16 | 11 | Relegation to the Mizoram First Division |

Source: goalie365.com
Rules for classification: 1) Points; 2) Goal difference; 3) Goals scored
(C) Champions; (R) Relegated

== Finals ==
=== Bracket ===
Semi-Finals
1 | Chhinga Veng | 1 | 3 | 4
4 | Chanmari | 1 | 1 | 2
2 | Aizawl | 2 | 1 (5) | 3 (5)
3 | Mizoram Police FC | 2 | 1 (3) | 3 (3)

Finals
1 | Chhinga Veng | 1
2 | Aizawl | 0

=== Semi-finals ===
==== Leg 1 ====
| 23 November 2017 | Aizawl | 2–2 | Mizoram Police FC | Aizawl |
| 19:30 IST | Masih Saighani 22'; Lalhriatrenga 85' | Report | Lalrinpuia 7'; Lalfakzuala 90+4' | Stadium: Lammual |

| 24 November 2017 | Chhinga Veng | 1–1 | Chanmari | Aizawl |
| 19:30 IST | Joseph Hmar 77' OG | Report | Malsawmzuala 45' | Stadium: Lammual |

==== Leg 2 ====
| 30 November 2017 | Chanmari | 1–3 | Chhinga Veng | Aizawl |
| 19:30 IST | Malsawmzuala 36' | Report | R Malsawmtluanga 19'; K Lalthlahlova 85'; Malsawmfela 88' | Stadium: Lammual |

| 4 December 2017 | Mizoram Police FC | 1-1 (3-5 p) | Aizawl | Aizawl |
| 19:30 IST | Lalbhiaklua 17' | Report | H. Lalmuankima 14' | Stadium: Lammual |

=== Final ===
| 8 December 2017 | Chhinga Veng | 1-0 | Aizawl F.C. | Aizawl |
| 19.30 (IST) | R Malsawmtluanga 5' | Report | | Stadium: Lammual |

== Awards ==
After the league final, the following awards and respective winners were announced:

| Award | Player/Club |
|---|---|
| Best player of the Year | (India) R Malsawmtluanga |
| Golden boot | (India) Joseph Lalfakzuala |
| Best forward | (India) H. Lalmuankima |
| Best midfielder | (India) R Malsawmtluanga |
| Best defender | (India) R Laldinliana |
| Best goalkeeper | (India) F. Lalmuanawma |
| Young Player of the Year | (India) Rochharzela |
| Coach of the Year | (India) Lalbiaksanga Colney |

== Goalscorers ==
As of 8 September 2017

3 Goals

- (India) Malsawmfela (Chhinga Veng)

2 Goals

- (India) Fanai Lalrinpuia (Mizoram Police)

1 Goal

- (India) Lalrammawia (Bethlehem Vengthlang)
- (India) Vanlalthanga (Bethlehem Vengthlang)
- (India) H Lallianzama (Chanmari West)
- (India) Lalliansanga (Ramhlun North)
- (India) Jonathan Lalrawngbawla (Aizawl)
- (India) Laldampuia (Chhinga Veng)
- (India) Malsawmtluanga (Chhinga Veng)
- (India) Jacob Vanlalhlimpuia (Chanmari)
- (India) Rosangliama (Ramhlun North)
- (India) PC Lalthanthuanma (Dinthar)
- (India) PC Laldinpuia (Bethlehem Vengthlang)
- (India) Vanlallawma (Chhinga Veng)
- (India) R Malsawmtluanga (Chhinga Veng)
- (India) Lalmuanzuala (Chanmari)
- (India) David Lalrinmuana (Aizawl)
