= 2024–25 Mizoram Premier League =

Mizoram Premier League
- Season: 2024–25
- Dates: 9 July–15 Oct 2024
- Champions: Aizawl (5th title)
- Relegated: Sihphir Venghlun; Ramhlun Atletico; FC Bethlehem
- Matches: 56
- Goals: 213 (3.8 per match)
- Biggest home win: Aizawl FC 11-1 FC Bethlehem (18 September 2024)
- Biggest away win: Sihphir Venghlun 1-7 Mizoram Police (18 September 2024)
- All statistics correct as of complete.

The 2024–25 Mizoram Premier League was the eleventh season of the Mizoram Premier League, the top-division football league in the Indian state of Mizoram. The league began on 9 July 2024 with eight teams competing. Mizoram Police are the current defending champions.

Aizawl FC won Mizoram Premier League 11 by beating Mizoram Police in the finals. However, the tournament was beset by spot-fixing allegations leading the Mizoram Football Association to ban three clubs. Sihphir Venghlun, Ramhlun Atletico and FC Bethlehem all received three year bans.

== Teams ==
- Aizawl FC
- FC Bethlehem
- Chanmari FC
- SYS FC
- Chawnpui FC
- Sihphir Venghlun FC
- Mizoram Police FC
- Ramhlun Athletic FC

== Standings ==
Pos	Team	Pld	W	D	L	GF	GA	GD	Pts	Qualification or relegation
1	Aizawl (C)	14	10	4	0	44	10	+34	34	Advance to Semi-finals
2	Chanmari	14	9	4	1	31	12	+19	31	Advance to Semi-finals
3	Mizoram Police	14	5	4	5	35	25	+10	19	Advance to Semi-finals
4	Sihphir Venghlun (R)	14	6	1	7	22	36	−14	19	Advance to Semi-finals
5	Ramhlun Athletic (R)	14	4	4	6	25	32	−7	16	
6	SYS	14	4	4	6	17	22	−5	16	
7	Chawnpui	14	4	3	7	12	23	−11	15	
8	FC Bethlehem (R)	14	1	2	11	20	46	−26	5	Relegation to the Mizoram First Division

Source: Away End
Rules for classification: 1) Points; 2) Head-to-head points; 3) Goal difference
(C) Champions; (R) Relegated

== Matches ==
- All matches were held in RG Stadium
17 July 2024
12:30 IST

Sihphir Venghlun FC	4–2	FC Bethlehem
Malsawmtluanga Pautu 4'; Lalawmpuia 44'; PC Lalruatsanga 53'; PC Lalruatsanga 67'	Report

17 July 2024
15:30 IST

Chanmari FC	2–0	Chawnpui FC
Lalhmangaihsanga Suiremthanga 68'; PC Rosangzuala 79'	Report

18 July 2024
12:30 IST

Mizoram Police	2–3	SYS FC
Vanlalhriatrenga(OG) 4'; Michael Lalbiaksanga 51'	Report	Ricky Vanlalhriatsanga 36', 45+2'; Lalruatsanga 79'

18 July 2024
15:30 IST

Ramhlun Athletic FC	2–3	Aizawl FC
Lalawmpuia Hnamte 40'; Felix Lalruatsanga 75'	Report	C Lalmuanpuia 38'; Lalbiakdika Vanlalvunga 60'; Malsawmzuala Tlangte 83'

== Finals ==
=== Bracket ===
Semi-Finals
1	Aizawl FC	2	1	3
4	Sihphir Venghlun	0	0	0
2	Chanmari FC	1	0	1
3	Mizoram Police	2	0	2

Finals
1	Aizawl FC	1
2	Mizoram Police	0

=== Semi-finals ===
==== Leg 1 ====
7 October 2024	Aizawl FC	v	Sihphir Venghlun	Aizawl
20:00 IST				Stadium: Rajiv Gandhi Stadium (Aizawl)

8 October 2024	Chanmari FC	v	Mizoram Police	Aizawl
20:00 IST				Stadium: Rajiv Gandhi Stadium (Aizawl)

==== Leg 2 ====
Sihphir Venghlun	v	Aizawl FC	Aizawl
			Stadium: Rajiv Gandhi Stadium (Aizawl)

Mizoram Police	v	Chanmari FC	Aizawl
			Stadium: Rajiv Gandhi Stadium (Aizawl)

=== Final ===
Aizawl FC	v	Mizoram Police	Aizawl
			Stadium: Rajiv Gandhi Stadium (Aizawl)

=== Top scorers ===
Rank	Player	Club	Goals
1	(India) Felix Lalruatsanga	Ramhlun Athletic FC	8
2	(India) Lalbiakdika	Aizawl FC	7
3	(India) Lalthanpuia	Sihphir Venghlun FC	6
4	(India) Augustine Lalrochana	Aizawl FC	5
4	(India) Michael Lalbiaksanga	Mizoram Police FC	5
4	(India) Benjamin Lalnunpuia	Ramhlun Athletic FC	5

== See also ==
- Men
  - 2024–25 Indian Super League (Tier I)
  - 2024–25 I-League (Tier II)
  - 2024–25 I-League 2 (Tier III)
  - 2024–25 I-League 3 (Tier IV)
  - 2024–25 Indian State Leagues (Tier V)
  - 2025 Super Cup
  - 2024 Durand Cup
- Women
  - 2024–25 Indian Women's League
  - 2024–25 Indian Women's League 2
