= 2018–19 Mizoram Premier League =

Indian state football league season

Mizoram Premier League
- Season: 2018–19
- Champions: Aizawl F.C. (3rd title)
- Relegated: Bethlehem Vengthlang FC
- Matches played: 61
- Goals scored: 139 (2.28 per match)
- Top goalscorer: (India) MS Dawngliana (Chhinga Veng)
- All statistics correct as of 17 November 2018.

The 2018–19 Mizoram Premier League is the seventh season of the Mizoram Premier League, the top division football league in the Indian state of Mizoram. The league kicked off from 6 September 2018 with eight teams competing.

Aizawl FC won its 3rd title.

== Teams ==
- Aizawl
- Bethlehem Vengthlang FC
- Chanmari
- Chawnpui FC
- Chhinga Veng
- Electric Veng FC
- Mizoram Police
- Ramhlun North FC

== Standings ==
Pos	Team	Pld	W	D	L	GF	GA	GD	Pts	Qualification or relegation
1	Chhinga Veng	14	10	3	1	21	6	+15	33	Advance to Semi-finals
2	Aizawl	14	7	5	2	25	12	+13	26	Advance to Semi-finals
3	Mizoram Police F.C.	14	7	0	7	22	16	+6	21	Advance to Semi-finals
4	Chanmari	14	6	3	5	17	17	0	21	Advance to Semi-finals
5	Electric Veng FC	14	6	2	6	16	17	−1	20	
6	Chawnpui	14	3	6	5	13	18	−5	15	
7	Ramhlun North FC	14	2	5	7	14	27	−13	11	Relegation Playoff
8	BVT F.C.	14	2	2	10	13	27	−14	8	Relegation to 1st Division

Updated to match(es) played on 19 November 2018. Source: Mizoram Premier League 2018-19
Rules for classification: 1) Points; 2) Goal difference; 3) Goals scored

== Finals ==
Semi-Finals
Chhinga Veng	1	1	2
Chanmari F.C.	2	0	2
Aizawl F.C.	2	2	4
Mizoram Police F.C.	1	2	3

Finals
Chhinga Veng	1 (4)
Aizawl F.C.	1 (5)

=== Semi-finals ===
==== Leg 1 ====
24 November 2018	Chhinga Veng	1-0	Chanmari	Aizawl
7:00 PM IST		Report		Stadium: Lammual

26 November 2018	Aizawl	2-1	Mizoram Police FC	Aizawl
7:00 PM IST		Report		Stadium: Lammual

==== Leg 2 ====
29 November 2018	Chanmari	0-1	Chhinga Veng	Aizawl
7:00 PM IST		Report		Stadium: Lammual

1 December 2018	Mizoram Police FC	2-2	Aizawl	Aizawl
7:00 PM IST		Report		Stadium: Lammual

=== Final ===
17 December 2018	Chhinga Veng	1-1	Aizawl F.C.	Lammual
TBA

== Statistics ==
=== Scorers ===
Source: goalie365.com

1 goals

- (India) L.Lalnuntluanga (Chanmari)
- (India) Lalrosanga (Chanmari)
- (India) Lalnuntluanga (Chhinga Veng)
- (India) Lalnunzama (Ramhlun North FC)
- (India) Zosangliana (Chhinga Veng)
- (India) Laldingngheta (Ramhlun North FC)
- (Nigeria) Waheed Adekunle (Ramhlun North FC)
- (India) Jonathan Lalhriatkima (Bethlehem)
- (Liberia) Ansumana Kromah (Aizawl)
- (India) F Lalrintluanga (Electric Veng)
- (Ghana) John Anpong (Ramhlun North FC)
- (India) Vanrammawia Ngente (Chawnpui Veng)
- (India) Lalfakawma (Mizoram Police)
- (India) Remsanga (Electric Veng)
- (India) Lalruatfela (Chawnpui Veng)
- (India) Albert Zohmingmawia (Aizawl)
- (India) Lalhriatrenga (Aizawl)
- (India) Fela Zote (Aizawl)
- (India) C Lalnuntluanga (Bethlehem)
- (India) Lalmuanzova (Bethlehem)
- (India) MC Malsawmzuala (Chanmari)
- (India) B. Zoramthara (Mizoram Police)
- (India) K Lalnunpuia (Bethlehem)
- (India) C Vanlalhmangaihaa (Bethlehem)
- (India) Immanuel HS Lalthazuala (Chanmari)
- (India) Vanlalbiaa Chhangte (Chanmari)
- (India) F Lalremsanga (Aizawl)
- (India) K Lalthlahlova (Chhinga Veng)
- (India) Lalhlimpuia (Chawnpui Veng)
- (India) Lalfakzuala (Mizoram Police)
- (India) Jessy Vanlalmuana (Ramhlun North FC)
- (India) R Lalthanmawia (Electric Veng)
- (India) R Lalremsanga (Electric Veng)
- (India) Faka (Electric Veng)
- (India) Hmingthanmawia (Chhinga Veng)

2 goals

- (India) Lalramtharmawia (Mizoram Police)
- (India) F Lalrinpuia (Mizoram Police)
- (India) C Lalrintluanga (Bethlehem)
- (India) Mark Zothanpuia (Chanmari)
- (India) Laldinliana Varte (Bethlehem)
- (India) David Laltlansanga (Chawnpui Veng)
- (India) Lalrinfela (Aizawl)
- (India) PC Vanlalhruaia (Bethlehem)
- (India) Eric Lalsangzuala (Mizoram Police)
- (India) Lalrammawia (Chhinga Veng)
- (India) Rochharzela (Aizawl)
- (India) Jerry F Zonunsanga (Chawnpui Veng)
- (India) Lalremruata (Ramhlun North FC)
- (India) K Lalhmangaihkima (Aizawl)
- (India) Jacob Lalrawngbawla (Chhinga Veng)
- (India) Isak Vanlalruatfela (Aizawl)
- (India) H. Lalhlimpuia (Bethlehem)
- (Ivory Coast) Gatch Arthure Diomande (Chhinga Veng)
- (India) R. Malsawmtluanga (Mizoram Police)

3 goals

- (Liberia) Alfred Jaryan (Aizawl)
- (India) Lalromawia (Chhinga Veng)
- (India) Lalramtharmawia (Mizoram Police)
- (India) Lalbiakhlua (Mizoram Police)
- (India) Lalkhawpuimawia (Aizawl)
- (India) Malsawmfela (Mizoram Police)

4 goals

- (India) Isak Vanlalpeka (Electric Veng)
- (India) F.Lalremsanga (Aizawl)
- (India) Lalnunmawia (Ramhlun North FC)
- (India) Laldampuia (Chanmari)

5 goals

6 goals

- (India) David Lalchhuanawma (Electric Veng)
- (India) Vanlalthanga (Chawnpui Veng)
- (India) Lalnunzama (Chanmari FC)
- (India) Lalfakzuala (Mizoram Police)

7 goals

- (India) MS Dawngliana (Chhinga Veng)

=== Own Goal ===
- (Liberia) Alfred Jaryan (Aizawl)
- (India) Thomas Lalthlamuana (Chawnpui)
