= Laldinliana Renthlei =

Indian footballer

Personal information
- Date of birth: 26 August 1998 (age 28)
- Place of birth: Mizoram, India
- Height: 1.70 m (5 ft 7 in)
- Position: Right back

Team information
- Current team: Inter Kashi
- Number: 26

Youth career
- 2016—2018: Chhinga Veng

Senior career*
Years	Team	Apps	(Gls)
2017–2018	→ Aizawl (loan)	15	(0)
2018–2020	Chennaiyin	22	(0)
2020–2023	Jamshedpur	53	(0)
2023–2024	Odisha	4	(0)
2024–2026	Chennaiyin	28	(1)
2026–	Inter Kashi	2	(0)
- * Club domestic league appearances and goals as of 17 October 2026

Laldinliana Renthlei (born 26 August 1998) is an Indian professional footballer who plays as a defender for Indian Super League club Inter Kashi.

== Career ==
Born in Mizoram, Renthlei began his career in the Mizoram Premier League with Chhinga Veng. Renthlei had also represented Mizoram in the Santosh Trophy in 2017. In December 2017, he helped Chhinga Veng become the 2017–18 MPL champions after they defeated Aizawl in the final 1–0.

A couple weeks later, Renthlei joined Aizawl for their I-League campaign. He made his professional debut for the club on 27 December 2017 against Minerva Punjab. He started and played the whole match as Aizawl won 2–1. A month later, on 30 January 2018, Renthlei made his Asian club competition debut when he started for Aizawl during their AFC Champions League qualifier match against Iranian side Zob Ahan Esfahan. Once again he started and played the whole match but couldn't prevent Aizawl from losing 3–1.

He was signed by Chennaiyin in 2018-19 and made 11 appearances on his debut season. However, after failing to establish his name under John Gregory (footballer), his career at Chennaiyin FC was rejuvenated by Owen Coyle in the second half of the 2019–20 Indian Super League playing all the remaining games and would go on to earn himself a runners-up medal with Chennaiyin FC

On 3 September 2020, Jamshedpur FC announced the inclusion of Dinliana to its roster, joining his previous coach Owen Coyle who then recently signed for the Steel City of India side. He joined the club on a 3-year deal from ISL season 2020–21 to 2022–23. He will wear the same no. 21 as he did in Chennayin

== Career statistics ==
=== Club ===
As of 13 April 2024

Club	Season	League			National Cup		League Cup		AFC		Total	
Club	Season	Division	Apps	Goals	Apps	Goals	Apps	Goals	Apps	Goals	Apps	Goals
Chhinga Veng	2016–17	Mizoram Premier League			0	0	0	0	—			
Chhinga Veng	2017–18	Mizoram Premier League			0	0	0	0	—			
Chhinga Veng	Total				0	0	0	0	0	0		
Aizawl (loan)	2017–18	I-League	15	0	0	0	2 (Note: Appearance(s) in Super Cup)	0	7 (Note: Appearance(s) in AFC Champions League) (Note: Appearance(s) in AFC Cup)	0	24	0
Chennaiyin	2018–19	Indian Super League	11	0	0	0	5	0	7	0	23	0
Chennaiyin	2019–20	Indian Super League	11	0	0	0	0	0	—		11	0
Chennaiyin	Chennaiyin total		22	0	0	0	5	0	7	0	34	0
Jamshedpur	2020–21	Indian Super League	15	0	0	0	0	0	—		15	0
Jamshedpur	2021–22	Indian Super League	21	0	0	0	0	0	—		21	0
Jamshedpur	2022–23	Indian Super League	17	0	0	0	3	0	1 (Note: Appearance(s) in play-offs for AFC Champions League)	0	21	0
Jamshedpur	Total		53	0	0	0	3	0	7	0	57	0
Odisha	2023–24	Indian Super League	4	0	0	0	0	0	2	0	6	0
Chennaiyin	2024–25	Indian Super League	0	0	0	0	0	0	—		0	0
Career total			94	0	0	0	10	0	17	0	121	0

== Honours ==
Chhinga Veng

- Mizoram Premier League: 2017–18
