= Vanlalzuidika Chhakchhuak =

Indian footballer

Zuidika
Personal information
- Full name: Vanlalzuidika Chhakchhuak
- Date of birth: 17 March 1998 (age 28)
- Place of birth: Mizoram, India
- Height: 1.77 m (5 ft 9 1/2 in)
- Positions: Centre-back; right back

Team information
- Current team: Odisha
- Number: 34

Senior career*
Years	Team	Apps	(Gls)
2018–2020	Chhinga Veng	13	(0)
2020–2021	Aizawl	11	(0)
2021–2022	Sudeva Delhi	17	(1)
2022–2025	Mohammedan	43	(0)
2025–	Odisha	0	(0)
- * Club domestic league appearances and goals as of 21:07, 10 March 2025 (UTC)

Vanlalzuidika Chhakchhuak (born 17 March 1998), also known as Zuidika, is an Indian professional footballer who plays as a defender for Indian Super League club Odisha.

== Club career ==
=== Chhinga Veng ===
In 2018, Zuidika sign first senior contract with the current Mizoram Premier League and then I-League 2nd Division club Chhinga Veng. He made 9 appearances for the club during the 2018–19 I-League 2nd Division. Zuidika was a nominee for the best defender award in the 2018–19 Mizoram Premier League. After the 2019–20 Mizoram Premier League, Zuidika left the club for Aizawl.

=== Aizawl ===
On 29 August 2020, it was announced that Zuidika has signed with the I-League club Aizawl for the 2020–21 I-League season. He made his debut on 9 January 2021 against RoundGlass Punjab, which they lost 1–0 at full-time. He made a total of 11 appearances for the club throughout his debut campaign.

== Career statistics ==
=== Club ===
As of 10 March 2025

Club	Season	League			Cup		AFC		Total	
Club	Season	Division	Apps	Goals	Apps	Goals	Apps	Goals	Apps	Goals
Chhinga Veng	2018–19	I-League 2nd Division	13	0	0	0	–		13	0
Aizawl	2020–21	I-League	11	0	0	0	–		11	0
Sudeva Delhi	2021–22	I-League	17	1	2 (Note: Appearance(s) in Durand Cup)	0	–		19	1
Mohammedan	2022–23	I-League	7	0	4	0	–		11	0
Mohammedan	2023–24	I-League	14	0	2	0	–		16	0
Mohammedan	2024–25	Indian Super League	22	0	0	0	–		22	0
Mohammedan	Total		43	0	6	0	0	0	49	0
Career total			84	1	8	0	0	0	92	1
