= Laldanmawia Ralte =

Indian footballer

Danmawia Ralte
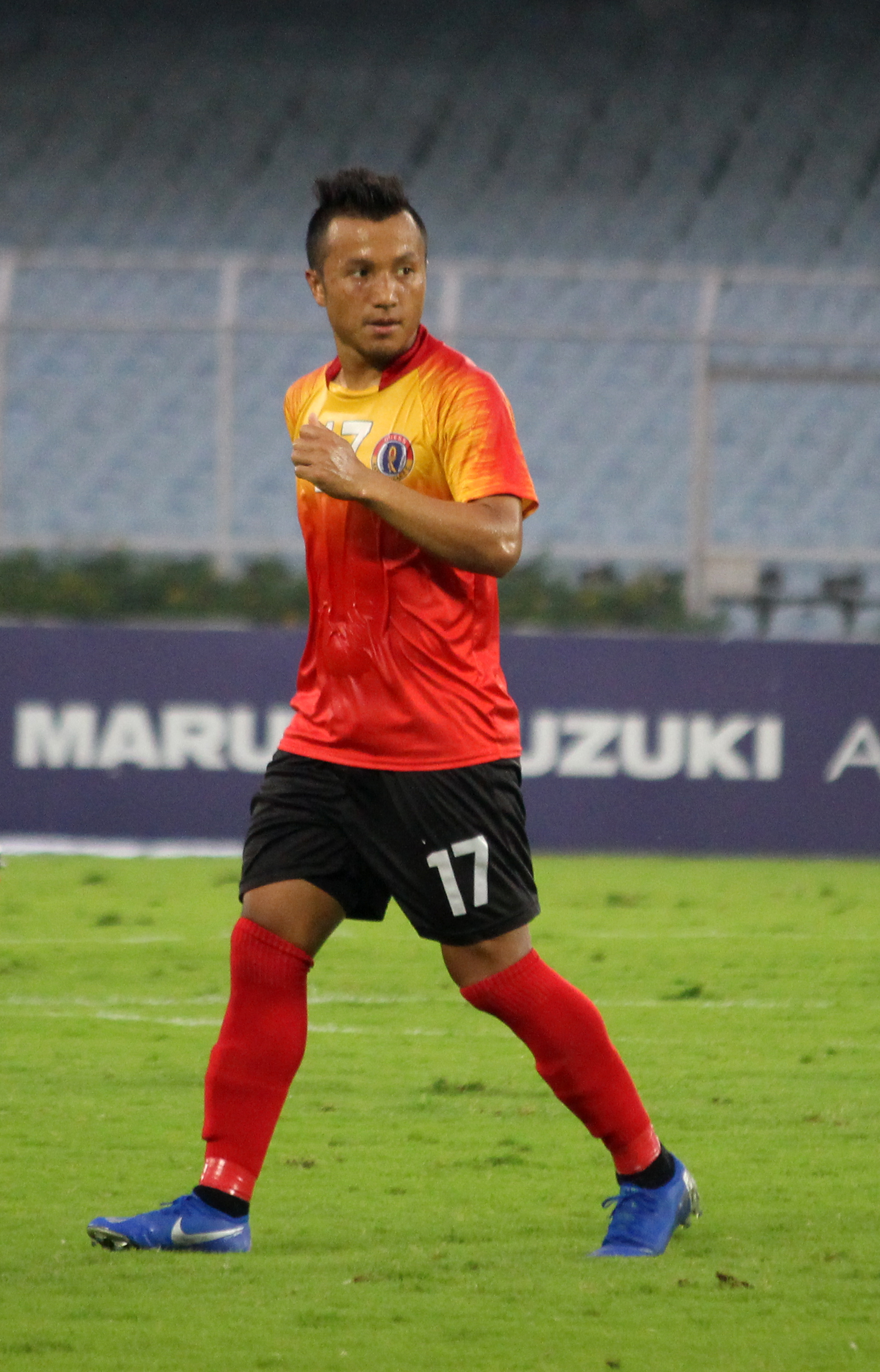
- Ralte with East Bengal in 2019

Personal information
- Full name: Laldanmawia Ralte
- Date of birth: 19 December 1992 (age 33)
- Place of birth: Sialhawk, Mizoram, India
- Height: 1.63 m (5 ft 4 in)
- Position: Winger

Youth career
- 2012–2014: Dinthar Football Club
- 2014–2015: Chanmari Football Club
- 2015: Chanmari West
- 2016: Madras Sporting Union

Senior career*
Years	Team	Apps	(Gls)
2016–2017	Aizawl	15	(3)
2017–2019	East Bengal	33	(11)
2019–2021	Hyderabad	7	(0)
2021–2023	NorthEast United	19	(4)

International career^{‡}
2018–	India	5	(0)
- * Club domestic league appearances and goals as of 6 January 2023 (UTC) ‡ National team caps and goals as of 13 November 2018

Laldanmawia Ralte (born 19 December 1992), popularly known as Danmawia, is an Indian professional footballer who plays as a winger.

== Club career ==
Born in Mizoram, Laldanmawia Ralte "The Sialhawk Express" began his career in the Mizoram Premier League Season 1 with Dinthar where he won the Best Player of the Season award and was tied for the top goalscorer in the league's first season. While playing club football, Laldanmawia also represented the Mizoram football team in various competitions. He is an important player of the Mizoram, Santosh Trophy champion team.

In early 2016, Laldanmawia left Mizoram to play in Tamil Nadu for MSU in the Chennai Super Division. After the season, he returned to Mizoram to sign with Chenmari West in the Mizoram Premier League.

=== Aizawl ===
In December 2016 it was revealed that Laldanmawia had signed with I-League side Aizawl for the 2016–17 season. He made his professional debut for the side in the league on 13 January 2017 against Minerva Punjab. He came on as a 62nd-minute substitute for Albert Zohmingmawia as Aizawl came out as 1–0 winners.

=== NorthEast United ===
On 3 September 2021, NorthEast United announced that they had completed the signing of Danmawia on a two-year deal. He made his debut for the club on 20 November against Bengaluru FC in a 4–2 loss. He scored his first goal on 13 December in a 1–5 lost against Hyderabad FC. Danmawia scored his second goal of the season on 22 January 2022 against Chennaiyin. By the end of the season Danmawia made thirteen appearance for Highlanders and scored four goals.

== International career ==
In June 2018, he was called up to the national team for the Intercontinental Cup, where he made his debut in the final against Kenya in a 2–0 win for his team.

== Career statistics ==
=== Club ===
As of 22 April 2023

Club	Season	League			Cup		AFC		Total	
Club	Season	Division	Apps	Goals	Apps	Goals	Apps	Goals	Apps	Goals
Aizawl	2016–17	I-League	15	3	4 (Note: Appearance(s) in Super Cup)	3	—		19	6
East Bengal	2017–18	I-League	14	3	4	1	—		18	4
East Bengal	2018–19	I-League	19	8	0	0	—		19	8
East Bengal	East Bengal total		33	11	4	1	0	0	37	12
Hyderabad	2019–20	Indian Super League	5	0	0	0	—		5	0
Hyderabad	2020–21	Indian Super League	2	0	0	0	—		2	0
Hyderabad	Hyderabad total		7	0	0	0	0	0	7	0
NorthEast United	2021–22	Indian Super League	13	4	—		—		13	4
NorthEast United	2022–23	Indian Super League	6	0	3	1	—		9	1
NorthEast United	NorthEast United total		19	4	3	1	0	0	22	5
Career total			74	18	11	5	0	0	85	23

== Honours ==
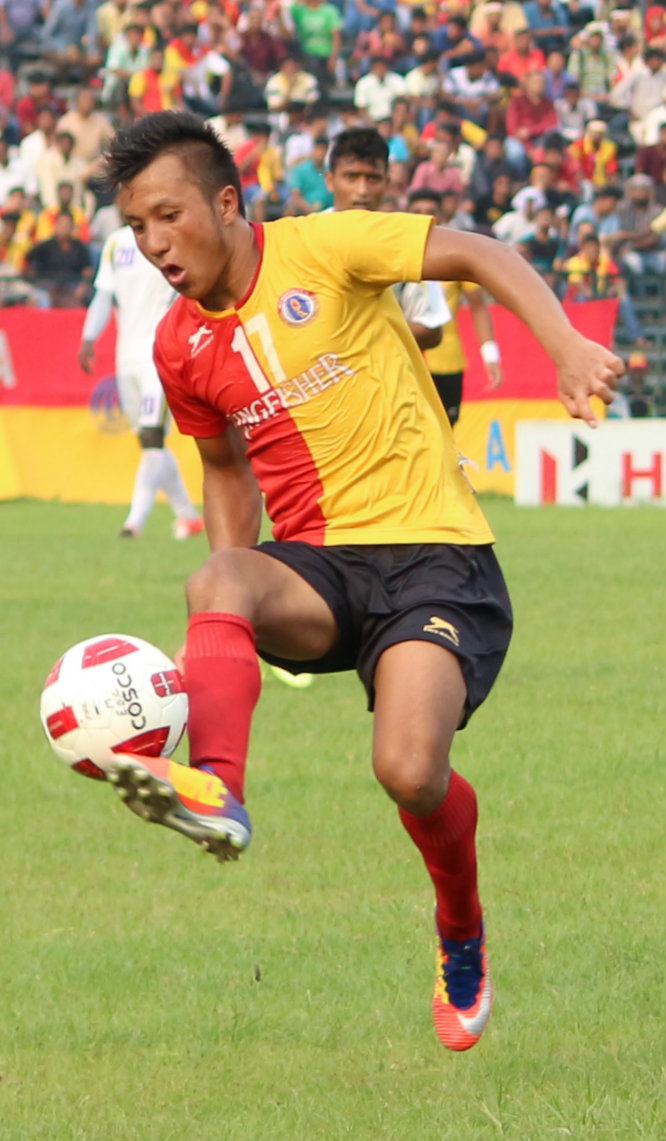
Laldanmawia Ralte in 2017

=== Club ===
Aizawl FC

- I-League(1): 2016–17

Dinthar FC

- Mizoram Premier League: 2012–13

=== Village ===
Durtlang

- Red-Ribbon Inter Village Football Tournament: 2011, Winner

Chanmari

- Red-Ribbon Inter Village Football Tournament: 2012, Winner

Ramhlun South

- NECS CUP: 2013, Winner

=== Individual ===
Best Player
Mizoram Premier League: 2012–13
