= 2019–20 Mizoram Premier League =

Mizoram Premier League
- Season: 2019–20
- Champions: Aizawl (4th title)
- Matches: 61
- Goals: 150 (2.46 per match)
- Top goalscorer: MC Malsawmzuala (10 goals)
- All statistics correct as of 14 December 2019.

The 2019–20 Mizoram Premier League is the eighth season of the Mizoram Premier League, the top division football league in the Indian state of Mizoram. The league will kick off from 5 September 2019 with eight teams competing.

Aizawl FC won its 4th title on 14 December 2019 after defeating Electric Veng FC.

== Teams ==
- Aizawl
- Chanmari
- Chawnpui
- Chhinga Veng
- Electric Veng FC
- Mizoram Police
- Ramhlun North FC
- FC Venghnuai

== Standings ==
Pos	Team	Pld	W	D	L	GF	GA	GD	Pts	Qualification or relegation
1	Aizawl	14	9	4	1	37	12	+25	31	Advance to Semi-finals
2	Mizoram Police F.C.	14	8	2	4	28	19	+9	26	
3	Chhinga Veng	14	5	6	3	24	20	+4	21	Advance to Semi-finals
4	Electric Veng F.C.	14	5	5	4	18	15	+3	20	Advance to Semi-finals
5	Chanmari	14	5	5	4	23	16	+7	20	Advance to Semi-finals
6	Chawnpui	14	3	3	8	17	32	−15	12	
7	F.C. Venghnuai	14	2	6	6	14	25	−11	12	
8	Ramhlun North F.C.	14	2	3	9	14	36	−22	9	Relegation to 1st Division

Source: indiafooty.com
Rules for classification: 1) Points; 2) Goal difference; 3) Goals scored

== Matches ==
=== Round 1 ===
5 September 2019	Electric Veng F.C.	1–1	F.C. Venghnuai	Aizawl
	Israel Laldingngheta 10' (OG)		Vanlalthanga 82'	Stadium: AR Ground

6 September 2019	Mizoram Police F.C.	2–1	Chawnpui F.C.	Aizawl
	F Lalrinpuia 14'; Lalhmunmawia 49'		C Lalremruata 74'	Stadium: AR Ground

6 September 2019	Aizawl	2–2	Chhinga Veng	Aizawl
	Isak Vanlalruatfela 27'; Lalramhmunmawia 90+4'		MC Malsawmzuala 43', 71' (pen.)	Stadium: AR Ground

6 September 2019	Chanmari	3–1	Ramhlun North F.C.	Aizawl
	H Lalmuankima 16'; Lalnunzama 54'; MS Dawngliana 90+4'		Jessey Vanlalmuana 44'	Stadium: AR Ground

=== Round 2 ===
12 September 2019	Chanmari	2–3	Mizoram Police F.C.	Aizawl
	David Lalrinmuana 5', 80'		Lalbiakhlua 34'; Malsawmfela 48'; Lalbiaknunga 89'	Stadium: AR Ground

12 September 2019	Electric Veng F.C.	0–0	Aizawl	Aizawl
				Stadium: AR Ground

13 September 2019	Chawnpui F.C.	0–3	Ramhlun North F.C.	Aizawl
			Jessy Vanlalmuana 4'; Kaleba Lalnunhlima 12'; Lalthankhuma 87'	Stadium: AR Ground

13 September 2019	Chhinga Veng	1–1	F.C. Venghnuai	Aizawl
	Ouattara Sie 51'		Lalruatfela 45+2'	Stadium: AR Ground

=== Round 3 ===
3 October 2019	Chhinga Veng	2-2	Chanmari	Aizawl
				Stadium: AR Ground

3 October 2019	Chawnpui F.C.	1-3	Electric Veng F.C.	Aizawl
				Stadium: AR Ground

4 October 2019	Aizawl	1-0	Mizoram Police F.C.	Aizawl
				Stadium: AR Ground

4 October 2019	F.C. Venghnuai	1-0	Ramhlun North F.C.	Aizawl
				Stadium: AR Ground

=== Round 4 ===
8 October 2019	Chawnpui F.C.	1-1	F.C. Venghnuai	Aizawl
				Stadium: AR Ground

8 October 2019	Aizawl	0–0	Chanmari	Aizawl
				Stadium: AR Ground

9 October 2019	Ramhlun North F.C.	1–4	Mizoram Police F.C.	Aizawl
	Lalremsanga 8'		F Lalrinpuia 68'; Lalsangbera 77', 83'; Lalfakzuala 90'	Stadium: AR Ground

9 October 2019	Chhinga Veng	2–1	Electric Veng F.C.	Aizawl
	Vanlalzuidika 26'; MC Malsawmzuala 75'		PC Laldinpuia 85'	Stadium: AR Ground

=== Round 5 ===
10 October 2019	F.C. Venghnuai	1–2	Chanmari	Aizawl
				Stadium: AR Ground

10 October 2019	Aizawl	2–0	Chawnpui F.C.	Aizawl
				Stadium: AR Ground

11 October 2019	Mizoram Police F.C.	1–2	Electric Veng F.C.	Aizawl
				Stadium: AR Ground

11 October 2019	Ramhlun North F.C.	1–3	Chhinga Veng	Aizawl
				Stadium: AR Ground

== Finals ==
Semi-Finals
Aizawl F.C.	1	1	2
Chanmari F.C.	0	1	1
Chhinga Veng	0	1	4
Electric Veng FC	0	1	5

Finals
Aizawl	2
Electric Veng FC	0

=== 1st leg ===
3 December 2019	Aizawl F.C.	1–0	Chanmari F.C.	Aizawl
	Isak Vanlalruatfela 73'			Stadium: AR Ground

4 December 2019	Chhinga Veng	0–0	Electric Veng FC	Aizawl
				Stadium: AR Ground

=== 2nd leg ===
10 December 2019	Electric Veng FC	1–1	Chhinga Veng	Aizawl
				Stadium: AR Ground

11 December 2019	Chanmari F.C.	1–1	Aizawl F.C.	Aizawl
				Stadium: AR Ground

=== Final ===
14 December 2019	Aizawl F.C.	2–0	Electric Veng FC	Aizawl
				Stadium: AR Ground

== Statistics ==
=== Scorers ===
11 goals

- (India) MC Malsawmzuala (Chhinga Veng)

10 goals

- (India) Lalremsanga (Aizawl)

8 goals

- (Liberia) Alfred Jaryan (Aizawl)
