= Lalrammawia Rammawia =

Indian footballer

Personal information
- Date of birth: 9 January 1991 (age 35)
- Place of birth: Mizoram, India
- Position: Forward

Team information
- Current team: Aizawl F.C.
- Number: 13

Senior career*
| Years | Team | Apps | (Gls) |
| 2017–2018 | Bethlehem Vengthlang | 9 | (2) |
| 2018–2019 | Chhinga Veng FC | 12 | (1) |
| 2019–2020 | Three Star Club | 12 | (1) |
| 2020–2021 | Aizawl | 8 | (1) |
| 2021–2022 | Three Star Club | 4 | (0) |
- * Club domestic league appearances and goals as of 17 December 2021

Lalrammawia Rammawia (born 9 January 1991) is an Indian professional footballer who plays as a forward for Nepali outfit Three Star Club in the Martyr's Memorial A-Division League.

== Career ==
Born in Mizoram, Lalrammawia was part of Mizoram football team which played semi-finals of 2016–17 Santosh Trophy. He also played for Bethlehem Vengthlang FC and Chhinga Veng FC in Mizoram Premier League and later moved to Three Star Club of Nepal. He appeared with Chhinga Veng, that finished as runners–up in 2018–19 Mizoram Premier League by losing to I-League side Aizawl FC on penalties in the final.

On 9 January 2021, Lalrammawia made his debut in I-League and also for his club against Punjab FC. He scored his first goal for club and in I-league against Gokulam Kerala FC on 20 January 2021, the match ended in 2–0 victory for Aizwal FC.

In November 2021, he again moved to Nepal and resigned with Three Star Club ahead of the team's 2021–22 Martyr's Memorial A-Division League season. They won 3–0 in their first match against Chyasal Youth Club on 20 November.

== Career statistics ==
As of 5 April 2021

| Club | Season | League | | | Federation Cup | | Durand Cup | | AFC | | Total | |
| Club | Season | Division | Apps | Goals | Apps | Goals | Apps | Goals | Apps | Goals | Apps | Goals |
|---|---|---|---|---|---|---|---|---|---|---|---|---|
| Aizawl | 2020–21 | I-League | 8 | 1 | 0 | 0 | 0 | 0 | — | — | 8 | 1 |
| Career total | | | 8 | 1 | 0 | 0 | 0 | 0 | 0 | 0 | 8 | 1 |

== Honours ==
Chhinga Veng

- I-League 2nd Division runner-up: 2018–19
- Mizoram Premier League runner-up: 2018–19
- MFA Super Cup: 2018
- Independence Day Cup: 2018

Three Star Club

- Madan Bhandari Memorial Ithari Gold Cup: 2019
- Satashi Gold Cup: 2020

== See also ==
- List of Indian football players in foreign leagues
