= P. C. Laldinpuia =

Indian footballer

Laldinpuia
Personal information
- Full name: Laldinpuia Pachuau
- Date of birth: 29 November 1996 (age 29)
- Place of birth: Mizoram, India
- Height: 1.80 m (5 ft 11 in)
- Positions: Centre-back; defensive midfielder

Team information
- Current team: Chennaiyin

Senior career*
Years	Team	Apps	(Gls)
2018–2019	Chhinga Veng	13	(1)
2020–2021	Aizawl	14	(1)
2021–2024	Jamshedpur	35	(1)
2024–	Chennaiyin	29	(1)
- * Club domestic league appearances and goals as of 19:45, 16 May 2026 (UTC)

Laldinpuia Pachuau (born 29 November 1996), commonly known as Dinpuia, is an Indian professional footballer who plays as a centre-back for Indian Super League club Chennaiyin.

== Club career ==
Born in Mizoram, Laldinpuia began his career with Mizoram Premier League side Bethlehem Vengthlang before moving to Chhinga Veng. After the 2018–19 season, Laldinpuia was awarded the Best Defender award in the Mizoram Premier League. He also participated with the club during their 2nd Division campaign.

Following good performances in the Mizoram Premier League, Laldinpuia was called up to represent Mizoram in the Santosh Trophy in both 2018 and 2019.

=== Aizawl ===
On 9 September 2020, Laldinpuia joined I-League side Aizawl for the 2020–21 season. He made his debut for the club on 9 January 2021 in their season opening 0–1 defeat against Punjab. Laldinpuia then scored his first professional goal on 30 January 2021 against NEROCA. His 37th-minute goal was the opener in a 2–1 victory.

== Career statistics ==
=== Club ===
As of 14 January 2025

Club	Season	League			Cup		AFC		Total	
Club	Season	Division	Apps	Goals	Apps	Goals	Apps	Goals	Apps	Goals
Chhinga Veng	2018–19	I-League 2nd Division	13	1	0	0	—		13	1
Aizawl	2020–21	I-League	14	1	0	0	—		14	1
Jamshedpur	2021–22	Indian Super League	6	0	0	0	—		6	0
Jamshedpur	2022–23	Indian Super League	8	0	1 (Note: Appearance(s) in Super Cup)	0	1 (Note: Appearance in playoff for AFC Champions League)	0	10	0
Jamshedpur	2023–24	Indian Super League	21	1	3	0	—		24	1
Jamshedpur	Total		35	1	4	0	1	0	40	1
Chennaiyin	2024–25	Indian Super League	14	0	0	0	—		14	0
Career total			76	3	4	0	1	0	81	3

== Honours ==
Individual

- Mizoram Premier League Best Defender: 2018–19
