= 2012–13 Mizoram Premier League =

Mizoram Premier League
- Season: 2012–13
- Champions: Dinthar FC (1st title)
- Relegated: F.C. RS Annexe
- Matches played: 84
- Goals scored: 238 (2.83 per match)
- Top goalscorer: MS Dawngliana (10 goals) (Chanmari)
- Highest scoring: Mizoram Police 5–1 Reitlang; 31 October 2012
- Longest winning run: 4 games Mizoram Police
- Longest unbeaten run: 7 games Dinthar; Mizoram Police
- Longest losing run: 5 games RS Annexe

The 2012–13 Mizoram Premier League (Also known as the Mahindra 2 Wheelers Mizoram Premier League for sponsorship reasons) is the 1st season of the Mizoram Premier League which is the third tier of the Indian football system and the top tier of the Mizoram football system.

== Teams ==
Club	Play-off position
Aizawl	1st
Chanmari	3rd
Dinthar	N/A
FC Kulikawn	N/A
Luangmual	N/A
Mizoram	N/A
RS Annexe	4th
Reitlang	2nd

== Play-Off ==
Pos	Team	Pld	W	D	L	GF	GA	GD	Pts	Qualification or relegation
1	Aizawl	7	4	2	1	13	5	+8	14	Mizoram Premier League
2	Reitlang	7	4	2	1	12	4	+8	14	Mizoram Premier League
3	Chanmari	7	4	2	1	11	6	+5	14	Mizoram Premier League
4	RS Annexe	7	4	0	3	8	7	+1	12	Mizoram Premier League
5	Kannan	7	3	3	1	18	13	+5	12	
6	Chanmari West	7	2	1	4	12	14	−2	7	
7	College Veng	7	1	0	6	8	25	−17	3	
8	Theiriat	7	0	2	5	8	16	−8	2	

Updated to match(es) played on unknown. Source:

13 July 2012	RS Annexe	1 – 0	Chanmari West
		Report

13 July 2012	Kannan	1 – 0	Reitlang
		Report

14 July 2012	Aizawl	5 – 0	College Veng
		Report

14 July 2012	Chanmari	3 – 1	Theiriat
		Report

16 July 2012	Kanan	4 – 4	Theiriat
		Report

16 July 2012	Aizawl	2 – 0	RS Annexe
		Report

17 July 2012	Reitlang	4 – 1	College Veng
		Report

17 July 2012	Chanmari	3 – 2	Chanmari West
		Report

18 July 2012	RS Annexe	2 – 1	Kanan
		Report

18 July 2012	Aizawl	0 – 0	Theiriat
		Report

19 July 2012	Reitlang	3 – 1	Chanmari West
		Report

19 July 2012	Chanmari	2 – 0	College Veng
		Report

20 July 2012	RS Annexe	3 – 1	Theiriat
		Report

20 July 2012	Kannan	3 – 1	Aizawl
		Report

21 July 2012	Chanmari	0 – 0	Reitlang
		Report

21 July 2012	Chanmari West	5 – 2	College Veng
		Report

23 July 2012	Aizawl	1 – 1	Reitlang
		Report

23 July 2012	Chanmari	1 – 0	RS Annexe
		Report

24 July 2012	College Veng	1 – 0	Theiriat
		Report

24 July 2012	Kanan	1 – 1	Chanmari West
		Report

25 July 2012	Aizawl	2 – 1	Chanmari
		Report

25 July 2012	RS Annexe	0 – 2	Reitlang
		Report

26 July 2012	Kanan	7 – 4	College Veng
		Report

26 July 2012	Chanmari West	3 – 2	Theiriat
		Report

28 July 2012	Aizawl	2 – 0	Chanmari West
		Report

28 July 2012	Chanmari	1 – 1	Kanan
		Report

28 July 2012	Reitlang	2 – 0	Theiriat
		Report

28 July 2012	RS Annexe	2 – 0	College Veng
		Report

== Table ==
Pos	Team	Pld	W	D	L	GF	GA	GD	Pts	Qualification or relegation
1	Dinthar	14	9	3	2	26	18	+8	30	Champions
2	Mizoram Police	14	8	2	4	27	16	+11	26	
3	Chanmari	14	7	3	4	21	12	+9	24	
4	FC Kulikawn	14	5	5	4	15	13	+2	20	
5	Aizawl	14	6	2	6	17	17	0	20	
6	Reitlang	14	3	5	6	18	26	−8	14	
7	Luangmual	14	3	2	9	15	21	−6	11	
8	FC RS Annexe	14	3	2	9	9	25	−16	11	Relegation to 1st Division

Updated to match(es) played on 17 February 2013. Source:
Rules for classification: 1) points; 2) goal difference; 3) number of goals scored.

== Fixtures and results ==
=== Round 1 ===
24 October 2012	Chanmari	1 – 1	Luangmual	AR Lammual Stadium, Aizawl
Wednesday 14:30 IST	Rochhingpuia 65' (pen.)	Report	Lalbiaktluanga 32'

25 October 2012	Reitlang	1 – 2	Aizawl	AR Lammual Stadium, Aizawl
Thursday 14:30 IST	Lalruatfela 69'	Report	Zoremtluanga 90'; Lalremruata 90+3'

26 October 2012	FC Kulikawn	1 – 2	Dinthar	AR Lammual Stadium, Aizawl
Friday 12:00 IST	Singh 90'	Report	Laltlanthanga 16'; Laldanmawia 40'

26 October 2012	Mizoram Police	1 – 2	FC RS Annexe	AR Lammual Stadium, Aizawl
Friday 14:30 IST	F. Lalrinpuia 69'	Report	Laltlantluanga 28'; Lalduhsaka 67'

=== Round 2 ===
31 October 2012	Reitlang	1 – 5	Mizoram Police	AR Lammual Stadium, Aizawl
Wednesday 14:30 IST	Lallianzama 49'	Report	Lalnunmawia 39' (pen.); Lalbiakhlua 62'; F. Lalrinpuia 68', 84', 89'

1 November 2012	Luangmual	1 – 2	FC Kulikawn	AR Lammual Stadium, Aizawl
Thursday 14:30 IST	Lalmuankima 58'	Report	Zoramthara 34'; Kingsley 42'

2 November 2012	Aizawl	1 – 1	Dinthar	AR Lammual Stadium, Aizawl
Friday 14:30 IST	Malsawmzuala 34'	Report	Lalnunmawia 8'

24 November 2012	Chanmari	2 – 0	FC RS Annexe	AR Lammual Stadium, Aizawl
Saturday	Zomuanpuia 56'; Dawngliana 77'	Report (Mizo)

=== Round 3 ===
7 November 2012	FC Kulikawn	0 – 0	Aizawl	AR Lammual Stadium, Aizawl
Wednesday 14:30 IST		Report (Mizo)

8 November 2012	Dinthar	4 – 1	FC RS Annexe	AR Lammual Stadium, Aizawl
Thursday 14:30 IST	Lalnunmawia 7', 13'; Laldanmawia 51'; Lalmuansanga 63'	Report	Lalduhsaka 2'

9 November 2012	Reitlang	1 – 0	Chanmari	AR Lammual Stadium, Aizawl
Friday 14:30 IST	Vanchhawng 77'	Report (Mizo)

10 November 2012	Mizoram Police	2 – 1	Luangmual	AR Lammual Stadium, Aizawl
Saturday 14:30 IST	Lalbiakhlua 37'; Lalchhuantlinga 69'	Report (Mizo)	Denghmingthanga 57'

=== Round 4 ===
14 November 2012	RS Annexe	0 – 1	Reitlang	AR Lammual Stadium, Aizawl
Wednesday 14:00 IST		Report (Mizo)	Vanchhawng 32'

15 November 2012	Dinthar	2 – 2	Mizoram Police	AR Lammual Stadium, Aizawl
Thursday 14:00 IST	Lalnunmawi 1'; Laldanmawia 19'	Report (Mizo)	Lalnunmawia 18'; Lalbiakhlua 58'

16 November 2012	FC Kulikawn	0 – 0	Chanmari	AR Lammual Stadium, Aizawl
Friday 14:00 IST		Report (Mizo)

17 November 2012	Aizawl	1 – 2	Luangmual	AR Lammual Stadium, Aizawl
Saturday 14:00 IST	Lalremruata 59'	Report	Varte 23'; Lalruatdika 90+3'

=== Round 5 ===
28 November 2012	Mizoram Police	3 – 1	FC Kulikawn	AR Lammual Stadium, Aizawl
Wednesday 14:00 IST	Lalbiakhlua 42', 70'; Lalfakzuala 55'	Report (Mizo)	Zoramthara 87'

29 November 2012	Aizawl	0 – 2	Chanmari	AR Lammual Stadium, Aizawl
Thursday 14:00 IST		Report (Mizo)	Rochhingpuia 40'; Lalnuntluanga 47'

30 November 2012	Luangmual	3 – 0	RS Annexe	AR Lammual Stadium, Aizawl
Friday 14:00 IST	Rosangliana 17'; Denghmingthanga 62', 90+4'	Report (Mizo)

1 December 2012	Reitlang	1 – 1	Dinthar	AR Lammual Stadium, Aizawl
Saturday 14:00 IST	Zirsangzela 69'	Report (Mizo)	Laldanmawia 21'

=== Round 6 ===
5 December 2012	Aizawl	1 – 0	RS Annexe	AR Lammual Stadium, Aizawl
Wednesday 14:00 IST	Lalthazuala 34'	Report (Mizo)

6 December 2012	Chanmari	0 – 1	Mizoram Police	AR Lammual Stadium, Aizawl
Thursday 14:00 IST		Report (Mizo)	Lalruatthanga 77'

7 December 2012	Dinthar	2 – 1	Luangmual	AR Lammual Stadium, Aizawl
Friday 14:00 IST	Lalhriatzuala 6'; Zoremsanga 28'	Report (Mizo)	Rosangliana 2'

8 December 2012	FC Kulikawn	3 – 1	Reitlang	AR Lammual Stadium, Aizawl
Saturday 14:00 IST	Zoramthara 15'; Lalramliana 73'; Lalnuntluanga 80'	Report	Laltlankima 59'

=== Round 7 ===
8 December 2012	Aizawl	0 – 1	Mizoram Police	AR Lammual Stadium, Aizawl
Saturday 11:00 IST		Report (Mizo)	Lalfakzuala 39'

12 December 2012	Chanmari	2 – 0	Dinthar	AR Lammual Stadium, Aizawl
Wednesday 14:00 IST	Dawngliana 90+2'; Lalnghinglova 90+5'	Report

13 December 2012	Luangmual	3 – 1	Reitlang	AR Lammual Stadium, Aizawl
Thursday 14:00 IST	Lalrimawia 6'; Varte 26'; Lalmuankima 71'	Report	Vanlalrinpuia 60'

14 December 2012	RS Annexe	0 – 0	FC Kulikawn	AR Lammual Stadium, Aizawl
Friday 14:00 IST		Report (Mizo)

=== Round 8 ===
18 January 2013	Dinthar	2 – 1	FC Kulikawn	AR Lammual Stadium, Aizawl
12:00 IST Friday	Lalhriatzuala 36'; Lalnunmawia 45+1'	Report	Sailo 12'

18 January 2013	Luangmual	1 – 2	Aizawl	AR Lammual Stadium, Aizawl
14:30 IST Friday	Lalsangzuala 54'	Report	Zohmingmawia 42'; Lalnuntluanga 80'

19 January 2013	Reitlang	1 – 1	RS Annexe	AR Lammual Stadium, Aizawl
12:00 IST Saturday	Lalfakzuala 32'	Report	Malsawmtluanga 18'

19 January 2013	Mizoram Police	2 – 1	Chanmari	AR Lammual Stadium, Aizawl
14:30 IST Saturday	Lalnunmawia 59', 88'	Report	Lalnuntluanga 65'

=== Round 9 ===
23 January 2013	Aizawl	3 – 1	RS Annexe	AR Lammual Stadium, Aizawl
12:15 IST, Wednesday	Lalremdika 49'; Lallawmawma 71'; Lalthazuala 76'	Report (Mizo)	Lalhungchhunga 18'

23 January 2013	Reitlang	0 – 0	Luangmual	AR Lammual Stadium, Aizawl
15:15 IST, Wednesday		Pictures

24 January 2013	Chanmari	1 – 1	FC Kulikawn	AR Lammual Stadium, Aizawl
12:45 Indian Standard Time, Thursday	Zomuanpuia 56'	Report	Zoramthara 27'

24 January 2013	Mizoram Police	1 – 2	Dinthar	AR Lammual Stadium, Aizawl
14:45 IST, Thursday	Lalrinpuia 59'	Report	Laldanmawia 22', 90+3'

=== Round 10 ===
29 January 2013	Luangmual	0 – 3	Mizoram Police	AR Lammual Stadium, Aizawl
12:45 IST, Tuesday		Report	Lalbiakhlua 52'; Lalnunmawia 54'; Lalrinpuia 88'

29 January 2013	FC Kulikawn	0 – 1	RS Annexe	AR Lammual Stadium, Aizawl
14:45 IST, Tuesday		Report (Mizo)	Lalhruaitluanga 33'

30 January 2013	Chanmari	0 – 1	Aizawl	AR Lammual Stadium, Aizawl
12:45 IST, Wednesday		Report	Joel 31'

30 January 2013	Dinthar	2 – 1	Reitlang	AR Lammual Stadium, Aizawl
14:45 IST, Wednesday	Lalnunmawia 5'; Zosangliana 88'	Report	Lalruatfela 90+4'

=== Round 11 ===
11 April 2013	FC RS Annexe	2 – 1	Luangmual	AR Lammual Stadium, Aizawl
14:30 IST, Thursday	Zoliana 4'; Lalhruaitluanga 86'	Report	Lalremmawia 37'

12 April 2013	Aizawl	2 – 3	Reitlang	AR Lammual Stadium, Aizawl
14:40 IST, Tuesday	Lalnuntluanga 11'; Morgan 53'	Report (Mizo)	Zirsangzela 26'; Lalfakzuala 36'; Lalruatfela 67'

13 April 2013	Dinthar	1 – 3	Chanmari	AR Lammual Stadium, Aizawl
14:30 IST, Wednesday	Zothanzama 68'	Score	Dawngliana 13', 61', 90+5'

22 April 2013	FC Kulikawn	v	Mizoram Police	AR Lammual Stadium, Aizawl
12:00 IST, Wednesday

== Top scorers ==
Top scorers up to Round 11.

Rank	Player	Club	Goals
1	(India) Laldanmawia	Dinthar	6
1	(India) Lalnunmawia	Dinthar	6
1	(India) F. Lalrinpuia	Mizoram Police	6
4	(India) Lalbiakhlua	Mizoram Police	5
4	(India) C. Lalnunmawia	Mizoram Police	5
4	(India) MS Dawngliana	Chanmari	5
7	(India) Zoramthara	Kulikawn	4
