= K. Lalhmangaihkima =

Indian footballer

K Lalhmangaihkima
Personal information
- Date of birth: 14 September 1999 (age 27)
- Place of birth: India
- Position: Midfielder

Senior career*
Years	Team	Apps	(Gls)
2018–2022	Aizawl	15	(0)
2022	Tei Memorial Futsal Club		
2023–	Chanmari FC		
- * Club domestic league appearances and goals

K Lalhmangaihkima (born 14 September 1999) is an Indian professional footballer who plays as a midfielder.

== Career ==
=== Aizawl ===
Lalhmangaihkima signed his first senior contract with Aizawl in 2018. He was included in the squad for the 2018–19 I-League season.

Lalhmangaihkima made his debut for the club, on 25 February 2019, against East Bengal, by coming on as a substitute for captain Alfred Jaryan in the 84th-minute of the game, which ended in a 1–1 draw. He only made just two appearances for the club in the 2018–19 I-League season.

Lalhmangaihkima continued to play for Aizawl for the 2019–20 I-League season. He played his first game of the season against TRAU FC on 11 February 2019 as a substitute which they won 2–0. Lalhmangaihkima played against Chennai City FC as a substitute which ended up in a 1–1 draw. Lalhmangaihkima played his third match of the season for Aizawl against Chennai City FC in the return leg on 17 December 2019 which ended in a goalless draw. Lalhmangaihkima was consecutively used as a substitute for a streak of 5 matches until he makes it to the starting lineup against the Kolkata Giants, Mohun Bagan on 30 November 2019 which ended 0-0. Lalhmangaihkima lost his first game with Aizawl against NEROCA F.C. on 6 December 2019. Lalhmangaihkima was benched for the next match against Indian Arrows on 9 December 2019. He made his second breakthrough to the starting lineup against Real Kashmir on 29 February 2020 which was drawn 2-2. Lalhmangaihkima started for next match against Mohun Bagan on 10 March 2020 in the return leg of the season which ended up 1–0 in favour of Mohun Bagan. Lalhmangaihkima played his last game of the season on 7 February 2020 against East Bengal by coming onto to the game during the injury time. The match ended up 1–0 in favour of Aizawl. Lalhmangaihkima made nine appearances for the club in the 2019-20 I-League season.

Lalhmangaihkima played his only match of the 2020-21 I-League season against Chennai City FC as a substitute for Alfred Jaryan on 20 March 2021, which they won 1–3.

On 3 September 2021, he signed a contract extension with the club along with eight other players, ahead of the 2021–22 I-League season.

== Career statistics ==
=== Club ===
As of 9 April 2022

Club	Season	League			Cup		AFC		Total	
Club	Season	Division	Apps	Goals	Apps	Goals	Apps	Goals	Apps	Goals
Aizawl	2018–19	I-League	2	0	0	0	–		2	0
Aizawl	2019–20	I-League	9	0	0	0	–		9	0
Aizawl	2020–21	I-League	2	0	0	0	–		2	0
Aizawl	2021–22	I-League	2	0	0	0	–		2	0
Career total			15	0	0	0	0	0	15	0
