= 2016–17 Mizoram Premier League =

Mizoram Premier League
- Season: 2016–17
- Champions: Chanmari (2nd title)

The 2016–17 Mizoram Premier League was the fifth season of the Mizoram Premier League, the top-division football league in the Indian state of Mizoram. The league began on 1 September 2016 with eight teams competing. The league final took place on 16 December with Chanmari defeating Bethlehem VT 3–0.

Aizawl were the defending champions coming into the season.

== Teams ==
- Aizawl
- BVT
- Chanmari
- Chanmari West
- Chhinga Veng
- Dinthar
- Ramhlun North
- Zo United

== League table ==
Pos	Team	Pld	W	D	L	GF	GA	GD	Pts	Qualification or relegation
1	BVT	14	8	3	3	15	12	+3	27	Advance to Semi-finals
2	Chanmari	14	7	5	2	24	13	+11	26	Advance to Semi-finals
3	Aizawl	14	7	3	4	15	10	+5	24	Advance to Semi-finals
4	Chanmari West	14	6	3	5	20	15	+5	21	Advance to Semi-finals
5	Chhinga Veng	14	4	4	6	18	19	−1	16	
6	Dinthar	14	3	7	4	16	20	−4	16	
7	Ramhlun North	14	3	3	8	12	21	−9	12	Relegation play-offs
8	Zo United	14	1	6	7	13	23	−10	9	Relegation to the Mizoram First Division

Updated to match(es) played on 26 November 2016. Source:
Rules for classification: 1) Points; 2) Goal difference; 3) Goals scored

== Finals ==
=== Bracket ===
Semi-Finals
1	Bethlehem VT	1	1	2
4	Chanmari West	1	0	1
2	Chanmari	4	2	6
3	Aizawl	1	1	2

Finals
1	Bethlehem VT	0
2	Chanmari	3

=== Semi-finals ===
==== Leg 1 ====
1 December 2016	Bethlehem VT	1–1	Chanmari West
	Lalrammuanpuia 5'	Report	Laldampuia 8'

2 December 2016	Chanmari	4–1	Aizawl
	Chhangte 3'; Zote 11'; Rohmingthanga 22' OG; Lalrinchhana 49'	Report	Hnamte 21'

==== Leg 2 ====
8 December 2016	Chanmari West	0–1	Bethlehem VT
		Report	Apuia

9 December 2016	Aizawl	1–2	Chanmari
		Report

=== Final ===
16 December 2016	Bethlehem VT	0–3	Chanmari	Aizawl
		Report	Umunnakwe 32'; Chhangte 55'; Malsawmtluanga 90+2'	Stadium: Lammual Stadium

== Awards ==
After the league final, the following awards and respective winners were announced:

Award	Player/Club
Best player	(India) Malsawmfela
Golden boot	(India) Laldampuia Tochhawng
Best forward	(India) Malsawmfela
Best midfielder	(India) Lalruatfela Zote
Best defender	(India) Lalhlimpuia
Best goalkeeper	(India) Malsawmdawngzela
