= Richard Kasagga =

Ugandan footballer (born 1993)

Personal information
- Full name: Richard Juuko Kassaga
- Date of birth: 4 July 1993 (age 33)
- Place of birth: Lyantonde, Uganda
- Height: 1.88 m (6 ft 2 in)
- Position: Centre-back

Youth career
- 2008–2013: KCC FC

Senior career*
Years	Team	Apps	(Gls)
2013–2014	Kiira Young		
2014–2016	Salam Zgharta	20	(1)
2016	KCCA	4	(0)
2017–2018	URA	15	(0)
2018–2021	Aizawl	26	(1)
2022–2023	Olympique Béja	36	(3)

International career^{‡}
2013–	Uganda	27	(0)
- * Club domestic league appearances and goals as of 21:29, 29 May 2023 (UTC) ‡ National team caps and goals as of 27 January 2016

Richard Juuko Kasagga (born 4 July 1993) is a Ugandan professional footballer who plays as a defender for the Uganda national team.

== Club career ==
=== Earlier career ===
Kasagga began his senior club career in Uganda Premier League side Kiira Young FC in 2013 where he played until 2015.

=== Salam Zgharta ===
He later moved to Lebanese Premier League club Salam Zgharta and appeared in 20 league matches, scoring 1 goal. He has also played in 7 AFC Cup games for the Lebanese outfit.

=== Back to Uganda ===
In 2016, he signed with Ugandan heavyweights Kampala City Authority where he played for two seasons before moving to Uganda Revenue Authority SC. Kasagga appeared in Uganda Premier League with URA from 2017 to 2018.

=== Aizawl FC ===
Kasagga made his debut in India, playing for Aizawl in the I-League in 2018–19 season. He appeared in 10 league matches in that season. In 2020, he renewed his contract with the Mizoram-based side. He played 13 matches in the 2019–20 season and 3 matches in 2020–21 season. On 24 January 2021, he scored his first goal for Aizawl against Indian Arrows in a 1–1 draw match.

== International career ==
Kasagga debuted for Uganda national football team on 13 July 2013 against Tanzania in a 2014 African Nations Championship second round match.

In January 2014, coach Milutin Sredojević, invited him to be included in the Uganda national football team for the 2014 African Nations Championship. The team placed third in the group stage of the competition after beating Burkina Faso, drawing with Zimbabwe and losing to Morocco.

He represented his country for 37 times including matches in bigger competitions like 2016 African Nations Championship and CECAFA Senior Challenge Cup.

== Personal life ==
Kasagga was born in Lyantonde and besides football, he has competed B.Sc. in Construction Management from Makerere University.

== Career statistics ==
=== Club ===
As of 29 May 2022

Club	Season	League			Cup		Continental		Total	
Club	Season	Division	Apps	Goals	Apps	Goals	Apps	Goals	Apps	Goal
Salam Zgharta	2014–15	Lebanese Premier League	11	1	0	0	7 (Note: Appearance(s) in AFC Cup)	0	18	1
Salam Zgharta	2015–16	Lebanese Premier League	9	0	0	0	–		9	0
Salam Zgharta	Salam Zgharta total		20	1	0	0	7	0	27	1
Aizawl	2018–19	I-League	10	0	0	0	–		10	0
Aizawl	2019–20	I-League	13	0	0	0	–		13	0
Aizawl	2020–21	I-League	3	1	0	0	–		3	1
Aizawl	Aizawl total		26	1	0	0	0	0	26	1
Olympique Béja	2021–22	Tunisian Ligue 1	12	1	0	0	–		12	1
Career total			58	3	0	0	7	0	65	3

=== International ===
As of matches played till 27 January 2016

National team	Year	Apps	Goals
Uganda	2013	10	0
Uganda	2014	7	0
Uganda	2015	7	0
Uganda	2016	3	0
Total		27	0

== Honours ==
Kampala Capital City

- Uganda Premier League: 2015–16

Aizawl

- Mizoram Premier League: 2019–20
