= Lalbiakhlua =

Indian footballer

Personal information
- Full name: Biaktea Lalbiakhlua
- Date of birth: 11 August 1988 (age 38)
- Place of birth: Mizoram, India
- Position: Midfielder

Team information
- Current team: Aizawl (on loan from Mizoram Police)
- Number: 14

Senior career*
Years	Team	Apps	(Gls)
2012–2014	Dinthar		
2015–	Mizoram Police		
2015–	→ Aizawl (loan)	5	(0)
- * Club domestic league appearances and goals as of 12 March 2016

Biaktea Lalbiakhlua (born 11 August 1988) is an Indian professional footballer who plays as a midfielder for Aizawl in the I-League on loan from Mizoram Police.

== Career ==
Born in Mizoram, Lalbiakhlua started his career with Dinthar of the Mizoram Premier League before joining Mizoram Police. While with Mizoram Police, he represented Mizoram in the winning Santosh Trophy side in 2014. Lalbiakhlua joined the newly promoted I-League side, Aizawl, in the summer of 2015 on a season-long loan.

He made his professional debut for Aizawl on 16 January 2016 against Bengaluru FC. He started the match and played 79 minutes as Aizawl lost 0–1.

== Career statistics ==
As of 12 March 2016

Club	Season	League			League Cup		Domestic Cup		Continental		Total	
Club	Season	Division	Apps	Goals	Apps	Goals	Apps	Goals	Apps	Goals	Apps	Goals
Aizawl	2015–16	I-League	5	0	—	—	0	0	—	—	5	0
Career total			5	0	0	0	0	0	0	0	5	0
