= R. Malsawmtluanga =

Indian footballer

R Malsawmtluanga
Personal information
- Date of birth: 12 September 1992 (age 34)
- Place of birth: Mizoram, India
- Height: 1.71 m (5 ft 7 1/2 in)
- Position: Midfielder

Team information
- Current team: Aizawl
- Number: 23

Senior career*
Years	Team	Apps	(Gls)
2015–2016	Aizawl	8	(1)
2016–2020	Chhinga Veng	1	(0)
2020–	Aizawl	21	(3)
- * Club domestic league appearances and goals as of 19:34, 9 April 2022 (UTC)

R Malsawmtluanga (born 12 September 1992) is an Indian professional footballer who plays as a midfielder for Aizawl in the I-League.

== Career ==
Malsawmtluanga started his career for Chanmari in the Mizoram Premier League, earning player the year honours in 2014, and the Mizoram football team.

Malsawmtluanga made his professional debut for Aizawl in the I-League on 9 January 2016 against the reigning champions, Mohun Bagan. He played the full match as Aizawl lost 3–1. best player in MPL 2017

== Career statistics ==
=== Club ===
As of 9 April 2022

Club	Season	League			Cup		AFC		Total	
Club	Season	Division	Apps	Goals	Apps	Goals	Apps	Goals	Apps	Goals
Aizawl	2015–16	I-League	8	1	0	0	—		8	1
Chhinga Veng	2018–19	I-League 2nd Division	1	0	0	0	—		1	0
Aizawl	2020–21	I-League	12	3	0	0	—		12	3
Aizawl	2021–22	I-League	9	0	0	0	—		9	0
Career total			30	4	0	0	0	0	30	4
