= Luangmual FC =

Indian association football club

Luangmual
- Full name: Luangmual Football Club
- Founded: 1955; 70 years ago
- Ground: Rajiv Gandhi Stadium
- Capacity: 20,000
- Owner: Luangmual Sporting Club
- Chairman: Tv Vanlalrova
- Manager: Pu Lalhmingthanga
- League: I-League 2nd Division
- 2013: 7th, Group B Final Round: DNQ
Home colours	Away colours

Luangmual Football Club is an Indian football club from Aizawl, Mizoram. Founded in 1955, the club has always been an amateur team but in January 2012 it was announced that they were to participate in the 2012 I-League 2nd Division, the second tier of football in India.

== History ==
Luangmual FC was founded in 1955 in Aizawl, the capital of the Indian state of Mizoram and have sense participated various amateur and state tournaments.

In January 2012 they were officially certified by the All India Football Federation to participate in the I-League 2nd Division, the second tier of football in India. This move would begin a new chapter for Luangmual Football Club as they would officially become professional. After the group stage of the 2nd Division Luangmual finished in 7th place (second to last) in their group and were thus out of the promotion chase.

== Current technical staff ==
The current staff are not known as of now.

Position	Name
Manager	Pu Lalhmingthanga
Assistant manager	Tv Guite
