= Albert Zohmingmawia =

Indian footballer

Personal information
- Date of birth: 9 January 1991 (age 35)
- Place of birth: Mizoram, India
- Position: Midfielder

Team information
- Current team: Aizawl
- Number: 11

Senior career*
Years	Team	Apps	(Gls)
2016–	Aizawl	32	(1)
- * Club domestic league appearances and goals as of 2 March 2018

Albert Zohmingmawia (born 9 January 1991) is an Indian professional footballer who plays as a midfielder for Aizawl in the I-League.

== Career ==
Born in Mizoram, Zohmingmawia played for Aizawl in the I-League 2nd Division and Mizoram Premier League. He was also a part of the Mizoram side that won the football competition during the 2015 National Games.

Zohmingmawia made his professional debut for Aizawl in the I-League on 9 January 2016 against the reigning champions, Mohun Bagan. He played the full match as Aizawl lost 3–1.

== I-League statistics ==
As of 2 March 2018

Club	Season	League			League Cup		Domestic Cup		International		Total	
Club	Season	Division	Apps	Goals	Apps	Goals	Apps	Goals	Apps	Goals	Apps	Goals
Aizawl	2015–16	I-League	14	1	—	—	0	0	—	—	14	1
Aizawl	2016–17	I-League	8	0	—	—	0	0	—	—	8	0
Aizawl	2017–18	I-League	10	0	—	—	0	0	1	0	11	0
Career total			32	1	0	0	0	0	1	0	33	1
