= Mizoram Public Service Commission =

State government agency

- MPSC

Constitutional body overview
- Formed: 30 April 1991; 34 years ago
- Jurisdiction: Government of Mizoram
- Headquarters: Mizoram New Capital Complex, Khatla, Aizawl
- Constitutional body executive: R. Lalramnghaka, (Chairman) K. Lalhmingliana (Member) K. Lalrinkima (Additional Secretary) James Lalrinchhana (Examination controller)
- Website: mpsc.mizoram.gov.in

The Mizoram Public Service Commission (MPSC) is a government body of the state of Mizoram, established by the provisions of the Constitution of India, responsible for recruiting candidates for various state government jobs through competitive examinations.

== History ==
The Mizoram became a full-fledged state on 20 February 1987. As per the Article 315 of the Constitution of India each state of India required to have its own Public Service Commission. In 1991 after four long years of statehood MPSC came into existence. S.R Vala an Indian Administrative Service officer was the first Chairman of MPSC.

== Commission profile ==
The commission is headed by a chairman and members for specific roles. MPSC members are appointed or removed by the state governor.

Name	Designation
R. Lalramnghaka	Chairman
K. Lalhmingliana	Member
K. Lalrinkima	Additional Secretary
James Lalrinchhana	Controller of Examination
