= Mizoram Armed Police =

Mizoram Armed Police (MAP) is a Special Unit in the Police Department and one of India's State Armed Police Forces of Ministry of Home in the State of Mizoram, India. At present it comprises 3 Battalions with an additional 3 Indian Reserve Battalions. Each Battalion is Commanded by a Commandant (rank of Senior Superintendent of Police) with other officers.

== The 1st Battalion Mizoram Armed Police ==
The First Battalion of Mizoram Armed Police was constituted on 1 August 1973 by drafting personnel from the then District Armed Branch of the erstwhile Lushai Hills District of Assam State. The main purpose was to meet the permanent and regular requirements of the Armed Police of the newly created Mizoram Union Territory. This unit covers duties in the district as the Armed Reserve Force, like permanent guards and other permanent duties, escort duty for the Treasury, VIPs, and prisoners. The 1st Battalion therefore performed dual functions as both the District Armed Branch and the State Armed Reserve since its inception. The 1st Battalion catered to the armed police needs of Mizoram single-handedly for fifteen years before other battalions were raised. That period included the year of turmoil that Mizoram had undergone due to disturbances.

== The 2nd Battalion Mizoram Armed Police ==
The establishment of 2nd Battalion was started with a strength of two companies in the year 1982 vide letter No. A.12028/1/82-HMP dt. 23.12.1982 from Home Department Government of Mizoram. Four more companies were created and sanctioned vide letter No.A.12028/1/92-HMP dt. 9.10.1987 from Home Department Government of Mizoram and the establishment of a full-fledged 2nd Battalion began on that same date. The two companies of 2nd Battalion were functioning from 1st Battalion headquarters, Aizawl for four years, and following the sanction of full-fledged 2nd Battalion, it was shifted to Lunglei on 27.4.1988. The Office of SDPO Lunglei was temporarily utilized as the Main Office of 2nd Battalion, until it was shifted to 2nd Battalion headquarters, Luangmual on 6.3.1989.

== The 3rd Battalion Mizoram Armed Police ==
The Government of Mizoram notification A.12028/2/88-HMP Dt. 9.1.1991 and A-12028/2/88-HMP dt. 21.11.1991 paved the way for creation of what came to be known as 4Coy Cell, under the leadership of an Asst. Commandant with a handful of staff. It has functioned since 2.2.91 at 1st Battalion complex under the direct supervision of AIG-II. In the 1st week of December 1991 its Office was shifted to Police Headquarters. On 23.9.92 the Govt. of Mizoram Home Department vide its order No. 12023/4/92-HMA sanctioned a post of Commandant. Pu. L.H. Shanliana, MPS was appointed its 1st Commandant on 9.11.92 as 4Coy Cell transitioned into another full-fledged Battalion known as the 3rd Battalion . On 10.11.92, the Office was shifted from PHQ to Mualpui, occupying an area of 286377 sq. m. The Revenue Department vide its letter No. 15016/106/91-DTE(Rev) dt. 15.9.95 accorded a proper pass No. 169 of 1976.

=== The 1st Indian Reserve Battalion ===
The 1st Indian Reserve Battalion for Mizoram was approved and sanctioned by the government of India, Ministry of Home Affairs, New Delhi vide Memo No.II.27011.3.91-FP.III dated New Delhi, the 11.6.1993 and various posts were subsequently created by the Govt. Indo ila..

=== The 2nd Indian Reserve Battalion ===
The 2nd Indian Reserve Battalion was created on 15 January 2001, with plans for its headquarters at Khawzawl. Because the site was not yet fully developed, the unit was allowed to function temporarily out of Police Headquarters Khatla, Aizawl with the bulk of its forces stationed at 3rd MAP Battalion Complex, Mualpui, Aizawl. In the meantime, construction of about 26 different buildings including living quarters and other support facilities were commenced at Khawzawl. Upon completion of the newest site in early 2005 and with the approval of Police Headquarters Khatla, this battalion headquarters was shifted to Khawzawl during the month of April 2005 and an Inaugural Function was held on 28 April 2005.

== Location ==
The Headquarters Khawzawl is perched on a hilltop, on the Eastern side of Mizoram, along the Aizawl-Champhai road, about 157 km away from Aizawl at 93.10 latitude and 23.10 degree longitude in the global positioning. The altimeter reading at the highest point is 1187 meter from the sea level. The town has good communication link i.e. Aizawl-Champhai road passes through the town As per the weatherman's record, the climate is 30 degree at the maximum (86 degrees Fahrenheit) and 4.5 degree minimum (approx. 40 degrees Fahrenheit) in the Celsius. Approximate annual rainfall is 1751mm.

== Weapons ==
All the equipment for the Mizoram Police are manufactured indigenously by the Indian Ordnance Factories controlled by the Ordnance Factories Board, Ministry of Defence, Government of India.

Name	Country of origin	Type
Glock 17	Austria	Semi-automatic pistol
Pistol Auto 9mm 1A	India	Semi-automatic pistol
Beretta 92S	Italy	Semi-automatic pistol
CornerShot	Israel	Weapon accessory
Benelli M1	Italy	Shotgun
Benelli M3	Italy	Shotgun
Heckler & Koch MP5	Germany	Submachine gun
Sterling SMG	India	Submachine gun
INSAS	India	Assault rifle
FN FAL	India	Assault rifle
M4 Carbine	United States	Assault rifle
AK 47	Bulgaria	Assault rifle
AKM	Soviet Union	Assault rifle
Type 56	China	Assault rifle
Heckler & Koch G3	Germany	Assault rifle
M16 rifle	United States	Assault rifle
Dragunov sniper rifle	Soviet Union	Sniper rifle
Bren LMG	India	Light machine gun

Apart from this, Mizoram Armed Police also use a large number of firearms captured from militants.
