= Malsawmfela =

Indian footballer (born 1993)

Personal information
- Full name: Malsawmfela Fanchun
- Date of birth: 3 September 1993 (age 33)
- Place of birth: Aizawl, Mizoram, India
- Height: 1.69 m (5 ft 6 1/2 in)
- Position: Forward

Team information
- Current team: Aizawl

Youth career
- Mohun Bagan
- 2009–2010: Salgaocar

Senior career*
Years	Team	Apps	(Gls)
2010–2013	Pailan Arrows	17	(3)
2013–	Aizawl		
2018	Chanmari		
2017	→ Chennai City FC (loan)		

International career
2008	India U16	2	(0)
2009	India U19	5	(4)
2010	India U23	3	(1)
- * Club domestic league appearances and goals

Malsawmfela Fanchun (born 3 September 1993 in Aizawl, Mizoram) is an Indian footballer who plays as a forward for Aizawl F.C. in the Mizoram Premier League.

== Club career ==
=== Pailan Arrows ===
After impressing on tour with the India U16 team in England Malsawmfela was signed by Salgaocar of the I-League. However, after not playing for the club in the 2009–10 I-League season Malsawmfela signed for Pailan Arrows (the AIFF XI) who were a new team whose goal was to create a batch of players that would be able to qualify India for the 2018 World Cup in Russia. He scored his first goal for the club on 30 December 2012 against Hindustan Aeronautics Limited S.C. in the 33rd minute to give Pailan a 2–1 victory. He then scored his second goal of the season against Mumbai F.C. on 15 January 2011 in the 9th minute to give Pailan the lead 1–0 but a 95th-minute goal from Ebi Sukore meant that Pailan had to settle for a 1–1 draw. He then scored his third goal on 3 April 2011 against HAL SC again at the Bangalore Football Stadium in the 80th minute as Pailan routed HAL 4–0.

While with Arrows, he was loaned out to I-League 2nd Division side DSK Shivajians for the 2013 I-League 2nd Division season.

== International career ==
Malsawmfela started his international career at the under-16 level in 2008 when the under-16 team went out for a camp in the United States and England. The tour of the United States was set up in Charleston, West Virginia where after 25 days of training the India U16 team won six out of the seven match-ups with Malsawmfela coming out as the top-scorer among the other India U16 players with 16 goals. Then in September 2008 the India U16 team started to tour England where they took on the under-16 teams of Everton and Manchester United. In the match against Everton, when India U16s where down 1–0, Malsawmfela scored the equaliser before Everton scored another to result in India U16s losing 2–1. Then when the India U16 team took on Manchester United's under-16 team Malsawmfela scored the opening goal in the 5th minute to give India U16s an early lead before Manchester United U16s took the lead 2–1 into halftime. However Malsawmfela scored the equaliser for India's U16s in the 2nd half as India's U16s went on to draw the match 3–3.

Malsawmfela then made his debut at the under-19s level on 5 November 2009 during the 2010 AFC U-19 Championship qualification against Iraq's U19s where India's U19s lost the match 5–0. Malsawmfela then scored a brace for the India under-19s on 12 November 2009 against Afghanistan U19s in the 48th and 67th minutes of the game as India's U19s went on to win the match 4–1. He then scored a brace in India under-19s next match against Kuwait on 15 November 2009 in the 45th and 56th minutes of the match to give India's under-19s a 3–0 victory. Malsawmfela then rose up the India national levels, when he made his debut for India at the under-23 level during the 2010 Asian Games in South Korea on 7 November 2010 against Kuwait when he came on as a 72nd-minute substitute for Jeje Lalpekhlua as India U23s lost the match 2–0.

Malsawmfela then scored his first goal for India at the under-23 level on 23 February 2011 against Myanmar U23s during the first round of the 2012 Olympic qualifiers where India's U23s won 2–1.

== Career statistics ==
=== Club ===
Statistics accurate as of 26 December 2012

Club	Season	League		Federation Cup		Durand Cup		AFC		Total	
Club	Season	Apps	Goals	Apps	Goals	Apps	Goals	Apps	Goals	Apps	Goals
Pailan Arrows	2010–11	10	3	0	0	0	0	—	—	10	3
Pailan Arrows	2011–12	4	0	0	0	0	0	—	—	4	0
Pailan Arrows	2012–13	3	0	0	0	0	0	—	—	3	0
Career total		17	3	0	0	0	0	0	0	17	3
