= Chawnpui FC =

Indian association football club based in Aizawl

Chawnpui
- Full name: Chawnpui Football Club
- Founded: 1995; 31 years ago
- Ground: Rajiv Gandhi Stadium
- Capacity: 20,000
- Chairman: Er.C.Malsawma
- Head coach: Lalrindika Hmar
- League: Mizoram Premier League
Home colours	Away colours

Chawnpui Football Club is an Indian professional football club based in Aizawl, Mizoram, that competes in the Mizoram Premier League. Chawnpui FC won the Mizoram Premier League, the first division of Mizoram football in 2022, by beating FC Venghnuai.

== History ==
Chawnpui FC was established in 1995. Chawnpui FC was promoted to Mizoram Premier League in Season 7 [2018-2019] after they were champion in Aizawl District Football Association First Division league competition. They are the current champions of Mizoram Premier League, having lifted the cup in MPL season 9.

== Stadium ==
Rajiv Gandhi Stadium, located in Salem Veng, Aizawl, Mizoram, is used as the home ground of Chawnpui Veng FC for the home matches of Mizoram Premier League.

== Current technical staff ==
Position	Name
Head coach	(India) Lalrindika Hmar
Assistant coach	(India)
Team manager	(India) Hmingthanzauva
Physiotherapist	(India)

== Honours ==
=== Domestic ===
==== League ====
- Mizoram Premier League
  - Winners (1): Mizoram Premier League season 9 [2022-2023] - Champions
- Under-21 Reliance Foundation Development League 2023 Mizoram Region
  - Champion/Winner 2023
- Gospel Centenary Cup for 2nd Division Clubs Mizoram
  - Champion/Winner 1994 (Participated as Chawnpui Games&Sports Association-CG&SA)
