= Mizoram Police =

Law enforcing agency of the state of Mizoram in India

- Emblem of the Mizoram Police.
- Abbreviation: MRP

Jurisdictional structure
- Operations jurisdiction: Mizoram, IN
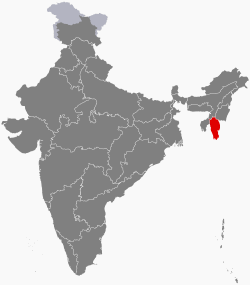
- Jurisdiction
- Governing body: Home Ministry, Government of Mizoram
- General nature: Local civilian police

Operational structure
- Headquarters: PHQ, Khatla, Aizawl, Mizoram
- Agency executive: Sharad Agarwal, IPS, DGP
- Parent agency: Home Department, Govt. of Mizoram

Notables
- Person: K. Sapdanga, Home Minister

Website
- police.mizoram.gov.in

The Mizoram Police Force is the law enforcing agency of the state of Mizoram, India.

== Insignia/Ranks of Mizoram Police ==
State Police Services rank insignia
Insignia

Rank

Superintendent of police (Note: In an armed police battalion, the equivalent rank is "Commandant.)
Additional superintendent of police (Note: In an armed police battalion, the equivalent rank is Deputy Commandant)
Deputy superintendent of police (Note: In an armed police battalion, the equivalent rank is Assistant Commandant.)

Abbreviation

SP
Addl.SP
DSP/Dy.SP

- Note: Gazetted officers in State Police Services (SPS) begins from DSP and above.
- In the Indian Police Service (IPS), rank starts from Assistant Superintendent of Police (ASP), which is equivalent to DSP in state services.

== Ranges ==
Mizoram Police has Three Police Ranges Namely Northern, Southern and Eastern Ranges, which are headed by a Deputy Inspector General of Police Northern, Southern and Eastern respectively.

Ranges	Districts	DIGP	Station
Northern Range	Aizawl District, Kolasib District, Mamit District,	Rodingliana Chawngthu, IPS	Aizawl
Southern Range	Lunglei district, Lawngtlai District, Siaha District and Hnahthial District	Altaf Ahmad Khan, IPS	Lunglei
Eastern Range	Champhai District, Khawzawl District, Saitual District and Serchhip District	Rohit Meena, IPS	Aizawl

== Training and development ==
Mizoram Police has two (2) Training Centres. The two training centres are at Mualvum and Thenzawl. Currently, Police Training Centre Thenzawl is the active training centre for its general employees. Officer cadres are sent for training at North East Police Academy (NEPA).

General Basic training courses are for nine (9) months.

Mizoram Police, under Police Modernization Scheme, runs Crime and Criminal Tracking Network & Systems which links every Police station in Mizoram through Wide Area Network (WAN).

== Forensic Science Department ==
Government of Mizoram established Forensic Science Laboratory under the administrative control of Police Department Vide Notification No. A/12034/1/97-HMP dated 31/7/2000. Forensic Science Laboratory, Mizoram started functioning initially with only one division i.e. chemistry, Mizoram FSL now have 8(eight) divisions viz. Chemistry, Questioned Document, Ballistics & Toolmarks, Fingerprint, Photography, DNA/Serology, Toxicology and Cyber Forensics, and headed by Director rank Forensic Scientist. The Laboratory was upgraded to a full-fledged Directorate in March, 2015 which is in par with the guidelines of National Human Rights Commission.

== Vehicles ==
Vehicle	Country of origin	Type	Notes	Picture
Tata Sumo Victa	Republic of India	Patrol Car	Used by City Police Patrol	
Maruti Gypsy	Republic of India	Patrol Car	Used by Multiple	
Renault Duster	France	Officers	Used by G.O.s	
Mahindra Bolero	Republic of India	Police car	Used by Multiple	
Tata Yodha	Republic of India	Patrol Car		
Tata Telcoline	Republic of India	Riot Vehicle	Used by MAP and MRP Riot Police	
Tata 407 Tow Truck	Republic of India	Tow Truck	Used by the Traffic Department	
Tata Sumo Armoured	Republic of India	Special	Used by Escorts and Special Units	
Royal Enfield Electra 350	Republic of India	Patrol Bike	Used by Traffic Police Department	
Suzuki Gixxer 250	Japan	Patrol Bike	Used by Traffic Department-	
Mahindra Bolero Pikup	Republic of India	Police car	Used by Multiple	
Tata Xenon	Republic of India	Police car	Used by Multiple	

== Weapons ==
Name	Country of origin	Type	Users
Pistol Auto 9mm 1A	India	Semi-automatic pistol	City Police, Mizoram Armed Police, VIP Security
Glock 19	Austria	Semi-automatic pistol	City Police, Mizoram Armed Police, VIP Security and Commandos
Beretta PX4 Storm	Italy	Semi-automatic pistol	Mizoram Armed Police, VIP Security and Commandos
Sterling SMG	United Kingdom	Submachine gun	Mizoram Armed Police, VIP Security and Commandos
Heckler & Koch MP5	Germany	Submachine gun	Mizoram Armed Police, VIP Security and Commandos
Brügger & Thomet MP9	Switzerland	Submachine gun	Mizoram Armed Police, VIP Security and Commandos
INSAS rifle	India	Rifle	Mizoram Armed Police
L1A1 SLR	India	Rifle	Mizoram Armed Police
AK-47	Soviet Union	Rifle	Mizoram Armed Police, VIP Security and Commandos
AKM	Soviet Union	Rifle	Mizoram Armed Police, VIP Security and Commandos
AKMS	Soviet Union	Rifle	Mizoram Armed Police, VIP Security and Commandos
AK103	Russia	Rifle	Mizoram Armed Police, VIP Security and Commandos
M4 carbine	United States	Rifle	VIP Security and Commandos
Brügger & Thomet APR	Switzerland	Rifle	Mizoram Armed Police and Commandos
Bren LMG	United Kingdom	Squad Automatic Weapon	Mizoram Armed Police

== Recruitments ==
Entries are done at the following ranks:
1. Constables / Lady constables, Sub Inspectors and Lady Sub inspectors: Appointment done through Mizoram Police Recruitment Board.
2. Mizoram Police Service: Officers selected through Mizoram Public Service Commission (Group-A) etc. Examination conducted by Mizoram Public Service Commission are appointed as Deputy Superintendents of Police or higher.
4. Indian Police Service: Officers selected through Civil Service Examinations conducted by Union Public Service Commission are appointed as Deputy Superintendent of Police or higher (up to DGP).
