= Alfred Jaryan =

Liberian footballer

Personal information
- Full name: Alfred Kemah Jaryan
- Date of birth: 24 September 1988 (age 38)
- Place of birth: Paynesville, Liberia
- Position: Midfielder

Senior career*
Years	Team	Apps	(Gls)
2010–2013	Mohammedan		
2013–2014	Mumbai	8	(2)
2014–2015	Mohammedan		
2015–2016	Aizawl	96	(3)
2016–2017	Tollygunge		
2017–2021	Aizawl	92	(1)
2021	Aryan		
2021–2022	Aizawl		
2022	Ageya Chalo Sangha FC		
- * Club domestic league appearances and goals

Alfred Kemah Jaryan (born 24 September 1988) is a Liberian professional footballer who plays as a midfielder.

== Club career ==
=== Mohammedan ===
In 2010, Alfred moved to India and signed with Mohammedan Sporting and appeared in the I-League.

=== Mumbai ===
Alfred scored a goal in 2–1 victory against Shillong Lajong in 2013–14 I-League. He scored an equalizer against Dempo in 88th minute to earn a point for his team.

=== Aizawl ===
Alfred then signed for newly promoted Aizawl FC for the 2016 edition of the Hero I-League. He scored in the third match against DSK Shivajians FC at home. Jaryan has all-time most appearances for Aizawl. He also won Mizoram Premier League with club.

== International career ==
Following his impressive I-league campaign with Aizawl FC, Jaryan was called up to the national squad for the Africa Cup of Nations qualifying match against Zimbabwe on 11 June 2017. He did not appear in the 3–0 defeat.

== Career statistics ==
=== Club ===
As of 1 May 2021

Club	Season	League			Cup		Continental		Total	
Club	Season	Division	Apps	Goals	Apps	Goals	Apps	Goals	Apps	Goals
Mumbai	2013–14	I-League	8	2	0	0	—		8	2
Aizawl	2015–16	I-League	16	2	1 (Note: Appearances in the Super Cup)	0	—		17	2
Aizawl	2016–17	I-League	17	0	3	0	—		20	0
Aizawl	2017–18	I-League	17	0	2	0	7 (Note: Appearances in the AFC Champions League) (Note: Appearances in the AFC Cup)	0	26	0
Aizawl	2018–19	I-League	17	0	0	0	—		17	0
Aizawl	2019–20	I-League	15	0	0	0	—		15	0
Aizawl	2020–21	I-League	14	1	0	0	—		14	1

== Honors ==
Aizawl

- I-League: Champions: 2016–17
- Mizoram Premier League: Champions: 2015–16, 2018–19

Individual

- Best Forward of the FAO League: 2011
- Best Midfielder I-League: 2016–17
