= Lammual Stadium =

Football stadium in Mizoram, India

Coordinates: 23.729°N 92.718°E

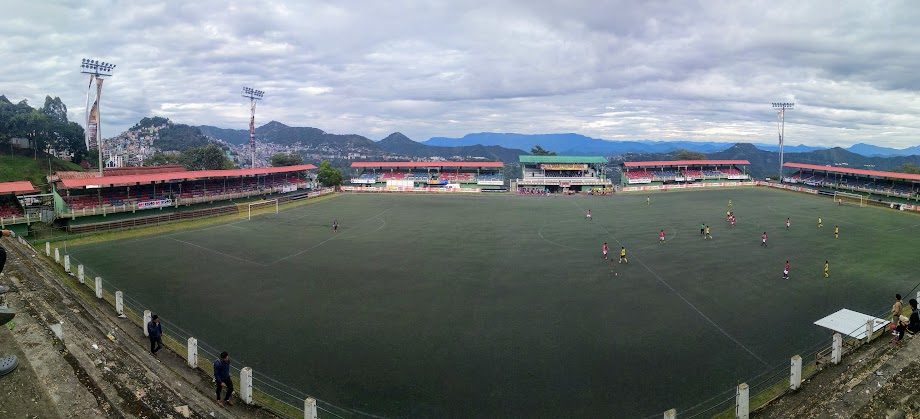
- Panoramic view of the stadium
- Interactive map of Lammual Stadium
- Full name: Lammual Stadium
- Former names: Assam Rifles Ground
- Location: Aizawl, Mizoram, India
- Capacity: 5,000
- Surface: Astroturf

Construction
- Built: 1928
- Renovated: 2011

Tenants
- Aizawl F.C. (2015—); Chhinga Veng F.C.(2018—)

Lammual Stadium is a football stadium located in Aizawl, Mizoram, India. It is used mainly for football matches. It was one of the venues for the Northeast Games 2012. The stadium serves as the venue for Mizoram Premier League matches.

== Stadium ==
The ground is a single tier stadium. The stadium has a seating capacity of about 5,000 spectators, which costed around 190 crores.

== History ==
Lammual was started in the 1920s due to lack of level ground in Mizoram for troops to practice and it was decided to flatten a knoll to create a Parade ground. It took 5 years of Military labor by the Silchar Military Police battalion, under the command of Captain Granville Henry Loch (1859–1929), commandant. The cost of leveling the ground at that time was Rs 1,200. When the work was completed, the parade ground had a sheer cliff of 60 feet on side and 150 feet of filling in on the other. The cliff face of this field.

== Modern ==
The stadium has a historical and cultural significance for the Mizo people. It has been used for addressing the people of Mizoram by politicians like Jawaharlal Nehru who visited Aizawl in 1965. Lammual has also been the place where a helicopter landed for the first time in Mizoram in 1962. It is the venue for Chapchar Kut festival, a festival of Mizo people. There was initially a plan to construct the Rajiv Gandhi Stadium in Lammual ground before it was shifted to Mualpui as Assam Rifle could not give clearance for construction. The Chief Minister of Mizoram, Lal Thanhawla officially inaugurated the artificial turf (grass) laid at Aizawl Lammual, also known as the Assam Rifles (AR) Ground in Aizawl city on Monday, 28 February 2011.
