= Rajiv Gandhi Stadium (Aizawl) =

Stadium in India

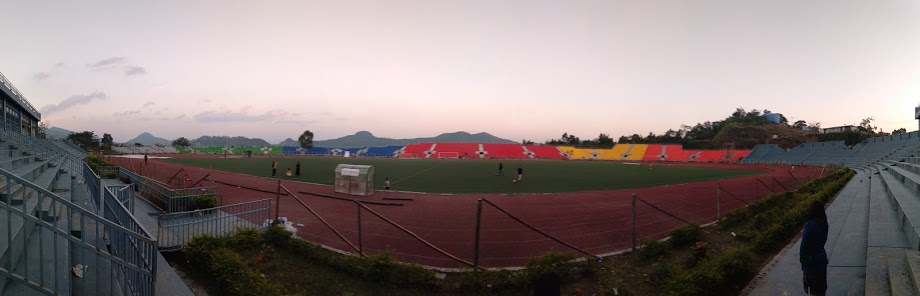
- Panoramic view of the stadium
- Interactive map of Rajiv Gandhi Stadium
- Location: Salem Veng, Aizawl
- Coordinates: 23.714281°N 92.735391°E
- Capacity: 20,000
- Surface: Astroturf
- Field size: 105.0 x 68.0 m

Tenants
- Mizoram football team Aizawl FC; Chanmari FC; Mizoram Premier League

Rajiv Gandhi Stadium is a multi-purpose stadium in Mualpui, Salem Veng, Aizawl, Mizoram, India. It is used mainly for football and athletics. This stadium is named after Rajiv Gandhi, the 6th Prime Minister of India.

== Stadium ==
The stadium is a two tier stadium. The stadium under construction will have a seating capacity of 20,000 spectators. The stadium serves as the home venue for Aizawl FC and Chanmari FC in Indian Football League matches.

== History ==
The Foundation stone for Rajiv Gandhi Stadium, Salem Veng, Mualpui, Aizawl was laid by Sonia Gandhi on 6 March 2010 in presence of Chief Minister of Mizoram, Pu Lalthanhawla. This complex was the venue for the 26th 2012 Northeast Games.
