= Chhinga Veng FC =

Indian association football club

Chhinga Veng
- Full name: Chhinga Veng Football Club
- Short name: CVFC
- Founded: 1985; 41 years ago
- Ground: Rajiv Gandhi Stadium
- Capacity: 20,000
- Head coach: Anand Gurung
- League: Mizoram Premier League
Home colours	Away colours

Chhinga Veng Football Club is an Indian professional football club based in Aizawl, Mizoram. The club competes in the Mizoram Premier League. The club made its I-League 2nd Division debut in the 2018–19 season, and finished as runners-up.

== History ==
Chhinga Veng FC was established in 1985. Chhinga Veng won the Independence Day tournament, the oldest football cup tournament in Mizoram in 2017. They followed it by winning MFA Super cup in the same year.

Chhinga Veng won the Mizoram Premier League, the first division of Mizoram football in 2017, by beating then national champion Aizawl F.C., to make it a treble. In the next season they started where they left off in the previous, by winning Independence Day tournament. and MFA Super cup 2018. Chhinga Veng finished runners–up in 2018–19 Mizoram Premier League by losing to I-League side Aizawl FC on penalties in the final.

Chhinga Veng entered the national league in 2019 by competing in 2018–19 I-League 2nd Division.

== Rivalry ==
Chhinga Veng has a rivalry with local side Chanmari FC, which also competes in Mizoram Premier League. In the regional championships, the club also nurture the rivalry with I-League giants Aizawl FC.

== Stadium ==
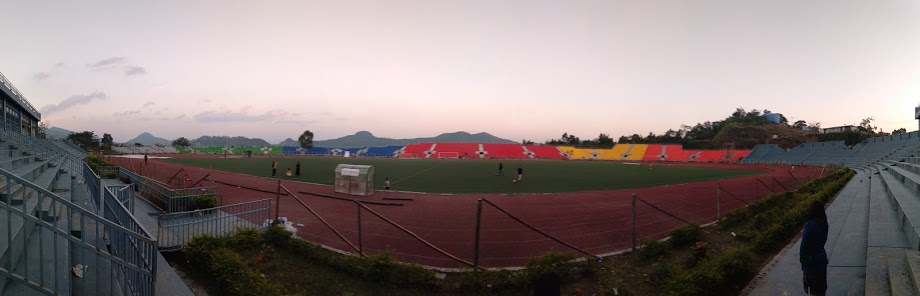
A panoramic view of the stadium

Rajiv Gandhi Stadium, located in Salem Veng, Aizawl, Mizoram, is used as the home ground of Chhinga Veng for the home matches of Mizoram Premier League.

== 2019 squad ==
As of 5 September 2019

Note: Flags indicate national team as defined under FIFA eligibility rules; some limited exceptions apply. Players may hold more than one non-FIFA nationality.

No.	Pos.	Nation	Player
1	GK	IND	Dharminder Guru
4	DF	IND	Laldinpuia PC
6	MF	IND	KC Larchhuakmawia
8	MF	IND	Silvana Ruatkima
10	MF	IND	Thasiama
11	DF	IND	Lalsawmzela
13	DF	IND	K Lalnunzama
18	DF	IND	Hmingthanmawia
19	FW	IND	Malsawmdawnga
20	MF	IND	Omega Vanlalhruaitluanga

No.	Pos.	Nation	Player
23	MF	IND	F Zosangliana
27	DF	IND	Lalmuanawma
29	FW	IND	Malsawmzuala MC
30	MF	IND	Ginkholen Haokip
32	GK	IND	Lalruatpuia
34	DF	IND	Vanlalzuidika
35	DF	IND	Lalthlalova
73	DF	IND	Lalremruata
77	DF	IND	Vanlalchhuanga
99	MF	CIV	Sie Ouattara

== Kit manufacturers and shirt sponsors ==
Period	Kit manufacturer	Shirt sponsor
2018—present		

== Current technical staff ==
As of 11 January 2019

Position	Name
Head coach	(India) Anand Gurung
Assistant coach	(India) H. Lalremruata
Team manager	(India) Lalrinnunga Khawlhring
Physiotherapist	(India) Lalrinsanga Rokhum

== Team records ==
=== National/International record ===
Season	Division	Teams	Position	Attendance/G	Federation Cup/Super Cup	AFC Champions League	AFC Cup
2018–19	I-League 2nd	16	2	–	TBD	DNQ	DNQ

Key

- DNQ = did not qualify
- DNP = Did not play
- TBD = To be decided
- TBA = To be added

=== Season ===
As of 30 December 2018

Year	Division	League								League Cup	Top Scorer(s)	
Year	Division	Pos.	P	W	D	L	GF	GA	Pts	League Cup	Player(s)	Goals
2018–19	2	TBD	0	0	0	0	0	0	0	TBD	TBD	TBD

=== Head coach's record ===
updated on 13 September 2019

Name	Nationality	From	To	P	W	D	L	Win%
Danny Lalduhawma	India	2018	Present	16	10	3	3	62.50
Anand Gurung	India	2018	2019	0	0	0	0	—

== Honours ==
=== Domestic ===
==== League ====
- I-League 2nd Division
  - Runners-up (1): 2018–19
- Mizoram Premier League
  - Winners (1): 2017–18
  - Runners-up (1): 2018–19

==== Cup ====
- MFA Super Cup
  - Winners (2): 2017, 2018
- Independence Day Cup
  - Winners (2): 2017, 2018
