= Mizoram Premier League =

Indian football league in the state of Mizoram

- Organising body: Mizoram Football Association
- Founded: 2012; 14 years ago
- Country: India
- Confederation: AFC
- Number of clubs: 8
- Level on pyramid: 5
- Promotion to: I-League 3
- Relegation to: Mizoram First Division
- Domestic cup: Independence Day Cup
- League cup(s): MFA Cup; MFA Super Cup
- Current champions: Chanmari (3rd title)
- Most championships: Aizawl (5 titles)
- Broadcaster: Zonet TV
- Current: 2026–27 Mizoram Premier League

The Mizoram Premier League (also known as Star Cement Mizoram Premier League for sponsorship reasons) is the highest state-level football league in Mizoram, India. On a national scale, it is the 5th tier of Indian football league system. The competition is conducted by the Mizoram Football Association, the official football body of Mizoram, with Tetea Hmar as its secretary and key promoter. The league started on 24 October 2012 for the first time.

== League structure ==
Tier	Division
1 _{(5 on Indian football Pyramid)}	Mizoram Premier League
2 _{(6 on Indian football pyramid)}	Mizoram First Division

The Mizoram Premier League has eight clubs. The four top clubs qualify for the MPL automatically, while the other 4 teams will be decided via a playoff. The top 4 teams from the play-off shall qualify for the MPL The 8 clubs playing for season 12 of MPL are Aizawl FC, Chanmari FC, Mizoram Police FC, SYS FC, MLS FC, Kanan FC, Dinthar FC and Saikhamakawn FC.

== Venues ==
The main venues of the league are Rajiv Gandhi Stadium (Aizawl) and Lammual Stadium.

== Teams (2026–27) ==
- Aizawl FC
- Chanmari
- Dinthar FC
- Kanan FC
- MLS FC
- Mizoram Police FC
- Ramthar Veng FC
- Saikhamakawn FC

== Winners ==
List of Mizoram Premier League winners
Edition	Season	Champions	Runners-up	League Winners	Ref.
1st	2012–13	Dinthar FC	Mizoram Police	Did not exist	
2nd	2013–14	Chanmari	Luangmual FC	Did not exist	
3rd	2014–15	Aizawl	Chanmari	Did not exist	
4th	2015–16	Aizawl	Chanmari	Did not exist	
5th	2016–17	Chanmari	Bethlehem VT	Did not exist	
6th	2017–18	Chhinga Veng	Aizawl	Did not exist	
7th	2018–19	Aizawl	Chhinga Veng	Did not exist	
8th	2019–20	Aizawl	Electric Veng FC	Did not exist	
9th	2022–23	Chawnpui	FC Venghnuai	Did not exist	
10th	2023–24	Mizoram Police	Chanmari	Did not exist	
11th	2024–25	Aizawl	Mizoram Police	Did not exist	
12th	2025–26	Chanmari	Aizawl	Aizawl	
13th	2026–27	Chanmari	Dinthar FC	Aizawl	

== Sponsorship ==
Season	Sponsor
2012–13	Mahindra
2013–14	Mahindra
2014–15	Samsung
2015–16	McDowell's No.1
2016–17	McDowell's No.1
2017–18	McDowell's No.1
2018–19	
2019–20	
2022–23	Zote Honda
2023–24	Zote Toyota
2024–25	LZ Juice
2025–26	GIG Motors
2026–	Star Cement

== Media coverage ==
On 14 June 2012 it was announced that the Mizoram Football Association had signed a five-year ₹ 1.25 crore deal with ZONET Cable TV Pvt. Ltd. The deal was signed by Mizoram Football Association president Lal Thanzara, while Zonet Cable TV Director R.K. Lianzuala (of Bethlehem Veng) signed for Zonet. The deal between the MFA and Zonet is one of the most lucrative sports deals in the North East of India. In 2017 it was announced the channel signed another 5 year extension with Mizoram Football Association Worth 1.5 Crores. Mizoram Premier League (MPL) season 8 has been delivered to SONY by Zonet Cable TV and streamed live on SonyLIV. MPL is the first state league to be televised on a national television platform.

== All season awards ==
=== Top scorer ===
Season	Player	Club	Goals
2012–13	MS Dawngliana	Chanmari	10
2013–14	Lalbiakhlua	Mizoram Police FC	8
2014–15	Lalbiakhlua	Mizoram Police FC	9
2015–16	F. Lalrinpuia	Aizawl	13
2016–17	Laldampuia Tochhawng	Chanmari West	11
2022–23	MC Malsawmzuala	Chawnpui FC	10
2023–24	Lalrinzuala	Aizawl	8
2024–25	Lalbiakdika	Aizawl	12
2025–26	Zomuansanga	Aizawl	18

=== Best player ===
Season	Player	Club
2012–13	R. Laldanmawia	Dinthar FC
2013–14	R. Malsawmtluanga	Chanmari
2014–15	Lalramchullova	Aizawl
2015–16	F. Lalrinpuia	Aizawl
2016–17	Malsawmfela	Chanmari
2022–23	Lalrinchhana Tochhawng	Chawnpui FC
2023–24	Lalbiakthanga Hmar	Mizoram Police FC
2024–25	Lalthankhuma	Aizawl
2025–26	T. Zothanmawia	Chanmari

=== Best goalkeeper ===
Season	Player	Club
2012–13	Lalawmpuia	Chanmari
2013–14	Lalawmpuia	Chanmari
2014–15	Lalawmpuia	Chanmari
2015–16	Lalawmpuia	Zo United
2016–17	Malsawmdawngzela	BVT FC
2022–23	F. Lalmuanawma	Mizoram Police FC
2023–24	F. Lalmuanawma	Mizoram Police FC
2024–25	Lalhriatpuia	Aizawl
2025–26	T. Zothanmawia	Chanmari

=== Best forward ===
Season	Player	Club
2012–13	F. Lalrinpuia	Mizoram Police FC
2013–14	MS Dawngliana	Chanmari
2014–15	Malsawmfela	Chanmari
2015–16	F. Lalrinpuia	Aizawl
2016–17	Malsawmfela	Chanmari
2022–23	MC Malsawmzuala	Chawnpui FC
2023–24	Lalrinzuala	Aizawl
2024–25	Lalbiakdika	Aizawl
2025–26	Zomuansanga	Aizawl

=== Best midfielder ===
Season	Player	Club
2012–13	Rohmingthanga	FC Kulikawn
2013–14	Reuben Zosangpuia	Luangmual FC
2014–15	David Lalrinmuana	Aizawl
2015–16	K. Lalthathanga	BVT FC
2016–17	Lalruatfela Zote	Chanmari
2022–23	K. Vanlalhriata	Chawnpui FC
2023–24	Lalbiakthanga Hmar	Mizoram Police FC
2024–25	Lalthankhuma	Aizawl
2025–26	Lalawmpuia Sailo	Aizawl

=== Best defender ===
Season	Player	Club
2012–13	Zothanpuia	Chanmari
2013–14	Zothanpuia	Chanmari
2014–15	Emmanuel Chigozie	Aizawl
2015–16	Lalrinchhana Tochhawng	Chanmari
2016–17	Lalhlimpuia	BVT FC
2022–23	Lalruatfela	FC Venghnuai
2023–24	F. Lalhmunmawia	Mizoram Police FC
2024–25	Kimkima	Aizawl
2025–26	Rohmingthanga	Aizawl

=== Best emerging player ===
Season	Player	Club
2025–26	F. Malsawmtluanga	Chanmari
