= Chanmari FC =

Association football club in Mizoram, India

Chanmari
- Full name: Chanmari Football Club
- Nickname: CFC
- Founded: 19 June 2011; 15 years ago
- Ground: Rajiv Gandhi Stadium
- Capacity: 20,000
- Chairman: Vanlalruatfamkima
- Head coach: Steven Dias
- League: Indian Football League
- 2025–26: Indian Football League, 6th of 10
- Website: www.chanmarifc.com
Home colours	Away colours	Third colours

Chanmari Football Club is an Indian professional football club based in Aizawl, Mizoram. They are currently competing in the Indian Football League and the Mizoram Premier League.

== History ==
Chanmari FC was founded in 2011. In May 2017, they formed a partnership with then Indian Super League club FC Pune City. As part of the association, Pune City has promised to help the Aizawl-based club build a youth structure by providing them with coaches and training equipment. This partnership would enable Chanmari to set up youth teams and thereby help local Mizoram players to train and benefit in professional environment. The club also takes part in the Mizoram Independence Day Cup. Club's youth team competed in the U19 I-League.

== Kit manufacturers and shirt sponsors ==
Period	Kit manufacturer	Shirt sponsor
2024–present	Six5six	Ather Energy

== Stadium ==
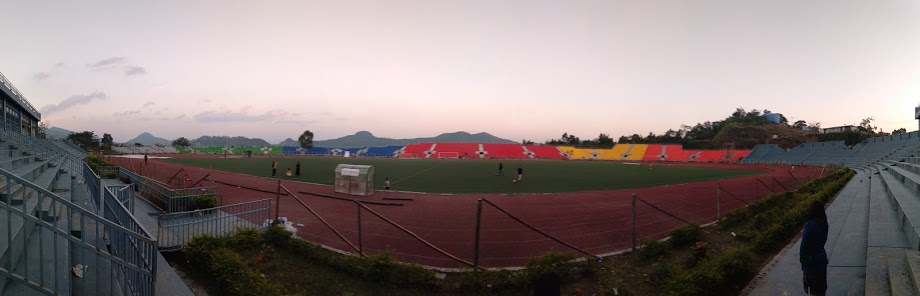
Rajiv Gandhi Stadium, the home ground of Chanmari

Chanmari FC plays its home matches at the Rajiv Gandhi Stadium, located in Salem Veng, Mualpui, Aizawl. It has artificial turf and a seating capacity of 20,000 spectators.

== Rivalries ==
=== Mizoram derby ===
In the regional championships including the Mizoram Premier League, the club nurtures rivalry with local side Aizawl FC.

== Honours ==
=== National ===
- I-League 2
  - Runners-up (1): 2024–25
- I-League 3
  - Runners-up (1): 2024–25

=== Regional ===
- Mizoram Premier League
  - Champions (3): 2013–14, 2016–17, 2025–2026
  - Runners-up (1): 2015–16, 2023–24
- Mizoram Independence Day Cup
  - Champions (1): 2013

== See also ==
- List of football clubs in India
