= 2023–24 Aizawl FC season =

Indian football club season

Aizawl
2023–24 season
- Chairman: Robert Romawia Royte
- Manager: Erol Akbay (until 4 November 2023); Malsawmzuala Sailo (5 November 2023 to 22 January 2024); Stojkoski Bobi (from 23 January 2024)
- Stadium: Rajiv Gandhi Stadium
- I-League: 9th
- Top goalscorer: League: Lalrinzuala Lalbiaknia (15 goals); All: Lalrinzuala Lalbiaknia (15 goals)
- Highest home attendance: 3,485 (v. Inter Kashi, 21 December 2023)
- Lowest home attendance: 300 (v. Churchill Brothers, 27 March 2024)
- Average home league attendance: 1,819
Home colours	Away colours

The 2023–24 season was Aizawl's 40th competitive season and its seventh competitive season in the I-League, India's top-flight professional football league. Aizawl lost the opening match of their season to Mohammedan on 29 January 2023. Their last two games of the season, to be played at home, were cancelled after their opponents TRAU and NEROCA refused to travel to Aizawl citing security concerns.

== Managerial changes ==
On 2 September 2023, the club appointed Erol Akbay as its head coach for the season. Although they have seen their head coach Erol Akbay leave after the first match against Mohammedan SC by mutual agreement. A day later, B. Malsawmzuala was appointed as interim head coach. On 23 January 2024, the club appointed Stojkoski Bobi as head coach for rest of the season.

== Technical staff ==
Position	Name
Head coach	(North Macedonia) Stojkoski Bobi
Assistant coach	(India) Malsawmzuala Sailo
Manager	(India) F. Lalrinmawia

== Squad information ==
=== First-team players ===
As of 1 June 2024

Note: Flags indicate national team as defined under FIFA eligibility rules; some limited exceptions apply. Players may hold more than one non-FIFA nationality.

No.	Pos.	Nation	Player
1	GK	IND	Vanlalhriatpuia
3	DF	IND	Supriyo Ghosh
4	DF	IND	Lalmuanawma
5	MF	BRA	Gustavo
6	MF	IND	KC Larchhuakmawia
7	FW	IND	Lalthanmawia Renthlei
8	MF	IND	Lalthankhuma
9	FW	IND	Tharpuia
10	MF	IND	K Lalrinfela
13	DF	IND	Lalchhawnkima (Captain)
14	DF	IND	Joe Zoherliana
16	DF	IND	Lalfemkima
17	MF	IND	Lalramsanga
18	FW	IND	Lalrinzuala Lalbiaknia
19	DF	IND	H Lalrempuia
20	GK	IND	Nora Fernandes
21	MF	IND	K Lalhmangaihkima
27	FW	IND	Joseph Lalvenhima
28	GK	IND	Gurmeet Singh

No.	Pos.	Nation	Player
29	FW	IND	Augustine Lalrochana
30	MF	IND	Sheikh Sahil (on loan from Jamshedpur)
32	FW	IND	Lalbiakdika
33	DF	SRB	Ivan Marić
36	DF	IND	Rohmingthanga
37	MF	IND	Aditya Saha
39	GK	IND	Joel B Lalramchhana
42	DF	IND	Laldanmawia (on loan from Hyderabad)
44	DF	IND	Lalhrezuala Sailung (on loan from Odisha)
46	MF	IND	Subhanil Ghosh
88	FW	IND	Bawlte Rohmingthanga
—	MF	POL	Rafał Zaborowski
—	FW	IND	HK Lalhruaitluanga
—	FW	IND	Zomuansanga
—	FW	IND	Jessy Vanlalmuana

== Extended contracts ==
Date	Position	Player	Ref
11 May 2023	GK	(India) Vanlalhriatpuia	
11 September 2023	DF	(India) Lalchhawnkima	

== Transfers ==
=== In ===
Position	Player	Previous club	Date	Ref
FW	(India) Lalrinzuala Lalbiaknia	(India) Chhinga Veng	13 June 2023	
GK	(India) Joel B Lalramchhana	(India) Venghunai FC	14 July 2023	
MF	(India) Lalbiakdika	(India) Bethlehem FC	16 July 2023	
MF	(India) Zomuansanga	(India) Chennaiyin B	26 July 2023	
DF	(India) Lalfamkima	(India) Minerva Academy	26 July 2023	
DF	(India) Joe Zoherliana	(India) NorthEast United	31 August 2023	
DF	(India) Supriyo Ghosh	(India) Kidderpore	01 September 2023	
MF	(India) Aditya Saha	(India) Kidderpore	01 September 2023	
DF	(India) Prosenjit Chakraborty	(India) Kidderpore	01 September 2023	
MF	(India) Subhanil Ghosh	(India) Diamond Rock FC	01 September 2023	
FW	(India) Fredsan Marshall	(India) ARA FC	01 September 2023	
DF	(Serbia) Ivan Maric	(Nepal) Satdobato Youth Club	02 September 2023	
FW	(India) Bawlte Rohmingthanga	(India) United SC	03 September 2023	
GK	(India) Nora Fernandes	(India) Churchill Brothers	04 September 2023	
MF	(India) Lalthankhuma	(India) Calcutta Customs	17 September 2023	
FW	(India) Joseph Lalvenhima	(India) Chennaiyin B	20 September 2023	
GK	(India) Vishal Joon	(India) Rajasthan United	30 September 2023	
MF	(Brazil) Gustavo	(Thailand) Chanthaburi	30 September 2023	
MF	(Poland) Rafał Zaborowski	(Poland) LKS Goczałkowice-Zdrój	22 October 2023	
FW	(Iran) Amir Memari	(Indonesia) Persipa Pati	15 January 2024	

=== Loans in ===
Date	Pos	Nationality	Player	Loaned from	Until	Ref
27 July 2023	DF	(India)	Lalhrezuala Sailung	Odisha	31 May 2024	
30 August 2023	DF	(India)	Laldanmawia	Hyderabad B	31 May 2024	
04 September 2023	MF	(India)	Sheikh Sahil	Jamshedpur	31 May 2024	

=== Out ===
Date	No.	Position	Player	To	Ref
01 June 2023		DF	(India) Lalchhawnkima	(India) Bhawanipore	
09 June 2023	28	MF	(India) Jeremy Laldinpuia	(India) Diamond Harbour	
15 June 2023		DF	(India) Zodingliana Ralte	(India) Mohammedan	
17 June 2023	19	FW	(India) David Lalhlansanga	(India) Mohammedan	
21 June 2023	33	GK	(India) Vikram Lahkbir Singh	(India) Bengaluru	
30 June 2023	99	FW	(Argentina) Matías Verón	(Nicaragua) Matagalpa FC	
01 July 2023		DF	(India) Melory Laldinsanga	(India) Project Veng FC	
02 July 2023		DF	(India) Lalbiakzuala	(India) Rajasthan United	
02 July 2023		MF	(India) Zothanpuia	(India) Rajasthan United	
26 July 2023		FW	(India) K Lalrosanga	(India) Chawnpui FC	
31 July 2023	16	DF	(Japan) Akito Saito	(Philippines) Kaya–Iloilo	
31 July 2023	35	DF	(Japan) Eisuke Mohri	(Maldives) Club Eagles	
30 September 2023	5	DF	(Nigeria) Emmanuel Makinde		
30 September 2023	8	MF	(India) Joseph Vanlalalhruaia	Free Agent	
30 September 2023	8	DF	(India) Imanuel Lalthazuala	Free Agent	
30 September 2023	24	MF	(India) Lalchhanhima Sailo	(India) Hyderabad	
30 September 2023	26	DF	(India) K Lalmalsawma	Free Agent	
30 September 2023	32	GK	(India) Lalmuansanga	Free Agent	
30 September 2023	47	FW	(India) Dawngliana	Free Agent	
30 September 2023	50	FW	(India) Thasiama	Free Agent	
30 September 2023	77	FW	(Belarus) Ivan Veras	Free Agent	
1 December 2023		GK	(India) Vishal Joon	(India) Bengaluru United	
19 January 2024		DF	(India) Prosenjit Chakraborty	(India) NEROCA FC	
18 April 2024	7	FW	(Iran) Amir Memari	(Afghanistan) Attack Energy SC	
31 May 2024	9	FW	(India) Fredsan Marshall	Ambelim Sports Club	

== Competitions ==
=== Overview ===
Competition	First match	Last match	Final position	Record							
Competition	First match	Last match	Final position	Pld	W	D	L	GF	GA	GD	Win %
I League	29 October 2023	5 April 2024	9th	24	6	9	9	36	35	+1	25.00
Total				24	6	9	9	36	35	+1	25.00

Source: Competitions

=== I-League ===
==== League table ====
Pos	Team	Pld	W	D	L	GF	GA	GD	Pts	Qualification
8	Shillong Lajong	24	8	7	9	36	37	−1	31	
9	Namdhari	24	7	6	11	29	40	−11	27	
10	Aizawl	22	6	7	9	36	35	+1	25	
11	Rajasthan United	24	6	7	11	40	63	−23	25	
12	NEROCA (R)	23	4	2	17	26	61	−35	14	Relegation to I-League 2

Source: I-League
Rules for classification: 1) Points; 2) Head-to-head points; 3) Head-to-head goal difference; 4) Total goal difference; 5) Total number of goals scored; 6) drawing of lots
(Note: Head-to-head record is used only after all the matches between the teams in question have been played).
(R) Relegated

==== Matches ====
Note: I-League announced the fixtures for the 2023–24 season on 6 October 2023.

29 October 2023 1	Mohammedan	2–1	Aizawl	Kolkata
19:00 IST	Samuel Lalmuanpuia 7'; Alexis Gómez 28'	Report	K. Lalrinfela 12'	Stadium: Naihati Stadium; Man of the Match: Alexis Gómez

7 November 2023 3	Sreenidi Deccan	1–2	Aizawl	Hyderabad
16:30 IST	Pawan Kumar 90+8'	Report	Tharpuia 26'; Bawlte Rohmingthanga 90+1'	Stadium: Deccan Arena; Attendance: 900; Referee: Mrutyunjay L. Amatya; Man of the Match: R. Ramdinthara (Aizawl)

14 November 2023 4	NEROCA	1–3	Aizawl	Kolkata
19:00 IST	Tarak Hembram 33'	Report	Lalrinzuala Lalbiaknia 62', 81', 90+6'	Stadium: Kalyani Stadium; Man of the Match: Lalrinzuala Lalbiaknia (Aizawl)

17 November 2023 5	Aizawl	1–5	Delhi	Aizawl
16:30 IST	R. Lalthanmawia 46'	Report	Gaurav Rawat 14', 23'; Aroldinho 61'; Sérgio Barboza 76'; Alaaeldin Nasr 86'	Stadium: Rajiv Gandhi Stadium; Man of the Match: Gaurav Rawat

21 November 2023 6	Aizawl	3–0	Namdhari	Aizawl
19:00 IST	Lalrinzuala Lalbiaknia 42'; K. Lalrinfela 63'; R. Lalthanmawia 90+5'	Report		Stadium: Rajiv Gandhi Stadium; Man of the Match: Lalrinzuala Lalbiaknia

28 November 2023 7	Rajasthan United	2–2	Aizawl	Hyderabad
14:00 IST	Seigoulun Khongsai 23'; Richardson Denzell 31'	Report	Lalrinzuala Lalbiaknia 26', 68'	Stadium: Deccan Arena; Man of the Match: Lalrinzuala Lalbiaknia

2 December 2023 8	Real Kashmir	0–0	Aizawl	Srinagar
14:00 IST		Report		Stadium: TRC Turf Ground; Man of the Match: Nora Fernandes(Aizawl)

7 December 2023 9	TRAU	1–5	Aizawl	Kolkata
19:00 IST	Soraisam Robinson 13'	Report	Lalrinzuala Lalbiaknia 16' (pen.), 23'; Gerard Williams 51' (o.g.); Joe Zoherliana 53', 57'	Stadium: Kalyani Stadium; Man of the Match: Joe Zoherliana (Aizawl)

10 December 2023 10	Shillong Lajong	0–3	Aizawl	Shillong
19:00 IST		Report	Lalrinzuala Lalbiaknia 5'; R. Ramdinthara 17'; Joe Zoherliana 57'	Stadium: SSA Stadium; Referee: Ashish Tiwari

16 December 2023 11	Aizawl	1–1	Gokulam Kerala	Aizawl
19:00 IST	Lalbiakdika 31'	Report	Álex Sánchez 45+4'	Stadium: Rajiv Gandhi Stadium; Man of the Match: Álex Sánchez (Gokulam Kerala)

21 December 2023 12	Aizawl	1–1	Inter Kashi	Aizawl
19:00 IST	Mohammed Asif 43'	Report	Lalhmangaihkima 88'	Stadium: Rajiv Gandhi Stadium; Attendance: 3,485; Referee: Mithun Kumar Kundu; Man of the Match: Nora Fernandes (Aizawl)

10 February 2024 13	Aizawl	0–0	Mohammedan	Aizawl
19:00 IST				Stadium: Rajiv Gandhi Stadium

15 February 2024 14	Delhi	1–0	Aizawl	Bhaini Ala
14:00 IST	Sérgio Barboza 90+3'	Report		Stadium: Namdhari Stadium; Attendance: 150; Referee: Jehrul Islam; Man of the Match: Sérgio Barboza (Delhi)

19 February 2024 15	Aizawl	1–5	Sreenidi Deccan	Aizawl
19:00 IST	Joe Zoherliana 49'	Report	David Castañeda 28'; Eli Sabiá 66'; Ibrahim Sissoko 83', 90+6'; Brandon Vanlalremdika 90'	Stadium: Rajiv Gandhi Stadium; Attendance: 1,000; Referee: Joyshing Monsang Thumily; Man of the Match: David Castañeda (Sreenidi Deccan)

23 February 2024 16	Aizawl	0–0	Rajasthan United	Aizawl
19:00 IST		Report		Stadium: Rajiv Gandhi Stadium; Attendance: 1,462; Referee: Dipu Roy; Man of the Match: Lal Biakzuala (Rajasthan United)

28 February 2024 17	Aizawl	0–1	Real Kashmir	Aizawl
19:00 IST		Report	Henry Kisekka 15'	Stadium: Rajiv Gandhi Stadium; Attendance: 1,246; Referee: Lalit Singh Rawat; Man of the Match: Henry Kisekka (Real Kashmir)

9 March 2024 19	Aizawl	1–2	Shillong Lajong	Aizawl
19:00 IST	Lalrinzuala Lalbiaknia 81' (pen.)	Report	Phrangki Buam 27'; Damaitphang Lyngdoh 90+4'	Stadium: Rajiv Gandhi Stadium; Attendance: 2,056; Referee: Surojit Das; Man of the Match: Phrangki Buam (Shillong Lajong)

14 March 2024 20	Gokulam Kerala	4–3	Aizawl	Kozhikode
19:00 IST	Matija Babović 29', 64'; Nikola Stojanović 43'; Pitu Viera 70'	Report	Lalbiakdika 20'; Akhil P. 45' (o.g.); Lalrinzuala Lalbiaknia 84'	Stadium: EMS Stadium; Attendance: 1,540; Referee: K. Ramdasan; Man of the Match: Matija Babović (Gokulam Kerala)

18 March 2024 21	Inter Kashi	5–4	Aizawl	Kalyani
19:00 IST	Edmund Lalrindika 3'; Gyamar Nikum 14'; Jordan Garrido 33'; Mario Barco 86', 89'	Report	Sumeet Passi 29' (o.g.); Lalrinzuala Lalbiaknia 44', 61'; Lalbiakdika Vanlalvunga 83'	Stadium: Kalyani Stadium; Attendance: 325; Referee: Ajay Krishnan; Man of the Match: Mario Barco (Inter Kashi)

27 March 2024 2	Aizawl	4–0	Churchill Brothers	Aizawl
19:00 IST	Lalbiaknia 29', 88'; Lalthankhuma 73', 86'	Report		Stadium: Rajiv Gandhi Stadium; Attendance: 300; Referee: Jehrul Islam; Man of the Match: Lalrinzuala Lalbiaknia (Aizawl)

1 April 2024 22	Namdhari	1–1	Aizawl	Bhaini Ala
15:30 IST	Garrido 85'	Report	Ramdinthara 40'	Stadium: Namdhari stadium Attendance: 400; Referee: Suresh Devaraj; Man of the Match: Peter Haokip (Namdhari)

5 April 2024 23	Churchill Brothers	2–0	Aizawl	Vasco
19:00 IST	Louis 7'; Lalmuanawma 90' (o.g.)	Report		Stadium: Tilak Maidan; Attendance: 275; Referee: Mrutyunjay L. Amatya; Man of the Match: Ogana Louis (Churchill Brothers)

9 April 2024 18	Aizawl	Cancelled	TRAU	Aizawl
19:00 IST				Stadium: Rajiv Gandhi Stadium

12 April 2024 24	Aizawl	Cancelled	NEROCA	Aizawl
19:00 IST				Stadium: Rajiv Gandhi Stadium

== Statistics ==
=== Goal scorers ===
Rank	No.	Pos.	Nat.	Name	I League	Super Cup	Total
1	18	FW	(India)	Lalrinzuala Lalbiaknia	15	0	15
2	14	DF	(India)	Joe Zoherliana	4	0	4
3	7	FW	(India)	R Lalthanmawia	2	0	2
3	9	FW	(India)	Tharpuia	2	0	2
3	10	MF	(India)	K Lalrinfela	2	0	2
6	21	MF	(India)	K Lalhmangaihkima	1	0	1
6	32	FW	(India)	Lalbiakdika	1	0	1
6	88	FW	(India)	Bawlte Rohmingthanga	1	0	1
Own Goals					1	0	0
Total					24	0	24
