= 2024–25 Mohammedan SC (Kolkata) season =

Indian football club season

Mohammedan
2024–25 season
- Owner: Mohammedan Sporting Club Private Limited (50%); Bunkerhill Private Limited (50%)
- Chairman: Gulam Ashraf
- Head coach: Andrey Chernyshov
- Stadium: Salt Lake Stadium; Kishore Bharati Krirangan
- Indian Super League: Regular season: 13th Play-offs: DNQ
- Indian Super Cup: Round of 16
- Durand Cup: Group stage
- Calcutta Football League: Super Six
Home colours	Away colours

The 2024–25 season was the 132nd season in the existence of Mohammedan and their first season in the Indian Super League following promotion from I-League, they also compete in the Durand Cup and Indian Super Cup.

== Staff ==
Position	Staff
Manager	(Russia) Andrey Chernyshov
Assistant Manager	(India) Alison Kharsyntiew
Head of Goalkeeping	(Serbia) Milos Petrovic
Head Physiotherapist	(India) Dibyajit Mitra
Assistant Physiotherapist	(India) Md. Belal Qureshi
Strength & Conditioning Coach	(India) Arsalan Mirza
Performance Analyst	(India) Devrup J. Gupta
Media manager	(India) Koustav Halder

== Squad ==
=== First-team squad ===
As of 1 September 2024

Note: Flags indicate national team as defined under FIFA eligibility rules; some limited exceptions apply. Players may hold more than one non-FIFA nationality.

No.	Pos.	Nation	Player
1	GK	IND	Padam Chettri
4	MF	UZB	Mirjalol Kasimov
5	DF	IND	Gaurav Bora
6	MF	IND	Abhishek Halder
7	FW	IND	Rochharzela
8	MF	IND	Amarjit Singh Kiyam
9	FW	BRA	França
10	FW	ARG	Alexis Gómez
11	MF	IND	Wahengbam Angousana
14	DF	IND	Zodingliana Ralte
15	DF	IND	Dipu Halder
16	DF	IND	Mohammed Irshad
17	FW	CAF	César Lobi Manzoki
18	MF	IND	Jeremy Laldinpuia
19	FW	IND	Makan Chothe

No.	Pos.	Nation	Player
21	MF	IND	K.Lalrinfela
24	DF	IND	Joe Zoherliana
25	DF	IND	Samad Ali Mallick (captain)
27	GK	IND	Bhaskar Roy
28	DF	GHA	Joseph Adjei
29	FW	IND	Lalremsanga Fanai
34	DF	IND	Vanlalzuidika
42	MF	GHA	Mohammed Kadiri
55	DF	IND	Mohammed Jassim
66	DF	IND	Sajad Hussain Parray
71	GK	IND	Subhajit Bhattacharjee
—	FW	IND	Sagolsem Bikash Singh (on loan from Kerala Blasters)
—	GK	IND	Nikhil Deka
—	FW	IND	Soraisam Robinson Singh

== Transfers ==
=== Transfers in ===
Date	Position	Nationality	Player	From	Fee	Ref
17 August 2024	MF	(Ghana)	Mohammed Kadiri	(Azerbaijan) Araz-Naxçıvan	None	
18 August 2024	FW	(Brazil)	França	(Bulgaria) Lokomotiv Sofia	None	
21 August 2024	FW	(Central African Republic)	César Lobi Manzoki	(United Arab Emirates) Hatta Club	None	
22 August 2024	FW	(India)	Makan Chothe	(India) Hyderabad	None	
22 August 2024	DF	(India)	Gaurav Bora	(India) NorthEast United	None	
23 August 2024	MF	(India)	Amarjit Singh Kiyam	(India) Punjab	None	
24 August 2024	DF	(India)	Sajad Hussain Parray	(India) Hyderabad	None	
25 August 2024	DF	(India)	Joe Zoherliana	(India) Aizawl	None	
25 August 2024	FW	(India)	Rochharzela	(India) NorthEast United	None	
26 August 2024	MF	(India)	Jeremy Laldinpuia	(India) Real Kashmir	None	
26 August 2024	MF	(India)	Lalremsanga Fanai	(India) Rajasthan United	None	
5 September 2024	GK	(India)	Bhaskar Roy	(India) Mumbai City	None	
6 September 2024	MF	(India)	Lalrinfela	(India) Aizawl	None	

=== Loans in ===
Date from	Position	Nationality	Player	From	Date until	Ref.
31 August 2024	MF	(India)	Bikash Singh	(India) Kerala Blasters	31 May 2025	

=== Loans out ===
Date from	Position	Nationality	Player	To	Date until	Ref
1 September 2024	MF	(India)	Tanmoy Ghosh	(India) Rajasthan United	31 May 2025	
1 September 2024	DF	(India)	Thokchom James Singh	(India) Delhi	31 May 2025	
1 September 2024	FW	(India)	Ashley Alban Koli	(India) Churchill Brothers	31 May 2025	
1 September 2024	MF	(India)	Tangva Ragui	(India) SC Bengaluru	31 May 2025	
1 September 2024	MF	(India)	Sajal Bag	(India) Delhi	31 May 2025	

=== Transfers out ===
Date	Position	Nationality	Player	To	Fee	Ref
1 June 2024	MF	(India)	Sagolsem Bikash Singh	(India) Kerala Blasters	Loan Return	
1 June 2024	FW	(India)	Lalremsanga Fanai	(India) Rajasthan United	Loan Return	
5 June 2024	MF	(India)	Bedashwor Singh			
6 June 2024	GK	(India)	Lalbiakhlua Jongte	(India) Hyderabad	Loan Return	
7 June 2024	GK	(India)	James Kithan		Free Agent	
8 June 2024	FW	(Russia)	Evgeniy Kozlov	(Kazakhstan) Shakhter Karagandy	Free Transfer	
9 June 2024	DF	(India)	Karandeep Singh		Free Agent	
12 June 2024	MF	(Argentina)	Juan Nellar		Free Agent	
13 June 2024	MF	(India)	Abhijit Sarkar	(India) Thrissur Magic	Free Agent	
14 June 2024	FW	(India)	Beneston Barretto		Free Agent	
14 June 2024	FW	(India)	SK Faiaz		Free Agent	
17 July 2024	FW	(Honduras)	Eddie Hernández		Free Agent	
18 June 2024	FW	(India)	David Lalhlansanga	(India) East Bengal	Free Transfer	
22 July 2024	MF	(India)	Samuel Lalmuanpuia	(India) Aizawl	Free Transfer	
23 July 2024	DF	(India)	Dettol Moirangthem	(India) Classic FA	Loan Return	

== Pre-season and friendlies ==
30 August 2024	Super League Kerala IX	1–2	Mohammedan	Manjeri
19:00 IST	Kervens Belfort 25'		Lalremsanga Fanai 21'; Mohammed Kadiri 75'	Stadium: Malappuram District Sports Complex Stadium

== Competitions ==
=== Overview ===
Competition	First match	Last match	Starting round	Final position	Record							
Competition	First match	Last match	Starting round	Final position	Pld	W	D	L	GF	GA	GD	Win %
Durand Cup	28 July 2024	13 August 2024	Group stage	Group stage	3	1	1	1	4	4	+0	33.33
Super Cup	24 April 2025	24 April 2025	Round of 16	Round of 16	1	0	0	1	0	6	−6	0.00
Indian Super League	16 September 2024	10 March 2025	Matchday 1	13th place	24	2	15	7	12	43	−31	8.33
CFL Premier Division (Note: Mohammedan SC fielded mainly their reserve squad and few Indian players of main squad for Calcutta Football League.)	30 June 2024	18 February 2025	Group stage	Super Six	17	7	5	5	33	20	+13	41.18
Total					45	10	21	14	49	73	−24	22.22

Last updated: 29 October 2025.
Source: Soccerway

=== Indian Super League ===
==== League table ====
Pos	Team	Pld	W	D	L	GF	GA	GD	Pts
9	East Bengal	24	8	4	12	27	33	−6	28 (Note: Head-to-head points: East Bengal 6, Punjab 0.)
10	Punjab	24	8	4	12	34	38	−4	28
11	Chennaiyin	24	7	6	11	34	39	−5	27
12	Hyderabad	24	4	6	14	22	47	−25	18
13	Mohammedan	24	2	7	15	12	43	−31	13

Source: ISL
Rules for classification: 1) points; 2) goal difference; 3) number of goals scored; 4) head-to-head points; 5) head-to-head goal difference; 6) head-to-head goals scored; 7) fair play ranking; 8) drawing of lots
(Note: Head-to-head record is used only after all the matches between the teams in question have been played).

==== Results summary ====
Overall								Home						Away					
Pld	W	D	L	GF	GA	GD	Pts	W	D	L	GF	GA	GD	W	D	L	GF	GA	GD
16	2	5	9	8	24	−16	11	0	3	5	5	13	−8	2	2	4	3	11	−8

Last updated: 15 January 2025.
Source: soccerway

===== Results by round =====
Round	1	2	3	4	5	6	7	8	9	10	11	12	13	14	15	16	17	18
Ground	H	H	A	A	H	H		A	H	A	A	H	A	H	A	A	H	A
Result	L	D	W	L	L	L		D	L	L	L	L	L	D	D	W	D	
Position	13	10	7	10	11	12		12	12	12	13	13	13	13	13	12	12	

A = Away; H = Home; W = Win; D = Draw; L = Loss

==== Matches ====
16 September 2024 1	Mohammedan	0–1	NorthEast United	Kolkata
19:00 IST				Stadium: Kishore Bharati Krirangan; Attendance: TBD; Referee: TBD; Man of the Match: TBD

21 September 2024 2	Mohammedan	1–1	Goa	Kolkata
19:00 IST	Adjei (yellow card) 54'; Gómez (yellow card) 57' (goal) 66' (pen.)	Report	Dorjee (yellow card) 35'; Dražić (yellow card) 37'; Odei Onaindia (yellow card) 64'; Kattimani (yellow card) 67'; Gupta (yellow card) 89'; Sadiku 90+4'	Stadium: Kishore Bharati Krirangan; Attendance: 4,188; Referee: (India) Aditya Purkayastha

26 September 2024 3	Chennaiyin	0–1	Mohammedan	Chennai
20:30 IST	Laldinpuia (yellow card) 69'; Nassiri (yellow card) 71'; Renthlei (yellow card) 90+8'; Lukas Brambilla (yellow card) 90+8'; Hnamte (yellow card) 90+9'	Report	Kasimov (yellow card) 34'; Fanai 39'; Ralte (yellow card) 90+2'	Stadium: Jawaharlal Nehru Stadium; Attendance: 9,791; Referee: (India) Tejas Nagvenkar

5 October 2024 4	Mohun Bagan	3–0	Mohammedan	Kolkata
20:30 IST	Maclaren 8' (yellow card) 28'; Bose 31'; Stewart 36'; Singh (yellow card) 54'; Aldred (yellow card) 78'	Report	França (yellow card) 19'; Gómez (yellow card) 24'; Adjei (yellow card) 31'; Bora (yellow card) 33'; Chhakchhuak (yellow card) 67'; Mallick (yellow card) 83'	Stadium: Vivekananda Yuba Bharati Krirangan; Referee: (India) Venkatesh Ramachandran

20 October 2024 5	Mohammedan	1–2	Kerala Blasters	Kolkata
20:30 IST	Chhakchhuak (yellow card) 11'; Kasimov 28' (pen.); França (yellow card) 66'; Gómez (yellow card) 69'; Mallick (yellow card) 90+6'	Report	Azhar (yellow card) 23'; Luna (yellow card) 45+3'; Peprah 67'; Jesús Jiménez 75'; Kumar (yellow card) 90+3'; Singh (yellow card) 90+3'	Stadium: Kishore Bharati Krirangan; Attendance: 6,203; Referee: (India) Ashwin Anand Kumar

26 October 2024 6	Mohammedan	0–4	Hyderabad	Kolkata
20:30 IST	Kasimov (yellow card) 45+3'; Irshad (yellow card) 90+2'; Parray (yellow card) 90+4'	Report	Allan Paulista 4' 15'; Šapić 12'; Saji (yellow card) 45+3'; Rabeeh (yellow card) 47'; Shrivas 51'	Stadium: Kishore Bharati Krirangan; Attendance: 5,276; Referee: (India) Pranjal Banerjee

9 November 2024 8	East Bengal	0–0	Mohammedan	Kolkata
19:30 IST	Naorem (yellow card) 7' (yellow-red card) 30'; Hijazi Maher (yellow card) 15'; Seker (red card) 29'; Saúl Crespo (yellow card) 40'	Report	Amarjit Singh (yellow card) 28'; César Lobi Manzoki (yellow card) 90+2'	Stadium: Vivekananda Yuba Bharati Krirangan; Attendance: 21,119; Referee: (India) Harish Kundu

27 November 2024 9	Mohammedan	1–2	Bengaluru	Kolkata
19:30 IST	César Lobi Manzoki 8' (yellow card) 79'; Irshad (yellow card) 29'; Kasimov (yellow card) 64'; Ralte (yellow card) 70'; Gómez (yellow card) 90+9'	Report	Alberto Noguera (yellow card) 13'; Chhetri 82' (pen.); Bheke (yellow card) 90+1'; Ogier 90+9' (o.g.); Narayanan (yellow card) 90+10'	Stadium: Kishore Bharati Krirangan; Attendance: 2,541; Referee: (India) Crystal John

2 December 2024 10	Jamshedpur	3–1	Mohammedan	Jamshedpur
19:30 IST	Mehta (yellow card) 47'; Sanan 53'; Javier Siverio 61'; Eze 79'; Gomes (yellow card) 90+6'; Chaudhari (yellow card) 90+6'	Report	Amarjit Singh (yellow card) 11'; Ogier (yellow card) 54'; Chhakchhuak (yellow card) 81'; Wahengbam Angousana (yellow card) 84'; Irshad 88'; Adjei (yellow card) 89'	Stadium: JRD Tata Sports Complex; Attendance: 11,890; Referee: (India) Senthil Nathan

6 December 2024 11	Punjab	2–0	Mohammedan	New Delhi
19:30 IST	Sudeesh (yellow card) 32'; Meitei (yellow card) 42'; Majcen 58'; Mrzljak 66'; Shabong (yellow card) 89'	Report	Mallick (yellow card) 35'; Kasimov (yellow card) 84'; Ralte (yellow card) 90+2'	Stadium: Jawaharlal Nehru Stadium; Attendance: 2,146; Referee: (India) Harish Kundu

15 December 2024 12	Mohammedan	0–1	Mumbai City	Kolkata
19:30 IST	Irshad (yellow card) 32' (yellow-red card) 35'; Gómez (yellow card) 65'	Report	Ralte (yellow card) 41'; Partap Singh 49'; Tiri (yellow card) 53'; Karelis (yellow card) 87'	Stadium: Kishore Bharati Krirangan; Attendance: 3,183; Referee: (India) K Ramdasan

22 December 2024 13	Kerala Blasters	3–0	Mohammedan	Kochi
19:30 IST	Roy 62' (o.g.); Ruivah (yellow card) 79'; Sadaoui 80'; Dohling (yellow card) 89'; Coeff 90'	Report	Kasimov (yellow card) 38'; Ogier (yellow card) 76'	Stadium: Jawaharlal Nehru Stadium; Attendance: 15,715; Referee: (India) Senthil Nathan

27 December 2024 14	Mohammedan	0–0	Odisha	Kolkata
19:30 IST	Kasimov (yellow card) 3'; César Lobi Manzoki (yellow card) 53'; Ralte (yellow card) 75'	Report	Fall (yellow card) 81'; Kumar (yellow card) 80+6'	Stadium: Kishore Bharati Krirangan; Attendance: 2,177; Referee: (India) Venkatesh Ramachandran

3 January 2025 15	NorthEast United	0–0	Mohammedan	Guwahati
19:30 IST	Tlang (yellow card) 21'; Macarton Nickson (yellow card) 60'; Bemammer (yellow card) 90+12'	Report	Ogier (yellow card) 11'	Stadium: Indira Gandhi Athletic Stadium; Attendance: 8,193; Referee: (India) Aditya Purkayastha

=== Durand Cup ===
==== Group stage ====
Black panthers were drawn in to the Group B on the group-stage draw conducted on 10 July, after the President on India, Droupadi Murmu, flagged-off the trophy tour of the tournament. All the group stage matches of the Mohammeadans will play in Kolkata since all the Group B matches were drawn to be held region.

Pos	Team	Pld	W	D	L	GF	GA	GD	Pts	Qualification	BEN	MSC	IKA	INV
1	Bengaluru	3	3	0	0	10	2	+8	9	Advanced to knockout stage			3–0	4–0
2	Mohammedan (H)	3	1	1	1	4	4	0	4		2–3		1–1	1–0
3	Inter Kashi	3	1	1	1	3	5	−2	4					
4	Indian Navy	3	0	0	3	1	7	−6	0				1–2	

Source: Twitter
Rules for classification: Group stage tiebreakers
(H) Hosts

==== Matches ====
28 July 2024	Mohammedan	1–1	Inter Kashi	Kolkata, West Bengal
19:00 IST	Ashley 66'	Report	Nikola 39'	Stadium: Kishore Bharati Krirangan; Attendance: 4,829; Referee: Senthil Nathan S Man of the Match: Anand Usuda (Inter Kashi)

6 August 2024	Mohammedan	2–3	Bengaluru	Kolkata, West Bengal
19:00 IST	Israfil 77'; Mahitosh 90+3'	Report	Jovanović 7'; Dipu 22' (o.g.); Vinith 60'	Stadium: Vivekananda Yuba Bharati Krirangan; Attendance: 4,143; Referee: Venkatesh R Man of the Match: Vinith Venkatesh (Bengaluru FC)

13 August 2024	Mohammedan	1–0	Indian Navy	Kolkata, West Bengal
16:00 IST	Sujit 24'	Report		Stadium: Kishore Bharati Krirangan; Attendance: 1,236; Referee: Aditya Purkayastha; Man of the Match: Sujit Singh (Mohammedan)

=== Super Cup ===
Round of 16
20 April
8	Kerala Blasters	2
9	East Bengal	0
21 April
2	Goa	3
IL4	Gokulam Kerala	0
21 April
7	Odisha	0
10	Punjab	3
23 April
3	Bengaluru	1 (3)
IL2	Inter Kashi (p)	1 (5)
23 April
6	Mumbai City	4
11	Chennaiyin	0
24 April
4	Northeast United	6
13	Mohammedan	0
24 April
5	Jamshedpur	2
12	Hyderabad	0

Quarter-finals
26 April
8	Kerala Blasters	1
1	Mohun Bagan	2
26 April
2	Goa	2
10	Punjab	1
27 April
IL2	Inter Kashi	0
6	Mumbai City	1
27 April
4	Northeast United	0 (4)
5	Jamshedpur (p)	0 (5)

Semi-finals
30 April
1	Mohun Bagan	1
2	Goa	3
30 April
6	Mumbai City	0
5	Jamshedpur	1

Final
3 May
2	Goa	3
5	Jamshedpur	0

24 April 2025 Match 7	Northeast United	6–0	Mohammedan	Bhubaneswar
16:30 IST (UTC+5:30)	Jitin 3'; Ajaraie 19', 57', 90+2' (pen.); Albiach 43'; Guillermo 66'	AIFF; I-League; PDF		Stadium: Kalinga Stadium; Attendance: 1,781; Referee: Tejas Visvasrao Nagvenkar; Man of the Match: Alaaeddine Ajaraie (Northeast United)

=== Calcutta Football League ===
==== League table ====
===== Group A =====
Pos	Team	Pld	W	D	L	GF	GA	GD	Pts	Qualification
1	Diamond Harbour	12	10	2	0	32	7	+25	32	Qualified for the Super Six round
2	Suruchi Sangha	12	7	3	2	19	9	+10	24	Qualified for the Super Six round
3	Mohammedan	12	5	4	3	24	14	+10	19	Qualified for the Super Six round
4	Kidderpore	12	5	4	3	16	15	+1	19	
5	United SC	12	5	3	4	15	10	+5	18	

Source: The Away End
Rules for classification: 1) points; 2) head-to-head points; 3) head-to-head goal difference; 4) goal difference; 5) number of goals scored; 6) drawing of lots

===== Super Six =====
Pos	Team	Pld	W	D	L	GF	GA	GD	Pts	Qualification
1	East Bengal^{ISL} (C)	17	15	2	0	52	7	+45	47	Champions
2	Diamond Harbour^{IL2}	17	12	3	2	39	14	+25	39	
3	Bhawanipore	17	11	3	3	38	13	+25	36	
4	Calcutta Customs	17	8	5	4	32	25	+7	29	
5	Suruchi Sangha	17	8	4	5	23	22	+1	28	
6	Mohammedan^{ISL}	17	7	5	5	33	20	+13	26	

Source: The Away End
Rules for classification: 1) points; 2) goal difference; 3) number of goals scored; 4) head-to-head points; 5) head-to-head goal difference; 6) fair play ranking; 7) drawing of lots
(C) Champions
