= 2024–25 Gokulam Kerala FC season =

Indian football club season

Gokulam Kerala
2024–25 season
- Owner: Sree Gokulam Group
- Chairman President: Gokulam Gopalan; V. C. Praveen
- Head coach: Antonio Rueda (until 14 February 2025); Ranjith TA (from 15 February 2025)
- Stadium: EMS Stadium
- I-League: 3th
- Indian Super Cup: Round of 16
- Top goalscorer: League: Thabiso Brown (11); All: Thabiso Brown (11)
- Highest home attendance: 6,243 vs Aizawl (3 December 2024)
- Lowest home attendance: 200 vs Shillong Lajong (3 March 2025)
- Average home league attendance: 2,685
- Biggest win: 5-0 (vs Delhi, 8 January 2025)
- Biggest defeat: 0-2 (vs Namdhari, 17 January 2025)
Home colours	Away colours
- All statistics correct as of 21 April 2025.

The 2024–25 season was Gokulam Kerala's eighth since its establishment in 2017 and their seventh in the I-League. They finished fourth in the league, having remained in title contention until the final matchday. The club also competed in the 2025 Indian Super Cup April edition, where they were eliminated in the Round of 16.

== Current technical staff ==
Position	Name
Head coach	(India) Ranjith TA
Assistant coach	Vacant
Fitness and conditioning coach	(India) Saifulla
Technical director	(India) Ranjan Chowdhury
Goalkeeping coach	(India) Fysal Bappu
Team manager	(India) Nikidesh

== First-team squad ==
Squad no.	Name	Nationality	Position(s)	Age	Previous club	Since	Apps	Goals	Assists
Goalkeepers
1	Bishorjit Singh	(India)	GK	31	(India) TRAU	2023	8	0	0
12	Rakshit Dagar	(India)	GK	31	(India) Inter Kashi	2021, 2025-	33	0	0
42	Shibinraj Kunniyil	(India)	GK	31	(India) Punjab	2018–19, 2022–23, 2024	51	0	0
	Avilash Paul	(India)	GK	29	(India) Mohun Bagan SG	2023	14	0	0
Defenders
2	Salam Ranjan Singh	(India)	CB	28	(India) TRAU	2023	33	0	1
4	Athul Unnikrishnan	(India)	RB	26	(India) East Bengal II	2024	21	2	0
5	Nidhin Krishna	(India)	CB/ RB	25	(India) Kerala United	2023	47	1	1
13	Rahul khoukar	(India)	LB	25	(India) Bangalore Eagles	2023	6	0	0
18	Laishram Johnson	(India)	RB/LB	18	(India) Sagolband United	2023	14	1	1
27	Sebastian Thangmuansang	(India)	RB	26	(India) Churchill Brothers	2019-2021, 2024	43	0	3
30	Bibin Ajayan	(India)	CB	26	GKFC Reserves	2024	10	0	0
66	Mashoor Shereef	(India)	CB/RB	31	(India) Punjab	2024	21	1	0
93	Akhil Praveen	(India)	CB	29	(India) Kerala United	2022	24	0	0
MidFielders
6	Rishad PP	(India)	CM	28	(India) GKFC Reserves	2021	60	3	4
7	Abhijith Kurungodan	(India)	CM	27	(India) GKFC Reserves	2021	53	6	4
10	Martín Cháves	(Uruguay)	AM	26	(India) Churchill Brothers	2024	19	2	4
19	Emil Benny	(India)	AM	24	(India) Jamshedpur	2020-2022, 2024	48	4	8
28	Sergio Llamas	(Spain)	CM	31	(Bolivia) Guabirá	2024	21	1	5
77	Saurav Mandal	(India)	AM	24	(India) Kerala Blasters	2025	7	0	0
99	Rahul Raju	(India)	CM	20	(India) Bengaluru B	2022	36	2	0
Forwards
9	Adama Niane	(Mali)	FW	31	(Azerbaijan) Kapaz	2024	20	6	2
11	Tharpuia	(India)	FW	22	(India) Aizawl	2024	9	1	1
15	VP Suhair	(India)	FW	32	(India) East Bengal	2016–17, 2018–19, 2024	36	1	4
17	Nacho Abeledo	(Spain)	FW	28	(Spain) Talavera	2024	22	9	8
21	Thabiso Brown	(Lesotho)	FW	29	(China) Jiangxi Lushan	2025	10	11	1
23	Michael Soosairaj	(India)	FW	29	(India) Odisha	2024	13	1	0
24	Ranjeet Pandre	(India)	FW	29	(India) Punjab	2024	10	1	0
70	Wander Luiz	(Brazil)	FW	32	(Vietnam) Ho Chi Minh City	2025	1	0	0
77	Siniša Stanisavić	(Montenegro)	FW	29	(Kyrgyzstan) Dzhalal-Abad	2025	13	5	0
	Senthamil Shanbagam	(India)	FW	23	(India) Chennaiyin	2023	10	0	0

== New contracts ==
Date	Position	No.	Player	Ref.
6 July 2024	MF	06	(India) Rishad PP	

== Transfers and loans ==
=== Transfers in ===
Entry date	Position	Player	Previous club	Fee	Ref.
2 May 2024	FW	(Uruguay) Martín Cháves	(India) Churchill Brothers	None	
1 June 2024	MF	(India) Arjun Jayaraj	(India) SC Bengaluru	Loan Return	
1 June 2024	MF	(India) Dilip Oraon	(India) United SC	Loan Return	
1 June 2024	MF	(India) Rahul Raju	(India) Churchill Brothers	Loan Return	
22 June 2024	FW	(India) Michael Soosairaj	(India) Odisha	None	
7 July 2024	MF	(Spain) Sergio Llamas	(Bolivia) Guabirá	None	
9 July 2024	DF	(India) Muhammed Jiyad	(India) Luca SC	None	
14 July 2024	DF	(Colombia) José Luis Moreno	(Venezuela) Metropolitanos	None	
18 July 2024	DF	(India) Athul Unnikrishnan	(India) East Bengal Reserves	None	
23 July 2024	FW	(Uganda) Abdu Lumala	(Croatia) Slaven Belupo	None	
6 August 2024	FW	(Spain) Nacho Abeledo	(Spain) Talavera	None	
13 August 2024	DF	(India) Sebastian Thangmuansang	(India) Churchill Brothers	None	
21 August 2024	FW	(India) Tharpuia	(India) Aizawl	None	
30 August 2024	FW	(France) Joris Correa	(France) Olympique Alès	None	
31 August 2024	GK	(India) Shibinraj Kunniyil		None	
31 August 2024	MF	(India) Vasim Inamdar	(India) Dempo	None	
29 September 2024	FW	(India) VP Suhair	(India) East Bengal	None	
4 October 2024	MF	(India) Emil Benny	(India) Jamshedpur	None	
17 November 2024	FW	(Mali) Adama Niane	(Azerbaijan) Kapaz	None	
4 January 2025	FW	(Montenegro) Siniša Stanisavić	(Kyrgyzstan) Dzhalal-Abad	None	
14 January 2025	FW	(Brazil) Wander Luiz	(Vietnam) Ho Chi Minh City	None	
31 January 2025	GK	(India) Rakshit Dagar	(India) Inter Kashi	None	
7 February 2025	FW	(Lesotho) Thabiso Brown	(China) Jiangxi Lushan	None	

=== Loan in ===
Start date	End date	Position	Player	From club	Fee	Ref
3 September 2024	End of the season	FW	(India) Muhammad Ajsal	(India) Kerala Blasters	None	
30 October 2024	End of the season	FW	(India) Ranjeet Pandre	(India) Punjab	None	
15 December 2024	End of the season	MF	(India) Saurav Mandal	(India) Kerala Blasters	None	
31 January 2025	End of the season	DF	(India) Halen Nongtdu	(India) Mumbai City	None	

=== Loan out ===
Start date	End date	Position	Player	To club	Fee	Ref
24 January 2025	End of season	FW	Senthamil S	SAT	None	

=== Transfers out ===
Exit date	Position	No.	Player	To club	Fee	Ref.
24 April 2024	FW	38	(Spain) Álex Sánchez	(India) Malappuram	Free Transfer	
25 May 2024	FW	7	(Tajikistan) Komron Tursunov			
31 May 2024	MF	29	(India) Noufal PN	(India) Mumbai City	Free Transfer	
1 June 2024	DF	33	(India) Muhammad Saheef	(India) Kerala Blasters	Loan Return	
1 June 2024	GK	35	(India) Devansh Dabas	(India) Chennaiyin	Loan Return	
1 June 2024	MF	77	(India) Lalliansanga Renthlei	(India) Odisha	Loan Return	
7 June 2024	FW	8	(India) Sreekuttan VS	(India) Jamshedpur FC	Free Transfer	
10 June 2024	DF	17	(Cameroon) Aminou Bouba	(India) Real Kashmir	Free Transfer	
10 July 2024	DF	3	(India) Saurabh Meher			
10 July 2024	MF	44	(India) Basit Ahmed Bhat	(India) Downtown Heroes	Free Transfer	
17 July 2024	MF	10	(Spain) Pitu Viera	(Spain) Tamaraceite		
17 July 2024	MF	20	(Serbia) Nikola Stojanović	(India) Inter Kashi	Free Transfer	
17 July 2024	FW	25	(Serbia) Matija Babović	(India) Dempo	Free Transfer	
29 July 2024	DF	15	(India) Abdul Hakku	(India) Calicut	Free Transfer	
29 July 2024	DF	45	(India) Anas Edathodika	(India) Malappuram FC	Free Transfer	
29 July 2024	FW	11	(India) Sourav K	(India) Hyderabad	Free Transfer	
1 August 2024	DF	04	(India) Vikas Saini	(India) Kannur Warriors FC	Free Transfer	
21 August 2024	MF		(India) Arjun Jayaraj	(India) Forca Kochi FC	Free Transfer	
17 January 2025	DF		(Colombia) José Luis Moreno	(India) Churchill Brothers	Free Transfer	
20 January 2025	FW		(India) Muhammad Ajsal	(India) Kerala Blasters	Loan Return	
12 March 2025	MF		(India) Christy Davis	(India) Muthoot FA	Free Transfer	

== Pre-season ==
On 24 August, Gokulam Kerala announced they will participate in the second edition of Climate Cup in Leh, Ladakh during pre-season.

1 September 2024 Climate Cup GS	Skalzangling FC	1-8	Gokulam Kerala	Leh
14:00 IST	T.Angchok		Athul Unnikrishnan; Rahul Raju; Sebastian Thangmuansang; Tharpuia; Shijin Thadhayouse; Nidhin Krishna; Laishram Johnson	Stadium: Spituk Football Stadium

2 September 2024 Climate Cup GS	Gokulam Kerala	2-0	J&K Bank FC	Leh
16:30 IST	Rahul Raju; Mashoor Shereef			Stadium: Spituk Football Stadium

5 September 2024 Climate Cup SF	Gokulam Kerala	0-0 (4–2 p)	1 Ladakh FC	Leh
09:30 IST				Stadium: Spituk Football Stadium

7 September 2024 Climate Cup F	Gokulam Kerala	4-0	J&K Bank FC	Leh
11:00 IST	Mashoor Shereef 22'; OG 34'; Tharpuia 47'; Vasim Inamdar 87'			Stadium: Spituk Football Stadium

26 September 2024 Friendly	Gokulam Kerala	1-0	Kerala Police	Kozhikode
16:00 IST	Tharpuia			Stadium: EMS Stadium

12 October 2024 Friendly	Chennaiyin	2-1	Gokulam Kerala	Chennai
IST		Game played in 3 parts of 45 minutes: 0–0 at 45', 0–1 at 90', 2–1 at 135'		Stadium: Marina Arena

14 November 2024 Friendly	Gokulam Kerala	2-1	Kerala	Kozhikode
16:00 IST				Stadium: EMS Stadium

== Competitions ==
=== Overview ===
Competition	First match	Last match	Starting round	Final position	Record							
Competition	First match	Last match	Starting round	Final position	Pld	W	D	L	GF	GA	GD	Win %
I-League	22 November 2024	6 April 2025	Match Day 1	4th	22	11	4	7	45	29	+16	50.00
Indian Super Cup	21 April 2025	21 April 2025	R16	R16	1	0	0	1	0	3	−3	0.00
Total					23	11	4	8	45	32	+13	47.83

Last updated: 21 April 2025
Source: Competitions

=== I-League ===
==== League table ====
Pos	Team	Pld	W	D	L	GF	GA	GD	Pts	Promotion or relegation
2	Churchill Brothers	22	11	7	4	45	25	+20	40 (Note: Churchill Brothers were deducted one point and awarded two, which were later revoked by the Court of Arbitration for Sport and Churchill Brothers challenges this decision in Federal Supreme Court of Switzerland, which was dismissed, preventing further changes in points table.)	
3	Real Kashmir	22	10	7	5	31	25	+6	37 (Note: The forfeit win originally awarded to Real Kashmir was revoked by CAS in favor of Inter Kashi.)	
4	Gokulam Kerala	22	11	4	7	45	29	+16	37 (Note: Head-to-head: Real Kashmir 4, Gokulam Kerala 1)	Qualification for Super Cup (April) and (October)
5	Rajasthan United	22	9	6	7	34	33	+1	33	Qualification for Super Cup (October)
6	Dempo	22	8	5	9	35	33	+2	29 (Note: Head-to-head: Dempo 4, Namdhari 1)	Qualification for Super Cup (October)

Source: I-League
Rules for classification: 1) Points; 2) Head-to-head points; 3) Head-to-head goal difference; 4) Total goal difference; 5) Total goals scored; 6) Drawing of lots
(Note: Head-to-head applies only after all relevant matches are played)

==== Results by round ====
Round	1	2	3	4	5	6	7	8	9	10	11	12	13	14	15	16	17	18	19	20	21	22
Ground	A	A	H	H	A	H	A	A	H	H	H	A	A	H	H	A	H	A	A	A	H	H
Result	W	D	D	L	D	D	W	W	L	W	W	L	L	L	W	W	L	W	W	W	W	L
Position	2	5	6	7	7	7	4	4	5	4	3	4	7	7	6	4	5	4	4	4	2	4
Points	3	4	5	5	6	7	10	13	13	16	19	19	19	19	22	25	25	28	31	34	37	37

Updated to match(es) played on 06 April 2025. Source:
A = Away; H = Home; W = Win; D = Draw; L = Loss

==== Matches ====
Note: I-League announced the fixtures for the 2024–25 season on 23 October 2024.

22 November 2024 1	Sreenidi Deccan	2-3	Gokulam Kerala	Hyderabad
16.30 IST	Lalromawia 40'; David Castañeda 90+6'	Report	Cháves 60'; Abeledo 85'; Tharpuia 90+5'	Stadium: Deccan Arena; Attendance: 800; Referee: K Ramdasan; Man of the Match: Abeledo(Gokulam Kerala)

29 November 2024 2	Real Kashmir	1-1	Gokulam Kerala	Srinagar
14.00 IST	Bouba 2'	Report	Athul 76'	Stadium: TRC Turf Ground; Attendance: 6,420; Referee: Jatinder Singh

3 December 2024 3	Gokulam Kerala	1-1	Aizawl	Kozhikode
19.00 IST	Rishad PP 45+1'	Report	Lalhriatpuia . 13'	Stadium: EMS Stadium; Attendance: 6,243; Referee: Aravind Shekhar A Man of the Match: Rishad PP (Gokulam Kerala)

7 December 2024 4	Gokulam Kerala	0-1	Churchill Brothers	Kozhikode
19.00 IST		Report	Stendly Fernandes 13'	Stadium: EMS Stadium; Attendance: 3,250; Referee: Dipu Roy; Man of the Match: Lamgoulen Semkholun (Churchill Brothers)

14 December 2024 5	Shillong Lajong	0-0	Gokulam Kerala	Shillong
16.30 IST		Report		Stadium: Jawaharlal Nehru Stadium; Attendance: 3,665; Referee: Muhammed Junaid; Man of the Match: Abeledo(Gokulam Kerala)

19 December 2024 6	Gokulam Kerala	0-0	Rajasthan United	Kozhikode
19.00 IST		Report		Stadium: EMS Stadium; Attendance: 3,220; Referee: Mrutyunjay L Amatya; Man of the Match: Sergio Llamas (Gokulam Kerala)

8 January 2025 7	Delhi	0-5	Gokulam Kerala	Mahilpur
14.00 IST		Report	Adama Niane 41', 63'; Rahul Raju 81'; Danilo 89' (o.g.); Abeledo 90+5'	Stadium: Mahilpur Football Stadium; Attendance: 10,738; Referee: Mrutyunjay L Amatya; Man of the Match: Sergio Llamas(Gokulam Kerala)

14 January 2025 8	Dempo	0-1	Gokulam Kerala	Panaji
16.30 IST		Report	Abhijith K 86'	Stadium: Fatorda Stadium; Attendance: 350; Referee: I Jamal Mohamed; Man of the Match: Abhijith K (Gokulam Kerala)

17 January 2025 9	Gokulam Kerala	0-2	Namdhari	Kozhikode
19.00 IST				Stadium: EMS Stadium

24 January 2025 10	Gokulam Kerala	6-2	Inter Kashi	Kozhikode
19.00 IST	Siniša Stanisavić 10', 30', 73'; Abeledo 45+3', 90+5'; Sergio Llamas 51'	Report	Bryce Miranda 3'; Matija Babović 27'	Stadium: EMS Stadium; Attendance: 3,210; Referee: K.Ramdasan; Man of the Match: Abeledo (Gokulam Kerala)

29 January 2025 11	Gokulam Kerala	2-0	Sporting Bengaluru	Kozhikode
19.00 IST	Abeledo 45+3', 90+5'	Report		Stadium: EMS Stadium; Attendance: 2 Man of the Match: Abeledo (Gokulam Kerala)

1 February 2025 12	Inter Kashi	3-2	Gokulam Kerala	Kolkata
19.00 IST		Report	Abhijith K 40'; Siniša Stanisavić 74'	Stadium: Naihati Stadium; Attendance: 279; Referee: Surojit Das

7 February 2025 13	Churchill Brothers	2-1	Gokulam Kerala	Raia
16.30 IST	Lalremruata Ralte 21'; Kingslee Fernandes 62'	Report	Michael Soosairaj 90+4'	Stadium: Raia Panchayat Ground; Attendance: 1,000; Referee: Lakshay; Man of the Match: Lalremruata Ralte

12 February 2025 14	Gokulam Kerala	0-1	Real Kashmir	Kozhikode
19.00 IST				Stadium: EMS Stadium

17 February 2025 15	Gokulam Kerala	6-3	Delhi	Kozhikode
19.00 IST	Cháves 13'; Adama Niane 21', 54'; Abeledo 57', 75'; Ranjeet 90+9'	Report	Gwgwmsar Gayary 3'; Hridaya Jain 64'; Stéphane Binong 81'	Stadium: EMS Stadium; Attendance: 400; Referee: Jatinder Singh; Man of the Match: Abeledo (Gokulam Kerala)

25 February 2025 16	Aizawl	1-2	Gokulam Kerala	Aizawl
19.00 IST	Samuel Lalmuanpuia 17'	Report	Siniša Stanisavić 49'; Thabiso Brown 90+5'	Stadium: Rajiv Gandhi Stadium; Attendance: 400; Referee: Surojit Das; Man of the Match: Samuel Lalmuanpuia

3 March 2025 17	Gokulam Kerala	3-4	Shillong Lajong	Kozhikode
19.00 IST	Thabiso Brown 9', 54'; Mashoor Shereef 88'	Report	Phrangki Buam 14', 50'; Marcos Rudwere 85'; Renan Paulino 90+7'	Stadium: EMS Stadium; Attendance: 200; Referee: I Jamal Mohamed; Man of the Match: Phrangki Buam

6 March 2025 18	Rajasthan United	0-3	Gokulam Kerala	Jaipur
19.00 IST	Thabiso Brown 45', 81'; Athul Unnikrishnan 57'	Report		Stadium: Vidhyadhar Nagar Stadium; Attendance: 254; Referee: Lakshay; Man of the Match: Thabiso Brown

17 March 2025 19	Namdhari	1-3	Gokulam Kerala	Bhaini Sahib
19.00 IST	Manvir Singh 63'	Report	Thabiso Brown 57'; Adama Niane 81'; Abeledo 90+2'	Stadium: Namdhari Stadium; Attendance: 500; Referee: Pratik Mondal; Man of the Match: Nishan Singh

22 March 2025 20	Sporting Bengaluru	1-2	Gokulam Kerala	Bengaluru
16.30 IST	Thomyo Shimray 90+1'	Report	Thabiso Brown 46'; Adama Niane 75'	Stadium: Bangalore Football Stadium; Attendance: 300; Referee: Aswin; Man of the Match: Adama Niane

30 March 2025 21	Gokulam Kerala	1-0	Sreenidi Deccan	Kozhikode
19.00 IST	Thabiso Brown 15'	Report		Stadium: EMS Stadium; Attendance: 400; Referee: Mrutyunjay L Amatya; Man of the Match: Thabiso Brown

6 April 2025 22	Gokulam Kerala	3-4	Dempo	Kozhikode
16.00 IST	Thabiso Brown 4', 11', 73'			Stadium: EMS Stadium

=== Indian Super Cup ===
Gokulam Kerala were eliminated in the Round of 16 of the 2025 Super Cup, following a 3–0 defeat to FC Goa in Bhubaneswar.

21 April 2025 1	Goa	3-0	Gokulam Kerala	Bhubaneswar
16:30 IST	Iker Guarrotxena 23' (pen.), 35', 71'	AIFF; I-League		Stadium: Kalinga Stadium; Attendance: 568; Referee: Pratik Mondal; Man of the Match: Iker Guarrotxena (Goa)

== Statistics ==
=== Appearances ===
Players with no appearances are not included on the list.

As of 21 April 2025

No.	Pos.	Nat.	Name	I-League		Super Cup		Total	
No.	Pos.	Nat.	Name	Apps	Starts	Apps	Starts	Apps	Starts
1	GK	(India)	Bishorjit Singh	4	3	0	0	4	3
2	DF	(India)	Salam Ranjan Singh	12	11	1	1	13	12
4	DF	(India)	Athul Unnikrishnan	20	18	1	1	21	19
5	DF	(India)	Nidhin Krishna	21	20	1	1	22	21
6	MF	(India)	Rishad PP	14	6	1	0	15	6
7	MF	(India)	Abhijith Kurungodan	16	11	1	1	17	12
9	FW	(Mali)	Adama Niane	19	11	1	1	20	12
10	MF	(Uruguay)	Martín Cháves	18	14	1	0	19	14
11	FW	(India)	Tharpuia	9	3	0	0	9	3
12	FW	(India)	Senthamil S	3	0	0	0	3	0
12	GK	(India)	Rakshit Dagar	4	4	0	0	4	4
13	DF	(India)	Rahul Khokar	4	0	0	0	4	0
15	FW	(India)	VP Suhair	17	15	0	0	17	15
17	MF	(Spain)	Nacho Abeledo	21	20	1	1	22	21
18	DF	(India)	Laishram Johnson	6	5	1	1	7	6
19	MF	(India)	Emil Benny	5	1	0	0	5	1
21	FW	(Lesotho)	Thabiso Brown	9	7	1	1	10	8
23	MF	(India)	Michael Soosairaj	13	4	0	0	13	4
24	FW	(India)	Ranjeet Pandre	9	1	1	0	10	1
27	MF	(India)	Sebastian Thangmuansang	13	12	0	0	13	12
28	MF	(Spain)	Sergio Llamas	20	20	1	1	21	21
30	DF	(India)	Bibin Ajayan	10	4	0	0	10	4
42	GK	(India)	Shibinraj Kunniyil	16	15	1	1	17	16
66	DF	(India)	Mashoor Shereef	18	16	0	0	18	16
70	FW	(Brazil)	Wander Luiz	1	0	0	0	1	0
77	MF	(India)	Saurav Mandal	7	1	0	0	7	1
93	DF	(India)	Akhil Praveen	6	4	1	0	7	4
95	FW	(Montenegro)	Siniša Stanisavić	12	10	1	1	13	11
99	MF	(India)	Rahul Raju	11	7	0	0	11	7

=== Goal scorers ===
Rank	No.	Pos.	Nat.	Name	I League	Super Cup	Total
1	21	FW	(Lesotho)	Thabiso Brown	11	0	11
2	17	MF	(Spain)	Nacho Abeledo	9	0	9
3	9	FW	(Mali)	Adama Niane	6	0	6
3	95	FW	(Montenegro)	Siniša Stanisavić	5	0	5
5	4	DF	(India)	Athul Unnikrishnan	2	0	2
5	7	MF	(India)	Abhijith kurungodan	2	0	2
5	10	MF	(Uruguay)	Martín Cháves	2	0	2
8	6	MF	(India)	Rishad PP	1	0	1
8	11	FW	(India)	Tharpuia	1	0	1
8	23	FW	(India)	Michael Soosairaj	1	0	1
8	24	FW	(India)	Ranjeet Pandre	1	0	1
8	28	MF	(Spain)	Sergio Llamas	1	0	1
8	66	DF	(India)	Mashoor Shereef	1	0	1
8	99	MF	(India)	Rahul Raju	1	0	1
Own Goals					1	0	1
Total					45	0	45

=== Assists ===
Not all goals have an assist.

Rank	No.	Pos.	Nat.	Name	I League	Super Cup	Total
1	17	MF	(Spain)	Nacho Abeledo	8	0	8
2	28	MF	(Spain)	Sergio Llamas	5	0	5
3	10	FW	(Uruguay)	Martín Cháves	4	0	4
3	15	FW	(India)	VP Suhair	4	0	4
4	9	FW	(Mali)	Adama Niane	2	0	2
6	5	DF	(India)	Nidhin Krishna	1	0	1
6	11	FW	(India)	Tharpuia	1	0	1
6	21	FW	(Lesotho)	Thabiso Brown	1	0	1
6	34	DF	(India)	Laishram Johnson Singh	1	0	1

=== Clean sheets ===
No.	Nation	Name	I-League	Super Cup	Total
42	(India)	Shibinraj Kunniyil	5	0	5
1	(India)	Bishorjit Singh	1	0	1
12	(India)	Rakshit Dagar	1	0	1

=== Disciplinary record ===
As of match played 21 April 2025

No.	Pos.	Name	I League		Super Cup		Total	
No.	Pos.	Name	Booked	Sent off (straight red)	Booked	Sent off (straight red)	Booked	Sent off (straight red)
1	GK	(India) Bishorjit Singh	1	0	0	0	1	0
2	DF	(India) Salam Ranjan Singh	2	1	0	0	2	1
4	DF	(India) Athul Unnikrishnan	2	0	0	0	2	0
5	DF	(India) Nidhin Krishna	4	0	0	0	4	0
5	MF	(India) Abhijith Kurunodan	2	0	0	0	2	0
9	FW	(Mali) Adama Niane	3	0	0	0	3	0
10	MF	(Uruguay) Martín Cháves	5	0	1	0	6	0
11	FW	(India) Tharpuia	2	0	0	0	2	0
15	FW	(India) VP Suhair	2	0	0	0	2	0
17	FW	(Spain) Nacho Abeledo	4	0	0	0	4	0
18	DF	(India) Laishram Johnson	1	0	0	0	1	0
21	FW	(Lesotho) Thabiso Brown	1	0	0	0	1	0
24	FW	(India) Ranjeet Pandre	1	0	0	0	1	0
27	DF	(India) Sebastian Thangmuansang	4	0	0	0	4	0
28	MF	(Spain) Sergio Llamas	5	0	0	0	5	0
30	DF	(India) Bibin Ajayan	2	0	0	0	2	0
42	GK	(India) Shibinraj Kunniyil	1	0	0	0	1	0
66	DF	(India) Mashoor Shereef	5	1	0	0	5	1
99	MF	(India) Rahul Raju	3	0	0	0	3	0
		(Spain) Antonio Rueda	2	0	0	0	2	0
