= 2023–24 Mohammedan SC (Kolkata) season =

Indian football club season

Mohammedan
2023–24 season
- Owner: Mohammedan Sporting Club Private Limited (50%); Bunkerhill Private Limited (50%)
- Chairman: Gulam Ashraf
- Head coach: Andrey Chernyshov
- Stadium: Salt Lake Stadium, Kishore Bharati Krirangan, Bankimanjali Stadium (I-League)
- I-League: 1st (promoted)
- Durand Cup: Group stage
- Top goalscorer: League: Eddie Hernández (13); All: Eddie Hernández (13)
- Biggest win: 6–0 v TRAU (Home); 7 November 2023 (I-League)

The 2023–24 season was the 131st season in the existence of Mohammedan and the club's third consecutive season in the I-League. In addition to the I-League, they also competed in the Durand Cup. On 30th June its confirmed Mohammedan's participation in the Durand cup.

== Staff ==
Position	Staff
Manager	(Russia) Andrey Chernyshov
Assistant Manager	(India) Alison Kharsyntiew
Head of Goalkeeping	(India) Lalit Thapa
Head Physiotherapist	(India) Dibyajit Mitra
Assistant Physiotherapist	(India) Md. Belal Qureshi
Strength & Conditioning Coach	(India) Arsalan Mirza
Performance Analyst	(India) Devrup J. Gupta
Media manager	(India) Koustav Halder

== Squad ==
=== First-team squad ===
As of 30 December 2023

Note: Flags indicate national team as defined under FIFA eligibility rules; some limited exceptions apply. Players may hold more than one non-FIFA nationality.

No.	Pos.	Nation	Player
1	GK	IND	Padam Chettri
3	DF	IND	Dettol Moirangthem (on loan from Classic FA)
4	MF	UZB	Mirjalol Kosimov
5	MF	ARG	Juan Nellar
6	MF	IND	Abhishek Halder
7	FW	IND	Beneston Barretto
10	FW	ARG	Alexis Gómez
11	MF	IND	Wahengbam Angousana
14	DF	IND	Zodingliana Ralte
15	DF	IND	Dipu Halder
16	DF	IND	Mohammed Irshad
19	FW	IND	David Lalhlansanga
20	FW	HON	Eddie Hernández
22	FW	IND	Sagolsem Bikash Singh (on loan from Kerala Blasters)

No.	Pos.	Nation	Player
25	DF	IND	Samad Ali Mallick (captain)
26	MF	IND	Samuel Lalmuanpuia
28	DF	GHA	Joseph Adjei
29	FW	IND	Lalremsanga Fanai (on loan from Rajasthan United)
33	GK	IND	Lalbiakhlua Jongte (on loan from Hyderabad)
34	DF	IND	Vanlalzuidika
47	FW	IND	SK Faiaz
55	DF	IND	Mohammed Jassim
69	GK	IND	Jetli Sorokhaibam
77	FW	RUS	Evgeniy Kozlov
99	MF	IND	Tanmoy Ghosh
—	GK	IND	James Kithan

=== Reserve squad ===
Note: Flags indicate national team as defined under FIFA eligibility rules; some limited exceptions apply. Players may hold more than one non-FIFA nationality.

No.	Pos.	Nation	Player
2	DF	IND	Thokchom James Singh
8	MF	IND	Sujit Singh
13	MF	IND	Abhijit Sarkar
30	MF	IND	Ganesh Besra
36	DF	IND	Deep Biswas

No.	Pos.	Nation	Player
—	GK	IND	Rakibul Mallick
—	DF	IND	Karandeep Singh
—	MF	IND	Meitalkeishangbam Roger
—	MF	IND	Ajay Alex Antonay
—	MF	IND	Laishram Bedashwor Singh
—	FW	IND	Bamiya Samad
—	FW	IND	William Lalgoulien

== Transfers ==
=== Transfers in ===
Date	Position	Nationality	Player	From	Fee	Ref
13 June 2023	FW	(Argentina)	Alexis Gómez	(India) Sudeva Delhi	Free Transfer	
15 June 2023	DF	(India)	Zodingliana Ralte	(India) Aizawl	Free Transfer	
16 June 2023	DF	(India)	Denzil Kharshandi	(India) ARA	Free Transfer	
17 June 2023	GK	(India)	Rakibul Mollick	(India)	Free Transfer	
17 June 2023	MF	(India)	Ganesh Besra	(India) Wari AC	Free Transfer	
17 June 2023	MF	(India)	Bamiya Samad	(India)	Free Transfer	
19 June 2023	FW	(Ghana)	Prince Opoku Agyemang	(Iraq) Duhok SC	Free Transfer	
20 June 2023	MF	(India)	Sujit Singh	(India) The Diamond Rock FC	Free Transfer	
23 June 2023	DF	(Ghana)	Joseph Adjei	(Syria) Al-Ittihad	Free Transfer	
01 July 2023	MF	(India)	Tanmoy Ghosh	(India) Gokulam Kerala	Free Transfer	
07 July 2023	FW	(India)	Beneston Barretto	(India) Dempo	Free Transfer	
07 July 2023	MF	(India)	Meitalkeishangbam Roger	(India) TRAU	Free Transfer	
07 July 2023	FW	(India)	David Lalhlansanga	(India) Aizawl	Free Transfer	
07 July 2023	FW	(India)	Abhijit Sarkar	(India) Real Kashmir	Free Transfer	
06 July 2023	GK	(India)	Padam Chettri	(India) Mumbai Kenkre	Free Transfer	
07 July 2023	DF	(India)	Thokchom James Singh	(India) NEROCA	Free Transfer	
07 July 2023	DF	(India)	Karandeep Singh	(India) Delhi FC	Free Transfer	
07 July 2023	DF	(India)	Deep Biswas	(India) Mohun Bagan B	Free Transfer	
23 July 2023	MF	(Uzbekistan)	Mirjalol Kasimov	(India) NEROCA	Free Transfer	
14 August 2023	MF	(India)	Wahengbam Angousana	(India) East Bengal B	Free Transfer	
20 August 2023	MF	(India)	Mohammed Irshad	(India) NorthEast United	Free Transfer	
24 August 2023	GK	(India)	Jetli Sorokhaibam	(India) Classic FA	Free Transfer	
2 September 2023	MF	(India)	Samuel Lalmuanpuia	(India) Punjab	Free Transfer	
13 September 2023	FW	(Honduras)	Eddie Hernández	(Honduras) Motagua	Free Transfer	
16 September 2023	DF	(India)	Mohammed Jassim	(India) Gokulam Kerala	Free Transfer	
29 September 2023	MF	(Argentina)	Juan Nellar	Free Agent	Free Transfer	
16 January 2024	FW	(Russia)	Evgeniy Kozlov	(Kazakhstan) Atyrau	Free Transfer	
25 January 2024	GK	(India)	James Kithan	(India) Delhi FC	Free Transfer	

=== Loans in ===
Date from	Position	Nationality	Player	From	Date until	Ref.
	GK	(India)	Lalbiakhlua Jongte	(India) Hyderabad	31 May 2024	
27 June 2023	MF	(India)	Sagolsem Bikash Singh	(India) Kerala Blasters	31 May 2024	
06 July 2023	FW	(India)	Lalremsanga Fanai	(India) Rajasthan United	31 May 2024	
24 July 2023	DF	(India)	Dettol Moirangthem	(India) Classic FA	31 May 2024	

=== Loans out ===
Date from	Position	Nationality	Player	To	Date until	Ref

=== Transfers out ===
Date	Position	Nationality	Player	To	Fee	Ref
12 June 2023	DF	(Syria)	Shaher Shaheen		Free Agent	
12 June 2023	MF	(Serbia)	Nikola Stojanović		Free Agent	
12 June 2023	MF	(Nigeria)	Abiola Dauda		Free Agent	
12 June 2023	DF	(Senegal)	Ousmane N'Diaye		Free Agent	
12 June 2023	FW	(Trinidad and Tobago)	Marcus Joseph		Free Agent	
12 June 2023	FW	(Kyrgyzstan)	Mirlan Murzaev	(Vietnam) Hanoi FC	Free Agent	
26 June 2023	DF	(India)	Abhishek Ambekar	(India) Sreenidi Deccan	Free Agent	
29 June 2023	FW	(India)	Azharuddin Mallick	(India) Delhi	Free Agent	
01 July 2023	MF	(India)	Kean Lewis	(India) Sreenidi Deccan	Free Agent	
17 July 2023	DF	(India)	Sairuat Kima	(India) Rajasthan United	Free Agent	
19 July 2023	GK	(India)	Zothanmawia	(India) Gokulam Kerala	Free Agent	
26 August 2023	GK	(India)	Mithun Samanta	(India) TRAU	Free Agent	
1 September 2023	MF	(India)	Christy Molly Davis	(India) Gokulam Kerala	Free Agent	
7 September 2023	DF	(India)	Safiul Rahman	(India) NEROCA	Free Agent	
19 December 2023	FW	(Ghana)	Prince Opoku Agyemang	TBD	Free Agent	
30 December 2023	FW	(India)	Denzil Kharshandi	(India) Shillong Lajong		

== Pre-season and friendlies ==
30 July 2023 Friendly match	Mohammedan SC	1–1	Chennaiyin
16:00 IST	Alexis Gómez 12'		Irfan Yadwad 79'

14 October 2023 Friendly	Mohammedan SC	0–1	Rajasthan United	Delhi
16:00 IST

17 October 2023 Friendly	Mohammedan SC	1–1	Namdhari	Delhi
16:00 IST

20 October 2023 Friendly	Rajasthan United	1–3	Mohammedan SC	Jaipur
15:30 IST

== Competitions ==
=== Overview ===
Competition	First match	Last match	Starting round	Final position	Record							
Competition	First match	Last match	Starting round	Final position	Pld	W	D	L	GF	GA	GD	Win %
I League	29 October 2023	13 April 2024	Match Day 1	Winners	24	15	7	2	44	22	+22	62.50
Durand Cup	5 August 2023	20 August 2023	Group stage	Group stage	3	2	0	1	9	4	+5	66.67
Total					27	17	7	3	53	26	+27	62.96

Last updated: 13 April 2024.
Source: Competitions

=== I-League ===
==== League table ====
Pos	Team	Pld	W	D	L	GF	GA	GD	Pts	Qualification
1	Mohammedan (C, P)	24	15	7	2	44	22	+22	52	Promotion to Indian Super League
2	Sreenidi Deccan	24	14	6	4	54	26	+28	48	
3	Gokulam Kerala	24	12	6	6	55	34	+21	42	
4	Inter Kashi	24	11	8	5	47	41	+6	41	
5	Real Kashmir	24	11	7	6	36	19	+17	40	

Source: I-League
Rules for classification: 1) Points; 2) Head-to-head points; 3) Head-to-head goal difference; 4) Total goal difference; 5) Total number of goals scored; 6) drawing of lots
(Note: Head-to-head record is used only after all the matches between the teams in question have been played).
(C) Champions; (P) Promoted

==== Matches ====
Note: I-League announced the fixtures for the 2023–24 season on 6 October 2023.

29 October 2023 1	Mohammedan	2–1	Aizawl	Naihati
19:00 IST	Samuel Lalmuanpuia 7'; Alexis Gómez 28'	Report	K Lalrinfela 12'	Stadium: Naihati Stadium; Attendance: 4,900; Referee: Joyshing Monsang Thumli; Man of the Match: Alexis Gómez (Mohammedan)

3 November 2023 2	Mohammedan	1–1	Shillong Lajong	Naihati
19:00 IST	David Lalhlansanga 53'	Report	Takuto Miki 45+1'	Stadium: Naihati Stadium; Attendance: 3,786; Referee: Anand Rana; Man of the Match: Daniel Gonçalves(Shillong Lajong)

7 November 2023 3	Mohammedan	6–0	TRAU	Naihati
19:00 IST	David Lalhlansanga 3', 10'; Joseph Adjei 29'; Mirjalol Kosimov 37'; Lalremsanga Fanai 63'; Samuel Lalmuanpuia 90+5'	Report		Stadium: Naihati Stadium; Attendance: 1,773; Referee: Williams Joy Koshy; Man of the Match: Joseph Adjei (Mohammedan)

10 November 2023 4	Delhi	1–2	Mohammedan	Bhaini Sahib
14:00 IST	Bali Gagandeep 90+8'	Report	Gurtej Singh 4' (OG); Lalremsanga Fanai 13'	Stadium: Namdhari Stadium; Man of the Match: Padam Chetri (Mohammedan)

18 November 2023 5	Rajasthan United	1–2	Mohammedan	Hyderabad
19:00 IST	Ragav Gupta 90+4'	Report	Sagolsem Bikash Singh 45+1'; E. Hernández 69'	Stadium: Deccan Arena; Man of the Match: Sagolsem Bikash Singh (Mohammedan)

21 November 2023 6	Inter Kashi	0–2	Mohammedan	Lucknow
14:00 IST		Report	E. Hernández 44'; Wahengbam Angousana 50'	Stadium: Ekana Football Stadium; Man of the Match: Wahengbam Angousana (Mohammedan)

3 December 2023 7	Mohammedan	2–1	Sreenidi Deccan	Naihati
19:00 IST	Kasimov 37'; E. Hernández 60'	Report	William 84' (pen.)	Stadium: Naihati Stadium; Man of the Match: E. Hernández (Mohammedan)

8 December 2023 8	Mohammedan	1–1	Gokulam Kerala	Naihati
19:00 IST	Abdul Hakku 69' (o.g.)	Report	Sreekuttan VS 69'	Stadium: Naihati Stadium; Man of the Match: Mirjalol kasimov (Mohammedan)

13 December 2023 9	Namdhari	0–1	Mohammedan	Bhaini Ala
14:00 IST		Report	Beneston Barretto 81'	Stadium: Namdhari Stadium; Man of the Match: Mirjalol Kasimov (Mohammedan)

17 December 2023 10	Churchill Brothers	0–0	Mohammedan	Vasco
19:00 IST		Report		Stadium: Tilak Maidan; Man of the Match: Padam Chhetri (Mohammedan)

24 December 2023 11	Mohammedan	2–1	NEROCA	Naihati
19:00 IST	David Lalhlansanga 19'; Lalremsanga Fanai 30'	Report		Stadium: Naihati Stadium; Man of the Match: Lalremsanga (Mohammedan)

4 February 2024 12	Mohammedan	0–3	Real Kashmir	Naihati
19:00 IST		Report	Shaher Shaheen 55'; Gnohere Krizo 65', 90+5' (P)	Stadium: Naihati Stadium; Referee: ADITYA PURKAYASTHA

10 February 2024 13	Aizawl	0–0	Mohammedan	Aizawl
19:00 IST				Stadium: Rajiv Gandhi Stadium

13 February 2024 14	Mohammedan	5–1	Rajasthan United	Naihati
19:00 IST	Lalremsanga Fanai 20'; E. Hernández 27', 44', 88'; Kasimov 65' (P)		William P 29'	Stadium: Naihati Stadium; Attendance: 0 Man of the Match: E. Hernández

17 February 2024 15	TRAU	0–2	Mohammedan	Kalyani Stadium
16:30 IST			Hernández 45+1', 90+1'	Stadium: Kalyani; Attendance: 512; Referee: Mrutyunjay L. Amatya; Man of the Match: Eddie Hernández (Mohammedan)

29 February 2024 16	Sreenidi Deccan	1–1	Mohammedan	Hyderabad
16:30 IST	David Castañeda 4'		Mohammed Jassim 84'	Stadium: Deccan Arena

3 March 2024 17	Gokulam Kerala	2–3	Mohammedan	Kozhikode
19:00 IST	Noufal PN 45+1'; Nidhin Krishna 65'		Eddie Hernández 16'; Alexis Gómez 23'; David Lalhlansanga 90+7'	Stadium: EMS Stadium

9 March 2024 18	Mohammedan	3–1	Namdhari	Naihati
19:00 IST	Zodingliana Ralte 38'; Sagolsem Bikash Singh 67', 78'		Imanol Arana 74'	Stadium: Naihati Stadium; Man of the Match: Sagolsem Bikash Singh

12 March 2024 19	Mohammedan	3–2	Churchill Brothers	Naihati
19:00 IST	Eddie Hernández 28', 33'; Lalremsanga Fanai 75'	Report	Stendly Fernandes 10'; Martín Cháves 51'	Stadium: Naihati Stadium; Man of the Match: Eddie Hernández

17 March 2024 20	NEROCA	0–2	Mohammedan	Shillong
16:30 IST			Eddie Hernández 42', 55'	Stadium: SSA Stadium; Man of the Match: Eddie Hernández

23 March 2024 21	Real Kashmir	0–0	Mohammedan	Srinagar
14:00 IST		Report		Stadium: TRC Turf Ground; Attendance: 7,632; Referee: Harish Kundu; Man of the Match: Muhammad Hammad (Real Kashmir)

30 March 2024 22	Mohammedan	1–1	Inter Kashi	Naihati
18:30 IST	Gómez 8'	Report	Barco 83'	Stadium: Naihati Stadium; Attendance: 2,000; Referee: Jehrul Islam; Man of the Match: Mario Barco (Inter Kashi)

6 April 2024 23	Shillong Lajong	1–2	Mohammedan	Shillong
19:00 IST	Tardin 15' (pen.)	Report	Gómez 1'; Kozlov 63'	Stadium: SSA Stadium; Attendance: 7,816; Referee: Senthil Nathan S. Man of the Match: Padam Chettri (Mohammedan)

13 April 2024 24	Mohammedan	1–3	Delhi	Naihati
18:00 IST	Mirjalol Kasimov 90+9'	Report	Kholmurodov 7'; Goyary 31'; Barboza 90+8'	Stadium: Naihati Stadium; Attendance: 24,678; Referee: Jehrul Islam; Man of the Match: Alisher Kholmurodov (Delhi)

=== Group B ===
Pos	Team	Pld	W	D	L	GF	GA	GD	Pts	Qualification	MCI	MSC	JAM	INV
1	Mumbai City	3	3	0	0	12	1	+11	9	Qualify for the knockout stage	—	—	5–0	4–0
2	Mohammedan (H)	3	2	0	1	9	4	+5	6		1–3	—	6–0	2–1
3	Jamshedpur	3	1	0	2	1	11	−10	3		—	—	—	1–0
4	Indian Navy	3	0	0	3	1	7	−6	0		—	—	—	—

Source: Twitter
Rules for classification: Group stage tiebreakers
(H) Hosts

==== Matches ====
5 August 2023 1	Mohammedan	1–3	Mumbai City	Kolkata
16.45 IST	D. Lalhlansanga 42'	Report	Griffiths 12'; Díaz 24'; Chhangte 35'	Stadium: Kishore Bharati Krirangan; Attendance: 3,652; Referee: Harish Kundu; Man of the Match: Alberto Noguera (Mumbai City)

11 August 2023 2	Mohammedan	2–1	Indian Navy	Kolkata
15.00 IST	D. Lalhlansanga 50'; Lalremsanga 69'	Report	Britto 90+7' (pen.)	Stadium: Kishore Bharati Krirangan

20 August 2023 2	Mohammedan	6–0	Jamshedpur	Kolkata
16.45 IST	Lalremsanga 10', 16'; *D. Lalhlansanga 28', 69', 82', 89'	Report		Stadium: Kishore Bharati Krirangan

== Statistics ==
=== Goal scorers ===
As of 13 April 2024

Rank	No.	Pos.	Nat.	Name	I League	Durand cup	Total
1	20	FW	(Honduras)	Eddie Hernández	13	0	13
2	19	FW	(India)	David Lalhlansanga	5	6	11
3	29	FW	(India)	Lalremsanga Fanai	5	3	8
4	4	MF	(Uzbekistan)	Mirjalol Kosimov	4	0	4
4	10	FW	(Argentina)	Alexis Gómez	4	0	4
6	22	MF	(India)	Sagolsem Bikash Singh	3	0	3
7	26	MF	(India)	Samuel Lalmuanpuia	2	0	2
8	7	FW	(India)	Beneston Barretto	1	0	1
8	11	DF	(India)	Wahengbam Angousana	1	0	1
8	14	DF	(India)	Zodingliana Ralte	1	0	1
8	28	DF	(Ghana)	Joseph Adjei	1	0	1
8	55	DF	(India)	Mohammed Jassim	1	0	1
8	77	FW	(Russia)	Evgeniy Kozlov	1	0	1
Own Goals					2	0	2
Total					44	9	53
