= Shirui Lily Cup =

- Organiser(s): Ukhrul District Sports Association (UDSA)
- Founded: 1973; 53 years ago
- Region: India
- Teams: 10
- Current champions: Sagolband United

Shirui Lily Cup, also known as the Shirui Lily National Level Football Knockout Cup, is an Indian football tournament held in Ukhrul and organized by Ukhrul District Sports Association (UDSA).

== History ==
The Shirui Lily Cup has been held under the aegis of Ukhrul DSA and is named after the State Flower of Manipur Shirui Lily. The tournament was first held in 1973 as a district level tournament. The next year, it was made a state level tournament by AMFA and eventually designated an All India national level competition by AIFF in 2005.

Ukhrul District Sports Association had announced that the 29th edition of the Shirui Lily Cup football tournament was going to be held from November 22 to December 4, 2021.

== Venue ==
The competition is held at Tangkhul Naga Long Ground at Ukhrul.

== Results ==
List of Shirui Lily Cup Finals
Edition	Year	Winners	Score	Runners-up	Ref.
25th	2004	Eastern Sporting Union	1–0	Youth Social Welfare Association	
26th	2005	TRUGPU, Nambol	1–0	Lenali, Churachandpur	
27th	2008				
28th	2011	AIM, Khabam	0–0 (4–3 p)	NEROCA	
29th	2021	Shillong Lajong	4–3	KLASA	
30th	2023	Sagolband United	2–2 (13–12 p)	YOSC Khurai	
