= 2025–26 Odisha FC season =

Odisha
2025–26 season
- Owner: GMS Inc.
- CEO: Vacant
- Head coach: T. G. Purushothaman
- Stadium: Kalinga Stadium
- Indian Super League: 11th
- Top goalscorer: League: Suhair Vadakkepeedika (4); All: Suhair Vadakkepeedika (4)
- Highest home attendance: 3,218 (vs Chennaiyin, 1 March 2026)
- Lowest home attendance: 2,421 (vs Inter Kashi, 24 February 2026)
- Average home league attendance: 2,772
| Home colours | Away colours |

The 2025–26 season was Odisha Football Club's seventh professional season in the Indian Super League since the club's establishment in 2019. The season was heavily disrupted by uncertainty surrounding the organisation of the Indian Super League, with the league eventually being reduced to a 14-team, 13-match-per-club format and beginning in February 2026 rather than its customary late-year start.

Odisha entered the season following a prolonged period of uncertainty. The club did not participate in the 2025 Durand Cup or the 2025–26 AIFF Super Cup, and preparations for the ISL campaign were significantly delayed. Head coach Sergio Lobera, who had guided the club since 2023, departed by mutual agreement in December 2025 after the club had initially been expected to continue under him.

Former Kerala Blasters FC assistant and interim head coach T. G. Purushothaman was subsequently appointed as Odisha's head coach in February 2026. The appointment made Purushothaman the first full-time Malayali head coach of an Indian Super League club. He inherited a substantially reshaped squad, with several of Odisha's established foreign players departing during the prolonged off-season. Carlos Delgado was the only foreign player retained for the campaign.

Odisha's opening fixture against Punjab FC was postponed, meaning their campaign eventually began on 24 February 2026 against newly promoted Inter Kashi FC at the Kalinga Stadium. The match ended goalless, with Rahul KP named Player of the Match. Odisha subsequently recorded their first victory of the campaign on 20 March, defeating NorthEast United FC 4–1 in Guwahati.

Despite a number of promising performances, Odisha struggled for consistency throughout the shortened campaign. They finished 11th in the league with 11 points from 13 matches, recording two wins, five draws and six defeats. The team scored 14 goals and conceded 22, leaving them with a goal difference of −8.

Suhair Vadakkepeedika finished as Odisha's leading scorer with four league goals, while Rahim Ali scored three. Rahul KP scored twice, with Carlos Delgado, K. Lalrinfela, Subham Bhattacharya and Kartik Hantal also finding the net during the campaign. Lalthathanga Khawlhring and K. Lalrinfela were the club's leading providers with three assists each, while Rahim Ali contributed two assists.

The campaign was also notable for Odisha's reliance on a largely Indian squad following the departure of several established foreign players. The team showed resilience in several matches, including a 1–1 draw against Chennaiyin FC on 1 March, a 1–1 draw against Bengaluru FC on 4 May and a 0–0 draw against Jamshedpur FC on the final matchday.

Odisha's final match of the season was a 0–0 draw away to Jamshedpur FC on 21 May 2026. The result confirmed an 11th-place finish for the club, bringing an unusually disrupted campaign to an end.
