= Thabiso Brown =

Mosotho footballer (born 1995)

Personal information
- Full name: Thabiso Nelson Brown
- Date of birth: 3 October 1995 (age 31)
- Place of birth: Mashaleng, Lesotho
- Height: 1.71 m (5 ft 7 in)
- Position: Striker

Team information
- Current team: Real Kashmir
- Number: 11

Youth career
- 2009: Sky Battalion
- 2010: Majantja
- 2011: Sky Battalion
- 2013: Super Kingdom

Senior career*
Years	Team	Apps	(Gls)
2013–2017	Kick 4 Life F.C.	54	(22)
2017–2018	JCDT Bolivia FC		
2018	Deportivo Sur-Car	11	(10)
2019	Empresa Minera Huanuni	30	(41)
2020	Deportivo FATIC		
2020	Pirata	7	(1)
2021	Empresa Minera Huanuni	11	(13)
2022	Aurora	14	(2)
2022	Real Oruro	6	(9)
2023	Dandong Tengyue	25	(7)
2024	Jiangxi Lushan	30	(8)
2025	Gokulam Kerala	9	(11)
2025	Boeung Ket	3	(0)
2025–2026	Gokulam Kerala	4	(1)
2026–	Real Kashmir		

International career^{‡}
2014–2015	Lesotho U20	4	(5)
2015–	Lesotho	15	(1)
- * Club domestic league appearances and goals as of 23:09, 20 March 2026 (UTC) ‡ National team caps and goals as of 23:30, 9 September 2025 (UTC)

Thabiso Nelson Brown (born 3 October 1995) is a Mosotho professional footballer who plays as a forward for Indian Football League club Real Kashmir and the Lesotho national football team.

== Club career ==
In April 2023, Thabiso joined China League One club Dandong Tengyue.

On 20 February 2024, Thabiso joined fellow China League One club Jiangxi Lushan.

On 7 February 2025, Brown made his debut for I-League club Gokulam Kerala in a 2–1 loss against Churchill Brothers.

== International career ==
=== Youth ===
Thabiso was the top scorer of the 2015 African U-20 Championship qualification. He scored 5 goals in 4 matches for the Lesotho national under-20 team.

=== Senior ===
Thabiso made his international debut for Lesotho against Angola in a 4–0 loss in the 2015 Africa Cup of Nations qualification. On 4 July 2015, he scored his first international goal against Botswana in a 1–1 draw in the 2016 African Nations Championship qualification.

== Career statistics ==
=== Club ===
As of match played 21 April 2025

Appearances and goals by club, season and competition
Club	Season	League			National cup (Note: Includes Chinese FA Cup, Super Cup)		Continental		Total	
Club	Season	Division	Apps	Goals	Apps	Goals	Apps	Goals	Apps	Goals
Pirata	2020	Liga 2	7	1	—		—		7	1
Aurora	2022	Bolivian Primera División	14	2	—		—		14	2
Dandong Tengyue	2023	China League One	25	7	1	0	—		26	7
Jiangxi Lushan	2024	China League One	30	8	1	0	—		31	8
Gokulam Kerala	2024–25	I-League	9	11	1	0	—		10	11
Career total			85	29	3	0	0	0	88	29

=== International ===
As of match played 9 September 2025

Appearances and goals by national team and year
National team	Year	Apps	Goals
Lesotho	2014	1	0
Lesotho	2015	3	1
Lesotho	2016	2	0
Lesotho	2017	2	0
Lesotho	2021	4	0
Lesotho	2023	2	0
Lesotho	2024	1	0
Total		15	1

As of match played 9 September 2024
Lesotho score listed first, score column indicates score after each Brown goal

List of international goals scored by Thabiso Brown
No.	Date	Venue	Cap	Opponent	Score	Result	Competition
1	4 July 2015	Botswana National Stadium, Gaborone, Botswana	3	Botswana	1–0	1–1	2016 African Nations Championship qualification
