= Kelechi Okoye =

Former Nigerian footballer

Personal information
- Full name: Kelechi Okoye-Ahaneku
- Date of birth: 28 May 1984 (age 42)
- Place of birth: Jos, Nigeria
- Height: 1.80 m (5 ft 11 in)
- Position: Midfielder

Youth career
- Mighty Jets
- Gombe United

Senior career*
Years	Team	Apps	(Gls)
2000	Gombe United		
2001–2002	Heartland F.C.		
2003–2004	Lobi Stars		
2004–2009	JUTH FC		
2010–11	Shillong Lajong FC	44	(16)
2013–2023	Rangdajied United		

International career
- Nigeria U20
2001	Nigeria	3	(0)
- * Club domestic league appearances and goals

Kelechi Okoye-Ahaneku (born 28 May 1984) was a Nigerian football player, who last played for Rangdajied United in the I-League 2nd Division in India.

== International career ==
He was the Captain of the Nigeria national under-20 football team in 2004 and represented the Super Eagles.

== Personal life ==
His nephew, Liam Adebayo-Balogun, played for the PSV Eindhoven under-16 squad.
