= Alison Kharsyntiew =

Indian former footballer

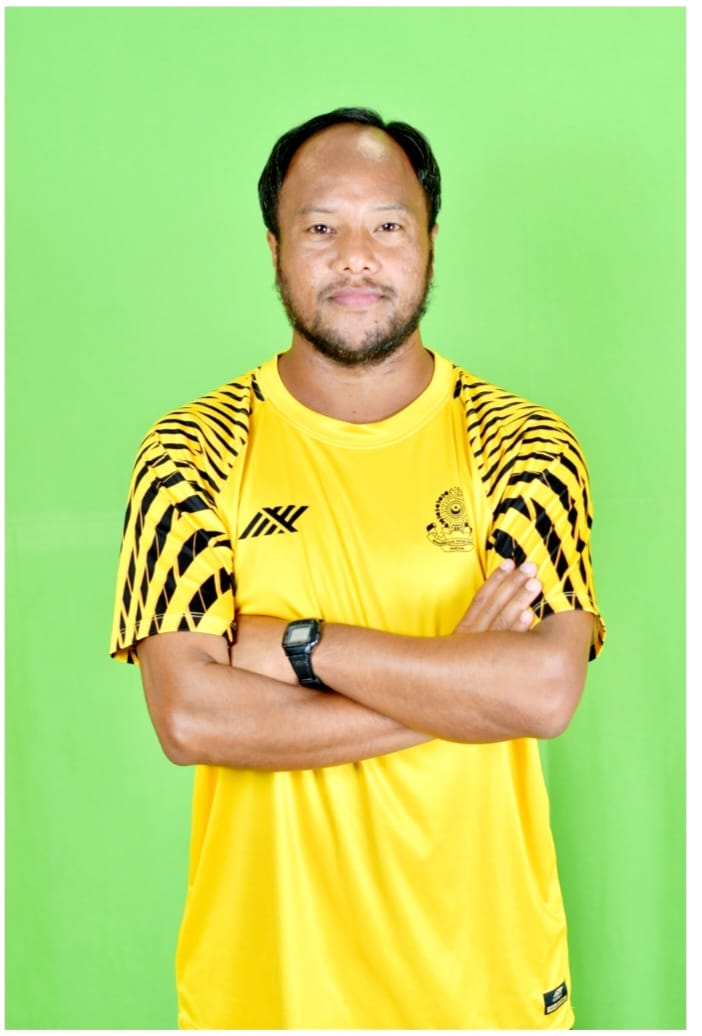
- Alison Kharsyntiew in Mohammedan SC (2023)

Personal information
- Full name: Alison Kharsyntiew
- Date of birth: 17 February 1987 (age 39)
- Place of birth: Shillong, Meghalaya, India
- Position: Goalkeeper

Youth career
- Shillong Lajong

Senior career*
Years	Team	Apps	(Gls)
2005–2017	Shillong Lajong	325	(2)

International career
2007–2012	India	6	(0)

Managerial career
- 2018–2020: Shillong Lajong
- 2020–2022: NorthEast United (assistant)
- 2023–2025: Mohammedan (assistant, academy)
- 2025–: Siang Warriors
- * Club domestic league appearances and goals

Alison Kharsyntiew is an Indian former professional football player.

== Coaching career ==
After having his playing career cut short due to injury, Kharsyntiew went into coaching at the age of 19. He started his coaching career with Shillong Lajong, serving as an academy coach, before being promoted to lead the club's reserves in the Shillong Premier League. He led the reserves to the Shillong Premier League title in 2014. Kharsyntiew also worked as an assistant with Shillong Lajong's first-team, serving as assistant for Bobby Nongbet during the 2017–18 season.

=== Shillong Lajong: 2018–2020 ===
Following the 2017–18 I-League season, Kharsyntiew was appointed as interim head coach of Shillong Lajong for the Super Cup, following the dismissal of Bobby Nongbet. His first game in charge was on 4 April 2018 against Indian Super League side, Pune City. Despite going down by two goals early in the match, Shillong Lajong came back to win the match 3–2.

Going into the 2018–19 season, Kharsyntiew was announced as the club's head coach. His first league match in charge was on 28 October 2018 against Aizawl. A brace from Naorem Mahesh Singh saw Shillong Lajong win 2–1.

=== NorthEast United FC: 2020–2022 ===
On 6 December 2020, Alison was appointed as the assistant head coach of NorthEast United for the 2020–21 ISL season. He joined the likes of Khalid Jamil in leading Northeast United to third place finish in the league.

=== Mohammedan SC: 2023–present ===
Alison Kharsyntiew transitioned from Head Coach of the Mohammedan Sporting Club reserve team to Assistant Coach of the senior squad. His coaching background includes roles in youth development and senior team strategic planning. During his tenure, Kharsyntiew has worked across multiple levels of the club's competitive structure.

== Statistics ==
=== Managerial statistics ===
As of 3 November 2018.

Team	From	To	Record				
Team	From	To	G	W	D	L	Win %
(India) Shillong Lajong	April 2018	2020	14	2	1	11	14.29
Total			14	2	1	11	14.29
