= David Lalhlansanga =

Indian footballer (born 2003)

Personal information
- Date of birth: 27 November 2001 (age 24)
- Place of birth: Mizoram, India
- Position: Forward

Team information
- Current team: East Bengal
- Number: 14

Youth career
- 2019–2020: Aizawl

Senior career*
Years	Team	Apps	(Gls)
2020–2023	Aizawl	26	(5)
2023–2024	Mohammedan	22	(5)
2024–	East Bengal	17	(4)

International career^{‡}
2026–	India	1	(0)
- * Club domestic league appearances and goals as of 12:15, 16 February 2025 (UTC) ‡ National team caps and goals as of 23:14, 12 November 2026 (UTC)

David Lalhlansanga Hmar (born 27 November 2001) is an Indian professional footballer who plays as a forward for Indian Super League club East Bengal and the India national team.

== Club career ==
=== Aizawl ===
David made his professional debut for Aizawl in the I-League in the 2020–21 season. He scored 5 goals in 26 appearances for Aizawl in the I-League.

=== Mohammedan Sporting ===
In 2023, David signed for Kolkata giant Mohammedan SC and became the top scorer of the 2023 CFL Premier Division with 23 goals as Mohammedan won the title. He also won Golden Boot(top scorer) of the 2023 Durand Cup with 6 goals in just three matches. David won the 2023–24 I-League with Mohammedan Sporting helping them earn a promotion to the Indian Super League. David also received the AIFF Emerging Player of the Year award for his performance in the 2023–24 season.

=== East Bengal ===
On 18 June 2024, it was announced that David has signed on a three-year contract with another Kolkata giant East Bengal.

== International career ==
David was called up for the Indian national football team camp for the 2026 FIFA World Cup Qualifier match against Kuwait in May 2024, and got selected in the 27-member squad for the match against Kuwait.

== Career statistics ==
=== Club ===
As of 8 October 2025

Club	Season	League			Cup		Others		AFC		Total	
Club	Season	Division	Apps	Goals	Apps	Goals	Apps	Goals	Apps	Goals	Apps	Goals
Aizawl	2020–21	I-League	3	1	–						3	1
Aizawl	2021–22	I-League	14	2	–						14	2
Aizawl	2022–23	I-League	9	2	4 (Note: Appearances in the Super Cup.)	1	–				13	3
Aizawl	Aizawl total		26	5	4	1	0	0	0	0	30	6
Mohammedan Sporting	2023–24	I-League	22	5	3 (Note: Appearances in the Durand Cup.)	6	17 (Note: Appearances in the Calcutta Football League.)	23	–		42	34
East Bengal	2024–25	Indian Super League	17	4	4 (Note: Three appearances in the Durand Cup and One appearance(s) in the Super Cup.)	1	1	0	3 (Note: One Appearance(s) in the AFC Champions League Two and Two Appearances in the AFC Challenge League.)	1	25	6
East Bengal	2025–26	Indian Super League	0	0	5 (Note: Four appearances in Durand Cup and One appearance(s) in the IFA Shield)	1	8	5	—		13	6
East Bengal	East Bengal total		17	4	9	2	9	5	3	1	38	12
Career total			65	14	16	9	26	28	3	1	110	52

== Honours ==
Mohammedan Sporting

- I-League: 2023–24
- Calcutta Football League: 2023

East Bengal

- Indian Super League: 2025-26
- Calcutta Football League: 2024, 2025

Individual

- Calcutta Football League Golden boot: 2023
- Durand Cup Golden boot: 2023
- AIFF Emerging Player of the Year: 2023–24
- ISL Fan's goal of the week: 2024–25 Week 13, 2024–25 Week 15
