= José Luis Moreno =

Colombian footballer (born 1996)

Personal information
- Full name: José Luis Moreno Peña
- Date of birth: October 22, 1996 (age 30)
- Place of birth: Jamundí, Colombia
- Height: 1.83 m (6 ft 0 in)
- Position: Defender

Team information
- Current team: Dempo
- Number: 3

Youth career
- –2014: Once Caldas

Senior career*
Years	Team	Apps	(Gls)
2014–2019	Once Caldas	74	(5)
2015–2016	→ Valencia Mestalla (loan)	3	(0)
2019	Millonarios	5	(1)
2020–2021	River Plate Asunción	4	(1)
2021–2022	Patriotas Boyacá	18	(1)
2022–2023	Metropolitanos	11	(0)
2024	Gokulam Kerala	0	(0)
2025–2026	Churchill Brothers	11	(2)
2026–	Dempo	1	(0)
- * Club domestic league appearances and goals as of 8 March 2026

José Luis Moreno Peña (born 22 October 1996) is a Colombian professional footballer who plays as a defender for Indian Football League club Dempo.

== Career ==
In 2015, Moreno was sent on loan to the reserves of Spanish La Liga side Valencia from Once Caldas in the Colombian top flight.

For the 2020 season, he signed for Paraguayan club River Plate Asunción. He remained there until 2023, when he moved to Venezuelan Club Metropolitanos.
