= Erol Akbay =

Dutch football manager (born 1966)

Personal information
- Full name: Erool Akbay
- Date of birth: 20 December 1966 (age 59)
- Place of birth: Denizli, Turkey

Team information
- Current team: Rahmatganj (manager)

Youth career
- Years: Team
- HVV Hengelo

Managerial career
- 2016-2017: The Highlanders
- 2019: Ngezi Platinum
- 2019: Tshakhuma
- 2023: Aizawl
- 2024-: Rahmatganj

Erol Akbay (born 20 December 1966) is a Dutch football manager who most recently managed Bangladesh Premier League club Rahmatganj MFS.

== Early life ==
Akbay was born in 1966 in Turkey and moved with his family from Denizli, Turkey, to the Netherlands at the age of seven and started playing football with Dutch side HVV Hengelo before starting his managerial career at the age of thirty-one.

== Career ==
Akbay has been regarded as a controversial manager in Zimbabwean league football. In 2015, he applied to become manager of the Rwanda national football team after working as a youth manager and scout in the Netherlands. In 2016, he was appointed manager of Zimbabwean side Highlanders. He helped the club win against Dynamos for the first time in ten seasons. He helped the club achieve third place. However, he left the club on poor terms and vowed to never manage them again. In 2019, he was appointed manager of Zimbabewean side Ngezi Platinum. He was tasked with helping the club win the league. After that, he was appointed manager of South African side TTM. He managed the club for three games. After that, he returned to the Netherlands.

== Tactics ==
Akbay has been regarded as "known for a fast paced brand of football".

== Personal life ==
Akbay has been married and has two children. Besides working as a football manager, Akbay has also worked as a banker.
