= Bobby Nongbet =

Indian football manager

Personal information
- Full name: Bobby Lyngdoh Nongbet
- Place of birth: Shillong, India

Managerial career
- Years: Team
- 2017–2018: Shillong Lajong
- 2020–2022: Meghalaya
- 2022–2024: Shillong Lajong

Bobby Lyngdoh Nongbet (born 11 November 1981) is an Indian professional football manager.

== Coaching career ==
=== Youth coach ===
Bobby Nongbet began his career as youth coach at Shillong Lajong and Royal Wahingdoh. In 2015, Nonbget passed AFC 'A' certification course.

=== Shillong Lajong ===
Nongbet was appointed as the head coach for 2017–18 I-League season. In 2022, he returned to Shillong Lajong in the same post. He guided the team in 2022–23 I-League 2, earned promotion to the 2023–24 I-League, thereby securing promotion into India's second tier after a gap of four years. I-League began in November, in which his team began the campaign with a 1–1 draw against Mohammedan Sporting on 3 November.
