= 2021–22 Aizawl FC season =

Indian football club season

Aizawl
2021–22 season
- Chairman: Robert Romawia Royte
- Manager: Yan Law
- Stadium: Rajiv Gandhi Stadium
- I-League: TBD
- Mizoram Premier League: TBD
- Indian Super Cup: TBD
Home colours	Away colours

The 2021–22 season is Aizawl's 38th competitive season and its fifth competitive season in the I-League, India's top-flight professional football league.

== Squad Information ==
As of 2 September 2021

Note: Flags indicate national team as defined under FIFA eligibility rules; some limited exceptions apply. Players may hold more than one non-FIFA nationality.

No.	Pos.	Nation	Player
1	GK	IND	Lalremruata Arema
7	MF	IND	Lal Hmangaihkima
8	MF	IND	Joseph Vanlalhruaia
9	FW	IND	Lalliansanga
11	FW	IND	Haunhar Lalmuankima
13	MF	IND	Lalrammawia Rammawia
14	MF	IND	Ayush Chhetri
17	MF	IND	Ramhlunchhunga
20	MF	LBR	Alfred Jaryan (captain)
23	MF	ARG	Matías Verón
24	DF	IND	Chawnghlut Lalrosanga
26	DF	IND	K. Lalmalsawma
29	FW	IND	F. Lalremsanga
31	GK	IND	Lalmuansanga
39	MF	IND	Lalengmawia
44	GK	IND	Lalthakima Ralte

No.	Pos.	Nation	Player
—	DF	IND	Lalmuanzova
—	FW	IND	R.Lalthanmawia
—	GK	IND	Anuj Kumar (on loan from Hyderabad)
—	GK	IND	Vanlahriatpuia
—	DF	IND	Merloy Laldinsanga

== Extended contracts ==
Date	Position	Player	Ref
1 September 2021	MF	(Liberia) Alfred Jaryan	
2 September 2021	FW	(India) Lalliansanga	
2 September 2021	FW	(India) Joseph Vanlalhruaia	
2 September 2021	DF	(India) K. Lalmalsawma	
2 September 2021	MF	(India) Lalengmawia	
2 September 2021	FW	(India) Lalmuanzova	
2 September 2021	FW	(India) F. Lalremsanga	
2 September 2021	GK	(India) Lalthakima Ralte	
2 September 2021	MF	(India) Ramhlunchhunga	
2 September 2021	MF	(India) Lal Hmangaihkima	

== Transfers ==
=== In ===
No.	Position	Player	Previous club	Date	Ref
23	MF	(Argentina) Matías Verón	(Spain) Guadix CF	3 September 2021	
9	FW	(India) Lalliansanga	(India) Gokulam Kerala FC	3 September 2021	
	FW	(India) R.Lalthanmawia		6 September 2021	

=== Loans in ===
Date from	Position	Nationality	Name	From	Date until	Ref.
21 August 2021	GK	(India)	Anuj Kumar	(India) Hyderabad FC	31 May 2022	

=== Out ===
No.	Position	Player	To	Date	Ref
21	GK	Zothanmawia	Mohammedan	26 July 2021	
	FW	Mc Malsawmzuala	(India) Sreenidi Deccan	31 July 2021	
	DF	Lalchungnunga	(India) Sreenidi Deccan	10 August 2021	
4	DF	PC Laldinpuia	(India) Jamshedpur FC	25 August 2021	
6	DF	Vanlalzuidika Chhakchhuak	Sudeva Delhi	1 September 2021	
	DF	Lalmawizuala	Delhi FC	1 September 2021	
22	FW	David Lalthansanga	Forward FC	1 September 2021	
15	FW	Bawlte Rohmingthanga	Real Kashmir	11 November 2021	

=== Loans Out ===
Date from	Position	Nationality	Name	to	Date until	Ref.
21 August 2021	MF	(Liberia)	Alfred Jaryan	(India) Aryan		

== Technical staff ==
Position	Name
Head coach	(India) Yan Law
Assistant coach	
Assistant coach	
Goalkeeping coach	

== Competitions ==
=== Overview ===
Competition	First match	Last match	Final position	Record							
Competition	First match	Last match	Final position	Pld	W	D	L	GF	GA	GD	Win %
I League	TBD	TBD		0	0	0	0	0	0	+0	—
Super Cup	TBD	TBD	-	0	0	0	0	0	0	+0	—
Total				0	0	0	0	0	0	+0	—

Last updated: 23 September 2021.
Source: Competitions

=== I-League ===
==== League table ====
Pos	Team	Pld	W	D	L	GF	GA	GD	Pts	Qualification
8	Real Kashmir	12	2	7	3	18	22	−4	13	Relegation stage
9	TRAU	12	3	3	6	12	15	−3	12	Relegation stage
10	Aizawl	12	4	0	8	15	19	−4	12	Relegation stage
11	Sudeva Delhi	12	2	4	6	9	16	−7	10	Relegation stage
12	Indian Arrows	12	2	3	7	6	20	−14	9	Relegation stage

Source: Hero I-League
Rules for classification: 1) points; 2) head-to-head points; 3) head-to-head goal difference; 4) goal difference; 5) number of goals scored; 6) drawing of lots

Pos	Team	Pld	W	D	L	GF	GA	GD	Pts	Qualification
1	Gokulam Kerala	18	13	4	1	44	15	+29	43	Champions and qualification for the play–offs for 2023–24 AFC Cup group stage spot
2	Mohammedan	18	11	4	3	34	18	+16	37	
3	Sreenidi Deccan	18	9	5	4	27	19	+8	32	
4	Churchill Brothers	18	9	3	6	24	22	+2	30	
5	RoundGlass Punjab	18	8	4	6	33	29	+4	28	
6	Rajasthan United	18	5	7	6	16	16	0	22	
7	NEROCA	18	4	8	6	21	30	−9	20	

Source: Hero I-League
Rules for classification: 1) points; 2) head-to-head points; 3) head-to-head goal difference; 4) goal difference; 5) number of goals scored; 6) drawing of lots

Pos	Team	Pld	W	D	L	GF	GA	GD	Pts
1	Aizawl	17	7	0	10	23	26	−3	21
2	TRAU	17	4	6	7	15	17	−2	18
3	Indian Arrows	17	4	5	8	10	23	−13	17 (Note: Head-to-head standings: Indian Arrows 4 points, Sudeva Delhi 1 point.)
4	Sudeva Delhi	17	4	5	8	13	23	−10	17
5	Real Kashmir	17	2	8	7	23	31	−8	14

Source: Hero I-League
Rules for classification: 1) points; 2) head-to-head points; 3) head-to-head goal difference; 4) goal difference; 5) number of goals scored; 6) drawing of lots
Notes:

Pos	Team	Pld	W	D	L	GF	GA	GD	Pts
6	Rajasthan United	18	5	7	6	16	16	0	22
7	NEROCA	18	4	8	6	21	30	−9	20
8	Aizawl	17	7	0	10	23	26	−3	21
9	TRAU	17	4	6	7	15	17	−2	18
10	Indian Arrows	17	4	5	8	10	23	−13	17

Source: Hero I-League
Rules for classification: 1) points; 2) head-to-head points; 3) head-to-head goal difference; 4) goal difference; 5) number of goals scored; 6) drawing of lots
