= Eddie Hernández =

Honduran footballer (born 1991)

Personal information
- Full name: Eddie Gabriel Hernández Padilla
- Date of birth: 27 February 1991 (age 35)
- Place of birth: Trujillo, Honduras
- Height: 1.91 m (6 ft 3 in)
- Position: Forward

Team information
- Current team: Municipal

Senior career*
Years	Team	Apps	(Gls)
2007–2012	Platense	76	(33)
2012	→ BK Häcken (loan)	0	(0)
2013–2017	Motagua	61	(23)
2014	→ Vida (loan)	32	(22)
2015	→ Correcaminos UAT (loan)	16	(4)
2016	→ Qingdao Jonoon (loan)	23	(7)
2017	→ Deportes Tolima (loan)	1	(0)
2018	Irtysh Pavlodar	8	(1)
2018–2019	Zob Ahan	13	(3)
2019	Vida	16	(5)
2019–2022	Olimpia	64	(25)
2022	Motagua	32	(9)
2023	Mohammedan	21	(13)
2024–2025	Olancho	13	(5)
2025-	Municipal	0	(0)

International career^{‡}
2010–2011	Honduras U20	17	(4)
2012	Honduras U23	5	(2)
2011–	Honduras	29	(8)
- * Club domestic league appearances and goals as of 6 April 2024 ‡ National team caps and goals as of 21 March 2025

Eddie Gabriel Hernández Padilla (Latin American Spanish: [ˈeðjeɾˈnandes]; born 27 February 1991) is a Honduran professional footballer who plays as a forward for Liga Nacional club Municipal and the Honduras national team.

== Club career ==
A tall striker, Hernández started his career at Platense and joined Swedish Allsvenskan side BK Häcken on loan for the 2012 season, but in June 2012 El Cañonero del Aguán joined Motagua for the 2012 Apertura season.

On 9 March 2018, Irtysh Pavlodar announced the signing of Hernández. On 13 June 2018, Irtysh Pavlodar announced that Hernández had left the club by mutual consent.

On 13 September 2023, it was announced by the Indian I-League club Mohammedan Sporting that they have signed Hernández on a season-long deal.

== International career ==
Hernández made his debut for Honduras in a May 2011 friendly match against El Salvador. He represented his country at the 2012 Summer Olympics and was a non-playing squad member at the 2011 CONCACAF Gold Cup.

== Career statistics ==
=== Club ===
As of match played 15 September 2024

Appearances and goals by club, season and competition
Club	Season	League			National cup (Note: Includes Copa MX, Kazakhstan Cup)		Continental		Total	
Club	Season	Division	Apps	Goals	Apps	Goals	Apps	Goals	Apps	Goals
Vida	2013–14	Liga Nacional	17	8			–		17	8
Vida	2014–15	Liga Nacional	15	14			–		15	14
Vida	Total		32	22			0	0	32	22
Correcaminos UAT	2014–15	Ascenso MX	16	4	4	2	–		20	6
Montagua	2015–16	Liga Nacional	18	11			–		18	11
Deportes Tolima	2017	Categoría Primera A	1	0	–		–		1	0
Montagua	2017–18	Liga Nacional	9	5			0	0	9	5
Irtysh	2018	Kazakhstan Premier League	8	1	2	0	–		10	1
Zob Ahan	2018–19	Persian Gulf Pro League	13	3			–		13	3
Vida	2018–19	Liga Nacional	16	5			–		16	5
Olimpia	2019–20	Liga Nacional	13	6			1 (Note: Appearance in CONCACAF League)	0	14	6
Olimpia	2020–21	Liga Nacional	21	11			5 (Note: Three appearances in CONCACAF League, two appearances in CONCACAF Champions Cup)	0	26	11
Olimpia	2021–22	Liga Nacional	30	8			1	2	31	10
Olimpia	Total		64	25			7	2	71	27
Montagua	2022–23	Liga Nacional	32	9			9 (Note: Five appearances and one goal in CONCACAF League, four appearances and one goal in CONCACAF Champions Cup)	2	41	11
Mohammedan	2023–24	I-League	5	0	0	–		21	13	
Olancho	2024–25	Liga Nacional	5	13			–		4	3
Career total			218	96	6	2	16	4	240	102

=== International ===
Scores and results list Honduras' goal tally first.

N.	Date	Venue	Opponent	Score	Result	Competition
1	3 November 2016	Estadio Olímpico Metropolitano, San Pedro Sula, Honduras	Belize	2–0	5–0	Friendly
2	3 November 2016	Estadio Olímpico Metropolitano, San Pedro Sula, Honduras	Belize	3–0	5–0	Friendly
3	15 November 2016	Estadio Olímpico Metropolitano, San Pedro Sula, Honduras	Trinidad and Tobago	3–1	3–1	2018 FIFA World Cup qualification
4	13 January 2017	Estadio Rommel Fernández, Panama City, Panama	Nicaragua	1–1	2–1	2017 Copa Centroamericana
5	17 January 2017	Estadio Rommel Fernández, Panama City, Panama	Panama	1–0	1–0	2017 Copa Centroamericana
6	22 January 2017	Estadio Rommel Fernández, Panama City, Panama	Belize	1–0	1–0	2017 Copa Centroamericana
7	7 October 2017	Estadio Nacional de Costa Rica, San José, Costa Rica	Costa Rica	1–0	1–1	2018 FIFA World Cup qualification
8	16 March 2025	Chase Stadium, Fort Lauderdale, United States	Guatemala	1–0	1–2	Friendly

== Honours ==
Mohammedan

- I-League: 2023–24
