= K. Lalrinfela =

Indian footballer (born 2000)

- Mafela, Indian footballer from Peniel Veng, Hnahthial, Mizoram

Personal information
- Full name: Khiangte Lalrinfela
- Date of birth: 11 March 2000 (age 26)
- Place of birth: Hnahthial, Mizoram, India
- Height: 1.80 m (5 ft 11 in)
- Position: Attacking midfielder

Team information
- Current team: Odisha
- Number: 25

Youth career
- 2015–2016: Mohun Bagan U18
- 2017–2019: Bengaluru U18

Senior career*
Years	Team	Apps	(Gls)
2019–2020	Bengaluru B	1	(0)
2021–2022	Ramhlun North	7	
2022	Ramkrishna Club	12	
2022	Swaraj FC	15	
2022–2024	Aizawl	41	(3)
2024–2025	Mohammedan	11	(0)
2025–	Odisha	15	(1)
- * Club domestic league appearances and goals as of 22:53, 5 November 2026 (UTC)

In a football match between SC Delhi and Odisha FC on 8th May 2026, K.Lalrinfela was named Player of the Match

Khiangte Lalrinfela (born 11 March 2000), commonly known by his nickname Mafela, is an Indian professional footballer who plays as a midfielder for Indian Super League club Odisha.

== Career ==
=== Early career ===
Mafela (Lalrinfela Khiangte) was born on 11 March 2000 in Hnahthial ([hnahˈthial]), Mizoram, to Mizo parents K. Lalhunmawia and Vanlalfakawmi. He began his youth career at Mohun Bagan Football Academy in 2015 after passing the trials. After a year there, he left to seek better growth opportunities and joined Bengaluru FC's reserve side Bengaluru B in 2017, where he stayed till graduation and also featured for the Bengaluru U18 team. At youth level, he played in the Subroto Cup in 2015 and the B.C. Roy Trophy, and later represented Mizoram in the 2021 Santosh Trophy Qualifiers.

=== Aizawl ===
Before joining Aizawl in 2022, Mafela had played for other football clubs such as Peniel Sporting Club (Hnahthial), Ramhlun North FC, Ramakrishna Club and Swaraj FC.

==== 2022–23 ====
In July 2022, he signed a two-year professional contract with The People's Club and wore the number 10 Jersey for Aizawl. He made his professional debut for Aizawl against TRAU on 15 November, at the Rajiv Gandhi Stadium in Aizawl. He played for 90 minutes in the first match of the 2022–23 I-League season and scored his debut professional goal at 48th minute and won the Hero of the Match Award. Besides having scored one goal, Mafela registered two assists to his name in the 2022 I League, one against Sreenidi Deccan FC and another one against Mumbai Kenkre FC.

He sustained an injury to his foot in a match against Mohammedan SC (Kolkata) on 13 January 2023 and therefore missed the next two away matches - one against Sudeva Delhi FC on 16 January 2023 and another one against NEROCA FC on 21 January 2023.

Even though not being fully recovered from the injury, he appeared in the home match against Mohammedan SC (Kolkata) on 26 January 2023 where Aizawl FC won by one goal.

==== 2023–24 ====
In the 2023-24 I-league season, he played 90 plus minutes in the first match of Aizawl FC for the season against Mohammedan SC (Kolkata) at Naihati Bankimanjali Stadium on 29 October 2023 and scored the lone goal for Aizawl. In the second match of the season on 7 November 2023 against Sreenidi Deccan FC at Deccan Arena, he registered an assist for his meticulous pass which was converted to alter the match's trajectory. He made another assist in the 46th minute of the match against Delhi FC on 17 November 2023 at Rajiv Gandhi Stadium. He registered one more goal to his name in their home match against Namdhari FC on 21 November 2023. In a crucial I-League encounter against Gokulam Kerala FC on Saturday, 16 December 2023, he executed a deceptive body feint to outmaneuver a Gokulam Kerala defender and sent a well-directed low cross into the box and registered an assist to his name one more time.

During the season of 2023–24, Aizawl FC played a total of 22 matches against other I-League clubs due to the cancellation by AIFF of their two home games against TRAU and NEROCA because of the state of affairs in Manipur. Mafela missed only one match of the season due to injuries and was in the squad for 21 matches and appeared in those 21 of 22 matches and set a record for the season as the player who made the greatest number of appearances. He also registered a record for making the greatest number of assists for Aizawl during the season with 4 assists.

=== Mohammedan SC (Kolkata) ===
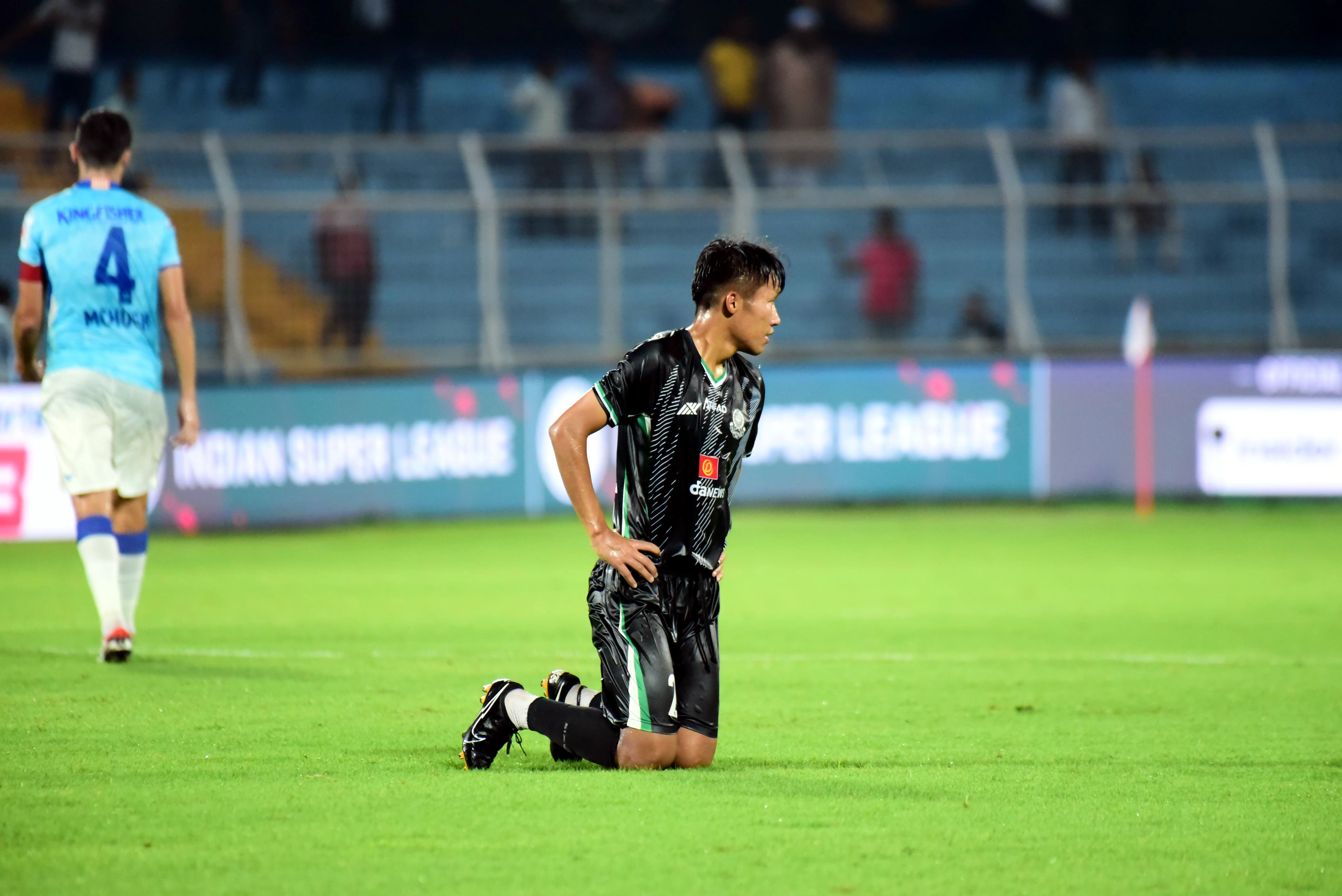
Lalrinfela at the end of his debut ISL match at Kishore Bharati Krirangan Stadium in Kolkata on 21 September 2024

==== 2024–25 ====
On 1 June 2024, Mafela signed for Mohammedan SC on a three-year contract which came into force with effect from 1 July 2024 and shall remain in force for a period until 31 August 2027. He wears Jersey number 21 for Mohammedan SC. He made his professional debut for Mohammedan SC in an Indian Super League (ISL) match against FC Goa at the Kishore Bharati Krirangan Stadium in Kolkata on 22 September 2024, which ended in a 1–1 draw even though Mohammedan SC dominated the game for 94 minutes. He came on as a substitute for Amarjit Singh Kiyam in the 69th-minute of the game and registered a passing accuracy percentage of 90.

=== Termination of the contract ===
A three-year contract signed between Mohammedan SC and the player on 1 June 2024 which covered from 1 July 2024 to 31 August 2027 was terminated with mutual consent with immediate effect on 11 March 2025 at the initiative of the player with a just cause.

=== Odisha FC ===
K.Lalrinfela (Lalrinfela Khiangte, Mafela), Odisha FC player

He has signed a three-year contract, with an option to extend by an additional year, to be effective from 1 June 2025 with Odisha FC.

==== 2025–26 ====
He made his Odisha FC debut on 6 March 2026 against Mohun Bagan SG, coming on as a 72nd-minute substitute and recording two key passes and one shot in 18 minutes. He subsequently became a regular starter, featuring in the first eleven for the rest of the club's matches. In the 2025–26 season, he played 11 of 13 games, recording 3 assists and 1 goal. He finished joint-top for assists for Odisha FC in 2025–26 season, along with Lalthathanga Khawlhring. His standout performance came against SC Delhi on 8 May 2026, earning him the Player of the Match award.

His three assists came against NorthEast United, Mohammedan and Bengaluru. He made 16 key passes, created two big chances and had seven shots during this short season.

==== 2026–27 ====
He has made three appearances in the four matches Odisha have played so far against Punjab, Inter Kashi, NorthEast United and Mohun Bagan registering seven key passes and five shots.

== Career statistics ==
As of 5 November 2026

Club	Season	League				Super Cup			AFC		Total		
Club	Season	Division	Apps	Goals	Assists	Apps	Goals	Assists	Apps	Goals	Apps	Goals	Assists
Bengaluru B	2018–19	I-League 2nd Division	1	0	0	-	-	-	-	-	1	0	0
Aizawl	2022–23	I-League	20	1	2	3 (Note: Appearance(s) in 2023 Indian Super Cup)	-	1	-	-	23	1	3
Aizawl	2023–24	I-League	21	2	4	0	—	—	—	—	21	2	4
Aizawl	Aizawl total		41	3	6	3	0	1	0	0	44	3	7
Mohammedan	2024–25	Indian Super League	11	—	—	—	—	—	—	—	11	—	—
Mohammedan	Mohammedan SC total		11	—	—	—	—	—	—	—	11	—	—
Odisha FC	2025–26	Indian Super League	11	1	3	—	—	—	—	—	11	1	3
Odisha FC	2026–27	Indian Super League	4	0	0	—	—	—	—	—	4	0	0
Odisha FC	Odisha FC total		15	1	3	—	—	—	—	—	15	1	3
Career total			68	4	9	3	0	1	0	0	71	4	10
