= Adama Niane (footballer) =

Malian footballer (born 1993)

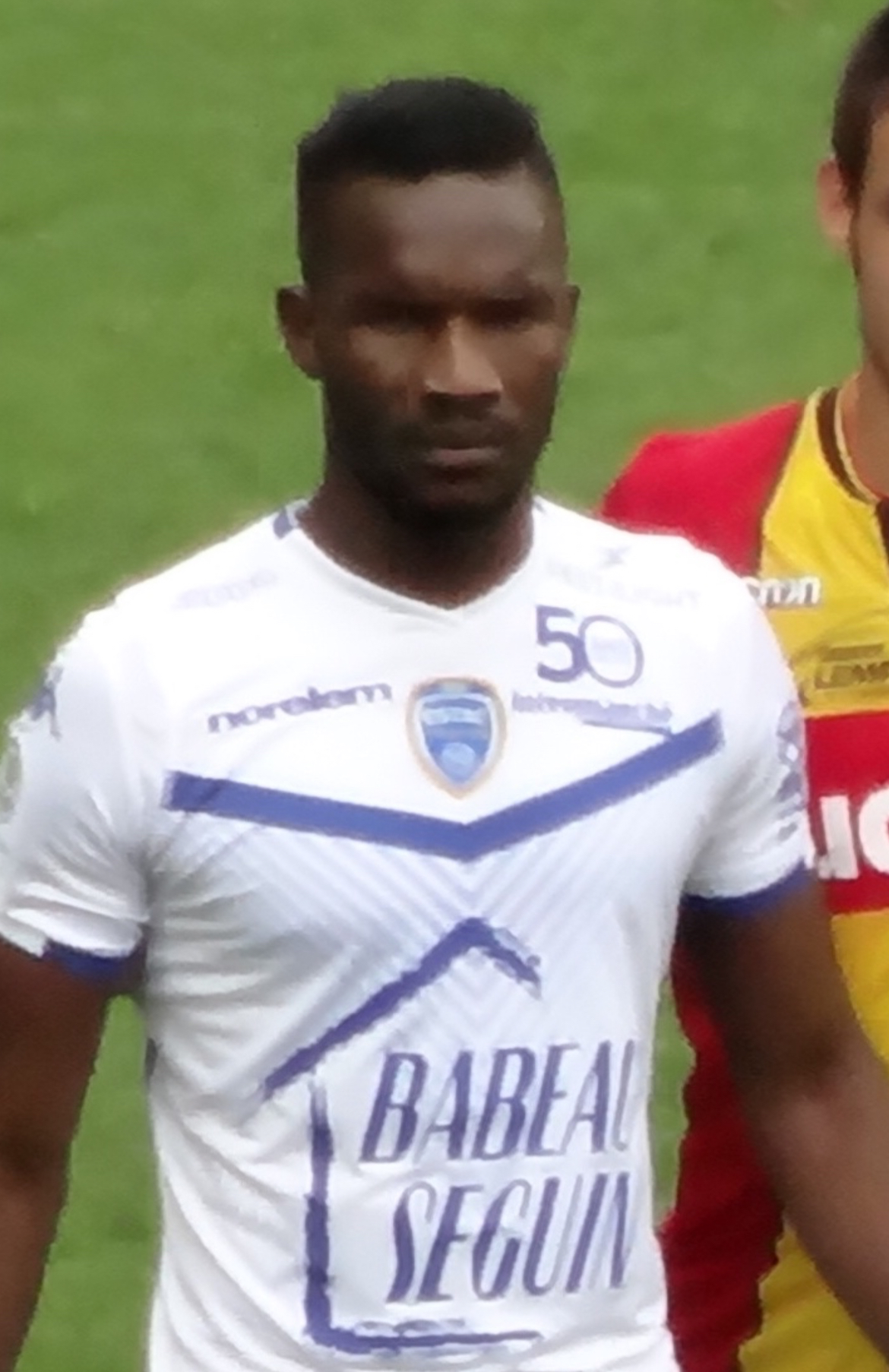
- Niane with Troyes in 2018.

Personal information
- Full name: Adama Niane
- Date of birth: 16 June 1993 (age 33)
- Place of birth: Bamako, Mali
- Height: 1.83 m (6 ft 0 in)
- Position: Forward

Youth career
- 2003–2011: Yeelen Olympique
- 2011–2012: Nantes

Senior career*
Years	Team	Apps	(Gls)
2012–2016	Nantes B	91	(40)
2012–2015	Nantes	4	(0)
2016–2018	Troyes	69	(31)
2018–2020	Charleroi	25	(2)
2020	→ KV Oostende (loan)	5	(0)
2020–2022	Sochaux	33	(4)
2021–2022	Sochaux B	3	(1)
2022	→ Dunkerque (loan)	14	(3)
2022–2023	Nassaji	23	(0)
2023–2024	Kapaz	12	(3)
2024–2025	Gokulam Kerala	19	(6)

International career^{‡}
2011–2013	Mali U20	17	(10)
2017–	Mali	7	(0)
- * Club domestic league appearances and goals as of 6 April 2025 ‡ National team caps and goals as of 09:47, 15 July 2019 (UTC)

Adama Niane (born 16 June 1993) is a Malian professional footballer who plays as a forward .

== Club career ==
=== Early career ===
Born in Bamako, Niane started his career at Yeelen Olympique, joining the club as a youth player in 2003.

=== Nantes ===
Niane joined French club Nantes in 2011. He played for the club's U19 team in the 2011–12 season, during which they finished as runners-up in the Championnat National U19 and he finished as the competition's top scorer. On 1 July 2012, Niane joined the club's reserve team. He made his first team debut for Nantes on 15 December 2012 in a Ligue 2 home match against Caen, coming on as a substitute for Jordan Veretout in the 92nd minute; Nantes won the match 2–1.

Niane played a total of 91 matches (he started in 81 of them) and scored 40 goals in the Championnnat de France Amateur and the Championnnat de France Amateur 2 for the reserved team of Nantes from 2012 to 2016. He only played 6 competitive matches and did not score any goals (3 Ligue 1, 1 Ligue 2 and 2 Coupe de France matches) for its first team during that period.

=== Troyes ===
Niane joined Ligue 2 club Troyes on 22 August 2016 on a free transfer, signing a two-year contract that would expire in June 2018. In January 2017, he extended his contract until June 2019. Niane was the top scorer in the 2016–17 Ligue 2, scoring 23 goals in 33 Ligue 2 matches.

On 11 August 2017, Niane scored the first Ligue 1 goal of his career in an away match against Nice with a lob over Yoan Cardinale in the 54th minute; in the 85th minute, he assisted Saîf-Eddine Khaoui to ensure that Troyes won the match 2–1.

=== Charleroi ===
On 29 August 2018, Niane joined Belgian First Division A side Charleroi. He made his competitive debut for the club on 1 September 2018 in a 3–1 victory in the league over Mouscron. It was in this same match that Niane scored his first goal for Charleroi, which came in the 38th minute and was assisted by Jérémy Perbet.

Niane was only used in four league games for Charleroi in the 2019-20 season and was therefore loaned out to fellow league club KV Oostende on 28 January 2020 for the rest of the season. He returned to Charleroi in the summer 2020 after five games for Oostende.

=== Sochaux ===
On 24 September 2020, Niane moved to French Ligue 2 club Sochaux, signing a deal until June 2022.

On 12 January 2022, Niane joined Dunkerque on a six-month loan.

=== Gokulam Kerala ===
On 18 November 2024, Niane signed with I-League club Gokulam Karala.

== International career ==
Niane was named in Mali's squad for the 2013 African Youth Championship. He scored the only goal in Mali's opening game versus Nigeria.

Niane also played at the 2013 FIFA U-20 World Cup in Turkey.

Niane made his debut for the senior Mali national team in a 2–1 2019 Africa Cup of Nations qualification win over Gabon on 10 June 2017.

== Career statistics ==
As of match played 15 July 2019

Appearances and goals by club, season and competition
Club	Season	League			National cup		League cup		Other		Total	
Club	Season	Division	Apps	Goals	Apps	Goals	Apps	Goals	Apps	Goals	Apps	Goals
Nantes	2012–13	Ligue 2	1	0	2	0	0	0	—		3	0
Nantes	2014–15	Ligue 1	3	0	0	0	0	0	—		3	0
Nantes	Total		4	0	2	0	0	0	—		6	0
Nantes B	2012–13	CFA 2	20	10	—		—		—		20	10
Nantes B	2013–14	CFA	26	5	—		—		—		26	5
Nantes B	2014–15	CFA	23	13	—		—		—		23	13
Nantes B	2015–16	CFA	22	12	—		—		—		22	12
Nantes B	Total		91	40	—		—		—		91	40
Troyes	2016–17	Ligue 2	33	23	1	0	0	0	2 (Note: Appearances in the 2017 Ligue 1 Play-offs)	0	36	23
Troyes	2017–18	Ligue 1	33	8	1	0	1	0	—		35	8
Troyes	2018–19	Ligue 2	3	0	0	0	1	0	—		4	0
Troyes	Total		69	31	2	0	2	0	2	0	75	31
Charleroi	2018–19	Belgian First Division A	21	2	1	0	—		10	5	30	7
Career total			185	73	5	0	2	0	12	5	204	78

=== International ===
As of matches played on 15 July 2019

Appearances and goals by national team and year
National team	Year	Apps	Goals
Mali	2017	4	0
Mali	2018	0	0
Mali	2019	3	0
Total		7	0
