= R. Ramdinthara =

Indian footballer (born 2002)

Tharpuia
Personal information
- Date of birth: 23 August 2004 (age 22)
- Place of birth: Champhai, Mizoram, India
- Height: 1.68 m (5 ft 6 in)
- Position: Winger

Team information
- Current team: Chanmari
- Number: 67

Youth career
- –2019: NorthEast United U18

Senior career*
Years	Team	Apps	(Gls)
2019	Electric Veng		
2019–2022	Champhai Kanan VC		
2022–2024	Aizawl	42	(7)
2024–2025	Gokulam Kerala	9	(1)
2025–2026	Diamond Harbour	11	(3)
2026–	Chanmari	0	(0)
- * Club domestic league appearances and goals as of 22:55, 23 May 2026 (UTC)

R. Ramdinthara (born 23 August 2002), commonly known by his nickname Tharpuia, is an Indian professional footballer who plays as a forward for Indian Football League club Chanmari.

== Career ==
=== Champhai Kanan ===
On 19 July 2022, Tharpuia scored the two winning goals for Champhai Kanan VC in the final of the 2022 All Mizoram Inter Village Tournament, against Sialhawk VC. He was awarded the 'Top Scorer' title, a trophy and a cash prize of ₹5,000 for scoring 13 goals in the tournament.

=== Aizawl ===
Eight days later, Tharpuia was snapped up by I-League club Aizawl. On 15 November, he assisted on his debut in the I-League against TRAU, in a 1–1 stalemate.

== Career statistics ==
=== Club ===
As of 28 July 2025

Club	Season	League			Cup		AFC		Total	
Club	Season	Division	Apps	Goals	Apps	Goals	Apps	Goals	Apps	Goals
Aizawl	2022–23	I-League	22	4	0	0	–		22	4
Aizawl	2023–24	I-League	20	3	0	0	–		20	3
Aizawl	Total		42	7	0	0	0	0	42	7
Gokulam Kerala	2024–25	I-League	9	1	0	0	–		9	1
Diamond Harbour	2025–26	I-League	0	0	1 (Note: Appearance(s) in Durand Cup)	0	–		1	0
Career total			51	8	1	0	0	0	52	8
