= Alexis Gómez (footballer) =

Argentine footballer

Personal information
- Full name: Alexis Nahuel Gómez
- Date of birth: 28 February 2000 (age 26)
- Place of birth: San Martín, Buenos Aires, Argentina
- Height: 1.70 m (5 ft 7 in)
- Position: Attacking midfielder

Youth career
- –2017: Estudiantes

Senior career*
| Years | Team | Apps | (Gls) |
| 2017–2021 | Estudiantes | 9 | (0) |
| 2021–2022 | Deportivo Riestra | 14 | (0) |
| 2022–2023 | UAI Urquiza | 16 | (2) |
| 2023 | Sudeva Delhi | 11 | (8) |
| 2023–2025 | Mohammedan | 37 | (4) |
| 2025–2026 | Persijap Jepara | 23 | (1) |
- * Club domestic league appearances and goals

Alexis Nahuel Gómez (born 28 February 2000) is an Argentine professional footballer who plays as an attacking midfielder.

== Club career ==
Gómez signed his first professional contract with Estudiantes in late 2016. After making his debut in a 2–2 draw against Excursionistas, his performances garnered interest from top Argentinian sides River Plate, Boca Juniors and Independiente.

In 2023, Gómez moved to India and signed with Sudeva Delhi. He scored multiple goals for the club while they got relegated after end of the season.

=== Mohammedan SC ===
Gómez joined i-league side Mohammedan in 2023, which were promoted to Indian Super League, for the 2024–25 season.

He scored his own as well as the club's debut goal of ISL from penalty spot in their second match against FC Goa on 21 September 2024.

== Career statistics ==
=== Club ===
As of 29 May 2020

| Club | Season | League | | | Cup | | Other | | Total | |
| Club | Season | Division | Apps | Goals | Apps | Goals | Apps | Goals | Apps | Goals |
|---|---|---|---|---|---|---|---|---|---|---|
| Estudiantes | 2016–17 | Primera B Metropolitana | 9 | 0 | 1 (Note: Appearances in the Copa Argentina) | 0 | 0 | 0 | 10 | 0 |
| Estudiantes | 2017–18 | Primera B Metropolitana | 0 | 0 | 0 | 0 | 0 | 0 | 0 | 0 |
| Estudiantes | 2018–19 | Primera B Metropolitana | 0 | 0 | 0 | 0 | 0 | 0 | 0 | 0 |
| Estudiantes | 2019–20 | Primera B Nacional | 0 | 0 | 0 | 0 | 0 | 0 | 0 | 0 |
| Estudiantes | 2020 | Primera Nacional | 0 | 0 | 0 | 0 | 0 | 0 | 0 | 0 |
| Estudiantes | Total | | 9 | 0 | 1 | 0 | 0 | 0 | 10 | 0 |
| Deportivo Riestra | 2021 | Primera Nacional | 1 | 0 | 0 | 0 | 0 | 0 | 1 | 0 |
| Career total | | | 10 | 0 | 1 | 0 | 0 | 0 | 11 | 0 |

== Honours ==
Mohammedan

- I-League: 2023–24
