= 2017–18 Aizawl FC season =

Indian football club season

Aizawl
2017–18 season
- Chairman: Robert Romawia Royte
- Manager: Paulo Menezes (until 12 February); Santosh Kashyap (from 13 February)
- Stadium: Rajiv Gandhi Stadium
- I-League: 5th
- Mizoram Premier League: Runners-up
- AFC Champions League: Play-off round
- AFC Cup: Group stage
- Super Cup: Quarter finals
- Top goalscorer: League: Yugo Kobayashi (4 goals); Léonce Dodoz Zikahi (4 goals); All: Andrei Ionescu (12 goals)
- Highest home attendance: 7,280 vs East Bengal (16 January 2018)
- Lowest home attendance: 2,800 vs Gokulam Kerala (2 March 2018)
- Average home league attendance: 4,255
Home colours	Away colours

Aizawl Football Club held its thirty-fourth season from 1 June 2017 to 31 May 2018, entering the 2017–18 I-League season as the defending champions finishing fifth. They reached the final of the Mizoram Premier League, losing to Chhinga Veng FC. The club started in the 2018 AFC Champions League but lost to Zob Ahan in the playoff round. This meant that they qualified for the 2018 AFC Cup where they finished bottom of the group. In the Super Cup, they were eliminated in the quarter-finals by East Bengal.

== Season overview ==
=== Pre-season ===
After winning the previous season, Khalid Jamil joined East Bengal. He was joined by fellow team members Mahmoud Amnah, Lalramchullova and Brandon Vanlalremdika. The loans of Albino Gomes, Ashutosh Mehta and Jayesh Rane ended without extensions, so these players returned to their respective clubs before the start of the 2017–18 season. Fellow Mizo outfit Chinnga Veng F.C. signed Aizawl's goal-keeper, Zothanmawia ahead of this season's Mizoram Premier League.

In June 2017, Aizawl signed a former defender and ONGC captain, Lalchhuanawma Varte as their first signing of the season. Later in June, Mohun Bagan announced the signing of Aizawl's defender Kingsley Obumneme; Mohun Bagan announced the signing of Aizawl's defender, Kamo Stephane Bayi.

A new coach, Paulo Menezes, was signed on 28 July.

=== July ===
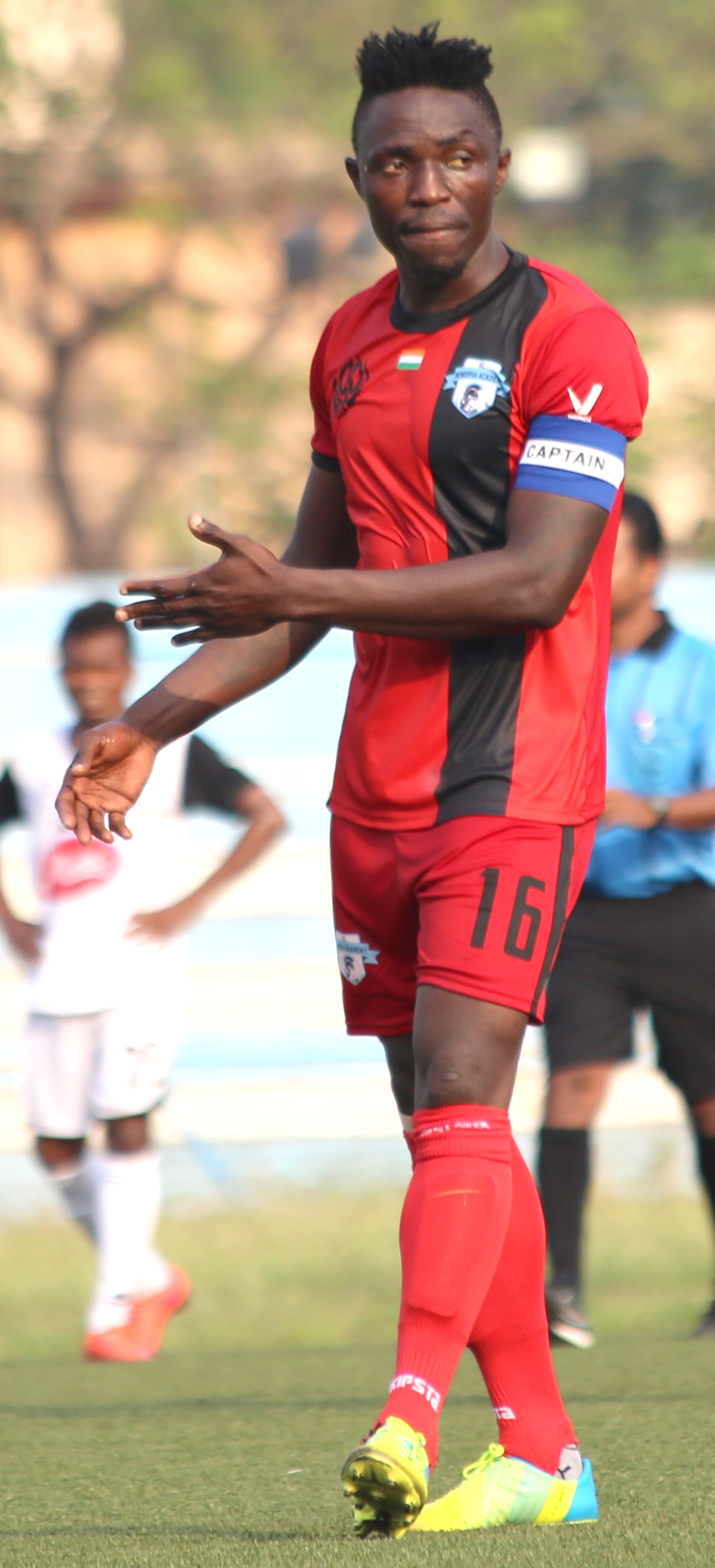
Kareem Omolaja signed by Aizawl FC from Minerva Punjab F.C.

In July, Aizawl signed former midfielder, David Lalrinmuana, from East Bengal. He had played for Aizawl in the 2012 I-League 2nd Division. Aizawl also signed Nigerian defender Kareem Omolaja from Minerva Punjab, former Indian defender Shylo Malsawmtluanga from Bhawanipore F.C.

East Bengal signed Aizawl's winger, Laldanmawia Ralte for the 2017–18 season on 9 July.

On 23 July, in the ISL Draft, Kerala Blasters picked Lalthakima and Lalruatthara and Bengaluru picked Zohmingliana Ralte.

=== August ===
Aizawl announced the signing of former defender and local native Lalrozama Fanai from Fateh Hyderabad F.C. on 9 August.

On 18 August, Aizawl signed Japanese forward, Yugo Kobayashi from Songkhla United F.C. and a custodian, Avilash Paul from Pune F.C.

Aizawl also signed Ivorian striker Léonce Dodoz Zikahi on 20 August. He had played for Mohammedan Sporting in I-League 2nd Division in the 2016–2017 season. On 24 August, Aizawl signed Afghan defender, Masih Saighani, from the German club Türk Gücü Friedberg. The team signed Romanian striker Andrei Ionescu from FC Voluntari on 26 August. On 28 August, Aizawl announced their squad for the Mizoram Premier League.

On 31 August, Aizawl started their 2017–18 season with an away match against Ramhlun North in the 2017–18 Mizoram Premier League. Aizawl gave away an early lead to the home team, with Lalliansanga scoring for Ramhlun North in the 12th minute. They tied the score in the 35th minute with a strike from Jonathan Lalrawngbawla (Jojo). Neither team scored a goal in the second half resulting in a tie score for the match.

=== September ===
On 1 September, Aizawl signed Liandala Fanai from Chennai City F.C.

Aizawl drew their second match on 8 September against Chanmari with a goal scored by both teams. Lalmuanawma scored for Chanmari in the 26th minute and David Lalrinmuana scored in the injury time of first half.

On 15 September, Aizawl played their first home match against Chhinga Veng that ended in a draw. Lalthathanga Khawlhring scored for Aizawl in the 19th minute but Malsawmfela scored for Chhinga Veng three minutes later. Khawlhring scored an own-goal in the 36th minute, giving the advantage to Chhinga Veng by half-time. Jojo scored for Aizawl in the 47th minute. Aizawl lost their first match in the tournament to Chanmari West 0–1 in an away match on 18 September. Lalremruata scored the only goal of the match for Chanmari West in the 74th minute. This loss placed Aizawl in seventh position with just three points in four matches.

Aizawl secured their first win of the tournament by defeating the Mizoram Police FC by 6–1 on 21 September. Rochharzela scored the first hat-trick for Aizawl in the tournament with Hmingthanmawia, Alfred Jaryan and Jojo each scoring a goal. Kareem Omolaja scored the lone goal for the Mizoram Police. On 28 September, Aizawl secured their second consecutive win in the tournament defeating Dinthar. Omolaja and Jojo each scored for Aizawl in the first half within two minutes of each other. Lalmuankima scored the third goal for Aizawl. The two wins placed Aizawl in third position at the end of September.

=== October ===
On 3 October, Aizawl played Bethlehem who scored first with a goal by Dawngzela in the 36th minute, and again just before half-time with a goal by Samson Ramengmawia. They maintained their lead in the second-half winning the match by 2–0.

After a defeat in their first tournament meeting, Mizoram Police came back strongly on 13 October to tie the match 2–2 with Aizawl. With the loss and draw Aizawl dropped to fourth position with six games remaining in this League Stage. Aizawl beat Chanmari by 3–1 on 19 October. Malsawmzuala scored the first goal for Chanmari in the 20th minute. Aizawl responded with William Lalnunfela and Ionescu each scoring in the space of four minutes. Lalnunfela scored his second match goal in the second half.

On 24 October, Aizawl defeated Bethlehem with a 5–1 win. Lalmuankima scored first for Aizawl in the 17th minute, but Lalnuntluanga equalized for Bethlehem three minutes later. Lalrinmuana scored a second Aizawl goal in the 25th minute and doubled their lead in the first half with a goal from their international defender, Saighani. In the second half Aizawl scored two goals, one each from Lalrinmuana and Rochharzela. Aizawl defeated the in-form Chhinga Veng with a 2–0 win on 26 October. Lalmuankima scored the first goal of the match for Aizawl in the 16th minute. Chhinga Veng was never able to break the Aizawl defense. Aizawl doubled their lead in the final minutes with a goal from Jojo.

=== November ===
On 1 November, Aizawl completed their first double of the tournament over Dinthar with a 4–0 victory. Lalrinmuana scored for Aizawl in the ninth minute. Later, Lalmuankima and Ionescu scored a goal each. Aizawl ended the first half with a three-goal lead. Lalnunfela scored in the second half for Aizawl, securing their place in the semifinals.

On 6 November, the AFC License was awarded to Aizawl FC, allowing the team to play in AFC Club competitions for the 2017–18 season. With the rise in club-rankings as current I-League champions, Aizawl FC became first Indian club to play in AFC Play-off round. Aizawl signed former East Bengal F.C. and NEROCA F.C. custodian Arup Debnath as a backup to their first choice player between the sticks on 7 November.

On 10 November, Aizawl won 2–0 over Chanmari West scoring a goal in both halves. Saighani scored first for Aizawl in the 25th minute. Later, Lalnunfela scored the late goal in the 88th minute, securing the team's position in the top two in League Stage. Aizawl lost their last game in the League Stage of the tournament against Ramhlun North on 17 November. Lalremruata scored for Ramhlun North in the final minutes to keep their hopes of advancing to semifinals alive.

On 23 November in the MPL Semifinal first leg, Lalrinpuia of the Mizoram Police scored the first goal in the seventh minute. Aizawl responded when Afghan defender Saighani scored for Aizawl in the 22nd minute. Later, Lalhriatrenga put the I-League champion club ahead in the 85th minute. A last-minute goal scored by Police striker Joseph Lalfakzuala tied the score. Aizawl announced the arrival of V Laltanpuia and Lalthathanga Khawlhring on loan from Mizoram Police FC and NorthEast United FC respectively for 2017–18 season.

Aizawl started the I-League with a 2–2 draw against East Bengal on 28 November in an away encounter. The Kolkata Giants scored first when Katsumi Yusa's corner was deflected by Brandon and Eduardo Ferreira headed in at the far post. Later, Katsumi doubled East Bengal's lead when Avilash was left wrong-footed from the initial shot taken by Mohammed Rafique which took a deflection off Katsumi and beat the goalkeeper. Aizawl scored within two minutes when David curled a free kick inside the box which was headed in by Lalnunfela. Aizawl tied in the final minutes of the match when William scored his second from a Khawlhring corner.

I-League Position at the end of November

Pos	Team	Pld	W	D	L	GF	GA	GD	Pts
4	Aizawl	1	0	1	0	2	2	0	1

=== December ===
On 4 December in the MPL Semifinal second leg, Aizawl took the lead in the 14th minute with a strike from Lalmuankima. Mizoram Police FC tied three minutes later when Lalbiakhlua scored from a Valpuia delivery. In a penalty shootout, Aizawl scored to give the two-time MPL champions a 5–3 shootout victory. On 8 December in the MPL Final, Chhinga Veng's Laldampuia scored in the fifth minute. Aizawl skipper Lalrinmuana almost struck an equalizer with a free-kick at the other end while Saighani also came close. The I-League champions did improve in the second half but missed a great chance to equalize late on as Saighani was gifted a great opportunity only for him to drill his effort right in front of Chhinga Veng FC's custodian Zothanmawia. This made Aizawl settle as runners-up. Rochharzela was awarded the Best Young Player and H. Lalmuankima was awarded Best Forward of the Tournament for Mizoram Premier League.

On 13 December, Aizawl clinched their first victory of the season scoring a late winner against Churchill Brothers at Aizawl. They missed the services of their top-scorer Lalnunfela for the match due to an ankle injury. The hosts were in complete control of the game and enjoyed the lion's share of possession right from the start but lack of finishing haunted them. They also had to replace Lalrinmuana early in the match because of a hamstring niggle. It was only in the 88th minute that Aizawl could finally register a winning goal when Dodoz assisted Kobayashi, whose left-footed shot sailed past Churchill Brothers' custodian.

On 18 December, Aizawl's 616-day unbeaten run at home in the I-League ended after losing their first home match since April 2016 to Shillong Lajong. After an array of chances, the score stood at 0–0 at the end of the first half. But Reds outclassed the home side in the second half. Aiman Al-Hagri's shot inside the box was blocked by the Aizawl's boys, but the ball fell to Lajong's winger Tlang who calmly curled the ball towards the far side of the net and scored the winning goal of the match.

On 27 December, Aizawl ended Minerva Punjab's unbeaten run with a 2–1 crucial victory in Aizawl. The ball from Lalrinmuana's corner was guided to the far post of Minerva's goal by defender Omolaja to leave goalkeeper Rakshit Dagar completely stranded. Dodoz danced past Minerva's defender and slid the ball to Romanian midfielder Ionescu, who made no mistake as he slotted home his first goal of the season. Minerva pulled one back in the added time as Girik Khosla made the best out of the defensive lapses.

On 31 December, Aizawl beat debutants Gokulam Kerala 0–2 in an away encounter. A low cross from left-flank by Hmunmawia took a deflection off Gokulam's Daniel Ashley Addo to Kobayashi, whose shot put the ball into the net in the 45th minute. After the changeover, Aizawl took only seven minutes to double the lead courtesy of Ionescu's efforts.

I-League Position at the end of December

Pos	Team	Pld	W	D	L	GF	GA	GD	Pts
5	Aizawl	5	3	1	1	7	4	+3	10

=== January ===
On 1 January, Aizawl announced the signing of Mizo forward, Lalkhawpuimawia from Chhinga Veng.

The Indian Super League side FC Goa signed Lalmuankima in a free transfer on 6 January. On 7 January, Aizawl went down 2–0 to Mohun Bagan in an away encounter, the first match in 2018. The first goal came dramatically when Saighani outstretched his leg to deny Aser Pierrick Dipanda a finish on the cross but ended up tapping the ball into his own goal. Dicka doubled the lead for the Mariners, making the best use of a long ball as he dribbled past an advancing Avilash on the left before slotting it home with his left foot.

On 13 January, Aizawl returned to their winning ways by outclassing Chennai City 2–0 in a home encounter. Kobayashi opened the scoring when he converted a penalty after Chennai City's Venyamin Shumeyko handled the ball while trying to stop Lalrinmuana inside the box. In the 33rd minute, Lalrinmuana latched on to a square pass from Ionescu and fired a left-footer which took a slight deflection off Dharmaraj Ravanan before rolling home to double the lead to Aizawl. Aizawl played out a goalless draw against East Bengal in a home encounter on 16 January. Aizawl missed chances in the first half as Jaryan's shot flew just wide of the post and Lalnunfela failed to connect Albert Zohmingmawia's pass from six yards. In the second half, Vanlalremdika's curled effort from outside of the box was palmed away by Aizawl's custodian Avilash. Aizawl substitute Lalkhawpuimawia could not get his head to Laldinliana Renthlei's cross in the final ten minutes to seal the match.

On 20 January, Aizawl lost their way as away side NEROCA came from behind in the second half to win the game 1–2. Nigerian defender Omolaja leaped above NEROCA's defenders to score for the home side with a cross from Ionescu after Zohmingmawia's corner was cleared from initial danger by Varney Kallon. Felix Chidi Odili scored the equalizer in the 65th minute after a team game broke the Aizawl defense. Turkovic stunned Aizawl in the dying embers of the game when he perfectly converted Biakzara's cross from the left wing. On 25 January, Aizawl dropped points to Mohun Bagan in a home tie as the match was drawn at 1–1 with Aizawl dominating the match from start to finish. Aizawl's forward Kobayashi was booked for a challenge on Obumneme in the first minute. Jaryan chased down every ball in the middle and Dodoz tormented Bagan's backline. All the significant action on the field took place in the final 20 minutes as Khawlhring had put the home side ahead in the 73rd minute before Bagan's substitute Manandeep Singh restored parity from the penalty spot just five minutes later. In the dying minutes of the match, while Aizawl was searching for a winner, Jaryan was shown a straight red by the referee for a stomp on defender Rana Gharami as the match ended in a stalemate.

On 30 January, Aizawl failed to qualify for the AFC Champions League after losing 3–1 to Iran's Zob Ahan in an away encounter in the play-off round from West Region. Zob Ahan struck in the third minute through a spot-kick by Mehdi Rajabzadeh when Lalrosanga fouled Morteza Tabrizi inside the penalty box. Aizawl gradually started to make inroads when Ionescu connected a cross delivered by Laldinliana from the center of the box to beat Zob Ahan's custodian Mohammad Rashid Mazaheri. In the 83rd minute, Tabrizi's header put Zob Ahan ahead. Meneses' men were put under more misery when Tabrizi scored for the second time heading in from close range to the bottom left corner after latching onto a cross from Mohammad Reza Hosseini. With this loss, Aizawl was knocked out of the AFC Champions League but gained direct entry into Group E of the AFC Cup.

I-League Position at the end of January

Pos	Team	Pld	W	D	L	GF	GA	GD	Pts
6	Aizawl	10	4	3	3	11	9	+2	15

=== February ===
On 3 February, Aizawl drew with Chennai City 1–1 in an away encounter. Ionescu got past his marker on the right before getting into the box and playing a cross to Kobayashi, who tucked a neat finish into the net giving Aizawl the lead in the third minute. They lost many chances to extend their lead as both Ionescu and Lalrinmuana hit the post. However, Chennai City restored parity in the 73rd minute when Beauty curled the ball into the top right corner. 10-man Aizawl lost 0–1 to Churchill Brothers in an away encounter on 6 February as they scored a single goal through Mechac Koffi in the 22nd minute. Nicholas Fernandes, on receiving a long ball, deceived defender Laldinliana and crossed the ball for Koffi to send into the net. Aizawl came back strongly in the last quarter, but their search for an equalizer ended when they were reduced to 10 men in the last ten minutes as Lalrosanga was shown a red card for a deliberate foul on Dawda Ceesay who was about to score.

Aizawl held NEROCA to a goalless draw on 10 February in a closely contested and tactical away match where both sides failed to score even though there were many clear chances. NEROCA had two clear chances, one at the stroke of half time, which Turković muffed, and another deep into the match that was wasted by Chidi. Aizawl striker Zikahi had a chance to hand his side a full three points in the second minute of the stoppage time, but he shot wide. On 12 February, Aizawl announced that they parted ways with their head coach, Paulo Menezes, after seven consecutive winless streak in their on-going I-League campaign. They announced Santosh Kashyap as their incoming coach. Aizawl welcomed back Lalchhawnkima who joined on loan from Mumbai City FC on 15 February.

On 16 February, Aizawl drew 2–2 against a resilient Indian Arrows in an away match. Ionescu delivered the ball to Saighani who slotted it past a Prabhsukhan Singh Gill in the 40th minute. Indian Arrows was quick to find the equalizer on the 48th minute as Ashish Rai found Edmund Lalrindika with a delivery. He foxed his marker to trigger a shot at the bottom right corner which beat a diving Avilash. Aizawl continued to pile on the pressure and in the 54th minute Dodoz pierced the net after latching on to a pass from inside the box by Zohmingmawia. The Blue Colts finally equalized the game in the dying minutes when skipper Amarjit Singh Kiyam converted a penalty after Lalrosanga brought down Rahul Praveen inside the box. Ahead of match against Shillong Lajong, on 18 February, Aizawl coach Santosh Kashyap announced their foreign recruits, Kobayashi and Omolaja, had been ruled out for the rest of the season due to injuries.

On 19 February, Aizawl lost 2–1 to Shillong Lajong at Shillong in an away North-East derby. In the 42nd minute, Shillong took the lead when Tlang connected with Novin Gurung's cross from the left. Shillong doubled the lead in the 73rd minute when Saihou Jagne got the better of Jaryan and made his way into the box before poking the ball into the net. In the dying moments of the match, Nidhin Lal failed to collect Ionescu's shot which allowed Léonce Dodoz Zikahi to shoot the ball into the net from the loose clearance.

Aizawl finally ended an eight-match winless streak with a 3–0 win over Indian Arrows. Aizawl needed only seven minutes to score the first goal of the match when Lalkhawpuimawia skipped past Sanjeev Stalin and shot towards goal. Arrows' custodian Prabhsukhan failed to grab as it found its way to Ionescu who easily found the back of the net three yards out. In the 16th minute, Lalkhawpuimawia slipped from the guard of the Arrows defenders, his first shot hit both the woodwork, but he scored on the rebound to double the lead. To confirm three points for Aizawl, Lalkhawpuimawia scored his second in the 87th minute when he tucked the ball in the back of the net after Dodoz provided him with a pass from the back.

On 26 February, Aizawl lost 2–0 to table-toppers Minerva Punjab in an away game where Minerva enjoyed the lion's share of possession with Aizawl's attack coming from Ionescu. Akash broke the deadlock for Minerva in the 50th minute on the rebound after Chencho Gyeltshen's shot after receiving a pass from William Opoku that was stopped by Avilash. Minerva sealed the game with a strike late into the second half injury time when Opoku's header off a Kamalpreet Singh free-kick landed on Armand's path.

I-League Position at the end of February

Pos	Team	Pld	W	D	L	GF	GA	GD	Pts
6	Aizawl	17	5	6	6	18	17	+1	21

=== March ===
The month of March saw Aizawl play their final match of the I-League campaign against Gokulam Kerala. After conceding a 25th-minute penalty which was scored by Al-Ajmi in the first half, Léonce Dodoz Zikahi scored the reply on the hour stroke after Bilal Khan dropped the ball which would fall onto Dodoz' foot to level the match. Dodoz scored a second to give Aizawl the lead before Lalkhawpuimawia scored the match winner only four minutes later with the shot being hammered past the defenders.

By virtue of finishing inside the top six in the I-League, they had a first-round bye in the 2018 Indian Super Cup. After the qualifying round was completed, they were drawn to take on ISL's Chennaiyin away from home. In the match, which was held at the end of the month, Aizawl opened the scoring from Andrei Ionescu as his shot deflected past Karanjit Singh to find the back of the net. An 89th-minute equalizer from Maílson Alves saw the game go into extra time. Andrei Ionescu got Aizawl the lead again in the first minute of extra time when he latched onto a low cross and curled his shot past the keeper. In the second half of extra time, the Aizawl defense made a critical mistake which gifted the equalizer when Dhanachandra Singh's low effort from a distance went past the crowded defense to the back of the net. The penalty shoot-out would see Aizawl qualify through to the quarterfinals as a miss from Mohammed Rafi was the difference in the shoot-out.

Between the I-League and the Indian Super Cup, Aizawl had their first match of the 2018 AFC Cup to play. After announcing their 26-man squad on 11 March, they traveled to meet Maldive champions New Radiant in the opening game. Aizawl drew first blood when Lalram Hmunmawia scored into the top left corner of the net in the 33rd minute. Seven minutes later, Ali Ashfaq slotted in the equalizer from an Ahmed Abdulla cross to level the scores at the half. Ashfawq scored two more goals in the second half with one in the 77th and 85th minute to seal the match for the Maldive champions. Aizawl had to play the final sixteen minutes with only ten men when Hmunmawia was sent off for bringing down substitute Guillem Martí Misut. He was suspended for the following match against Dhaka Abahani.

=== April ===
The opening match in April was a continental match against Bengaluru at home. After getting an early breakthrough in the fifth minute through Léonce Dodoz Zikahi, they conceded at the stroke of half-time with Daniel Lucas Segovia slotting home a penalty that was awarded after Dodoz handled the ball in the box. The second half saw Rahul Bheke give Bengaluru the lead in the 63rd minute as he headed it from Alwyn George. Another goal from substitute Lalhlimpuia would seal the 3–1 for the away team as he sent a low strike past Avilash.

In the quarter-final of the Super Cup against East Bengal, Aizawl was forced into a defense play because of constant threats from East Bengal. After a chance from Andrei Ionescu, the first half ended scoreless. The robust defense of East Benegal meant that Aizawl had to settle for shots from a distance. With the match entering injury-time, East Bengal was awarded a penalty when Ansumana Kromah was brought down by Lalawmpuia inside the box. Laldanmawia Ralte's penalty would be the only goal of the game and knocked Aizawl out of the tournament.

The two matches against Dhaka Abahani saw the team only scoring a point in the two games to be eliminated from contention. In the home match, Dhaka took just two minutes to open the scoring as Rubel Miya's effort deflected off Lalrosanga and looped into the net. Dhaka extended their lead in the 17th minute when Ndukaku Alison converted a scrappy effort from close-range after a corner was not cleared before Seiya Kojima made it 3–0 to end the match before half time. The reverse match saw Aizawl nearly get a goal in the 16th minute. Dhaka managed to take the lead in the 31st minute with Emeka Onuoha converting from the penalty spot. Aizawl got one back after the break with Andrei Ionescu scoring from a close-range finish in the 65th minute to give Aizawl a draw and their first continental point in the club's history.

=== May ===
On 2 May, Aizawl lost 0–5 to Bengaluru in an away encounter. Bottom-placed Aizawl began the match brightly, but Bengaluru soon wrestled control of the match with two quick-fire goals after the first quarter of an hour. Sunil Chhetri won and converted a penalty in the 16th minute before Segovia finished off Erik Paartalu's pass just moments later to make it 2–0. At the half-hour mark, visitors pulled away further with a third goal netted by Udanta Singh. In the 62nd minute, Segovia got his second goal of the evening with an improvised header to meet Subhasish Bose's cross. Substitute Lalhlimpuia completed the rout in the 89th minute, after flicking Chhetri's cut-back past the Aizawl keeper Lalawmpuia.

On 16 May, Aizawl earned a 2–1 win over New Radiant in a home encounter to knock the visitors out of the AFC Cup. This marked their first continental match win in this season. After a goalless first half, the home side had to wait until the 61st minute to break the deadlock when Leonce Dodoz Zikahi fired one home after Ionescu was tripped inside the box. Ionescu doubled Aizawl's lead eight minutes from time after he latched onto Laldinliana's long pass and outpaced his marker before beating the goalkeeper on the second attempt for a simple finish into the empty net. Hassan pulled one back for Maldivians, getting on the end of Gotor's nodded pass to finish past Avilash.

== Kit ==
Supplier: Vamos / Sponsor: NE Consultancy Services

Home	Away	Goalkeeper

== Coaching staff ==
Aizawl announced on 28 July 2017 that Paulo Menezes would be taking over as head coach. Menezes said:

I had learned about Indian football 4 years ago, and I have spoken to many people about it and how much it has grown over the years. I want to be part of this, and Aizawl FC is right at the heartbeat of this crescendo of development. I will like my players to play the offensive game with a high level of ball possession so that they can create many scoring chances. Depending on the game situation, we will vary the tempo of our attack, but the main focus is on the ball [retention]. I will like to help the players improve their skills – be it technically or tactically, so they can become more competitive and maintain a strong mentality before and during the game. I believe I can contribute to Indian football by getting as many of the local players into the National Team as possible.

Izan Martin Andres has been hired as assistant coach for this season.
On 12 February, Aizawl announced that they parted ways with their head coach, Paulo Menezes after seven consecutive winless streaks in their on-going I-League campaign and announced Santosh Kashyap as their replacement.

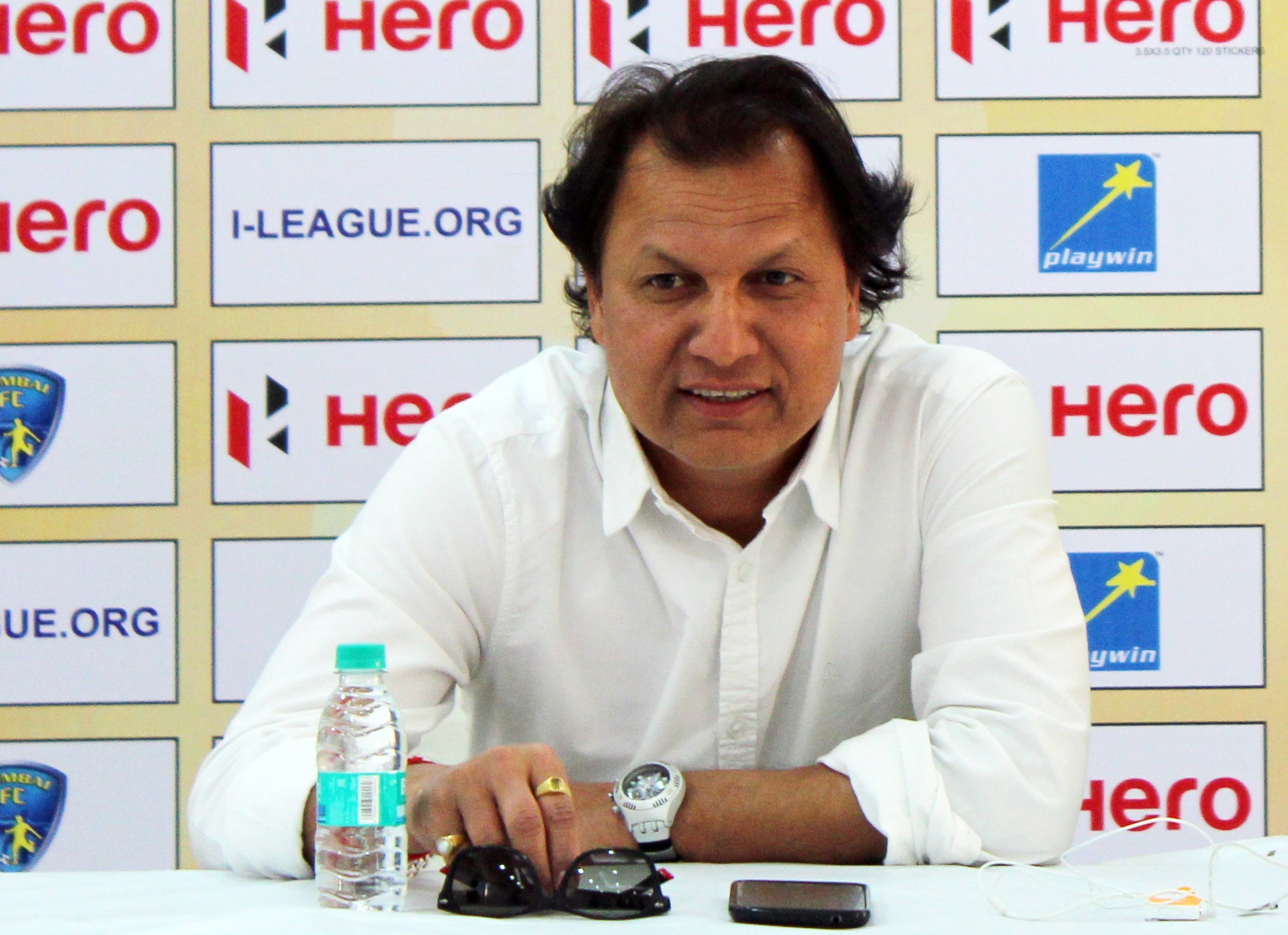
Santosh Kashyap appointed as head coach in February following the sacking of Paulo Menezes

=== Management ===
Position	Name
Head coach	(India) Santosh Kashyap
Team manager	(India) Hmingthan Sanga
Assistant coach	(India) B Malsawmzuala
Assistant manager	(India) Jonathan Lalbiakkima
Physio	(India) RK.Zothanpuia
Youth coach	(India) William Koso

== Transfers ==
=== In ===
No.	Position	Player	Previous club	Date	Ref
19	DF	(India) Lalchhuanawma Varte	(India) ONGC F.C.	20 June 2017	
17	MF	(India) David Lalrinmuana	(India) East Bengal	3 July 2017	
16	DF	(Nigeria) Kareem Omolaja	(India) Minerva Punjab	14 July 2017	
28	MF	(India) Shylo Malsawmtluanga	(India) Bhawanipore F.C.	26 July 2017	
3	DF	(India) Lalrozama Fanai	(India) Fateh Hyderabad	9 August 2017	
12	GK	(India) Avilash Paul	(India) Pune F.C.	18 August 2017	
14	FW	(Japan) Yugo Kobayashi	(Thailand) Songkhla United F.C.	18 August 2017	
10	FW	(Ivory Coast) Léonce Dodoz Zikahi	(India) Mohammedan Sporting	20 August 2017	
5	DF	(Afghanistan) Masih Saighani	(Germany) Türk Gücü Friedberg	24 August 2017	
22	MF	(Romania) Andrei Ionescu	(Romania) FC Voluntari	26 August 2017	
18	MF	(India) Liandala Fanai	(India) Chennai City F.C.	1 September 2017	
23	GK	(India) Arup Debnath	(India) NEROCA	7 November 2017	
9	FW	(India) Lalkhawpuimawia	(India) Chhinga Veng	1 January 2018	
21	MF	(India) H. Lalmuankima	(India) FC Goa	5 March 2018	

=== Out ===
No.	Position	Player	New club	Date	Ref
1	GK	(India) Albino Gomes	(India) Mumbai City FC	1 June 2017	End of Loan
3	DF	(Nigeria) Kingsley Obumneme	(India) Mohun Bagan	1 June 2017	
5	DF	(India) Zohmingliana Ralte	(India) Bengaluru FC	1 June 2017	
24	DF	(India) Lalthakima	(India) Kerala Blasters FC	1 June 2017	
27	DF	(India) Lalramchullova	(India) East Bengal	1 June 2017	
36	DF	(India) Ashutosh Mehta	(India) Mumbai City FC	1 June 2017	End of Loan
39	DF	(India) Lalruatthara	(India) Kerala Blasters FC	1 June 2017	
6	MF	(Syria) Mahmoud Amnah	(India) East Bengal	1 June 2017	
16	MF	(India) Jayesh Rane	(India) Chennaiyin FC	1 June 2017	End of Loan
17	MF	(India) Laldanmawia Ralte	(India) East Bengal	1 June 2017	
30	MF	(India) Brandon Vanlalremdika	(India) East Bengal	1 June 2017	
32	FW	(Ivory Coast) Kamo Stephane Bayi	(India) Mohun Bagan	1 June 2017	
20	GK	(India) Zothanmawia	(India) Chhinga Veng	1 June 2017	
21	MF	(India) H. Lalmuankima	(India) FC Goa	6 January 2018	

=== Loan-in ===
No.	Position	Player	Club	Date	Ref
	MF	(India) V Laltanpuia	(India) Mizoram Police FC	November 2017	
24	MF	(India) Lalthathanga Khawlhring	(India) NorthEast United FC	November 2017	
41	DF	(India) Lalchhawnkima	(India) Mumbai City FC	February 2018	

== Pre-season friendlies ==
AIzawl played a pre-season friendly match against ISL outfit, Chennaiyin FC behind closed doors. Chennaiyin FC defeated Aizawl by 1–0 with Mohammed Rafi scoring the lone goal of the match for the Chennai-based ISL team. They did not play any other pre-season friendly as they were playing in this season's Mizoram Premier League.

6 November 2017	Chennaiyin FC	1–0	Aizawl	Chennai
15:00 IST	Mohammed Rafi	Report		Stadium: Jawaharlal Nehru Stadium

== Competitions ==
=== Overview ===
Competition	First match	Last match	Starting round	Final position	Record							
Competition	First match	Last match	Starting round	Final position	Pld	W	D	L	GF	GA	GD	Win %
Mizoram Premier League	31 August 2017	8 December 2017	Matchday 1	Runners-up	17	8	5	4	39	20	+19	47.06
I-League	28 November 2017	2 March 2018	Matchday 1	5th	18	6	6	6	21	18	+3	33.33
Super Cup	31 March 2018	8 April 2018	Round of 16	Quarter-finals	2	1	0	1	7	6	+1	50.00
AFC Champions League	30 January 2018	30 January 2018	Play-off Round	Play-off Round	1	0	0	1	1	3	−2	0.00
AFC Cup	14 March 2018	16 May 2018	Group stage	Group stage	6	1	1	4	5	16	−11	16.67
Total					44	16	12	16	73	63	+10	36.36

Last updated: 16 May 2018.
Source: Competitions

=== Mizoram Premier League ===
Aizawl FC announced their squad for Mizoram Premier League on 28 August. They played their first match on 30 August against Ramhlun North. They finished the league as runners-up.

==== League table ====
Pos	Team	Pld	W	D	L	GF	GA	GD	Pts	Qualification or relegation
1	Chhinga Veng (C)	14	10	3	1	28	15	+13	33	Advance to Semi-finals
2	Aizawl	14	7	4	3	31	13	+18	25	Advance to Semi-finals
3	Mizoram Police FC	14	6	2	6	33	35	−2	20	Advance to Semi-finals
4	Chanmari	14	5	4	5	20	16	+4	19	Advance to Semi-finals
5	Ramhlun North	14	5	4	5	23	22	+1	19	

Source: goalie365.com
Rules for classification: 1) Points; 2) Goal difference; 3) Goals scored
(C) Champions

==== Result summary ====
Overall								Home						Away					
Pld	W	D	L	GF	GA	GD	Pts	W	D	L	GF	GA	GD	W	D	L	GF	GA	GD
14	7	4	3	31	13	+18	25	5	1	1	21	6	+15	2	3	2	10	7	+3

==== Results by match ====
Round	1	2	3	4	5	6	7	8	9	10	11	12	13	14
Ground	A	A	H	A	H	H	A	A	H	H	A	A	H	H
Result	D	D	D	L	W	W	L	D	W	W	W	W	W	L
Position	4	5	5	7	5	3	4	4	2	2	2	2	2	2

A = Away; H = Home; W = Win; D = Draw; L = Loss

==== Matches ====
31 August 2017 1	Ramhlun North	1–1	Aizawl	Aizawl
15:00 IST	Lalliansanga 12'		Jojo 35'	Stadium: Lammual

8 September 2017 2	Chanmari	1–1	Aizawl	Aizawl
15:00 IST	Lalmuanawma 26'	Report	David Lalrinmuana 45+2'	Stadium: Lammual

15 September 2017 3	Aizawl	2–2	Chhinga Veng	Aizawl
20:00 IST	Lalthathanga Khawlhring 19'; Jojo 47'	Report	Malsawmfela 22'; Lalhriatrenga 36' (o.g.)	Stadium: Lammual

18 September 2017 4	Chanmari West	1–0	Aizawl	Aizawl
15:00 IST	Lalremruata 74'	Report		Stadium: Lammual

21 September 2017 5	Aizawl	6–1	Mizoram Police FC	Aizawl
15:00 IST	Rochharzela 9', 36', 63'; Hmingthanmawia 35'; Alfred Jaryan 80'; Jojo 88'	Report	Kareem 78'	Stadium: Lammual

28 September 2017 6	Aizawl	3–0	Dinthar	Aizawl
15:00 IST	Kareem Omolaja 38'; Jojo 39'; H. Lalmuankima 88'	Report		Stadium: Lammual

3 October 2016 7	Bethlehem	2–0	Aizawl	Aizawl
19:30 IST	Dawngzela 36'; Samson Ramengmawia 45+2'	Report		Stadium: Lammual

13 October 2017 8	Mizoram Police FC	2–2	Aizawl	Aizawl
19:30 IST			William Lalnunfela 42'; Andrei Ionescu 57'	Stadium: Lammual

19 October 2017 9	Aizawl	3–1	Chanmari	Aizawl
15:00 IST	William Lalnunfela 33', 65'; Andrei Ionescu 37'	Report	Malsawmzuala 20'	Stadium: Lammual

24 October 2017 10	Aizawl	5–1	Bethlehem	Aizawl
15:00 IST	H. Lalmuankima 17'; David Lalrinmuana 25', 88'; Masih Saighani 35'; Rochharzela 72'	Report	Lalnuntluanga 20'	Stadium: Lammual

26 October 2017 11	Chhinga Veng	0–2	Aizawl	Aizawl
15:00 IST		Report	H. Lalmuankima 16'; Jojo 90+4'	Stadium: Lammual

1 November 2016 12	Dinthar	0–4	Aizawl	Aizawl
20:00 IST		Report	David Lalrinmuana 9'; H. Lalmuankima 21'; Andrei Ionescu 26'; William Lalnunfela 80'	Stadium: Lammual

10 November 2016 13	Aizawl	2–0	Chanmari West	Aizawl
19:30 IST	Masih Saighani 25'; William Lalnunfela 88'	Report		Stadium: Lammual

17 November 2016 14	Aizawl	0–1	Ramhlun North	Aizawl
19:30 IST		Report	Lalremruata 90+3'	Stadium: Lammual

Semi-finals

23 November 2017	Aizawl	2–2	Mizoram Police FC	Aizawl
19:30 IST	Masih Saighani 22'; Lalhriatrenga 85'	Report	Lalrinpuia 7'; Lalfakzuala 90+4'	Stadium: Lammual; Man of the Match: David Lalrinmuana (Aizawl)

4 December 2017	Mizoram Police FC	1–1 (3–3 agg.) (3–5 p)	Aizawl	Aizawl
19:30 IST	Lalbhiaklua 17'	Report	H. Lalmuankima 14'	Stadium: Lammual; Man of the Match: H. Lalmuankima (Aizawl FC)
	Penalties
	(penalty missed) Zomuanpuia; (penalty scored) Valpuia; (penalty scored) Lalrinchhana; (penalty scored) Lalbhiaklua		(penalty scored) David Lalrinmuana; (penalty scored) William Lalnunfela; (penalty scored) Lalrinzuala Khiangte; (penalty scored) Masih Saighani; (penalty scored) H. Lalmuankima

Final

8 December 2017	Chhinga Veng	1–0	Aizawl F.C.	Aizawl
19:30 IST	R Malsawmtluanga 5'	Report		Stadium: Lammual; Man of the Match: R Malsawmtluanga (Chhinga Veng)

Rochharzela was awarded the Best Young Player of the Tournament while H. Lalmuankima was awarded Best Forward of the Tournament.

=== I-League ===
The fixtures for the 2017–18 season were announced on 13 November 2017. Aizawl FC began their title defence against East Bengal on 28 November at Salt Lake Stadium. They ended the league finishing fifth.

==== League table ====
Pos	Team	Pld	W	D	L	GF	GA	GD	Pts
3	Mohun Bagan	18	8	7	3	28	14	+14	31
4	East Bengal	18	8	7	3	32	19	+13	31
5	Aizawl	18	6	6	6	21	18	+3	24
6	Shillong Lajong	18	6	4	8	17	25	−8	22
7	Gokulam Kerala	18	6	3	9	17	23	−6	21

Source: i-league.org
Rules for classification: 1) points; 2) head-to-head points; 3) head-to-head goal difference; 4) goal difference; 5) number of goals scored; 6) drawing of lots

==== Result summary ====
Overall								Home						Away					
Pld	W	D	L	GF	GA	GD	Pts	W	D	L	GF	GA	GD	W	D	L	GF	GA	GD
18	6	6	6	21	18	+3	24	5	2	2	13	6	+7	1	4	4	8	12	−4

Last updated: 2 March 2018.
Source: i-league.org

==== Results by match ====
Round	1	2	3	4	5	6	7	8	9	10	11	12	13	14	15	16	17	18
Ground	A	H	H	H	A	A	H	H	H	H	A	A	A	A	A	H	A	H
Result	D	W	L	W	W	L	W	D	L	D	D	L	D	D	L	W	L	W
Position	4	5	6	6	5	6	6	4	4	6	6	6	5	5	6	6	6	5

Source: i-league.org
A = Away; H = Home; W = Win; D = Draw; L = Loss

==== Matches ====
28 November 2017 1	East Bengal	2–2	Aizawl	Kolkata
20:00 IST	Eduardo Ferreira 66'; Katsumi Yusa 72'; Brandon Vanlalremdika (yellow card) 78'	Report	Alfred Jaryan (yellow card) 19'; Lalrinzuala Khiangte (yellow card) 43'; Masih Saighani (yellow card) 45+1'; William Lalnunfela 74', 90+4'; H. Lalmuankima (yellow card) 78'; Kareem Omolaja (yellow card) 80'	Stadium: Salt Lake Stadium; Attendance: 16611; Referee: Santosh Kumar; Man of the Match: Katsumi Yusa (East Bengal FC)

13 December 2017 2	Aizawl	1–0	Churchill Brothers	Aizawl
14:00 IST	Lalrinzuala Khiangte (yellow card) 59'; H. Lalmuankima (yellow card) 87'; Yugo Kobayashi 88' (yellow card) 89'	Report	Monday Osagie (yellow card) 90+5'	Stadium: Rajiv Gandhi Stadium; Attendance: 2,875; Referee: Pratik Mondal; Man of the Match: Masih Saighani (Aizawl FC)

18 December 2017 3	Aizawl	0–1	Shillong Lajong	Aizawl
14:00 IST	Lalrinzuala Khiangte (yellow card) 31'; Masih Saighani (yellow card) 90+1'	Report	Redeem Tlang 60'; Novin Gurung (yellow card) 74'; Phurba Lachenpa (yellow card) 90+1'	Stadium: Rajiv Gandhi Stadium (Aizawl); Attendance: 3,800; Referee: Om Prakash Thakur; Man of the Match: Redeem Tlang (Shillong Lajong FC)

27 December 2017 4	Aizawl	2–1	Minerva Punjab	Aizawl
14:00 IST	Kareem Omolaja 72'; Masih Saighani (yellow card) 75'; Andrei Ionescu 86'	Report	Chencho Gyeltshen (yellow card) 61'; Amandeep Singh (yellow card) 78'; Girik Khosla 90+4'	Stadium: Rajiv Gandhi Stadium (Aizawl); Attendance: 4,200; Referee: Raktim Saha; Man of the Match: Léonce Dodoz Zikahi (Aizawl FC)

31 December 2017 5	Gokulam Kerala	0–2	Aizawl	Kozhikode
14:00 IST	Mohammed Irshad (yellow card) 45+2'; Santu Singh (yellow card) 68'	Report	Yugo Kobayashi 45'; Andrei Ionescu 52'; Laldinliana Renthlei (yellow card) 90+2'	Stadium: EMS Stadium; Attendance: 3,720; Referee: Priyobatra Singh Langpoklakpam; Man of the Match: Andrei Ionescu (Aizawl FC)

7 January 2018 6	Mohun Bagan	2–0	Aizawl	Kolkata
14:00 IST	Ricky Lallawmawma (yellow card) 19'; Masih Saighani 54' (o.g.); Aser Pierrick Dipanda 75'; Kingsley Obumneme (yellow card) 81'; Raynier Fernandes (yellow card) 81'	Report	William Lalnunfela (yellow card) 40'; Kareem Omolaja (yellow card) 49'; Lalthathanga Khawlhring (yellow card) 88'; Lalram Hmunmawia (yellow card) 90+1'	Stadium: Salt Lake Stadium; Attendance: 5,785; Referee: Ajitkumar Meitei Lairenlakpam; Man of the Match: Aser Pierrick Dipanda (Mohun Bagan AC)

13 January 2018 7	Aizawl	2–0	Chennai City	Aizawl
14:00 IST	Yugo Kobayashi 26' (pen.); David Lalrinmuana 33'	Report	Tarif Akhand (yellow card) 81'	Stadium: Rajiv Gandhi Stadium (Aizawl); Attendance: 3,620; Referee: Om Prakash Thakur; Man of the Match: David Lalrinmuana (Aizawl FC)

16 January 2018 8	Aizawl	0–0	East Bengal	Aizawl
14:00 IST	Masih Saighani (yellow card) 60'; Alfred Jaryan (yellow card) 63'	Report	Laldanmawia Ralte (yellow card) 10'; Lalramchullova (yellow card) 54'; Katsumi Yusa (yellow card) 60'	Stadium: Rajiv Gandhi Stadium (Aizawl); Attendance: 7,280; Referee: Rosario Fernandes; Man of the Match: Avilash Paul (Aizawl FC)

20 January 2018 9	Aizawl	1–2	NEROCA	Aizawl
14:00 IST	Kareem Omolaja 39'; Alfred Jaryan (yellow card) 72'; C Lalrosanga (yellow card) 78'	Report	Ashok Singh (yellow card) 30'; Felix Chidi Odili 64'; Nedo Turković 86'; David Lalbiakzara (yellow card) 87'	Stadium: Rajiv Gandhi Stadium (Aizawl); Attendance: 7,250; Referee: Raktim Saha; Man of the Match: Felix Chidi Odili (NEROCA FC)

25 January 2018 10	Aizawl	1–1	Mohun Bagan	Aizawl
14:00 IST	Yugo Kobayashi (yellow card) 1'; Lalthathanga Khawlhring 73'; C Lalrosanga (yellow card) 85'; Alfred Jaryan (red card) 89'	Report	Manandeep Singh (yellow card) 56' (goal) 77' (pen.); Raynier Fernandes (yellow card) 85'	Stadium: Rajiv Gandhi Stadium (Aizawl); Attendance: 3,272; Referee: Senthil Nathan; Man of the Match: Léonce Dodoz Zikahi (Aizawl FC)

3 February 2018 11	Chennai City	1–1	Aizawl	Coimbatore
14:00 IST	Antony Beautin 73'	Report	Yugo Kobayashi 3'; Lalhriatrenga (yellow card) 55'; Masih Saighani (yellow card) 88'	Stadium: Jawaharlal Nehru Stadium; Attendance: 4,082; Referee: Parmanand Jaganath Mandrekar; Man of the Match: Michael Soosairaj (Chennai City FC)

6 February 2018 12	Churchill Brothers	1–0	Aizawl	Vasco da Gama
17:30 IST	Mechac Koffi 21'; Hussein Eldor (yellow card) 43'; Wayne Vaz (yellow card) 74'	Report	Andrei Ionescu (yellow card) 45'; Léonce Dodoz Zikahi (yellow card) 54'; C Lalrosanga (red card) 80'	Stadium: Tilak Maidan Stadium; Attendance: 3,116; Referee: Pratik Mondal; Man of the Match: Monday Osagie (Churchill Brothers SC)

10 February 2018 13	NEROCA	0–0	Aizawl	Imphal
14:00 IST	Thangjam Singh (yellow card) 68'	Report		Stadium: Khuman Lampak Main Stadium; Attendance: 20,345; Referee: Tanmoy Dhar; Man of the Match: Lalram Hmunmawia (Aizawl FC)

16 February 2018 14	Indian Arrows	2–2	Aizawl	Vasco da Gama
17:30 IST	Edmund Lalrindika 48'; Amarjit Singh Kiyam 89' (pen.)	Report	Masih Saighani 40'; Léonce Dodoz Zikahi 54'; C Lalrosanga (yellow card) 56' (yellow-red card) 88'	Stadium: Tilak Maidan Stadium; Attendance: 3,175; Referee: C. R. Srikrishna; Man of the Match: Edmund Lalrindika (Indian Arrows)

19 February 2018 15	Shillong Lajong	2–1	Aizawl	Shillong
20:00 IST	Redeem Tlang (yellow card) 41'; Abdoulaye Koffi 58'; Saihou Jagne 73'	Report	Laldinliana Renthlei (yellow card) 31'; Léonce Dodoz Zikahi 90+5'	Stadium: Jawaharlal Nehru Stadium; Attendance: 6,300; Referee: Pratik Mondal; Man of the Match: Saihou Jagne (Shillong Lajong FC)

23 February 2018 16	Aizawl	3–0	Indian Arrows	Aizawl
14:00 IST	Andrei Ionescu 7'; Lalkhawpuimawia 16', 87' (yellow card) 59'; Rochharzela (yellow card) 67'	Report		Stadium: Rajiv Gandhi Stadium (Aizawl); Attendance: 3,200; Referee: Rosario Fernandes; Man of the Match: Lalkhawpuimawia (Aizawl FC)

26 February 2018 17	Minerva Punjab	2–0	Aizawl	Panchkula
14:00 IST	Akash Sangwan 50'; Akashdeep Singh (yellow card) 59'; Armand Bazie 90+5'	Report	David Lalrinmuana (yellow card) 90+5'	Stadium: Tau Devi Lal Stadium; Attendance: 4428; Referee: Khamruddin Mohammed Avez; Man of the Match: Guy Eric Dano (Minerva Punjab FC)

2 March 2018 18	Aizawl	3–1	Gokulam Kerala	Aizawl
14:00 IST	Masih Saighani (yellow card) 43'; Léonce Dodoz Zikahi (yellow card) 57' (goal) 59', 74'; Lalkhawpuimawia 78'	Report	Mahmood Al-Ajmi 25' (pen.) (yellow card) 55'; Emmanuel Chigozie (yellow card) 83'	Stadium: Rajiv Gandhi Stadium (Aizawl); Attendance: 2,800; Referee: Crystal John; Man of the Match: Léonce Dodoz Zikahi (Aizawl FC)

=== Super Cup ===
As they were one of the top six teams of the previous season, Aizawl FC qualified for the main round in the 2018 Indian Super Cup. They met ISL Champions, Chennaiyin in the Round of 16. After they won their opening match on penalties after going behind by a single goal, they would be knocked out in the quarter-final stage by East Bengal.

31 March 2018 Round of 16	Chennaiyin	2–2 (a.e.t.) (3–5 p)	Aizawl	Bhubaneshwar
20:00 IST	Ganesh (yellow card) 34'; B Singh (yellow card) 52'; Alves 89' (yellow card) 94'; D Singh 114'	Report	Ionescu 22', 91' (yellow card) 64'; Jaryan (yellow card) 71'	Stadium: Kalinga Stadium; Attendance: 5,000; Referee: Pranjal Banerjee; Man of the Match: Andrei Ionescu (Aizawl FC)
	Penalties
	(penalty scored) B Singh; (penalty missed) Rafi; (penalty scored) D Singh; (penalty scored) Ganesh		(penalty scored) Ionescu; (penalty scored) Zikahi; (penalty scored) Saighani; (penalty scored) Lalchhawnkima; (penalty scored) Lalmuankima

8 April 2018 Quarter-final	Aizawl	0–1	East Bengal	Bhubaneshwar
16:00 IST	Hmingthanmawia (yellow card) 33'; C Lalrosanga (yellow card) 77'; Saighani (yellow card) 81'	Report	Aucho (yellow card) 62'; Ralte 90+6' (pen.)	Stadium: Kalinga Stadium; Attendance: 3,286; Referee: C. R. Srikrishna; Man of the Match: Laldanmawia Ralte (East Bengal FC)

=== AFC Champions League ===
As they were champions in the previous season, Aizawl FC competed in the play-off round for a spot in the group stage. On 6 November, they were too drawn to meet Iranian champions Zob Ahan at home. Aizawl FC lost 3–1 with Andrei Ionescu being the only goalscorer for Aizawl as they were knocked out of the 2018 AFC Champions League and relegated to the AFC Cup.

30 January 2018 PL	Zob Ahan (Iran)	3–1	(India) Aizawl FC	Isfahan
17:00 (IRST)	Mehdi Rajabzadeh 3' (pen.); Morteza Tabrizi 83', 90+3'	Report	Andrei Ionescu 21'; C Lalrosanga (yellow card) 90'	Stadium: Foolad Shahr Stadium; Attendance: 3,000; Referee: Nivon Robesh Gamini (Sri Lanka)

=== AFC Cup ===
Aizawl FC competed in Group E alongside Maldives champion New Radiant, the Bangladeshi champion in Dhaka Abahani and winner of the South Asia play-off, Bengaluru. They were knocked out of the tournament after finishing last in Group E.

==== Group stage ====
Group E

Pos	Team	Pld	W	D	L	GF	GA	GD	Pts	Qualification	BFC	RAD	ABD	AIZ
1	(India) Bengaluru	6	5	0	1	14	3	+11	15	Inter-zone play-off semi-finals	—	1–0	1–0	5–0
2	(Maldives) New Radiant	6	4	0	2	12	5	+7	12		2–0	—	5–1	3–1
3	(Bangladesh) Abahani Limited Dhaka	6	1	1	4	5	12	−7	4		0–4	0–1	—	1–1
4	(India) Aizawl	6	1	1	4	5	16	−11	4 (Note: Head-to-head results: Aizawl 0–3 Abahani Limited Dhaka, Abahani Limited Dhaka 1–1 Aizawl.)		1–3	2–1	0–3	—

Source: AFC
Notes:

Matches

14 March 2018	New Radiant (Maldives)	3–1	(India) Aizawl FC	Malé
16:00 UTC+5	Ali Ashfaq 40', 77', 85'	Report	Lalchhuanawma Varte (yellow card) 24'; Lalram Hmunmawia 33' (yellow card) 70' (red card) 74'; Masih Saighani (yellow card) 45'; Albert Zohmingmawia (yellow card) 45+2'	Stadium: Rasmee Dhandu Stadium; Attendance: 1,893; Referee: Ahmad A'Qashah (Singapore)

5 April 2018	Aizawl FC (India)	1–3	(India) Bengaluru FC	Guwahati
18:30 UTC+5:30	Léonce Dodoz Zikahi 5'	Report	Daniel Lucas Segovia 45+1' (pen.); Rahul Bheke 63'; Daniel Lalhlimpuia 77'	Stadium: Indira Gandhi Athletic Stadium; Attendance: 879; Referee: Ahmad Ibrahim (Jordan)

11 April 2018	Aizawl FC (India)	0–3	(Bangladesh) Dhaka Abahani	Guwahati
18:30 UTC+5:30	Hmingthanmawia (yellow card) 72'	Report	Rubel Miya 2'; Ndukaku Alison 17'; Seiya Kojima 37'; Sunday Chizoba (yellow card) 41'	Stadium: Indira Gandhi Athletic Stadium; Attendance: 435; Referee: Dmitry Mashentsev (Kyrgyzstan)

25 April 2018	Dhaka Abahani (Bangladesh)	1–1	(India) Aizawl FC	Dhaka
18:00 UTC+6	Emeka Onuoha 31' (pen.); Waly Faisal (yellow card) 39'; Mohammad Fahad (yellow card) 85'	Report	Andrei Ionescu 65'; Hmingthanmawia (yellow card) 85'	Stadium: Bangabandhu National Stadium; Attendance: 800; Referee: Baraa Aisha (Palestine)

2 May 2018	Bengaluru FC (India)	5–0	(India) Aizawl FC	Bengaluru
20:00 UTC+5:30	Sunil Chhetri 16' (pen.); Daniel Lucas Segovia 17', 62'; Udanta Singh 30'; Víctor Pérez Alonso (yellow card) 82'; Daniel Lalhlimpuia 89'	Report	C Lalrosanga (yellow card) 71'	Stadium: Sree Kanteerava Stadium; Attendance: 1,570; Referee: Zaid Thamer Mohammed (Iraq)

16 May 2018	Aizawl FC (India)	2–1	(Maldives) New Radiant	Guwahati
18:45 UTC+5:30	Masih Saighani (yellow card) 26'; Alfred Jaryan (yellow card) 36'; Léonce Dodoz Zikahi 61' (pen.) (yellow card) 77'; Laldinliana Renthlei (yellow card) 68'; Avilash Paul (yellow card) 72'; Andrei Ionescu 82'	Report	Hamza Mohamed (yellow card) 14'; Ibrahim Atheeg Hassan 85'; Rilwan Waheed (yellow card) 90+4'	Stadium: Indira Gandhi Athletic Stadium; Attendance: 238; Referee: Sultan Al-Marzooqi (United Arab Emirates)

== Statistics ==
=== Appearances and goals ===
No.	Pos	Nat	Player	Total		MPL		I-League		AFC CL		AFC Cup		Super Cup	
No.	Pos	Nat	Player	Apps	Goals	Apps	Goals	Apps	Goals	Apps	Goals	Apps	Goals	Apps	Goals
Goalkeepers
1	GK	(India) IND	Lalremruata	2	0	2	0	0	0	0	0	0	0	0	0
12	GK	(India) IND	Avilash Paul	33	0	12	0	17	0	1	0	3	0	0	0
23	GK	(India) IND	Arup Debnath	1	0	0	0	0	0	0	0	0	0	1	0
44	GK	(India) IND	Lalawmpuia	8	0	3	0	1	0	0	0	3	0	1	0
Defenders
2	DF	(India) IND	Ramdinsanga	1	0	1	0	0	0	0	0	0	0	0	0
3	DF	(India) IND	Lalrozama Fanai	10	0	6	0	3	0	0	0	0+1	0	0	0
4	DF	(India) IND	Lalrinzuala Khiangte	19	1	16	1	3	0	0	0	0	0	0	0
5	DF	(Afghanistan) AFG	Masih Saighani	32	6	9	4	14	1	1	0	6	0	2	1
16	DF	(Nigeria) NGR	Kareem Omolaja	15	3	6	1	9	2	0	0	0	0	0	0
19	DF	(India) IND	Lalchhuanawma Varte	5	0	0	0	0+1	0	0	0	3	0	0+1	0
25	DF	(India) IND	Lalram Hmunmawia	31	1	9	0	13+1	0	1	0	5	1	2	0
26	DF	(India) IND	Laldinliana Renthlei	24	0	0	0	15	0	1	0	6	0	2	0
27	DF	(India) IND	Lalhriatrenga	18	1	16	1	2	0	0	0	0	0	0	0
29	DF	(India) IND	C Lalrosanga	16	0	0	0	7+1	0	1	0	5	0	2	0
30	DF	(India) IND	Jonathan Lalhriatkima	1	0	1	0	0	0	0	0	0	0	0	0
31	DF	(India) IND	Hmingthanmawia	20	1	3	1	6+4	0	0	0	5	0	2	0
41	DF	(India) IND	Lalchhawnkima	6	1	0	0	4	0	0	0	0	0	2	1
Midfielders
7	MF	(India) IND	Rochharzela	17	4	9	4	0+7	0	0+1	0	0	0	0	0
8	MF	(India) IND	H. Lalbiakthanga	9	0	7	0	1+1	0	0	0	0	0	0	0
11	MF	(India) IND	Albert Zohmingmawia	22	0	8	0	8+2	0	1	0	3	0	0	0
17	MF	(India) IND	David Lalrinmuana	34	6	16	5	10+3	1	1	0	1+3	0	0	0
18	MF	(India) IND	Liandala Fanai	10	0	4	0	2+1	0	0	0	0+3	0	0	0
20	MF	(Liberia) LBR	Alfred Jaryan (captain)	33	1	7	1	16+1	0	1	0	6	0	2	0
21	MF	(India) IND	H. Lalmuankima	18	7	11	6	5	0	0	0	0	0	1+1	1
22	MF	(Romania) ROU	Andrei Ionescu	32	12	7	3	15+1	3	1	1	5+1	2	2	3
24	MF	(India) IND	Lalthathanga Khawlhring	36	2	12	1	10+6	1	1	0	4+2	0	0+1	0
28	MF	(India) IND	Shylo Malsawmtluanga	15	0	6	0	4+3	0	1	0	1	0	0	0
Forwards
9	FW	(India) IND	Lalkhawpuimawia	16	3	0	0	3+5	3	0+1	0	4+1	0	1+1	0
10	FW	(Nigeria) NGR	Léonce Dodoz Zikahi	26	7	0	0	17+1	4	0	0	6	2	2	1
13	FW	(India) IND	Jonathan Lalrawngbawla	13	5	7	5	0+2	0	0	0	0+4	0	0	0
14	FW	(Japan) JPN	Yugo Kobayashi	12	4	0	0	9+3	4	0	0	0	0	0	0
32	FW	(India) IND	Lalruatfela Zote	2	0	0	0	0+2	0	0	0	0	0	0	0
49	FW	(India) IND	William Lalnunfela	18	8	10	6	4+2	2	0+1	0	0+1	0	0	0
	FW	(India) IND	F.Lalremsanga	2	0	2	0	0	0	0	0	0	0	0	0

- Source: soccerway

Updated: 16 May 2018

=== Top scorers ===
The list is sorted by shirt number when total goals are equal.

Rnk	Pos	No.	Player	MPL	I-League	AFC CL	AFC Cup	Super Cup	Total
1	MF	22	(Romania) Andrei Ionescu	3	3	1	2	3	12
2	FW	49	(India) William Lalnunfela	6	2	0	0	0	8
3	FW	10	(Nigeria) Léonce Dodoz Zikahi	0	4	0	2	1	7
3	MF	21	(India) H. Lalmuankima	6	0	0	0	1	7
4	DF	5	(Afghanistan) Masih Saighani	4	1	0	0	1	6
4	MF	17	(India) David Lalrinmuana	5	1	0	0	0	6
7	FW	13	(India) Jonathan Lalrawngbawla	5	0	0	0	0	5
8	FW	7	(India) Rochharzela	4	0	0	0	0	4
8	FW	14	(Japan) Yugo Kobayashi	0	4	0	0	0	4
10	FW	9	(India) Lalkhawpuimawia	0	3	0	0	0	3
10	DF	16	(Nigeria) Kareem Omolaja	1	2	0	0	0	3
12	MF	24	(India) Lalthathanga Khawlhring	1	1	0	0	0	2
13	DF	4	(India) Lalrinzuala Khiangte	1	0	0	0	0	1
13	MF	20	(Liberia) Alfred Jaryan	1	0	0	0	0	1
13	DF	25	(India) Lalram Hmunmawia	0	0	0	1	0	1
13	DF	27	(India) Lalhriatrenga	1	0	0	0	0	1
13	DF	31	(India) Hmingthanmawia	1	0	0	0	0	1
13	DF	41	(India) Lalchhawnkima	0	0	0	0	1	1
#	Own Goals			0	0	0	0	0	0
Total				39	21	1	5	7	73

Last updated: 16 May 2018.
Source: soccerway

==== Hat-tricks ====
Player	Against	Result	Date	Competition
(India) Rochharzela	Mizoram Police	6–1 (H)	21 September 2017	Mizoram Premier League
(Romania) Andrei Ionescu	Chennaiyin FC	7–5 (N)	31 March 2018	Super Cup

=== Clean sheets ===
The list is sorted by shirt number when total clean sheets are equal.

Rnk	No.	Player	MPL	I-League	AFC CL	AFC Cup	Super Cup	Total
1	12	(India) Avilash Paul	2	6	0	0	0	8
2	1	(India) Lalremruata	1	0	0	0	0	1
2	44	(India) Lalawmpuia	1	0	0	0	0	1

Last updated: 16 May 2018.
Source: ESPN

=== Disciplinary record ===
Includes all competitive matches. Players listed below made at least one appearance for Aizawl FC during the season.

N	P	Nat.	Name	I-League			AFC CL			AFC Cup			Super Cup			Total			Notes
N	P	Nat.	Name	Yellow card	Second yellow card	Red card	Yellow card	Second yellow card	Red card	Yellow card	Second yellow card	Red card	Yellow card	Second yellow card	Red card	Yellow card	Second yellow card	Red card	Notes
4	DF	(India)	Lalrinzuala Khiangte	3												3			
5	DF	(Afghanistan)	Masih Saighani	6						2			1			9			Missed a game, against NEROCA F.C. (4 yellow cards) (20 January 2018)
7	MF	(India)	Rochharzela	1												1			
9	FW	(India)	Lalkhawpuimawia	1												1			
10	FW	(Nigeria)	Léonce Dodoz Zikahi	2						1						3			
11	MF	(India)	Albert Zohmingmawia							1						1			
12	GK	(India)	Avilash Paul							1						1			
14	FW	(Japan)	Yugo Kobayashi	2												2			
16	DF	(Nigeria)	Kareem Omolaja	2												2			
17	FW	(India)	David Lalrinmuana	1												1			
19	DF	(India)	Lalchhuanawma Varte							1						1			
20	MF	(Liberia)	Alfred Jaryan	3		1				1			1			5		1	Missed a game, against Chennai City F.C. (red card) (3 February 2018)
21	MF	(India)	H. Lalmuankima	2												2			
22	MF	(Romania)	Andrei Ionescu	1									1			2			
24	MF	(India)	Lalthathanga Khawlhring	1												1			
25	DF	(India)	Lalram Hmunmawia	1						1		1				2		1	Missed a game, against Bengaluru F.C. in 2018 AFC Cup (red card) (5 April 2018)
26	DF	(India)	Laldinliana Renthlei	2						1						3			
27	DF	(India)	Lalhriatrenga	1												1			
29	DF	(India)	C Lalrosanga	2	1	1	1			1			1			5	1	1	Missed a game, against NEROCA F.C. (red card) (10 February 2018); Missed a game, against Shillong Lajong F.C. (red card) (19 February 2018)
31	DF	(India)	Hmingthanmawia							2			1			3			
49	FW	(India)	William Lalnunfela	1												1			

Last updated: 16 May 2018
Source: soccerway
Only competitive matches
(yellow card) = Number of bookings; (second yellow card) = Number of sending offs after a second yellow card; (red card) = Number of sending offs by a direct red card.

== Awards ==
=== Player ===
No.	Player	Award	Tournament	Source
7	(India) Rochharzela	Best Young Player of the Tournament	Mizoram Premier League	
21	(India) H. Lalmuankima	Best Forward of the Tournament	Mizoram Premier League	

== See also ==
- 2017–18 I-League
