= William Lalnunfela =

Indian footballer (born 1995)

Personal information
- Date of birth: 6 July 1995 (age 31)
- Place of birth: Kolasib, Mizoram, India
- Height: 1.80 m (5 ft 11 in)
- Position: Striker

Team information
- Current team: Kerala United
- Number: 49

Youth career
- Pui Pui
- Vengthar VC
- 2011–2013: Pune
- 2013–2014: Chanmari

Senior career*
Years	Team	Apps	(Gls)
2015–2018	Aizawl	16	(3)
2018–2019	Mohun Bagan	7	(1)
2019-2020	Aizawl	12	(2)
2020–2021	Jamshedpur	11	(0)
2021–2022	NorthEast United	2	(0)
2022–2023	Rajasthan United	0	(0)
2023–	Kerala United	9	(3)
- * Club domestic league appearances and goals as of 21:47, 11 September 2024 (UTC)

William Lalnunfela (born 6 July 1995) is an Indian professional footballer who plays as a forward for Kerala United in the I-League 3.

== Career ==
=== Early career ===
Born in Kolasib, Mizoram, Lalnunfela started playing football at the age of twelve, starting off as a goalkeeper before switching to a striker. He spent the first two seasons of his footballing career with his local club, Pui Pui, before joining the under-16 side of his village team, Vengthar VC. After playing for the club in a Red-Ribbon inter-village tournament, Lalnunfela was scouted by Pune, an I-League club, and was told to trial with their academy. With the Pune Academy, Lalnunfela finished as the top scorer in the 2013 edition of the I-League U20 while the academy won the tournament a consecutive season. After graduating from the academy in 2013, Lalnunfela moved back to his home state and signed with Chanmari. He also played for the Mizoram state side in the Santosh Trophy in 2014 and 2015 and the side that won the gold medal for football at the 2015 National Games of India.

=== Aizawl ===
His consistent performances in the domestic league for Chanmari attracted interest from Aizawl FC in 2015.

In 2015, Lalnunfela joined Aizawl and played for the club in the I-League 2nd Division the season they earned promotion to the I-League and the Mizoram Premier League. He made his professional debut for the club in the I-League on 28 February 2016 against Bengaluru FC. He came on as a halftime substitute for Albert Zohmingmawia as Aizawl lost 1–0.The 25-year old gradually grew in stature at Aizawl FC and played a crucial role in their historic I-League quest in the 2016–17 season under the tutelage of Khalid Jamil. Apart from scoring goals, William is known for his blistering pace and ability to play in multiple attacking positions.

=== Mohun Bagan ===
His talent stood out and Kolkata giants Mohun Bagan signed him in 2018 and he spent a season in Kolkata. He featured in 12 matches for the Mariners and scored twice and also registered an assist.

=== Aizawl ===
After only one season in Kolkata with Mohun Bagan, he came back to Aizawl plied his trade for the Reds in the last I-League season. He played 12 scored 2 times and provided one assist.

=== Jamshedpur FC ===
On 13 September 2020, William Lalnunfela penned down a three-year contract with Jamshedpur FC which will see him wearing the club colours till 2023.

=== NorthEast United FC ===
On 11 September 2021, it was announced that Lalnunfela was signed by NorthEast United ahead of the 2021–22 season.

== Career statistics ==
=== Club ===
As of 6 January 2022

Club	Season	League			Cup		AFC		Total	
Club	Season	Division	Apps	Goals	Apps	Goals	Apps	Goals	Apps	Goals
Aizawl	2015–16	I-League	2	0	0	0	—		2	0
Aizawl	2016–17	I-League	8	1	3 (Note: Appearance(s) in Federation Cup)	0	—		11	1
Aizawl	2017–18	I-League	6	2	0	0	2 (Note: Appearance(s) in AFC Champions League) (Note: Appearance(s) in AFC Cup)	0	8	2
Aizawl	Aizawl total		16	3	3	0	2	0	21	3
Mohun Bagan	2018–19	I-League	7	1	0	0	—		7	1
Aizawl	2019–20	I-League	12	2	0	0	—		12	2
Jamshedpur	2020–21	Indian Super League	11	0	0	0	—		11	0
NorthEast United	2021–22	Indian Super League	2	0	0	0	—		2	0
Rajasthan United	2022–23	I-League	0	0	0	0	—		0	0
Career total			48	6	3	0	2	0	53	6

== Honours ==
=== Club ===
Aizawl FC

- I-League(1): 2016–17

Mohun Bagan

- Calcutta Football League (1): 2018–19
