= Lalrinzuala Khiangte =

Indian footballer

Personal information
- Full name: Lalrinzuala Khiangte
- Date of birth: 9 November 1994 (age 32)
- Place of birth: Mizoram, India
- Position: Midfielder

Team information
- Current team: Mohun Bagan
- Number: 3

Youth career
- Shillong Lajong

Senior career*
Years	Team	Apps	(Gls)
2012–2014	Shillong Lajong	1	(0)
2015–2016	Zo United	0	(0)
2016–2018	Aizawl	12	(0)
2018–	Mohun Bagan	2	(0)
- * Club domestic league appearances and goals as of 4 March 2017

Lalrinzuala Khiangte (born 9 November 1994) is an Indian professional footballer who plays as a midfielder for Mohun Bagan in the I-League.

== Career ==
Born in Mizoram, Khiangte is a product of the academy at Shillong Lajong. He made his professional debut for the I-League club on 22 September 2016 in the Federation Cup against Dempo. Despite losing 1–0, Shillong Lajong head coach, Des Bulpin, praised Khiangte for his performance stating: "He was excellent and deserved to play along with his seniors today". He made his I-League debut for the club soon after, on 17 November 2012, against Mumbai. He started the match in the absence of Ebi Sukore and Minchol Son as Shillong Lajong lost 4–1.

After being released by Shillong Lajong, Khiangte returned to Mizoram. He was selected to be part of the Mizoram football team that participated in the Santosh Trophy. He soon also signed with Zo United of the Mizoram Premier League.

In 2016, Khiangte was playing for Aizawl in the Mizoram Premier League.

In 2018, Khiangte is playing for Mohun Bagan in the I-League.

== Professional statistics ==
As of 24 February 2018

Club	Season	League			League Cup		Domestic Cup		Continental		Total	
Club	Season	Division	Apps	Goals	Apps	Goals	Apps	Goals	Apps	Goals	Apps	Goals
Shillong Lajong	2012–13	I-League	1	0	—	—	1	0	—	—	2	0
Aizawl	2016–17	I-League	8	0	—	—	0	0	—	—	8	0
Aizawl	2017–18	I-League	3	0	—	—	0	0	—	—	3	0
Career total			12	0	0	0	1	0	0	0	13	0
