= Abdoulaye Kanouté =

Malian footballer

Personal information
- Date of birth: 14 May 1992 (age 34)
- Place of birth: Bamako, Mali
- Height: 1.90 m (6 ft 3 in)
- Position: Striker

Team information
- Current team: Gokulam Kerala B
- Number: 8

Senior career*
Years	Team	Apps	(Gls)
2004–2010	AS Bamako	22	(7)
2014–2015	Jeanne d'Arc	26	(10)
2014–2015	Ghazieh	19	(27)
2015–2016	Al Nabi Chit	2	(1)
2016–2017	Shabab Sahel	2	(2)
2017–2018	Rivers United	12	(7)
2018–2019	Bourj	15	(11)
2019–2020	Aizawl	9	(4)
2021–2022	Al Sadaqa		
2022–	Gokulam Kerala B	?	(1)

International career
2015	Mali U23	1	(0)
- * Club domestic league appearances and goals as of 17:21, 18 February 2022 (UTC)

Abdoulaye Kanouté (born 14 May 1992) is a Malian professional footballer who plays as a forward for Gokulam Kerala B in the Kerala Premier League.

== Club career ==
Born in Mali, Kanouté was included in the Lebanese sides Chabab Ghazieh SC and Bekaa in his initial years but he made his senior debut with Shabab Sahel, a Lebanese Premier League side in the 2016–17 season.

=== Aizawl ===
In November 2019, Kanouté moved to Indian club Aizawl for the upcoming I-League season.

On 6 December, Kanouté made his debut for the club in a 1–0 away loss, against NEROCA. He scored his first goal on 4 January, in a 1–1 stalemate against Gokulam Kerala. His sublime volley in the 14th-minute gave Aizawl the lead. On 11 February, he scored a brace off the bench to give Aizawl a 2–0 win over TRAU.

He scored four goals in nine matches during the league season which was stopped midway due to the COVID-19 pandemic in India.

=== Gokulam Kerala B ===
On 2022, Gokulam Kerala B roped in Kanouté for the upcoming Kerala Premier League season. On 18 February, he scored a header from a corner against AIFA in a 2–0 win.
