= Andrei Ionescu =

Romanian footballer

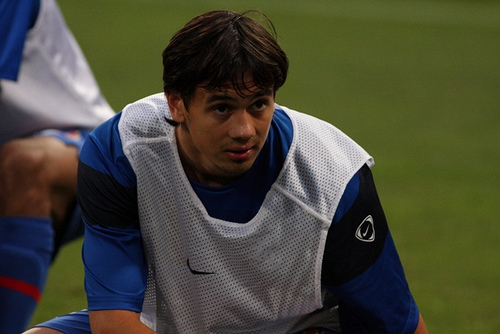
- Ionescu warming up for Steaua

Personal information
- Full name: Andrei Ionescu
- Date of birth: 29 March 1988 (age 38)
- Place of birth: Craiova, Romania
- Height: 1.74 m (5 ft 9 in)
- Position: Attacking midfielder

Youth career
- 1995–2004: Universitatea Craiova
- 2004–2005: PSV Eindhoven

Senior career*
Years	Team	Apps	(Gls)
2005–2008	Universitatea Craiova	55	(4)
2008–2011	Steaua București	16	(0)
2009–2011	Steaua II București	13	(0)
2010	→ Politehnica Iași (loan)	8	(0)
2011–2012	Royal Antwerp	28	(1)
2012–2014	Ferencváros	19	(1)
2012–2013	Ferencváros II	4	(0)
2014–2015	Naft Al-Janoob	22	(1)
2016	FC Eindhoven	5	(0)
2016	ASIL Lysi	12	(0)
2017	Voluntari	3	(0)
2017–2018	Aizawl FC	16	(3)
2018	Voluntari	0	(0)
2019–2021	Metaloglobus București	22	(1)
Total		213	(11)

International career
2005–2006	Romania U-19	6	(0)
2006–2010	Romania U-21	17	(1)
- * Club domestic league appearances and goals as of 07:53, 23 August 2021 (UTC)

Andrei Ionescu (born 29 March 1988) is a Romanian former professional footballer who played as an attacking midfielder.

== Club career ==
=== Universitatea Craiova ===
Ionescu was born in Craiova. He is a product of Universitatea Craiova's youth system and has been a regular player for them. Rising through the ranks, he became captain of the side on several occasions. His talent caught the attention of Dutch club PSV in 2004, where he spent one season in their academy. He made his professional Liga I debut on 27 August 2006 in a 0–4 loss to Dinamo București. In his three seasons at Craiova, he played 54 matches and scored 4 goals.

=== Steaua București ===
On 24 August 2008, he signed a five-year contract with Steaua București. He is in co-ownership with Universitatea Craiova. The following two seasons saw Ionescu in and out of the squad, making only 18 league and cup appearances during the two years, mostly from the substitutes bench. After the arrival of new manager Cristiano Bergodi, Ionescu became a regular starter for Steaua in the 2009–10 Europa League season. He made his European debut on 16 July 2009 against Hungarian side Újpest in a 2–0 win. Struggling for first team opportunities, Ionescu was sent out on loan to Politehnica Iaşi on 10 February 2010 until the summer. During the 2010 summer transfer window, he was close to sign a loan deal with Turkish side Mersin İdmanyurdu. However, the transfer failed. In the winter of 2010–11 season, Ionescu was demoted to the B squad.

In June 2011, Ionescu left Steaua.

=== Royal Antwerp ===
On 31 August 2011, the free agent signed a two-year contract with Belgian side Royal Antwerp.

=== Ferencváros Budapest ===
On 30 August 2012 he signed a contract with the Hungarian record champion Ferencváros Budapest.

=== Later years ===
In February 2016, 28-year-old Ionescu signed a four-month contract with Dutch Eerste Divisie club Eindhoven. In January 2017, he returned to Romania after six years by penning a deal with Voluntari.

=== Aizawl ===
Ionescu switched clubs and countries in August and signed for Indian I-League club Aizawl FC. He scored a goal in the 2018 AFC Champions League qualifying play-offs against Zob Ahan and became the first player to score a goal for Aizawl in any continental competitions. Ionescu's powerful right-footer from the centre of the box beat Zob Ahan goalkeeper Mohammad Mazaheri after he connected cross delivered by Laldinliana Renthlei.

== International career ==
Ionescu has played for Romania since the U-19 level and made his debut in September 2006 in a 4–2 win over Belgium. On 22 February 2006, he made his debut for the Romania U-21 squad in a friendly against Turkey.

== Honours ==
Steaua București

- Romanian Cup: 2010–11

Ferencváros

- Hungarian League Cup: 2012–13

Voluntari

- Romanian Cup: 2016–17
