= Paulo Menezes (football coach) =

Portuguese football manager (born 1978)

Personal information
- Full name: Paulo Menezes
- Date of birth: 24 March 1978 (age 48)
- Place of birth: Portugal

Managerial career
- Years: Team
- 2017–2018: Aizawl
- 2022–2024: Nejmeh
- 2024–2026: Madura United

Paulo Menezes (born 24 March 1978) is a Portuguese football manager.

== Playing career ==
Menezes started his playing career in 1996 and spent all of it playing in the Portuguese second and third divisions.
