= Aizawl FC =

Association football club in Mizoram, India

Aizawl
- Full name: Aizawl Football Club
- Nicknames: The People's Club; Red and Whites
- Short name: AFC
- Founded: June 14, 1984; 42 years ago
- Ground: Rajiv Gandhi Stadium
- Capacity: 20,000
- Owner: Lalthangliana Jongte
- Head coach: R. Lalruatfela
- League: Mizoram Premier League
| Home colours | Away colours | Third colours |

Aizawl Football Club is an Indian professional football club based in Aizawl, Mizoram. The club has most notably competed in the Indian Football League, the second tier of the Indian football league system. Founded in 1984, Aizawl earned entry in the I-League in the 2015–16 season, after winning the I-League 2nd Division.

Nicknamed "The People's Club", it became first club from the Northeast to win a top flight Indian football league. They participate in the Mizoram Premier League. Aizawl also went on to compete in continental stages, while the club appeared in 2017 edition of the AFC Cup. In august 2026, Aizawl finalized a "goodwill deal" approved by the All India Football Federation, transferring its license and sporting rights to Nagaland United for the 2026–27 Indian Football League season.

== History ==
Aizawl FC was founded in 1984 in Aizawl, the capital of Mizoram, and has since participated in various local tournaments. It is affiliated with the Mizoram Football Association (MFA) and is under the ownership of Robert Romawia Royte.

In January 2012, they were officially certified by the All India Football Federation (AIFF) to participate in the I-League 2nd Division, then second tier of football league system in the country. This move would begin a new chapter for Aizawl Football Club as they would officially become professional.

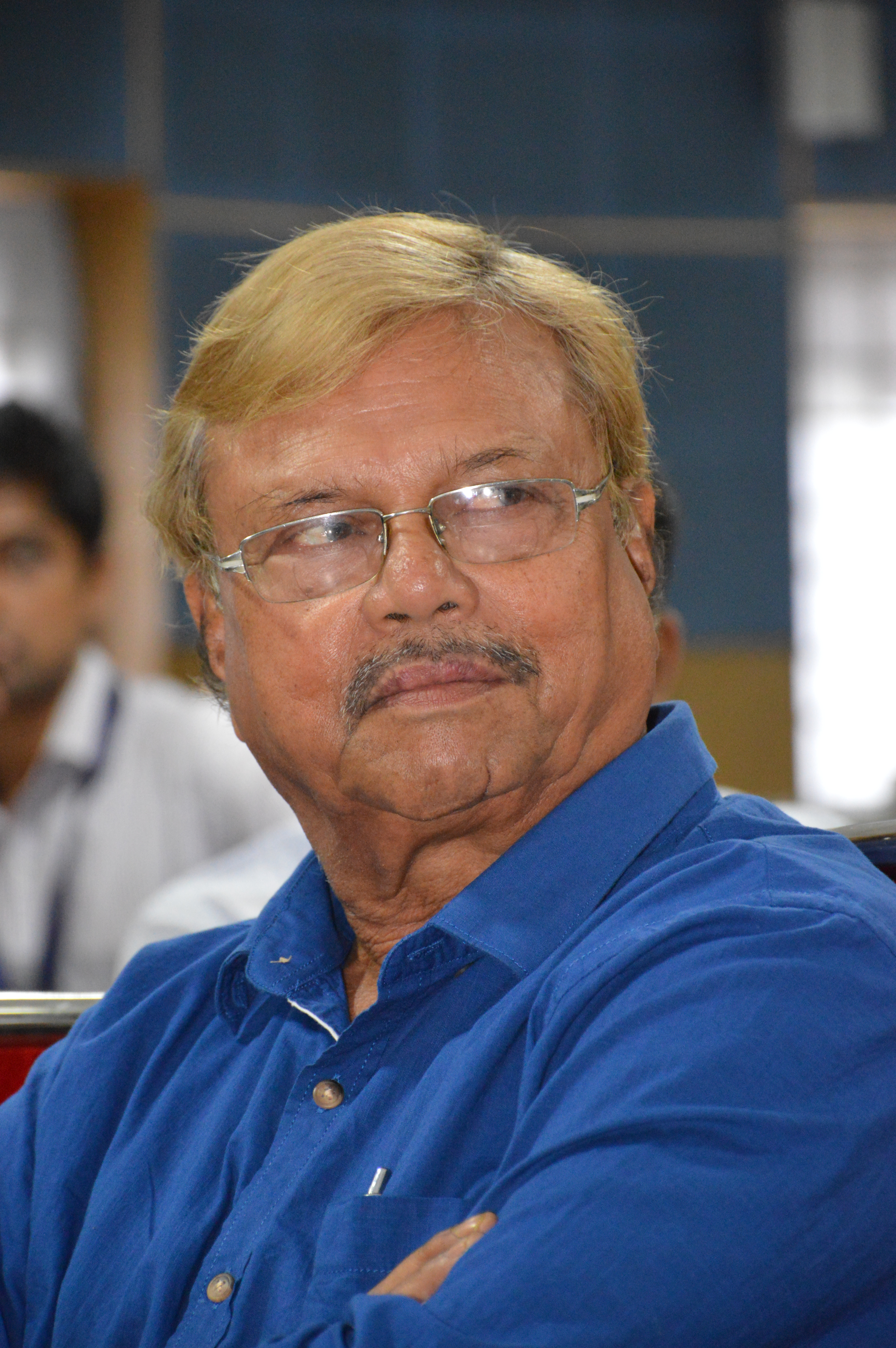
Jahar Das managed Aizawl in 2016, helped the team reaching Federation Cup final in that season.

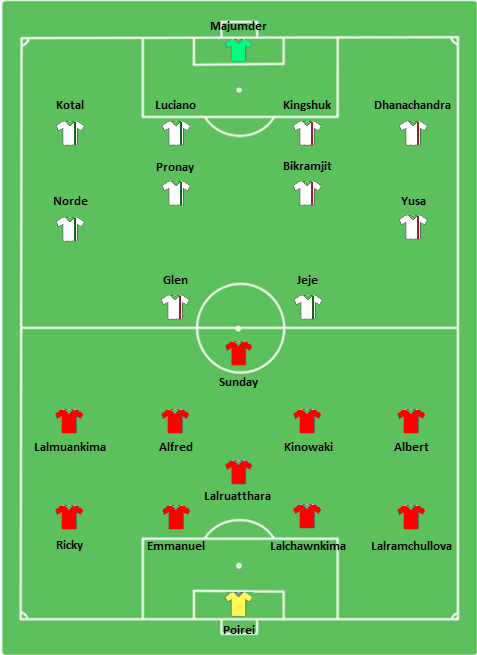
Aizawl (in red) and Mohun Bagan line-up at the 2015–16 Indian Federation Cup final

In September 2012, they participated in 2012 Indian Federation Cup qualifiers. Finally, the team qualified for I-League 2nd Division after its second attempt. In 2013, Aizawl reached the final of Bordoloi Trophy, but lost 1–0 to Bhawanipore. In 2015, they won the 2015 I-League 2nd Division, defeating Chanmari 4–2 in the final match. Thus they granted permission to participate in India's top-tier football tournament I-League in 2015–16 season, the first team from Mizoram to do so. Later Jahar Das was appointed head coach, and the club achieved runners-up position at the 2015–16 Indian Federation Cup.

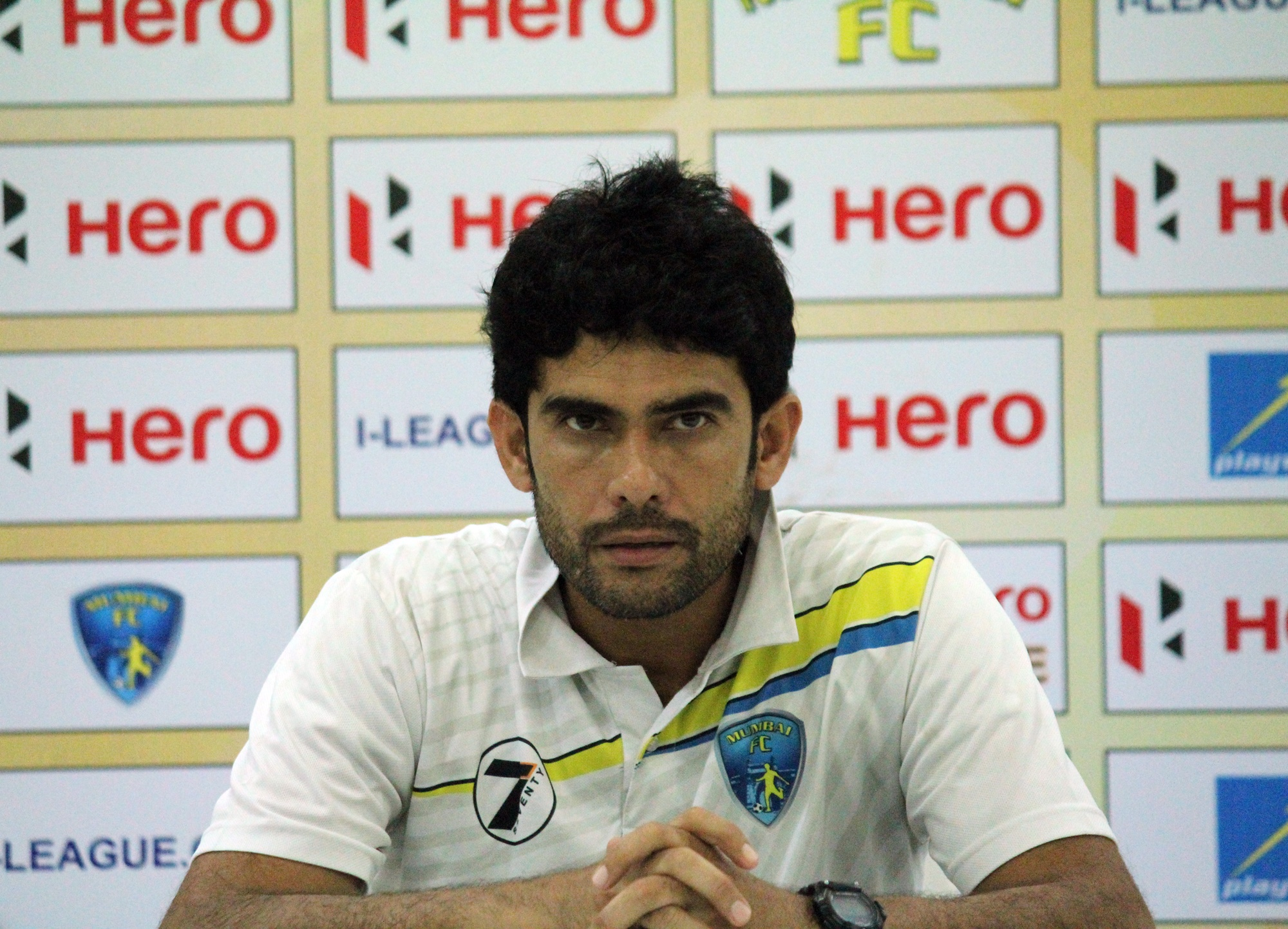
Khalid Jamil, Aizawl's 2016–17 I-League winning manager.

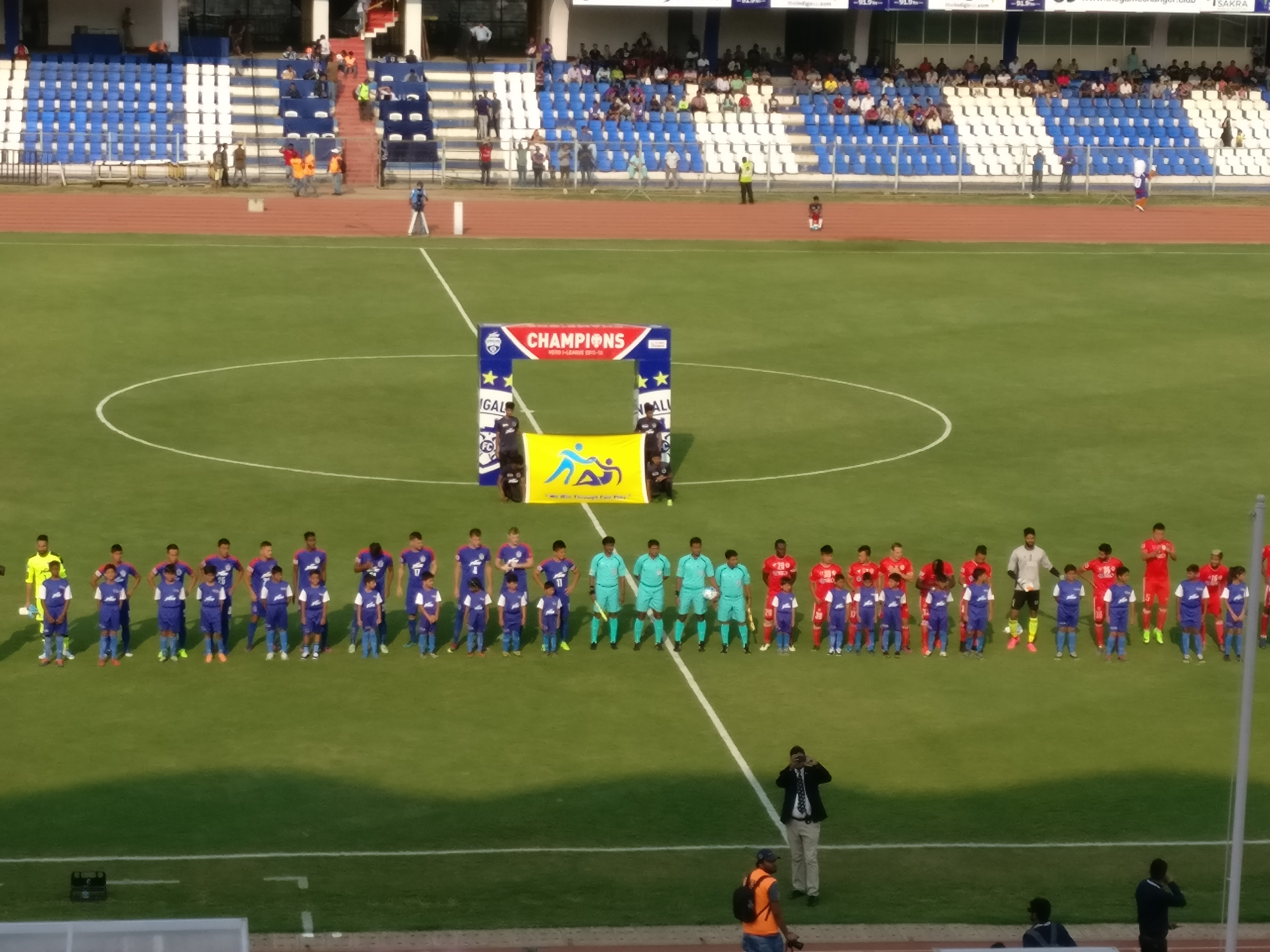
Aizawl players lining up (in red) during the 2016–17 Indian Federation Cup match against Bengaluru.

On 20 December 2016, Khalid Jamil was announced as the head coach of the first team for 2016–17 I-League. On 30 April 2017, Aizawl won the 2016–17 I-League, topping the league table with 37 points from 18 games. Aizawl became the first team from the north-east to win the top flight of Indian football. In the 2017–18 I-League season, Aizawl finished the league on the 5th position, garnering 24 points from 18 games. Aizawl has also participated in the 2018 Indian Super Cup and reached the quarter-finals. In January 2019, Aizawl announced Stanley Rozario as their new head coach, and ended their 2018–19 I-League season on the 7th spot on the table, with 24 points from 20 games. In the next season, Aizawl garnered 16 points from 15 games, with 5 games left in hand. On 18 April 2020, the All India Football Federation, the organising body of the league announced the cancellation of the remaining matches due to the COVID-19 pandemic.

The club [Aizawl FC] always wants to promote the players of the state of Mizoram and players from the academy, which is fantastic and which I also strongly believe in. They are the factory of Mizoram football. I am really blessed to be working with such a bunch of talented youngsters. It is a young squad and for them to be performing under this pressure, at this age, is a great experience that many people do not get. It's not easy for these youngsters to cope with but I think they've been doing a good job and I am really happy to be part of Aizawl FC.

— Head coach Yan Law, on Aizawl FC's impact in Indian football.

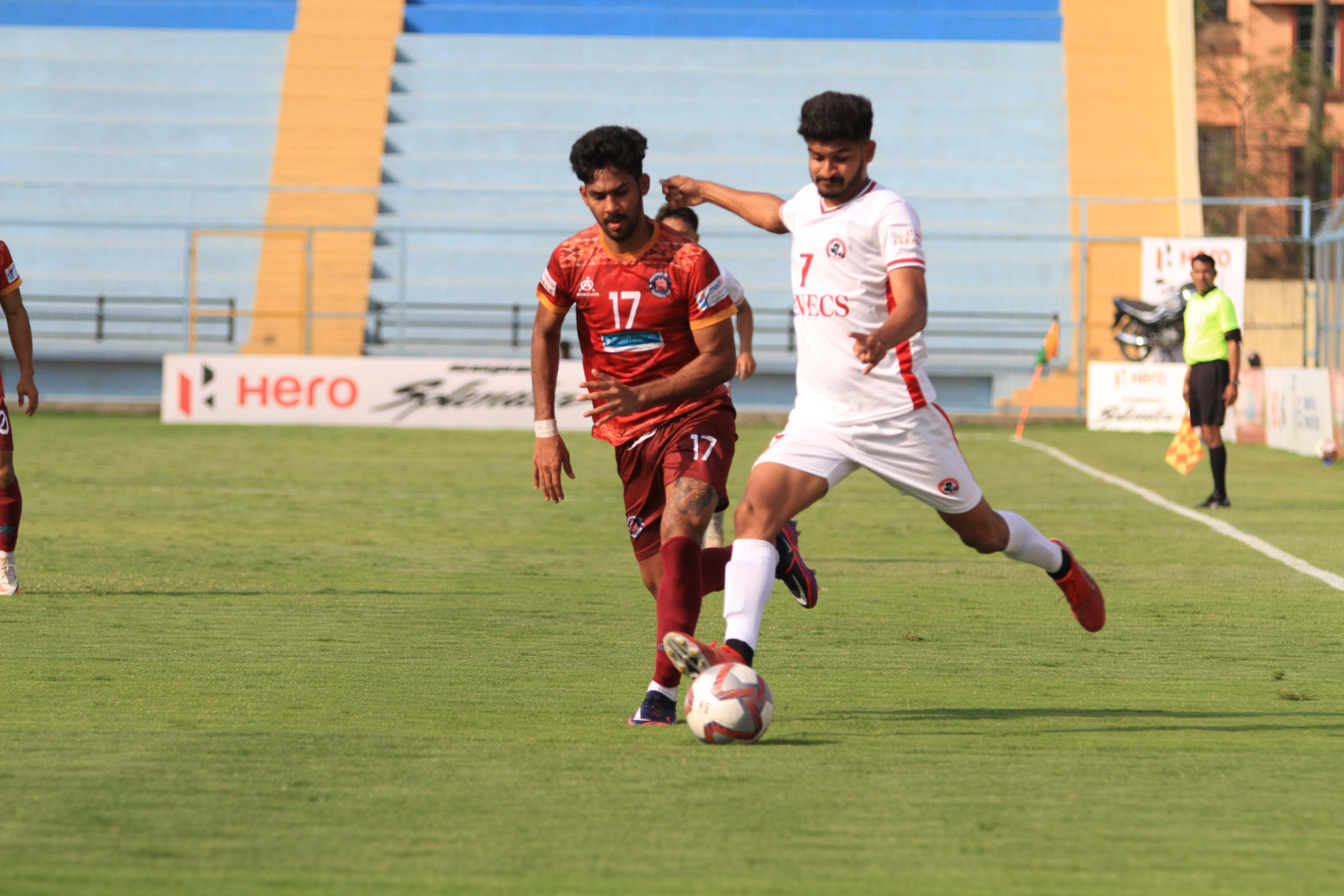
Aizawl player (in white), in action against Rajasthan United on a matchday of I-League, at the Kishore Bharati Krirangan in March 2022.

Due to COVID-19 pandemic, 2020–21 I-League season's format was shortened. All teams faced each other once in the first leg of the league. The league was then divided into two different groups. According to points table from first leg, top six teams faced each other once again in the Championship stage. The rest of the five teams played against each other in the Relegation stage. Aizawl ended the first phase of the season at the 7th position, with 15 points from 10 games. They couldn't qualify for the Championship stage, and hence were put in the Relegation stage, in which they topped the stage with 24 points from 14 games. For the 2021–22 I-League, Aizawl roped in Yan Law as their new head coach and finished the season on eighth place in league table.

In April 2023, the club earned qualification to 2023 Indian Super Cup after winning play-off matches. Aizawl began group stage campaign on 9 April, against Hyderabad, in which Belarusian Ivan Veras scored a goal in their 2–1 defeat. In 2023–24 I-League, Aizawl earned 25 points in 22 matches without playing the last two home games as NEROCA and TRAU refused to travel to Mizoram to face Aizawl (both the teams from Manipur were relegated to I-League 2). In that season, Lalrinzuala Lalbiaknia emerged as the highest Indian goalscorer of all time in a single season of I-League with 15 goals. On 5 April 2025, Aizawl pulled off the greatest escape on the last day of the 2024–25 I-League season, avoided elimination by winning 3–0 against Namdhari while Lalrinzuala Lalbiaknia again finished as top scorer for the club with 12 goals as the team gained 23 points.

== Crest, colours & kits ==
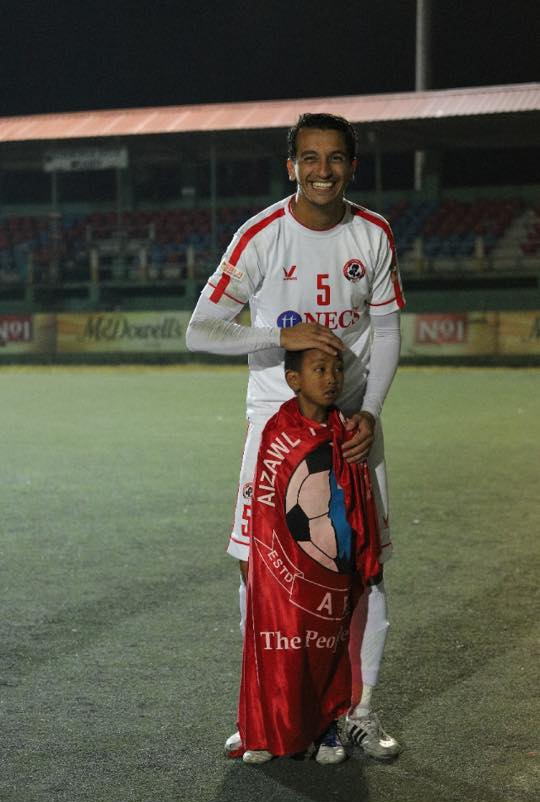
Aizawl's Afghan recruit Masih Saighani with a supporter at the Rajiv Gandhi Stadium in 2017

While the team colours are red and white, the official crest of Aizawl shows the Christian cross (Latin) atop of the map of Mizoram, on a football in the middle. The club is nicknamed "Red and Whites" because of its team colours.

== Kit manufacturers and shirt sponsors ==
| Period | Kit manufacturer | Shirt sponsor | Other sponsors |
|---|---|---|---|
| 2011—2015 | Rin Rin Sports | NorthEast Consultancy Services (NECS) | |
| 2015—2023 | Vamos | NorthEast Consultancy Services (NECS) | |
| 2023—present | Vamos | NECS, RRR, Trajon Infra | JSKI |

== Stadiums ==
=== Rajiv Gandhi Stadium ===
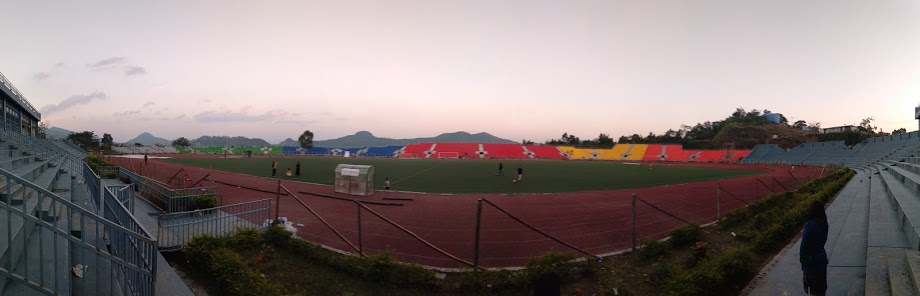
Rajiv Gandhi Stadium, the home ground of Aizawl

Aizawal FC plays its home matches at the Rajiv Gandhi Stadium, located in Salem Veng, Aizawl. It has artificial turf and a capacity of 20,000 spectators. It hosted the home games of Aizawl in both the I-League and Mizoram Premier League.

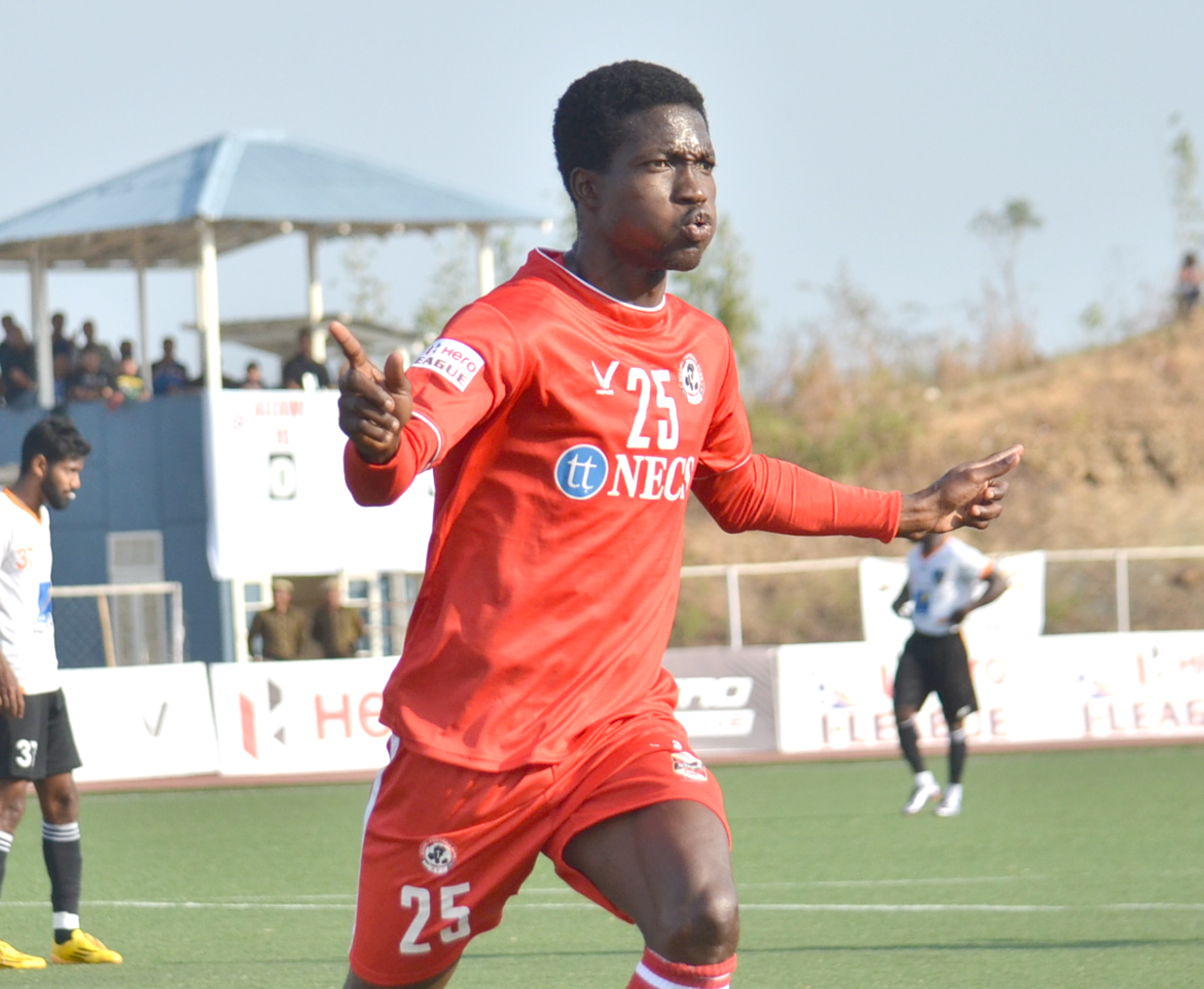
Joel Sunday after scoring a goal for Aizawl against Mumbai FC at the Rajiv Gandhi Stadium in 2016

=== Lammual AstroTurf Stadium ===
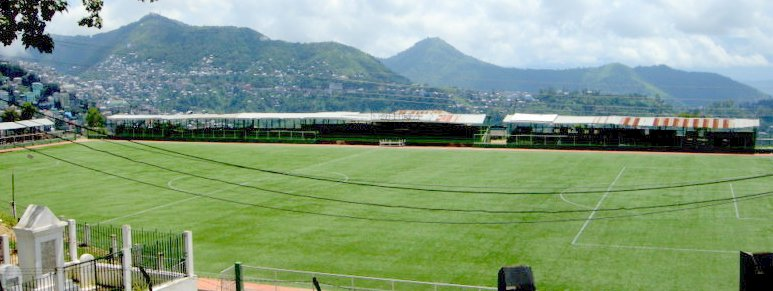
Lammual AstroTurf Stadium, former home ground of Aizawl

Until 2015, Aizawl FC used the Lammual AstroTurf Stadium as their home ground for matches of the Mizoram Premier League, which is a single tier stadium and has a seating capacity of 5,000 spectators.

== Support and rivalry ==
=== Supporters ===
The core of Aizawl support consists of the Red Army. They were among the first who brought the ultras movement in India. Large banners, flags and megaphones are their main characteristics. The Rajiv Gandhi Stadium has seen an average attendance of 20,000.

=== Rivalries ===
==== Northeast India Derby ====
Aizawl FC had rivalries with its fellow northeastern clubs including NEROCA, and TRAU FC. They also share rivalry with Shillong Lajong in domestic league, which is a part of the "Northeast Derby".

==== Mizoram Derby ====
In the regional championships including Mizoram Premier League and MFA Super Cup, the club also nurture rivalries with local sides Chhinga Veng FC, and Chanmari FC.

== Players (2026) ==
=== First-team squad ===
Note: Flags indicate national team as defined under FIFA eligibility rules; some limited exceptions apply. Players may hold more than one non-FIFA nationality.

| No. | Pos. | Nation | Player |
|---|---|---|---|
| 1 | GK | IND | Vanlal Hriatpuia |
| 37 | DF | IND | T. Lalmuanawma |
| 3 | DF | IND | Rohmingthanga |
| 8 | MF | IND | Lalawmpuia Sailo |
| 41 | MF | IND | Eric Remruatpuia Chhangte |
| 9 | FW | BRA | Higor Renato Lopes De Oliveira Gomes |
| 49 | GK | IND | Lalhruai Tluanga |
| 4 | DF | IND | C. Zomuanpuia |
| 15 | FW | IND | Malsawmzuala Tlangte |

| No. | Pos. | Nation | Player |
|---|---|---|---|
| 19 | DF | IND | H Lalrempuia |
| 14 | MF | IND | Laldawngzuala |
| 18 | FW | IND | Zomuansanga |
| 17 | DF | IND | Laldanmawia Hrangthankima |
| 7 | MF | IND | Laltlanzova |
| 47 | FW | IND | Vincent Lalduhawma |
| 31 | GK | IND | John Lalruatfela |
| 91 | MF | UZB | Timur Talipov |
| 27 | DF | COL | Luis Rodriguez Ayazo |
| 6 | MF | IND | Vanlalhriatzuala K. |
| 38 | FW | IND | Lalhriatpuia Lalrinfela |
| 10 | MF | IND | H. Lalruatfela |
| 11 | DF | IND | Felix Lalruatsanga |
| 16 | MF | IND | Isak Lalvenhima |
| 24 | DF | IND | Stephen Lalrinfela |
| 30 | MF | IND | JH Remlala |
| 33 | MF | IND | Vanlalawmpuia |

== Personnel ==
=== Current technical staff ===
As of April 20 2026

| Role | Name |
|---|---|
| Head coach | (India) R. Lalruatfela |
| Assistant coach | (India) Samuel Lalringheta Fanai |
| Media manager | (India) Joel Hmingthanga |
| Physiotherapist | (India) Vanlalhruaia |
| Team manager | (India) F. Lalrinmawia |
| Technical director | (India) Hmingthansanga |

== Records ==
=== Season-by-season ===
| Season | Division | Teams | Position | Attendance | Super Cup | Durand Cup | AFC Champions League | AFC Cup |
|---|---|---|---|---|---|---|---|---|
| 2012 | I-League 2nd Division | 23 | 7 | — | Qualifier | DNP | DNP | DNP |
| 2013 | I-League 2nd Division | 26 | Group stage | — | DNP | DNP | DNP | DNP |
| 2014 | I-League 2nd Division | 11 | Group stage | — | DNP | DNP | DNP | DNP |
| 2015 | I-League 2nd Division | 8 | 1 | — | DNP | DNP | DNP | DNP |
| 2015–16 | I-League | 9 | 8 | — | Runners-up | DNP | DNP | DNP |
| 2016–17 | I-League | 10 | 1 | 6,943 | Semi-final | Semi-final | DNP | DNP |
| 2017–18 | I-League | 10 | 5 | 4,256 | Quarter-finals | DNP | Play-off Round | Group stage |
| 2018–19 | I-League | 11 | 7 | 2,881 | DNP | DNP | DNP | DNP |
| 2019–20 | I-League | 11 | 10 | 5,203 | DNP | DNP | DNP | DNP |
| 2020–21 | I-League | 11 | 7 | — | DNP | DNP | DNP | DNP |
| 2021–22 | I-League | 13 | 8 | — | DNP | DNP | DNP | DNP |
| 2022–23 | I-League | 12 | 7 | 2333 | Group stage | DNP | DNP | DNP |
| 2023-24 | I-League | 13 | 9 | 1819 | DNP | DNP | DNP | DNP |
| 2024-25 | I-League | 12 | 6 | 5 | DNP | DNP | DNP | |

Key

- Attendance = Average league attendance
- DNP = Did Not Participated

=== Overall records ===
As of match played 3 March 2022

| Season | Division | | | | | | | Continental | | | | | | Top scorer | |
| Season | Division | P | W | D | L | GF | GA | P | W | D | L | GF | GA | Player | Goals |
|---|---|---|---|---|---|---|---|---|---|---|---|---|---|---|---|
| 2012 | I-League 2nd Division | 20 | 6 | 3 | 11 | 30 | 42 | Not qualified | | | | | | (India) Michael Lalremruata | 11 |
| 2013 | I-League 2nd Division | 8 | 4 | 1 | 3 | 15 | 13 | Not qualified | | | | | | (Nigeria) Justice Morgan | 6 |
| 2014 | I-League 2nd Division | 4 | 1 | 2 | 1 | 7 | 4 | Not qualified | | | | | | (India) Lalnuntluanga | 2 |
| 2015 | I-League 2nd Division | 14 | 11 | 1 | 2 | 45 | 20 | Not qualified | | | | | | (Liberia) Alfred Jaryan | 9 |
| 2015–16 | I-League | 16 | 4 | 4 | 8 | 15 | 21 | Not qualified | | | | | | (Nigeria) Joël Sunday | 8 |
| 2016–17 | I-League | 18 | 11 | 4 | 3 | 24 | 14 | Not qualified | | | | | | (Ivory Coast) Kamo Stephane Bayi | 7 |
| 2017–18 | I-League | 18 | 6 | 6 | 6 | 21 | 18 | 7 | 1 | 1 | 5 | 6 | 19 | (Romania) Andrei Ionescu | 12 |
| 2018–19 | I-League | 20 | 6 | 6 | 8 | 27 | 28 | Not qualified | | | | | | (Liberia) Ansumana Kromah | 9 |
| 2019–20 | I-League | 15 | 3 | 7 | 5 | 17 | 19 | Not qualified | | | | | | (India) Rochharzela | 6 |
| 2020–21 | I-League | 10 | 4 | 3 | 3 | 13 | 8 | Not qualified | | | | | | (India) R Malsawmtluanga (India) Lalremsanga Fanai (India) Brandon Vanlalremdika | 3 |
| 2021–22 | I-League | 17 | 7 | 0 | 10 | 23 | 26 | Not qualified | | | | | | (India) Lalthakima (India) Ramhlunchhunga | 1 |
| 2022–23 | I-League | 22 | 6 | 8 | 8 | 27 | 29 | Not qualified | | | | | | (Uganda) Henry Kisekka | 6 |
| 2023–24 | I-League | 24 | 6 | 9 | 9 | 36 | 35 | Not qualified | | | | | | (India) Lalrinzuala Lalbiaknia | 15 |
| 2024–25 | I-League | 22 | 6 | 5 | 11 | 35 | 46 | Not qualified | | | | | | (India) Lalrinzuala Lalbiaknia | 12 |

=== Continental statistics ===
As of match played 14 August 2018

| Competition | Pld | W | D | L | GF | GA | GD |
|---|---|---|---|---|---|---|---|
| AFC Champions League | 1 | 0 | 0 | 1 | 1 | 3 | −2 |
| AFC Cup | 6 | 1 | 1 | 4 | 5 | 16 | −11 |
| Total | 7 | 1 | 1 | 5 | 6 | 19 | –13 |

=== Individual records ===
- Highest Indian goalscorer in a single season of I-League: Lalrinzuala Lalbiaknia (while representing Aizawl FC) – 15 goals (2023–24 season).
- Top goalscorer in continental tournaments for the club: (Romania) Andrei Ionescu (3 goals in AFC Cup).
- Highest attendance at home in I-League: 11,000 vs Mohun Bagan (22 April 2017; 1–0 win).

== Managerial history ==
| Name | Nationality | From | To | P | W | D | L | GF | GA | Win% | Ref. |
|---|---|---|---|---|---|---|---|---|---|---|---|
| Hmingthana Zadeng | India | 1 July 2014 | 20 August 2015 | 14 | 11 | 1 | 2 | 45 | 20 | 78.57 | |
| Manuel Retamero Fraile | Spain | 17 August 2015 | 7 February 2016 | 6 | 1 | 1 | 4 | 6 | 6 | 16.67 | |
| Jahar Das | India | 7 February 2016 | 8 November 2016 | 15 | 5 | 5 | 5 | 22 | 31 | 33.33 | |
| Khalid Jamil | India | 20 December 2016 | 1 August 2017 | 22 | 13 | 5 | 4 | 29 | 18 | 59.09 | |
| Paulo Menezes | Portugal | 2 August 2017 | 12 February 2018 | 14 | 4 | 5 | 5 | 13 | 14 | 28.57 | |
| Santosh Kashyap | India | 13 February 2018 | 21 June 2018 | 5 | 2 | 1 | 2 | 9 | 7 | 40.00 | |
| Gift Raikhan | India | 22 June 2018 | 7 January 2019 | 11 | 2 | 3 | 6 | 12 | 18 | 18.18 | |
| Henry Rozario | India | 9 January 2019 | 18 January 2021 | 25 | 7 | 10 | 8 | 33 | 30 | 28.00 | |
| Yan Law | India | 19 January 2021 | 1 April 2021 | 13 | 7 | 3 | 3 | 20 | 12 | 53.85 | |
| Yan Law | India | 19 October 2021 | June 2022 | 17 | 7 | 0 | 10 | 23 | 26 | 41.18 | |
| Stanley Rozario | India | 24 August 2022 | 7 December 2022 | 5 | 1 | 2 | 2 | 5 | 6 | 20.00 | |
| Caetano Pinho | India | 9 December 2022 | Present | 15 | 2 | 5 | 8 | 15 | 29 | 13.33 | |
| Erol Akbay | Netherlands | 2 September 2023 | 4 November 2023 | 1 | 0 | 0 | 1 | 1 | 2 | 0.00 | |
| Bobi Stojkoski | North Macedonia | 23 January 2024 | May 2024 | 11 | 0 | 4 | 7 | 11 | 22 | 0.00 | |
| Victor Lalbiakmawia | India | 1 August 2024 | 18 February 2026 | 21 | 5 | 5 | 11 | 35 | 46 | 23.81 | |
| R. Lalruatfela | India | 27 February 2026 | Present | 10 | 3 | 3 | 4 | 13 | 22 | 30.00 | |

== Notable players ==
=== Past and present internationals ===
The players below have senior/youth international cap(s) for their respective countries. Players whose name is listed, represented their countries before or after playing for Aizawl FC.

==== Asia ====
- (Syria) Mahmoud Al Amnah (2017)
- (Afghanistan) Masih Saighani (2017–2018)
- (Kyrgyzstan) Bektur Talgat Uulu (2018)
- (Bhutan) Tshering Dorji (2018–2019)
- (Nepal) Abhishek Rijal (2021)
- (Tajikistan) Bakhtior Kalandarov (2022)

==== Africa ====
- Alfred Jaryan (2015–2016) (2017–2021) (2021–2022)-called up to the national squad of Liberia for the Africa Cup of Nations qualifiers, earned 96 league appearances with Aizawl and was voted best midfielder in India.
- (Ghana) Joseph Adjei (2019–2020)
- (Mali) Abdoulaye Kanouté (2019–2020)
- (Mali) Amadou Alou Sissoko (2019–2020)
- (Uganda) Richard Kasagga (2019–2021)
- (Uganda) Henry Kisekka (2022–2024)

==== Europe ====
- (Romania) Andrei Ionescu (2017–2018)
- (Serbia) Ivan Marić (2023–2024)
- (Poland) Rafał Zaborowski (2023–2024)

==== North America ====
- (Trinidad and Tobago) Willis Plaza (2021–2022)
- (Trinidad and Tobago) Robert Primus (2022)

==== South America ====
- (Paraguay) Enzo Prono Zelaya (2018)

== Honours ==
=== League ===
- I-League
  - Champions (1): 2016–17
- I-League 2nd Division
  - Champions (1): 2015
- Mizoram Premier League
  - Champions (5): 2014–15, 2015–16, 2018–19, 2019–20, 2024–25
  - Runners-up (1): 2017–18

=== Cup ===
- Federation Cup
  - Runners-up (1): 2015–16
- Bordoloi Trophy
  - Runners-up (1): 2013
- MFA Super Cup
  - Champions (1): 2016
  - Runners-up (1): 2015
- Mizoram Independence Day Cup
  - Champions (4): 1982, 1996, 2015, 2016
  - Runners-up (3): 2018, 2022, 2023

=== Award ===
- Indian Super Cup Fair Play Award: 2023

== Performance in AFC competitions ==
| Season | Competition | Round | Club | Home | Away | Position | Top scorer |
|---|---|---|---|---|---|---|---|
| 2018 | AFC Champions League | Preliminary round 2 | (Iran) Zob Ahan | 1–3 | | Preliminary Round | (Romania) Andrei Ionescu (3 goals) |
| 2018 | AFC Cup | Group E | (Maldives) New Radiant | 2–1 | 3–1 | Fourth in Group E | (Romania) Andrei Ionescu (3 goals) |
| 2018 | AFC Cup | Group E | (India) Bengaluru | 1–3 | 5–0 | Fourth in Group E | (Romania) Andrei Ionescu (3 goals) |
| 2018 | AFC Cup | Group E | (Bangladesh) Abahani Limited Dhaka | 0–3 | 1–1 | Fourth in Group E | (Romania) Andrei Ionescu (3 goals) |

== Other departments ==
=== Aizawl youth & academy ===
U15 youth men's team of Aizawl took part in Nike Premier Cup. Club's U18 team competed, and later moved to final round of 2018–19 Indian Elite League.

=== Aizawl women ===
The women's football section of Aizawl FC was instituted for the first time in 2016 and qualified directly in the 2016–17 Indian Women's League main round. They finished fifth in the group stage.

== See also ==
- List of football clubs in Mizoram
