= Blue Pilgrims =

Organised football fan group supporting India national teams

- Founded: 2017; 9 years ago
- Type: Supporters' group
- Teams: Men: India Senior, U23, U20, U17; Women: India Senior, U19, U17
- Motto: Inquilab-e-Indian football (Revolution of Indian football)
- Location: India
- Arena: Multiple
- Colors: Blue & Indian tricolour

Blue Pilgrims is an organised group of football fans who support the India national football men's team, women's team, and all the other age–group national teams at almost every home and away game. Founded in 2017 before the commencement of the 2017 FIFA U-17 World Cup, which was held in India, the group based their name on the nickname of the national team, the "Blue Tigers". They consider travelling with the national teams to wherever the teams play as their pilgrimage. They often display flags, banners, and tifos in support of the national team.

== History ==
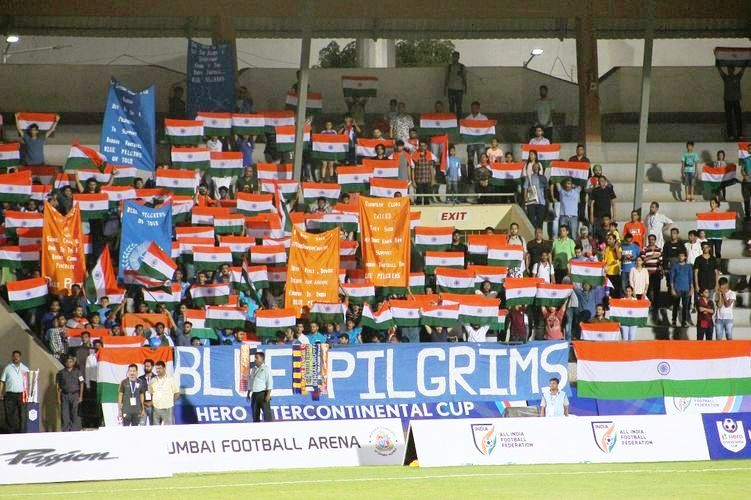
Blue Pilgrims displaying tri-colour national flag and their own banners at the 2018 Intercontinental Cup

Until the 2000s, India football fans were mostly scattered, being widely based in West Bengal, North-East India, Goa, and Kerala. Other than matches at the Asian Games, Nehru Cup, or SAFF Championship, fans showed up in small numbers when the team played, and fans of different clubs used to support the team in their respective local venues. In 2017, the Blue Pilgrims were established as the first organised fan club for the national team.

The Blue Pilgrims were formed with a motive to support the national team and the U-17 team during the historic 2017 U17 World Cup, India's first-ever FIFA competition participation. Begun with some 300 fans, the group grew to encompass thousands, with fans from different regions and with different allegiances coming together to support the Blue Tigers. They call themselves the devotees of the Blue Tigers, and their objective is to support India national football teams of all genders and ages, wherever they play. For their dedication, they have been called the "12th man" of the team.

== Chants, slogans, and banners ==
The Blue Pilgrims's most common chants are: "Oh India!", (Note: Oh India :- Shaa lalalalalala, Oh India!; Shaa lalalalalala, Oh India !) "In Unity we stand", (Note: In Unity we stand :- In Unity we stand, every woman and man !; In Unity we stand, every club and fan ! In the land we born, we rise as one, we rise one !; One for all, all for one, stand strong, standing strong ! Do you feel like we do? For every player wearing blue; Our love for India, deep & true, deep & true !!) "Oh India we stand for you!", (Note: Oh India we stand :- Oh India we stand for you !; Oh India we sing for you!; lalalala ! Bengali version: India tumi agiye chalo !; Oh India tumi agiye chalo !; Aamra..thakbo..tomari..saathe.., aamra thakbo sobari sange !; Oh India tumi agiye chalo !!) and "Vande Mataram". Their sports anthems are "Oh when the blues go marching in, I wanna be in that number!" (sung to the tune of "When the Saints Go Marching In"), and "Hum honge kaamyab" (We Shall Overcome). Since their formation, the Blue Pilgrims celebrate after every match with the Viking clap together with national team members.

Fans of the India national football team display the country's tricolour national flag and also wear blue jerseys in solidarity with the team. They use to display banners inscribed with Blue Pilgrims along with their motto "Inquilab-e-Indian football" (Revolution of Indian football), a catchphrase which signifies their ongoing effort and struggle as a movement for supporting the national team. They often shouted their common slogan, "We love you, wherever you go, we follow!". (Note: Slogan :- We love you; Wherever you go, we follow ! And peace upon India; And that's the way we like it !)

== Notable events ==
=== Response to captain's call ===
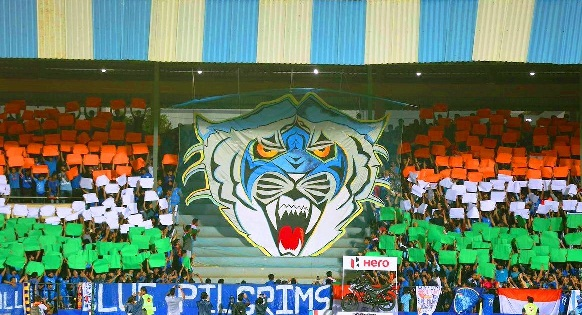
The 3D Blue Tiger tifo displayed by Blue Pilgrims in June 2018

On 2 June 2018, then-team captain Sunil Chhetri posted a video on social media urging the fans to come out at Mumbai, Maharashtra to support the team after a poor crowd appearance of only 2,569 at a match against Chinese Taipei in the 2018 Intercontinental Cup. India achieved a significant victory in that match, winning by 5–0 with Chhetri scoring a hat-trick, but few fans were present to celebrate. Responding to the captain's call, the Blue Pilgrims and football supporters made sure that the stadiums were full during the next few matches. In the final of that tournament, the Blue Pilgrims displayed a 30 ft (9.1 m) tall 3D tifo of a Blue Tiger, the first ever in the team's history.

=== Protest against AIFF and FSDL ===
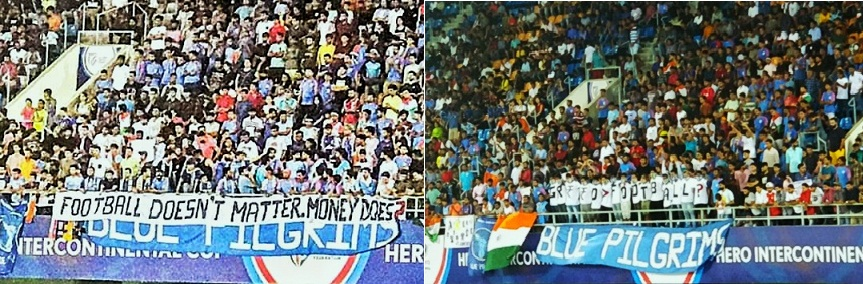
Blue Pilgrims's protest against AIFF and FSDL

During the 2019 Intercontinental Cup on 13 July, the Blue Pilgrims unveiled a banner inscribed "Football Doesn't Matter, Money Does?" before India's match against North Korea at the TransStadia Arena in Ahmedabad, Gujarat. Their protest was against the All India Football Federation (AIFF) and the Football Sports Development (FSDL) due to their failure to resolve the issues related to the two simultaneous top-tier leagues in Indian football; the Indian Super League (ISL) and the I-League. The protest was mainly due to the unfair treatment of I-league clubs with respect to media, visibility and coverage, and further to highlight the then circumstances of Indian football where multiple clubs were shutting down or at the juncture to shut down. The AIFF's plan was also to give the premier league position in the country to the ISL, played by newly formed clubs in India, ahead of the popular I-League, which is played by long-established football clubs of India. This decision would give the ISL winner the AFC Champions League's preliminary round allocated berth, and also the AFC Cup's group stage allocated berth, which were previously given to I-League winners for being the top league of the country. When match organisers at the stadium asked the fans to refrain from displaying these banners, they wore shirts instead which displayed the words "GREED > FOOTBALL?" to protest against the FSDL.

=== Homage to Talimeren Ao ===
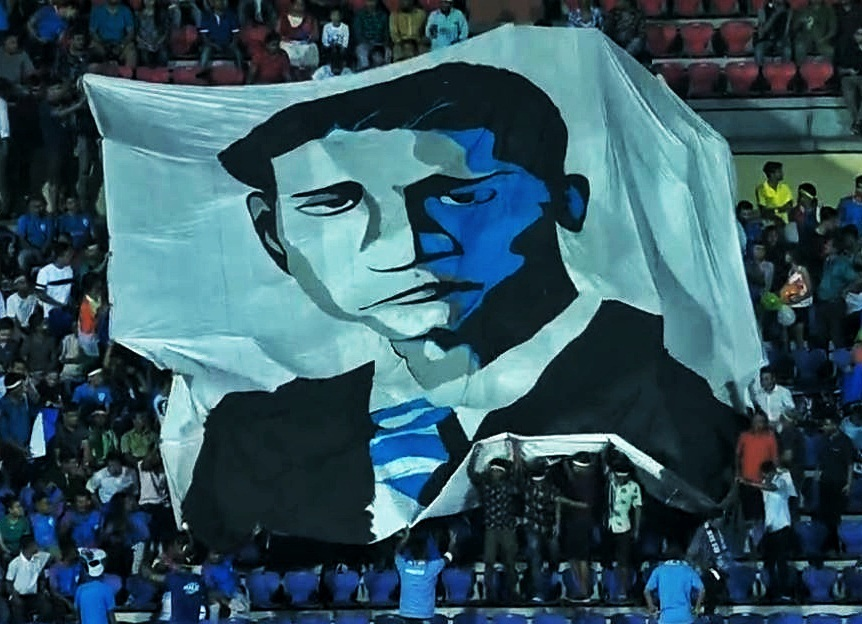
Tifo of Talimeren Ao, unveiled by Blue Pilgrims in Guwahati, 2019

On 5 September 2019, the Blue Pilgrims in collaboration with the Highlander Brigade, displayed a huge tifo of the former India national football team captain Talimeren Ao during the 2022 World Cup qualifying match against Oman. With that they unveiled their banner "The Revolutionary", and also displayed a mosaic forming the words "AO 1" with the help of a card stunt to pay homage to the legendary captain. Ao had led India at the 1948 Olympics in the match against France, the first match India played after Independence. Ao hailed from Nagaland (then a part of Assam), a state in the northeastern region of India, and because the anniversary of his death was in September and to encourage the ardour of the people of that part of the country towards football, the Blue Pilgrims decided to unfurl the tifo at Indira Gandhi Athletic Stadium, located in Guwahati, Assam.

=== Uniting Kolkata Derby fans ===
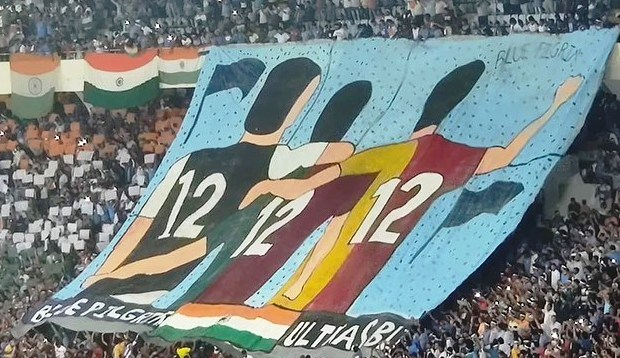
Tifo displaying fans of Mohammedan, Mohun Bagan, and East Bengal united as the "12th man" of the national team.

For India's 2022 FIFA World Cup qualification home leg match against Bangladesh at Salt Lake Stadium in Kolkata, West Bengal on 15 October 2019, the coach and players of the national team expressed their desire to see a "full house" of fans, as often witnessed during Kolkata Derbies. The Blue Pilgrims decided to create a tifo depicting a united group of Mohammedan (in black and white), Mohan Bagan (in green and maroon), and East Bengal (in yellow and red) fans as the "12th man" for the national team. The creation of the tifo was a collaborative work among all groups of fans, as Mohun Bagan fans painted the East Bengal jersey and East Bengal fans painted the Mohun Bagan jersey; both sets painted the Mohammedan jersey. Funding for the creation of the tifo was raised through crowdfunding; the Blue Pilgrims exceeded their goal of ₹60,000 (US$620), raising a total of ₹87,507 (US$910) from 274 donors. Approximately 54,000 fans attended the match, one of the highest matches of the national team where the tifo was displayed. The match ended in a draw between India and Bangladesh.

== See also ==
- East Bengal Ultras
- East Bengal the Real Power
- Manjappada
