= East Bengal Ultras =

Supporters group of Sporting Club East Bengal

- Nickname: Bangal Brigade
- Abbreviation: EBU
- Established: 2013; 13 years ago
- Type: Supporters' group, Ultras group
- Club: East Bengal
- Location: Kolkata, West Bengal
- Stadium: East Bengal Ground; Salt Lake Stadium; Kalyani Stadium; Barasat Stadium; Kanchenjunga Stadium
- Stand: Usually C2 Left (ISL 2023–24 home games except Kolkata Derby)
- Colours: Red and Gold
- Website: ebultras.com

The East Bengal Ultras (Bengali pronunciation: [ˈi:st ˌbenˈɡɔːl ˈʌltrəz]) is the vocal supporters' group of an Indian football club, East Bengal, which competes in the ISL—the top-tier football league in India. The group is also often referred to as the Bangal Brigade since much of its fanbase originates from the eastern region of Bengal. Founded in 2013, it was the first ultras group in Indian football and has been credited with revolutionising the fan movement. East Bengal Ultras was the first supporters' group in India to organise an on-field pyrotechnics show and the first in South Asia to organise a live chant show, which was named Tunes of Colony, in 2019. The group has around 25 chants and slogans.

East Bengal Ultras is known for making some of the largest unique tifos and banners in Indian football. In the 2019–20 I-League season, it set a record for the biggest tifo—10,000 sq ft (930 m^{2})—in Indian football history at that time, breaking the previous record of 7,200 sq ft (670 m^{2}) which the group had also set.

== East Bengal ==
East Bengal Club was founded in 1920 and is regarded as one of India's oldest and most successful association football clubs. The team has won multiple national and international trophies in its history. In 1930, Mahatma Gandhi's Satyagraha (or nonviolent resistance) swept over India and affected football; Indian clubs boycotted the ongoing Calcutta Football League (CFL) midway through the season. In the midst of the disruption, Royal Regiment was declared First Division winner, but East Bengal was not promoted to the First Division despite having won the Second Division. Thousands of East Bengal fans and officials held a protest march at the East Bengal Ground, where protesters carried flaming torches. A hand holding a flaming torch became the supporters' club's emblem. This icon is still the emblem of the club.

== Initial years: 2013–2016 ==
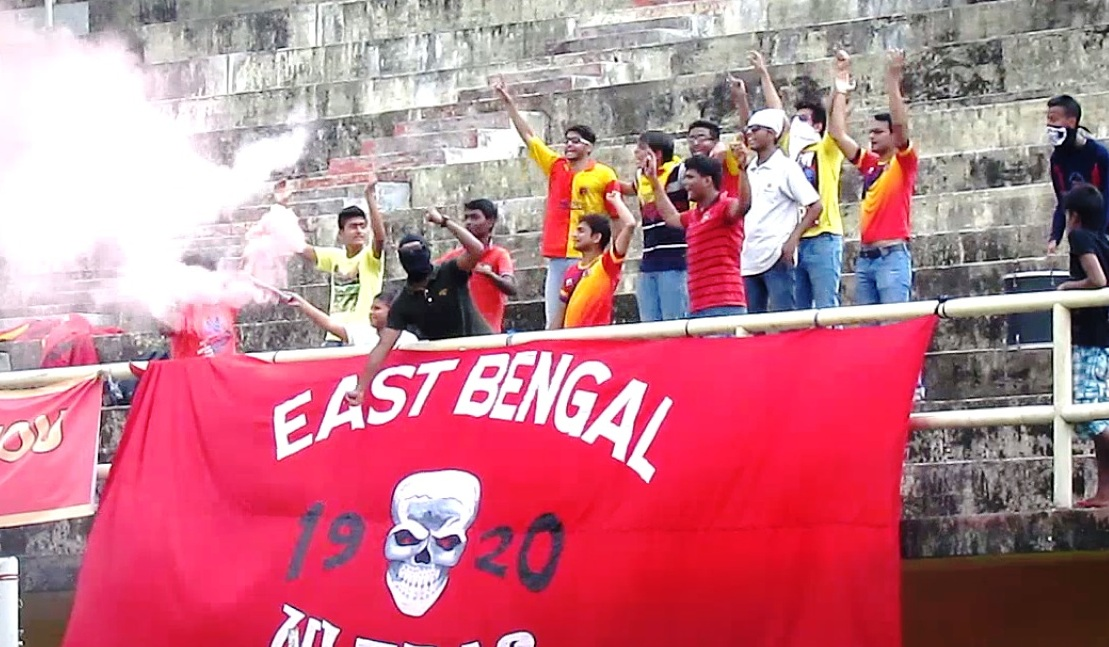
East Bengal Ultras in 2013

In 2013, the East Bengal Ultras made its first appearance at an away game against Bengaluru, becoming the first ultras group in the country. The group introduced smoke shows at the 2015 Calcutta Football League Kolkata Derby, which East Bengal won by 4–0 and unveiled its first large tifo at the 2016 Kolkata Derby at the Salt Lake Stadium in Bidhannagar. The tifo was a large East Bengal jersey that had the number 12 printed on the back, denoting that the fans were the club's "twelfth man". The tifo was the first of its kind in Indian football and became very popular with the club's supporters.

In the 2015–16 I-League, the East Bengal Ultras presented colourful mosaic shows at matches against Bengaluru and Salgaocar in the Barasat Stadium. These were firsts in India's fan culture. At the opening match of the 2016 CFL Premier Division at the Kalyani Stadium, the East Bengal Ultras displayed a 3D tifo, first ever in South Asia, that depicted an East Bengal player holding the CFL Trophy against the backdrop of the Kolkata skyline and the text Kolkata Amader ("Kolkata is ours").

== Growth of ultras culture: 2017–present ==
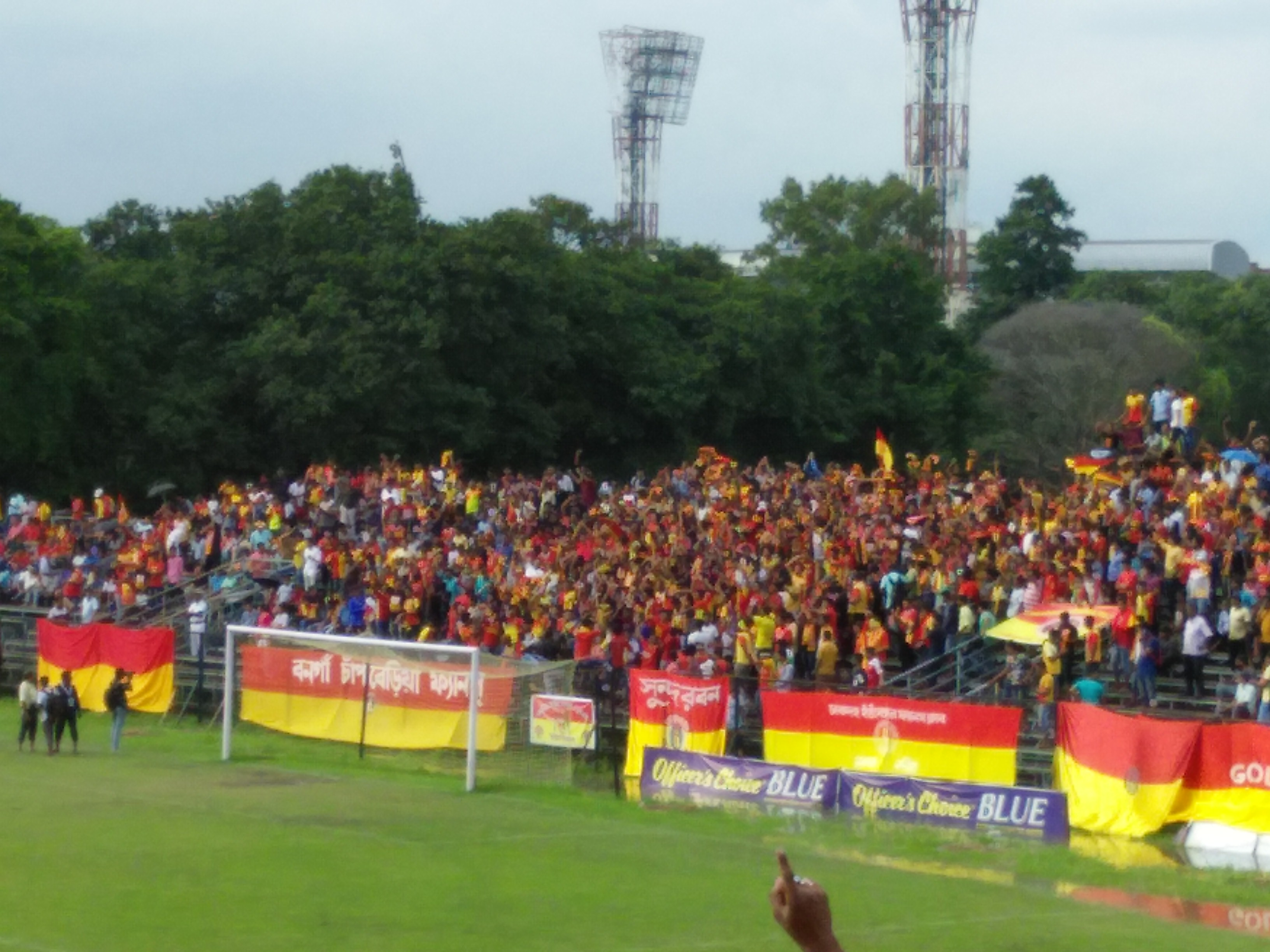
Viking Clap in East Bengal Ground

The East Bengal Ultras introduced pole flags and a scarf show at a 2016–17 I-League match against Aizawl. The first big tifo of 2017 was another 3D tifo against Bengaluru. The new atmosphere in Indian football created by the group attracted coverage by foreign sports media like Copa90, Ultras-tifo, Football Fans Asia, 11 Freunde, Medium, Exhale Sports and ultras groups of various football clubs. East Bengal Ultras have also backed the club's youth team, performing activities at youth derbies, which prompted much discussion on fan forums. The group started with around 10 people, but they had expanded to thousands by 2019, including between 100 and 150 core members. They are considered as the second best ultras group in Asia.

=== Pyro show ===
At an 18 August 2018 CFL game played between East Bengal and Aryan, scores of pyrotechnics were lit at the end of the game. Chants and pyro displays caught the attention of rival fans and players. A powerful procession to the venue was accompanied by a smoke show at the start of the game and it was the first and largest pyro show in Indian football.

=== Tunes of Colony ===
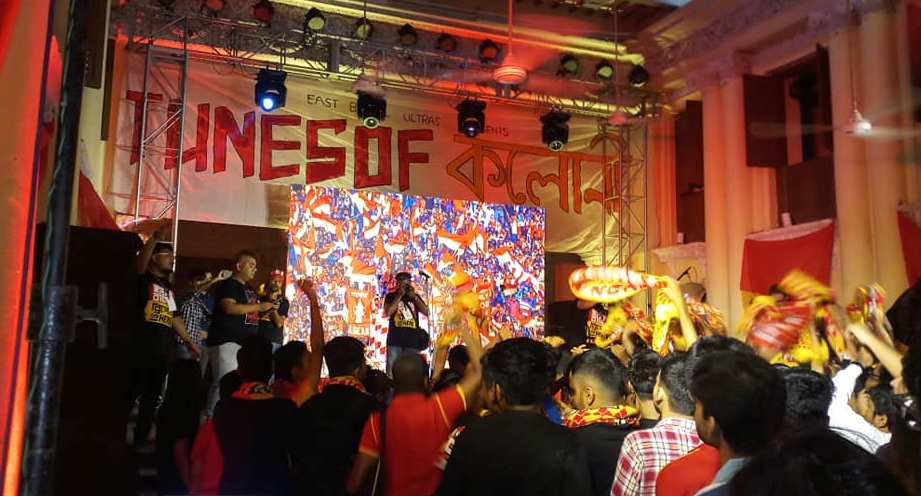
Tunes of Colony by East Bengal Ultras

To celebrate the club's centenary, the Ultras organised an event called Tunes of Colony, which was held on 31 July 2019 at the Sovabazar Natmandir temple. It was the first-ever chant-based musical show in Indian and South Asian football. The event was a hit with East Bengal fans.

=== Tifos ===
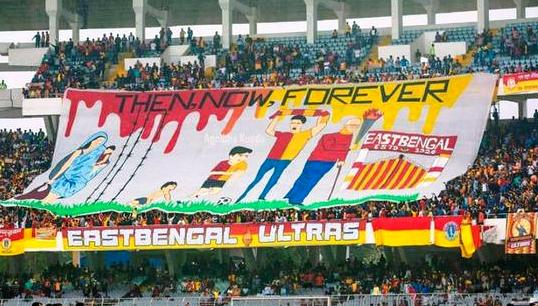
"Then, Now, Forever" tifo

In the 2018–19 season, East Bengal won both Kolkata Derbies in the I-League. On 16 December 2018 at the Home Derby, East Bengal Ultras unfurled a gigantic tifo referencing the fan taunt Aha bujhlen kotta, aar koite hoibo? ("Do you understand sir? Do I need to say more?") with images of tea, sugar and milk. This tifo was covered by the BBC.

On 27 January 2019 at the return derby, the East Bengal Ultras displayed the second-largest tifo in Indian football. This was covered by sports media like Ultras-tifo. The banner was around 7,200 sq ft (670 m^{2}) and depicted the struggles their ancestors faced during the Partition of India, showing how the East Bengal Club became an inspiration for their daily lives. The fans also put on a smoke show before the match.

East Bengal Ultras unveiled a large banner at the 2022 FIFA World Cup Qualification match against Bangladesh. It portrayed the front page of The Times of India after India won the 2011 Cricket World Cup and displayed the message "Dream Comes True!". The group supported the Indian team with continuous chanting and viking thunder claps, which continued after the match finished in a draw.

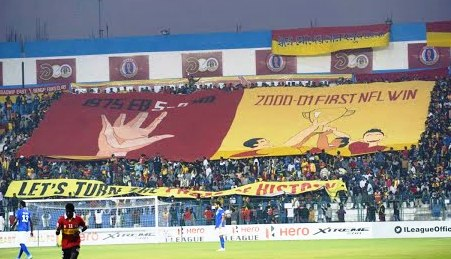
History book tifo

At a game against Real Kashmir on 4 December 2019, the first game of their 2019–20 I-League campaign at the Kalyani Stadium, the East Bengal Ultras presented a 10,000 sq ft (930 m^{2}) tifo, the largest in Indian football at that time, showing five major achievements in the history of East Bengal in the form of a book. This tifo was featured in a December 2019 article in the United States-based media outlet The18. The record was later broken by Manjappada, the supporters' of Kerala Blasters FC on 11 December 2022 by presenting a 11000 sq ft tifo.

== NRC controversy ==
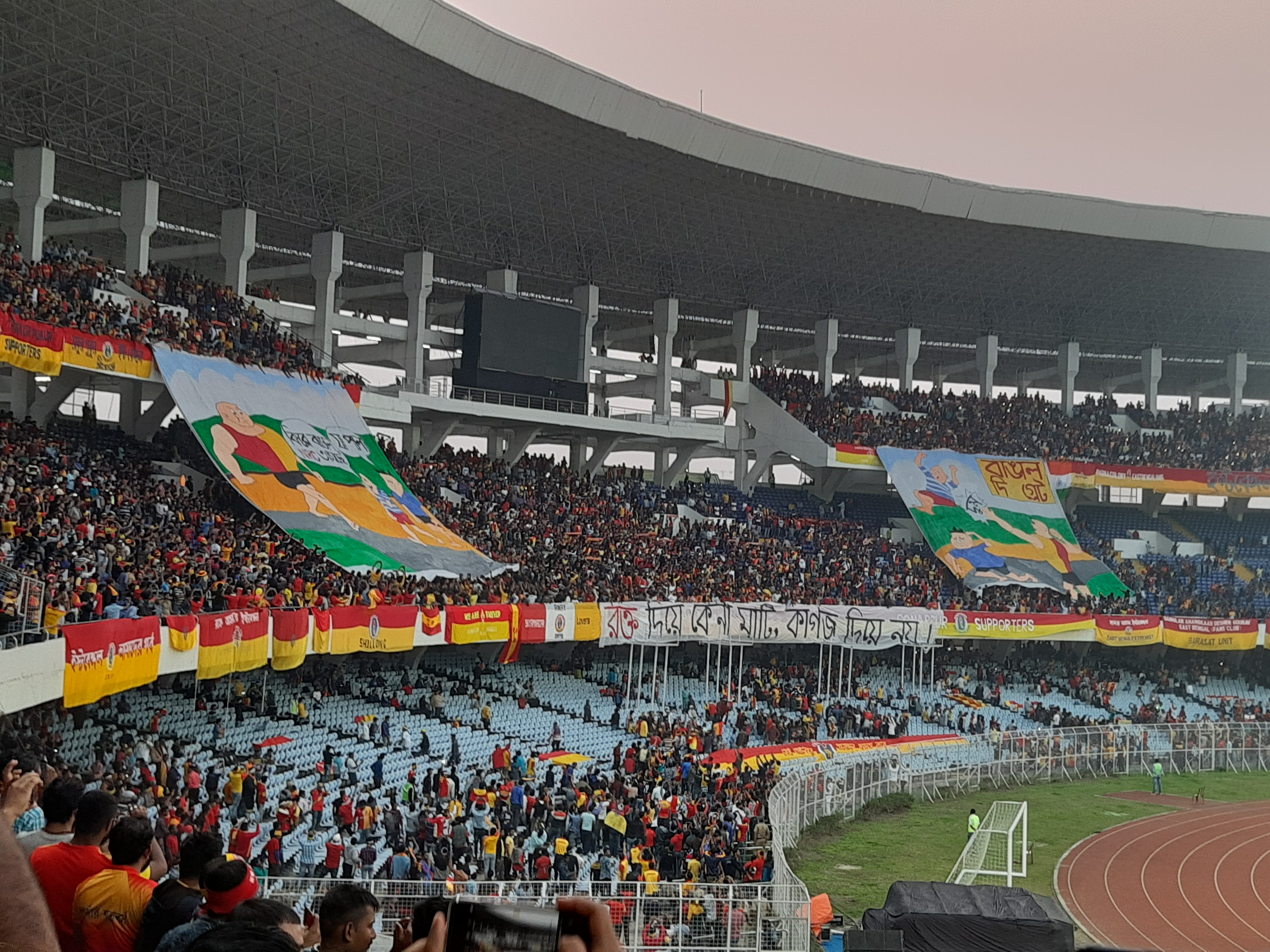
Tifo on display with slogans on NRC during Kolkata Derby

In January 2020, East Bengal Ultras caused a controversy when during the 2019–20 I-League first leg Kolkata Derby match, its members unfurled a tifo bearing statements against the National Register of Citizens (NRC). The banner bore text in Bengali that said, Rokto Diye Kena Maati, Kaagoj Diye Noy ("We bought the land with our blood, not with papers"). The group said in an official statement that the tifo was apolitical and an answer to racist jibes and cyberbullying from rival fans. The incident led to controversy between groups both for and against the NRC.

== Chants and slogans ==
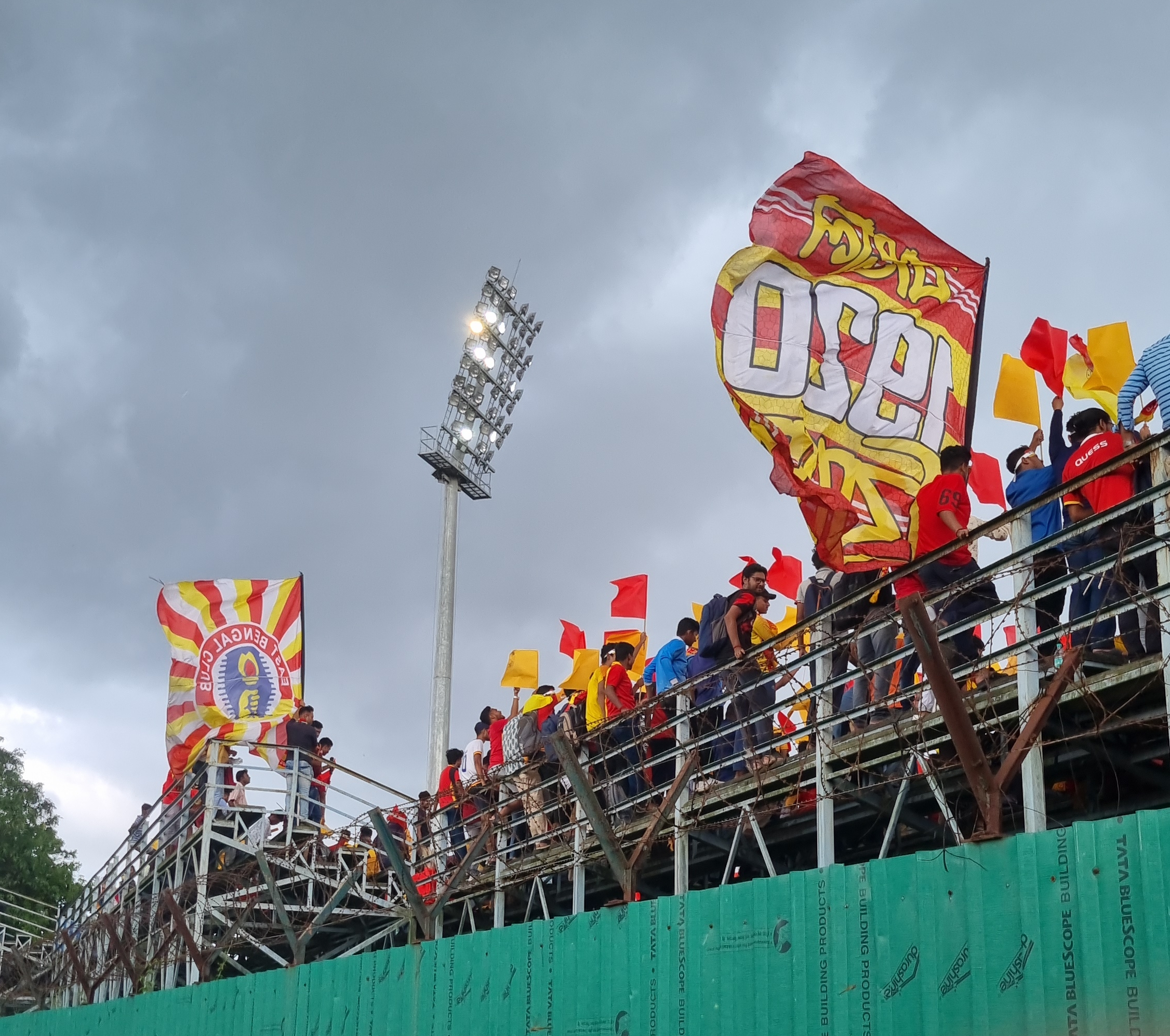
East Bengal ultras brigade during a CFL Premier Division match in Kolkata, in July 2023.

লড়েছি অনেক যুদ্ধ, মিলিয়ে কাঁধে কাঁধ
জাকার্তা থেকে জম্মু,করেছি বাজিমাৎ
দুচোখে ভরা স্বপ্ন,বুকেতে দাবানল
লড়াইয়ের রূপকথা, ও আমার ইস্টবেঙ্গল
(In English: We fought many battles, shoulder to shoulder, from Jakarta to Jammu, we did checkmate. Eyes filled with dreams, bursting in my heart, fairytale of battle, O my East Bengal)

— Adopted from "Un giorno all'improvviso"

The East Bengal Ultras has been very vocal since its inception and brought football chanting to Indian football to counter traditionally abusive Kolkata football supporters and create a more positive atmosphere and a sense of belonging at games. One of the first East Bengal Ultras chants was Amra Korbo Sringojoy and Haat e Moshal, Buk e Barood; Amra Holam, Lal Holud ("We will do it and torch in hand, gunpowder in the heart, we are red and gold respectively"); since then, a number of chants and slogans based on the club's fortunes have been adopted, modified and re-structured. As of 2020, there are around two dozen chants and slogans. The East Bengal Ultras construct new tunes and chants every year, adapting tunes from Ultras in Europe and South America. "Dale Cavese" is one of the most famous tunes that became popular with the East Bengal Ultras. "Allez Allez Allez" sung by Liverpool F.C. fans, which was itself adapted from Un giorno all'improvviso (originally "L'estate sta finendo") sung by the S.S.C. Napoli fans, was adopted into Bengali and became popular among the supporters.

== Kalinga Super Cup 2024: The Ultras Way ==
The 2024 Kalinga Super Cup won their first major title after 12 years.

== See also ==
- East Bengal the Real Power
