= East Bengal FC =

Association football club in India

Coordinates: 22°33′34.06″N 88°20′35.65″E

- Full name: East Bengal Football Club
- Nicknames: Lal Holud Brigade (The Red and Yellow Brigade); Moshal Bahini (The Torch Bearers); Bangal Brigade
- Short name: EBFC
- Founded: 1 August 1920; 106 years ago
- Stadium: East Bengal Ground
- Capacity: 23,500
- Owner: East Bengal FC Pvt Ltd
- President: Murari Lal Lohia
- Head coach: Antonio López Habas
- League: Indian Super League
- 2025–26: Indian Super League, 1st of 14 (champions)
- Website: eastbengalclub.com
Home colours	Away colours

East Bengal Football Club, commonly referred to as East Bengal, is an Indian professional football club based in Kolkata, West Bengal. The club competes in the Indian Super League, the top flight of the Indian football league system. They are the second most successful club in India, having won Four National League titles, in addition to a record forty-one state league titles. The club has enjoyed significant success in domestic cup competitions including the Federation Cup/Super Cup trophies, making it one of the most decorated football clubs in India.

It is one of the three biggest clubs of Kolkata, and participates in the well-renowned Kolkata derby against its long time rivals Mohun Bagan. The club also plays in the mini Kolkata derby with Mohammedan. Founded in August 1920, the club became affiliated with the Indian Football Association in 1922 and initially played in the Calcutta Football League Second Division, before earning promotion to the First Division in 1924. East Bengal won its maiden First Division league title in 1942. The club was a founding member of the National Football League, the first nation-wide football league in 1996, which it has won 3 times. The club has also won several other trophies, including the Durand Cup 17 times, the Super Cup 3 times, the IFA Shield a record 29 times, the Rovers Cup 10 times, the DCM Trophy 7 times, the Darjeeling Gold Cup 5 times and the McDowell's Cup 3 times. East Bengal has won an international title, the 2003 ASEAN Club Championship.

== History ==
=== Formation ===
On 28 July 1920, Jorabagan was scheduled to play against Mohun Bagan in the Coochbehar Cup. Jorabagan sent out their starting eleven but with the notable exclusion of defender Sailesh Bose, who was dropped from the squad for undisclosed reasons. The then vice-president of Jorabagan, Suresh Chandra Chaudhuri, asked in vain for Bose to be included in the line-up. When his request was not welcomed, Chaudhuri left the club along with Raja Manmatha Nath Chaudhuri, Ramesh Chandra Sen, and Aurobinda Ghosh. They formed East Bengal as a Sports and Cultural Association in the neighbourhood of Jorabagan on 1 August 1920. The name East Bengal was chosen for the newly formed club as the founders hailed from the eastern region of Bengal. Sarada Ranjan Ray took on the role of becoming the first president of this newly formed club while Suresh Chandra Chowdhury and Tarit Bhusan Roy were declared to be the first joint secretaries of the club. Soon after, Nagen Kali, M. Talukdar, B. Sen, N. Gossain, Goshto Paul (on loan from Mohun Bagan), P. Bardhan, S. Das, S. Tagore, J. Mukherjee, Ramesh Chandra Sen, S. Bose, C. Bose, A. Roy, and A. Bannerjee were announced to be the members of the first team squad by the board.

=== Early years: 1920s–1930s ===
In the same month of its formation, the club participated in its maiden tournament in, the Hercules Cup, a seven-a-side tournament. On 11 August 1920, the club played their first match in the tournament and in their history against Metropolitan College, which they went on to win 4–0. East Bengal went on to win the tournament, announcing the arrival of a club that would break many records in the future. The club also won Khagendra Shield in 1921. Following this, the club became affiliated with the Indian Football Association (IFA) and entered the IFA Second Division replacing Tajhat Football Club who withdrew from the 2nd Division League. The club finished placing third in their maiden season in the league. The first match between East Bengal and Mohun Bagan took place on 8 August 1921 in the Cooch Behar Cup semi-final match, which didn't turn in the favour of either of the teams as it ended in a goalless draw. It was an unofficial derby at that time.

In 1924, the club won the Second Division and gained promotion to the IFA First Division after finishing in second place to Cameroons 'B' after paying a hefty sum. As Cameroons 'A' team was already in the First Division the 'B' team could not gain promotion to the same league. East Bengal was next in line for promotion. However, more controversy arose since the IFA allowed only two Indian-based clubs in the IFA First Division at a time (at that time, the IFA was a British organization). This rule had previously deprived clubs like Kumartuli and Town from entering the First Division. During a governing body meeting of the IFA, the nine British clubs approved East Bengal's promotion to the First Division. Ironically, the two Indian clubs, Mohun Bagan and Aryan, opposed it. East Bengal's efforts led to the abolition of the oppressive Indian club limit rule.

In 1925, East Bengal made its IFA First Division debut, and Mona Dutta became the maiden goalscorer for the club in the league. On 28 May 1925, the first official Kolkata Derby was played, where Nepal Chakraborty scored the only goal for East Bengal.

=== 1940s–1970s ===
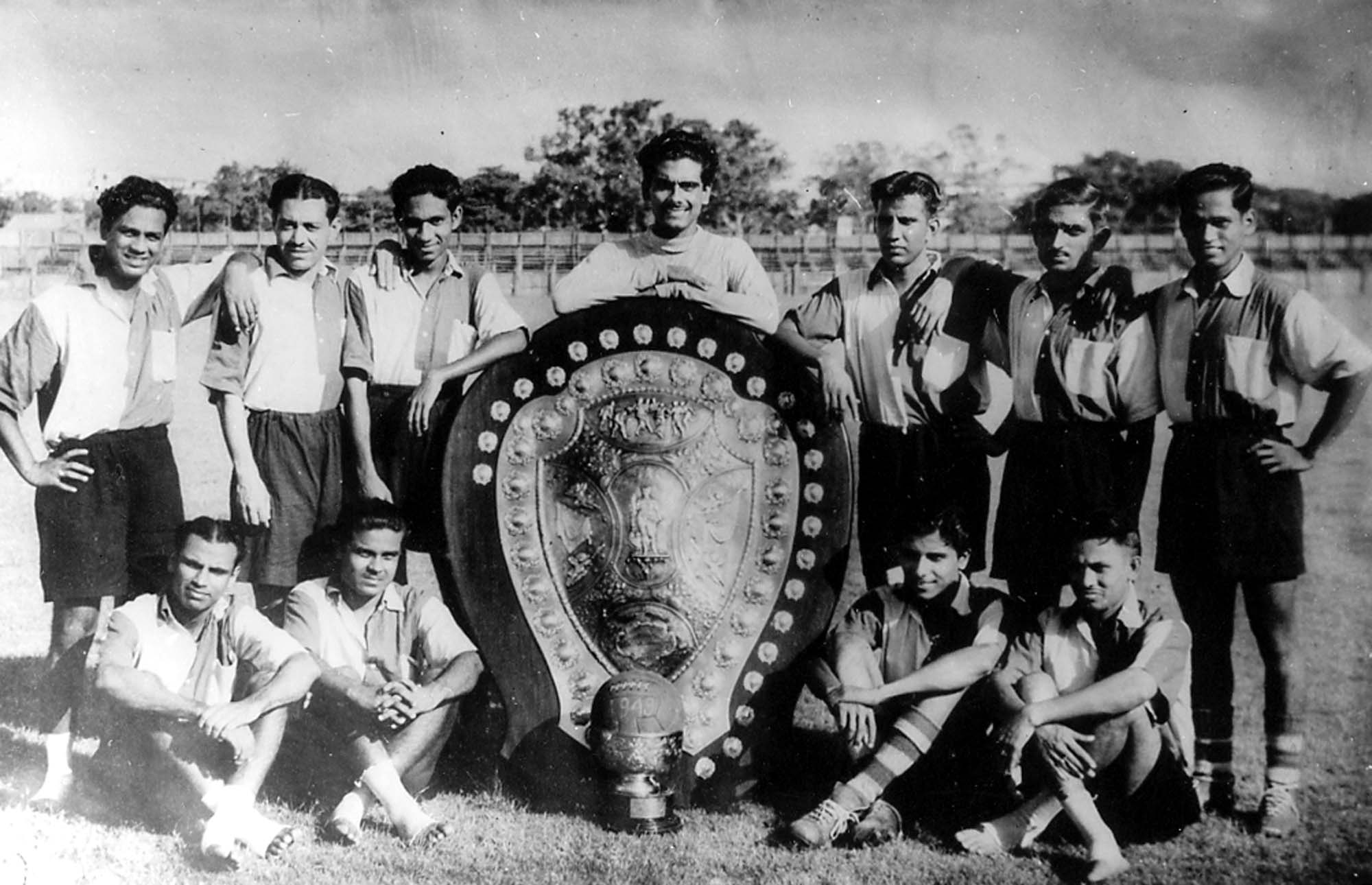
East Bengal players after winning 1949 IFA Shield

The club did not win their first IFA First Division title until 1942. East Bengal won their first IFA Shield in 1943. They then achieved the double in 1945 by winning both the Calcutta Football League (CFL) and IFA Shield. In 1948, East Bengal became the first team to defeat a foreign club on home soil. They won 2–0 against the visiting Chinese Olympic XI. East Bengal won their first treble in the 1949 season, by winning the Calcutta League, the IFA Shield and the Rovers Cup, becoming the first Indian club to do so. The club went on to win the 1949 Rovers Cup and the Durand Cup in 1951. That period saw the rise of the Pancha Pandavas. The five players, P. B. A. Saleh, Ahmed Khan, P. Venkatesh, Appa Rao, and K. P. Dhanaraj played together at the club from 1949 to 1953. The club also won its first DCM Trophy in 1950. The club also won three straight IFA Shields in 1949, 1950, and 1951. The English Football Association 1951–52 annual almanac adjudged East Bengal as the best club in Asia. On being recommended by the president of India, Rajendra Prasad, the club was invited by the Romania Youth Festival Committee in 1953 to participate in a football tournament. They also partook in a tour of the Soviet Union the same year. They were defeated by Soviet side by a margin of 13–1. Apart from football, East Bengal also won the Beighton Cup hockey tournament for the first time in 1957 and the Bengal Hockey Association league in 1960. Again the club won the Rovers Cup several times during this era—1962, 1967, 1969, 1972, 1973, 1975—as well as the Durand Cup in 1952, 1956, 1960, 1967, 1970, 1972 and 1978. The club also won its first Sait Nagjee football tournament and Bordoloi Trophy in 1968. The club stunned everyone by winning the 1970 IFA Shield against PAS Club of Iran by a score of 1–0, in front of 60,000 supporters at the Eden Gardens. Later, the club won the 1973 IFA Shield by defeating Pyongyang City SC of North Korea. In 1978, East Bengal won its first Federation Cup title. The club became joint winners in cricket with Mohun Bagan of Cricket Association of Bengal senior league and senior-division knockout tournament.

East Bengal won the Calcutta Football League for six straight years from 1970 to 1975. In 1970, East Bengal topped the Calcutta Football League table without conceding a single goal. East Bengal won multiple times against their arch-rivals, Mohun Bagan, including a record margin of 5–0 in the history of the Kolkata Derby, in 1975. The same year, East Bengal won the CFL title without losing a match. The 1970s decade of the club is also commonly known as "Shonali Doshok" (in English Golden Decade).

=== 1980s–1990s ===
The club won the Federation Cup in 1980 and again in 1985. They also became the first Indian club to play in the newly reorganized Asian Club Championship in 1985–86. The club then won their second treble in 1990, under coach Naeemuddin, by winning the IFA Shield, the Rovers Cup, and the Durand Cup in the same season. The club also won the Stafford Cup (1986) and the McDowell's Cup (1995, 1997). In 1993, East Bengal won its first-ever international title, the Wai Wai Cup in Nepal. The club also won the Federation Cup, the IFA Shield, the Calcutta Football League, the Durand Cup, and the Rovers Cup several times during this period. In 1996, the club became the founding member of the first nationwide football league in India, the National Football League.

In 1984, Dipak Das joined the club and revamped it. He brought professionalism and converted the football team into a private, limited company. He also secured sponsorship from local brands and companies like Khadims. In 1998, he collaborated with Vijay Mallya's United Breweries Group, which then formed a new Private Limited Company, with a 50–50 shareholding, called United East Bengal Football Team Private Limited and incorporated the football team—the first in the country. The team was renamed Kingfisher East Bengal FC.

=== 2000s–2010s ===

East Bengal 2003 ASEAN Club Championship final lineup

The club entered the 21st century in style, winning the 2000–01 National Football League season. They became the first club to win back-to-back titles after winning the 2002–03 and 2003–04 versions of the league. The club went on to win the Federation Cup again in 2007, 2009, 2010 and 2012. They also won the Indian Super Cup in 2006 and 2011. The club won their third international trophy in the 2003 ASEAN Club Championship, in Jakarta, Indonesia. East Bengal is still the only Indian football team to win any major trophy outside the country. In 2004, East Bengal also won the San Miguel International Cup in Nepal. The club was invited to the tournament by Leicester City, celebrating their 120th Anniversary. In 2004, Leicester City also had partnerships with East Bengal. Then FIFA president, Joseph Blatter, visited the club tent on 15 April 2007. After a year, East Bengal became the first Indian football team to win against a West Asian team, Al Wihdat SC of Jordan on foreign soil.

Lineup against Army Red in Durand Cup. The first match of centenary season.

East Bengal also made a record eight appearances, between 2004 and 2015, in the AFC Cup. The club played in the semi-finals of 2013 AFC Cup where they lost to Kuwait SC of Kuwait. The club has the achievement of winning the Calcutta Football League title eight consecutive times from 2010 to 2017, breaking their previous record of six times during the 1970s. Following the exit of Kingfisher from the club, Quess Corp signed an agreement with the East Bengal and acquired a 70 percent stake in the club in July 2018. The football team was rebranded as Quess East Bengal FC.

On 1 August 2019, the club entered its 100th establishment year. A centenary celebration logo was introduced. Torch rallies and events were organised, and attended by former players, coaches, presidents, etc. The centenary kit was unveiled, which was inspired by the 1925–26 season kit. The club participated in the Durand Cup, the Calcutta Football League and the I-League, and played its first match and won against Army Red in the Durand Cup.

=== 2020–present ===
The year 2020, saw the wake of COVID-19 which halted the ongoing football season in the country. The then investor, Quess pulled out from the two-year-old agreement by July 2020. On 1 August, the club completed its 100 years of existence. In September, Shree Cement was announced as the new investor of the club. The company acquired 76 percent shares of the club and renamed it from "East Bengal Football Club" to "Sporting Club East Bengal". Later that month, after successful bidding, the club moved from the I-League to the Indian Super League. In early 2022, the club parted ways with its investor Shree Cement.

The partnership between investor group Shree Cement and East Bengal was terminated after the end of the 2021–22 Indian Super League. They returned the sporting rights to the club on 12 April 2022, after both the parties failed to reach an agreement and the final term sheet was not accepted and signed by the club officials. The club officials, however, stated that East Bengal shall continue to play in the Indian Super League, and shall be announcing their new investors within the next two weeks. East Bengal was once again handed another transfer ban by AIFF for non-payment of dues for seven of their players.

On 25 May, East Bengal announced the collaboration with Emami as the principal investors of the club. The club confirmed their participation in the 2022–23 Indian Super League with the arrival of the new investors. On 18 July, after two months of contractual discussions between the club and the investor group, the club finally started the recruitment process for the new season after receiving a go-ahead from the investors. On 22 July, the AIFF uplifted the transfer ban set on East Bengal and thus allowed the club to register their new signings for the season. East Bengal appointed Santosh Trophy winning Kerala football team head-coach Bino George as the care-taker head coach of the team for the Calcutta Football League and Durand Cup, and will become the assistant coach of the team for the Indian Super League. East Bengal also roped in former India national football team coach Stephen Constantine as the new head-coach of the team for the season. The club also announced that the formal tie-up between them and the new investor group Emami. Emami East Bengal FC has hired former Indian Super League (ISL) champion Carles Cuadrat as their new head coach on a two-year deal. On 28 January 2024, they defeated the defending champions Odisha 3–2 in the Kalinga Super Cup final to win their first title in 12 years, and qualified for the AFC Champions League 2 play-offs. As the winners, East Bengal qualified for the 2024–25 AFC Champions League Two preliminary stage but lost 3–2 against FC Altyn Asyr. On 21 May 2026, East Bengal became the 2025–26 Indian Super League champions, thus finally ending a twenty-two year long wait for a top tier national league title.

== Crest, colours and kits ==
=== Crest ===
First crest

In 1930, Mahatma Gandhi's Satyagraha swept over India and affected football. Indian clubs boycotted the ongoing Calcutta Football League midway through the season. Amidst much confusion, Royal Regiment was declared the winner in the first division. However, East Bengal was not allowed to be promoted to the First Division. Thousands of East Bengal fans and officials decided to hold a protest march at the East Bengal Ground. It was at this march that flaming torches were carried by the protesters. And the hand holding flame torch (known as 'Mawshal' or 'মশাল' in Bangla) became the club emblem, which has remained to this day. In the year of 2020, East Bengal released a special centenary crest to celebrate 100 years of its existence.

=== Colours ===
The primary and secondary colors of East Bengal are red and yellow respectively. Traditionally, the home kit consists of a red and yellow jersey with black shorts, while the away kit colors vary every year. These colors came about after the club was formed when the founders debated over them for the club jersey. At that time, the jerseys used to come from England. The founders, while searching, came across the red and gold color shirt hanging at the Whiteaway, Laidlaw & Co. department store in Chowringhee, Kolkata. It attracted them, and they finalized the colors and jersey. It cost ₹80 in 1920, four times higher than the average. These colours permanently integrated with the club.

Traditional kit	Centenary year kit

=== Kit manufacturers and shirt sponsors ===
Period	Kit manufacturer	Shirt sponsor	Back sponsor
1993–94		Verona	
1994–95		McDowell's No.1	
1995–96		Emami	
1996–97	Umbro	Emami	
1997–98	Duta Sports	Khadim's	
1998–00	Adidas	Kingfisher	
2000–05	Reebok	Kingfisher	
2005–06	Pony	Kingfisher	
2006–09	Reebok	Kingfisher	
2009–10	Reebok	Kingfisher	ONGC
2010–11		Kingfisher	Saradha
2011–14		Kingfisher	Sahara
2014–15	Shiv Naresh	Kingfisher	Artage
2015–16	Shiv Naresh	Kingfisher	SRMB
2016–17	Shiv Naresh	Kingfisher	Officer's Choice
2017–18	Perf	Kingfisher	Shyam Steel
2018–19	Perf	Quess	
2019–20	Kaizen Sports	Quess	
2020–21	TYKA	Shree Cement	TV9 Bangla
2021–22	Reyaur	Shree Cement	
2022–23	Trak-Only	1XBat	Mantra Masala
2023–24	Trak-Only	Batery	
2024–25	Trak-Only	Emami	
2025–27	Trak-Only	Emami	Kingfisher

== Supporters ==
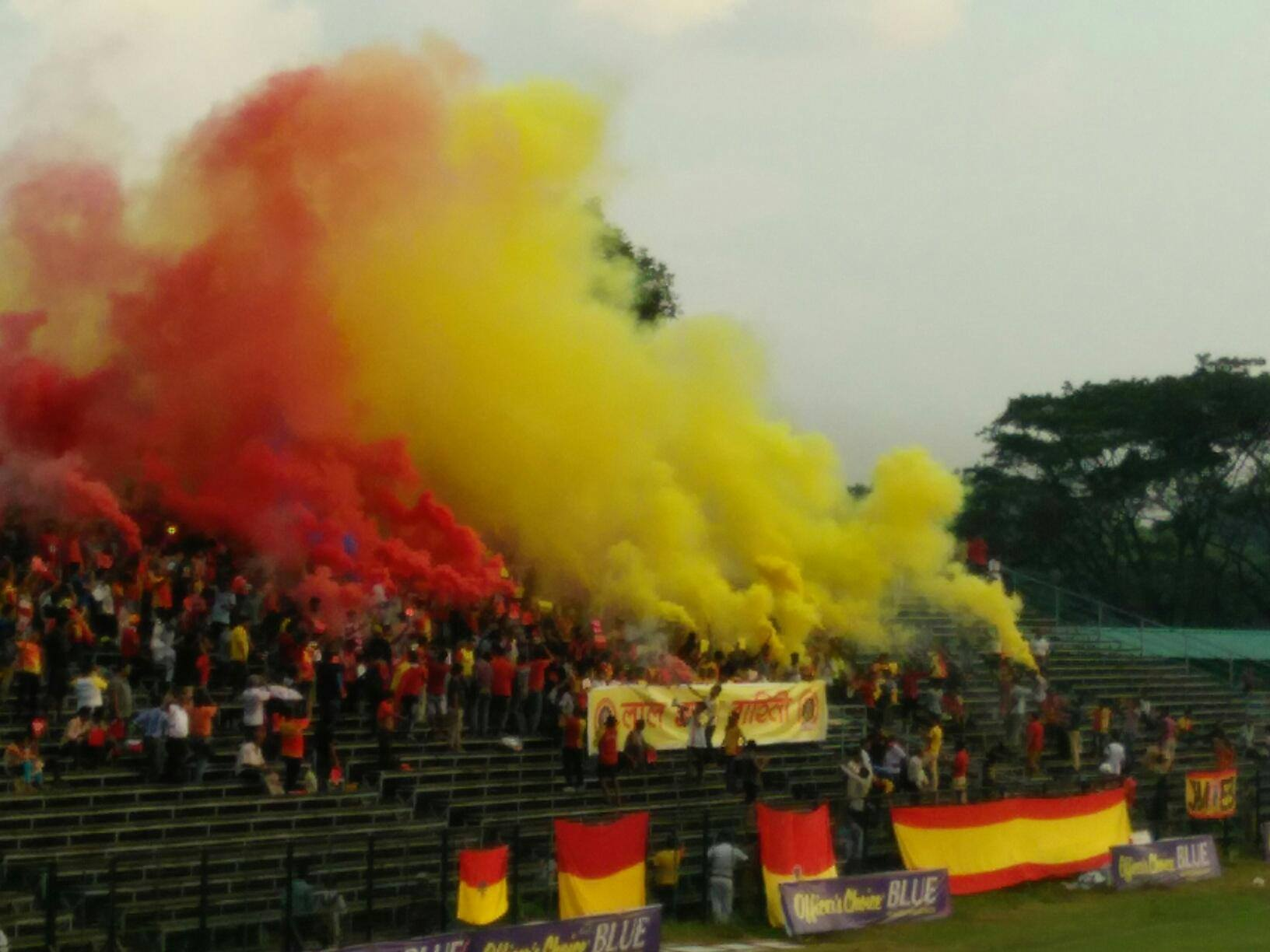
Smoke show during a CFL match against NBP Rainbow at East Bengal Ground

East Bengal is a club mainly supported by the migrant population, known as Bangals. There are approximately 30 to 40 million supporters from all across the nation and overseas. In October 2020, the club got voted as the most popular football club in India on an AFC poll by its supporters, gaining approximately 49% of the votes.

East Bengal Ultras, the main ultras (supporters) group of East Bengal, was established in 2013. It was the first ultras group to be established in the country. Since its inception, this group has set many new records and broken older ones. Though initially, people were skeptical about the group, now they have seen in what ways this group is benefitting Indian football. Though all these achievements came along with some controversies. As in the past, there have been fights and hooliganism among the fans of the rival clubs, the administration does not completely trust the group's functioning.

Established on 15 November 2006, East Bengal the Real Power is India's first registered fan club. It is East Bengal's largest fan club and one of the largest in the country. In its early years, its functioning was limited to online platforms, but later on, it became a supporters' group.

== Rivalries ==
=== Kolkata Derby ===
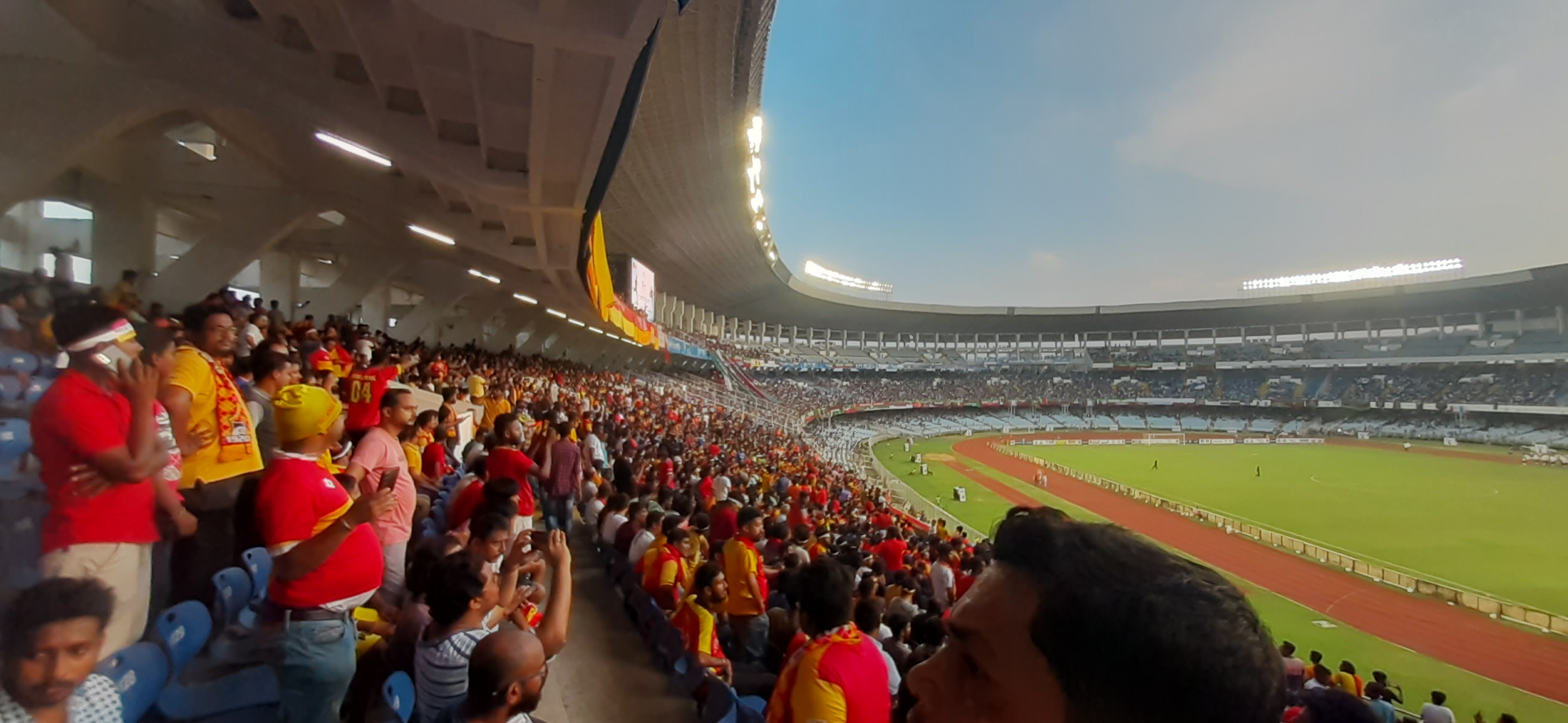
East Bengal supporters at Salt Lake Stadium during the Kolkata Derby in 2022 Durand Cup

East Bengal has its fiercest rivalry with Mohun Bagan. The match that takes place between these two clubs is eminently called the Kolkata Derby. The Kolkata Derby has much similarities with the Old Firm Derby played between Celtic and Rangers due to its socio-economic significance. It is one of the oldest rivalries in world sports and dates back to the 1920s. These clubs also share a rivalry due to the fierce competition that existed between them in the Indian football circuit for over a hundred years, both being the two most successful clubs in India, and one of the most decorated in Asia, both having won 190+ titles. After Indian independence, the consequent second partition of Bengal led to huge influx of Bengali immigrants from the eastern part of Bengal into the neighbouring states which resulted in a socio-economic crisis in many of them. This led to rivalries in jobs, business, schools, and even on the football pitch among the immigrants and native population. This rivalry became fierce, and the Kolkata Derby grew in popularity and reached its peak during the 1960s and 1970s. "Probashi Bengalis" from all over India and the world would also set their keen eyes on this event, as it was a way for them to re-integrate with their culture after the partition. The Kolkata Derby consistently brings in 60,000+ spectators on each match day and remains as one of the most viewed sporting events in the country. Both sets of supporters have unconditional love for their clubs, which is often vocalized in the form of chants and displaying tifos. The Kolkata Derby holds a record of 130,000 spectators, the most attended sporting event ever in India.

=== Mini Derby ===
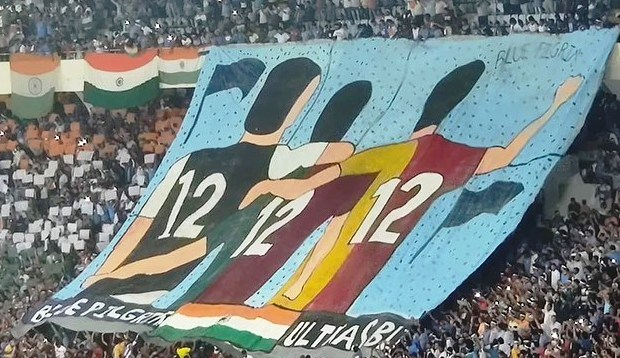
Tifo displaying fans of (left to right) Mohammedan, Mohun Bagan and East Bengal united as the 12th man in support for India at Vivekananda Yuba Bharati Krirangan in 2019.

East Bengal also has a significant rivalry against Mohammedan. The initiation of the feuds goes back to the early 30s, when Mohammedan came out as a dominant contender for Calcutta Football League by winning seven out of eight titles from 1934 to 1941. Since then until 1958, all the CFL titles were won among these three rival clubs, often referred as the Big Three of Maidan (Bengali: ময়দানের তিন প্রধান), and even in other major tournaments like Durand Cup, Rover's Cup and IFA Shield, the three clubs contended against each other for the honours. The rivalry initially had a communal background since Mohammedan being a Muslim-only club representing the Muslim population of Kolkata, thereby forcing the Hindus in the city to compete via their support for Mohun Bagan and East Bengal even though they weren't communal clubs themselves. By the 1960s, communal tension involved in the feud became insignificant as the club began to regularly sign non-Muslim players as well. But the club also lost their dominance in Indian football and after the inception of national tournaments like Federation Cup and National Football League, Mohammedan was no more a top club and mostly playing in the lower tiers. Thus, the club rarely met Mohun Bagan and East Bengal at major tournaments due to them being in the top tier. Mohammedan won the I-league in 2023–24 season and was promoted to ISL. Unlike the ever fierce East Bengal-Mohun Bagan feud termed as Kolkata Derby, the matches including Mohammedan and Mohun Bagan or East Bengal is commonly termed as Mini Kolkata Derby.

== Ownership ==
East Bengal is organized as a registered society under the Societies Registration Act, 1860, which means one can avail membership of the club. There are around 12,000 members. Although, a limited company, named East Bengal Club Pvt. Ltd., was later formed, and both are governed by the club parallelly. Sponsorships and investments happen via this corporate company. The club is governed by its own set of rules and regulations. Amendments and resolutions are passed via extraordinary or annual general meeting.

== Stadiums ==
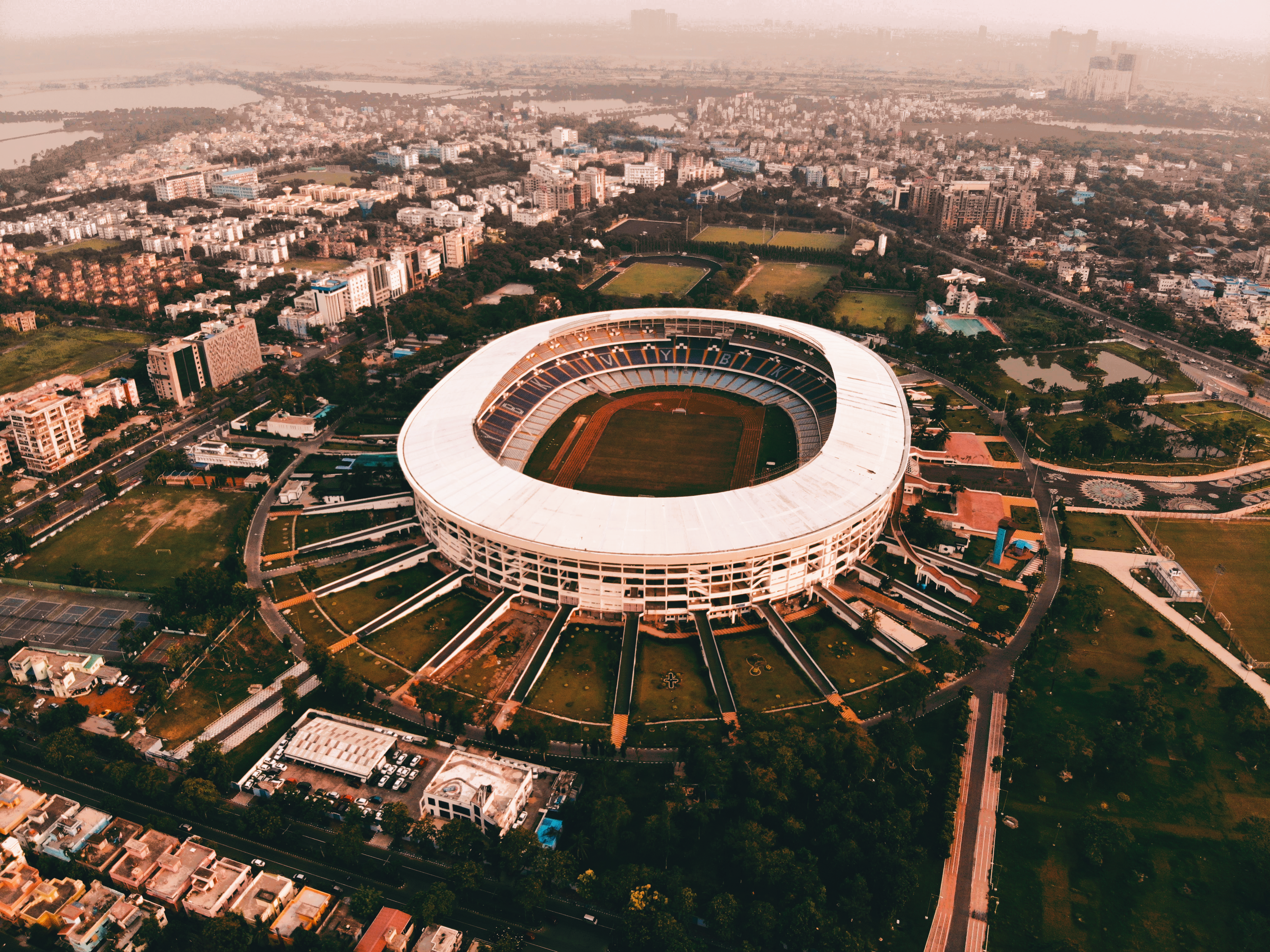
Salt Lake Stadium

The club has used several stadiums at Kolkata, Howrah and Barasat, including the Eden Gardens, which has been reserved for cricket since Salt Lake Stadium opened in 1984. The first ground used by the club was Kumartuli Park in north Kolkata.

=== Salt Lake Stadium ===
The Salt Lake Stadium, also known as Vivekananda Yuba Bharati Krirangan (VYBK), is a multi-purpose stadium in Kolkata, built in 1984. The Salt Lake Stadium hosts the majority home games of East Bengal. The total capacity of the stadium has been 85,000.

=== East Bengal Ground ===
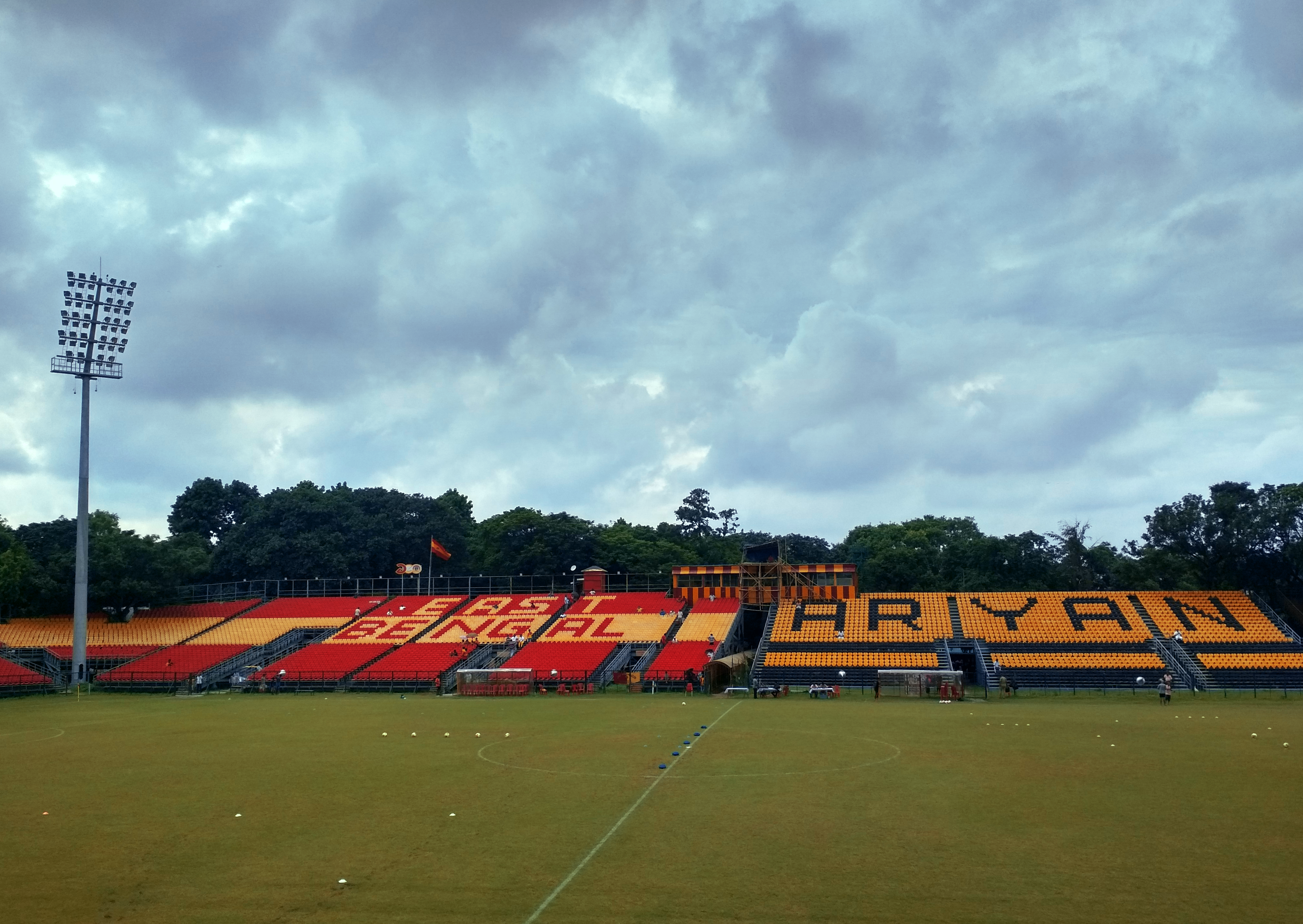
East Bengal Ground

The East Bengal Ground is located in Kolkata and is the club's historical home ground.The stadium lies in the Maidan (Kolkata) area on the northern side of Fort William and near the Eden Gardens. This stadium is used mostly for Calcutta Football League matches and by the academy, women's, and hockey teams. The total capacity of the stadium is 23,500.

=== Other grounds ===
Barasat Stadium is also used by the club for some regional matches, especially in cases where the Salt Lake Stadium or East Bengal Ground cannot be used. Kanchenjunga Stadium, a multipurpose stadium based in Siliguri, has also been used several times to host club football matches. It also hosted the 2012 Federation Cup. Kalyani Stadium, situated on the outskirts of Kolkata at Kalyani, was used by East Bengal as their home turf during the 2019–20 I-League.

The team also trains at one of the VYBK practice grounds.

== Players ==
=== Current squad ===
As of February 2026

Note: Flags indicate national team as defined under FIFA eligibility rules; some limited exceptions apply. Players may hold more than one non-FIFA nationality.

No.	Pos.	Nation	Player
1	GK	IND	Phurba Lachenpa
3	DF	IND	Hardik Bhatt
4	DF	IND	Anwar Ali
5	DF	IND	Lalchungnunga
7	MF	IND	Akshat Singh
7	FW	IND	Vishnu P. V.
8	MF	AUS	Chris Ikonomidis
10	FW	IND	Edmund Lalrindika
11	MF	ESP	Dani Ramírez
12	DF	IND	Mohammad Rakip
13	GK	IND	Prabhsukhan Singh Gill
14	FW	IND	David Lalhlansanga
15	FW	IND	Mahesh Singh Naorem (captain)
16	DF	IND	Martand Raina
17	DF	IND	Boris Singh Thangjam
18	DF	IND	Narender Gehlot
19	MF	IND	Rohit Danu

No.	Pos.	Nation	Player
20	MF	IND	Raynier Fernandes
21	MF	CRO	Diego Živulić
22	FW	IND	Jesin TK
23	MF	IND	Souvik Chakrabarti
25	MF	IND	Jeakson Singh Thounaojam
27	DF	IND	Jay Gupta
29	MF	IND	Bipin Singh Thounaojam
34	DF	IND	Sandip Mandi
36	MF	IND	Mohammed Asif Khan
69	DF	IND	Sonam Tsewang Lhokham
74	MF	PLE	Mohammed Rashid (vice-captain)
86	DF	IND	Joseph Justin
90	FW	CIV	Aké Arnaud Loba
95	GK	IND	Gourab Shaw
99	FW	POL	Łukasz Zwoliński
—	MF	IND	Danish Farooq Bhat

=== Promoted from reserve squad ===
Note: Flags indicate national team as defined under FIFA eligibility rules; some limited exceptions apply. Players may hold more than one non-FIFA nationality.

No.	Pos.	Nation	Player
1	GK	IND	Aditya Patra (Captain)
30	MF	IND	Vanlalpeka Guite
58	MF	IND	Sanjib Ghosh
59	FW	IND	Jesin TK
61	MF	IND	Tanmay Das (Vice Captain)
63	DF	IND	Monotosh Chakladar
64	MF	IND	Naseeb Rahaman
66	MF	IND	Shyamal Beshra

No.	Pos.	Nation	Player
72	DF	IND	Bikram Pradhan
80	MF	IND	Ajad Sahim
85	DF	IND	Chaku Mandi
90	DF	IND	Joseph Justin
95	GK	IND	Gourab Shaw

== Personnel ==
=== Current technical staff ===
Position	Name
Head coach	(Spain) Antonio López Habas
Assistant coach	(India) Bino George
Goalkeeping coach	
Fitness coach	Vacant
Head of physiotherapist	(India) Dr. Firoz Shaikh
Assistant physiotherapist	(India) Arghya Basu
Team manager	(India) Pratim Kumar Saha
Performance & video analyst	(India) Aromal Vijayan
Team doctor	(India) Dr. Deepak Babu
Masseur	(India) Rajesh Basak

=== Corporate team ===
As of May 2025

Position	Name
CEO	(India) Namrata Parekh
General manager	(India) Kamal Biswas
Media manager	(India) Ritam Basu
Team photographer	(India) Tanmoy Das
Operations and accreditation manager	(India) Aritra Dutta

== Management ==
As of November 2024

Role	Name
President	(India) Murari Lal Lohia
Chief advisor	(India) Pronab Dasgupta
Vice-presidents	(India) Ajoy Krishna Chatterjee, (India) Shankar Bagri, (India) Subhasish Chakraborty, (India) Kalyan Majumdar
General secretary	(India) Rupak Saha
Assistant general secretary	(India) Dr. Santi Ranjan Dasgupta
Finance secretary	(India) Sadananda Mukherjee
Treasurer	(India) Debdas Samajdar
Football secretary	(India) Saikat Ganguly
Cricket secretary	(India) Sanjib Acharya
Hockey secretary	(India) Prabir Kumar Dafaddar
Athletic secretary	(India) Partha Pratim Roy
Tennis secretary	(India) Indranil Ghosh
Ground secretary	(India) Rajat Guha
Executive committee members	(India) Jhulan Goswami, (India) Molly Ganguly, (India) Sri Subir Ganguly, (India) Santosh Bhattacharya, (India) Diptendu Mohan Bose, (India) Siddharta Sarcar, (India) Debabrata Sarkar, (India) Birendra Kumar Saha, (India) Dipankar Chakraborty, (India) Biswajit Mazumdar, (India) Tapan Roy, (India) Suman Dasgupta, (India) Aritra Roy Chowdhury, (India) Tamal Ghosal, (India) Beni Madhab Bhattacharya, (India) Manab Paul, (India) Subhasish Dasgupta, (India) Saroj Bhattacharjee, (India) Debasish Bose, (India) Bikash Dutta, (India) Biplab Paul

=== Board of directors ===
Emami Group	East Bengal
(India) Aditya V. Agarwal	(India) Debabrata Sarkar
(India) Manish Goenka	(India) Rupak Saha
(India) Sandeep Agrawal	(India) Sadananda Mukherjee
(India) Gatum Jatia	
(India) S. N. Paul	
(India) Saurabh Dasgupta	
(India) Manoj Agarwal	

== Records ==
=== Indian Super League ===
As of 20 November 2026

East Bengal league record in ISL
Season	Played	Won	Draw	Loss	GF	GA	GD	Points	Position	Play-offs	Ref
2020–21	20	3	8	9	22	33	−11	17	9th	Did not qualify	
2021–22	20	1	8	11	18	36	−18	11	11th	Did not qualify	
2022–23	20	6	1	13	22	38	−16	19	9th	Did not qualify	
2023–24	22	6	6	10	27	29	−2	24	9th	Did not qualify	
2024–25	24	8	4	12	27	33	-6	28	9th	Did not qualify	
2025–26	13	7	5	1	30	11	+19	26	Champions	Not Held	
2026–27	4	2	1	1	14	8	+6	7	5th	To be decided	
TOTAL	123	33	33	57	160	186	−32	132			

=== NFL/I-League ===
As of the end of 2019–20 season.

East Bengal league record in NFL/I-League
Season	Played	Won	Draw	Loss	GF	GA	GD	Points	Position	Ref
1996–97	5 (Note: Group Stage)	3	2	0	6	2	+4	11	Qualified for Championship stage	
1996–97	14	7	4	3	19	11	+8	25	3rd	
1997–98	18	8	7	3	18	10	+8	31	2nd	
1998–99	10 (Note: First Stage)	8	2	0	19	2	+17	26	Qualified for Second Stage	
1998–99	10	5	4	1	14	8	+6	19	2nd	
1999–00	22	8	8	6	25	21	+4	32	7th	
2000–01	22	13	7	2	30	9	+21	46	Champions	
2001–02	22	11	3	8	31	23	+8	36	5th	
2002–03	22	15	4	3	44	22	+22	49	Champions	
2003–04	22	15	4	3	37	13	+24	49	Champions	
2004–05	22	13	4	5	34	16	+18	43	3rd	
2005–06	17	9	4	4	25	16	+9	31	2nd	
2006–07	18	7	5	6	29	29	0	26	5th	
2007–08	18	5	4	9	17	23	−6	19	6th	
2008–09	22	7	7	8	31	26	+5	28	6th	
2009–10	26	7	10	9	27	31	−4	31	9th	
2010–11	26	15	6	5	44	21	+23	51	2nd	
2011–12	26	15	6	5	46	22	+24	51	2nd	
2012–13	26	13	8	5	44	18	+26	47	3rd	
2013–14	24	12	7	5	39	23	+16	43	2nd	
2014–15	20	8	5	7	30	28	+2	29	4th	
2015–16	16	7	4	5	22	18	+4	25	3rd	
2016–17	18	10	3	5	33	15	+18	33	3rd	
2017–18	18	8	7	3	32	19	+13	31	4th	
2018–19	20	13	3	4	37	20	+17	42	2nd	
2019–20	16	6	5	5	23	18	+4	20	cancelled (Note: The 2019–20 I-League was cancelled after 16 Rounds due to the COVID-19 pandemic. East Bengal FC was in second place when the league was cancelled.)	
TOTAL	500	248	133	119	756	464	+292	877		

== Performance in AFC competitions ==
Competition	Appearances	Seasons	Best result
Asian Club Championship	2	1985–86, 1998–99	Group stage
Asian Cup Winners' Cup	5	1991–92, 1993–94, 1994–95, 1995, 1997–98	Quarter-finals (1991–92)
AFC Cup/AFC Champions League Two	10	2004, 2005, 2008, 2010, 2011, 2012, 2013, 2015, 2024–25, 2026–27	Semi-finals (2013)
AFC Challenge League	1	2024–25	Quarter-finals (2024-25)

== Honours ==
East Bengal Club has won honours both domestically and in international competitions. They have won the National Football League title 3 times and the Federation Cup 8 times. They also won the Calcutta Football League a record 41 times and the IFA Shield a record 29 times including Durand Cup 17 times and Rovers Cup 10 times. The club has won more than 150 trophies, which are listed below:

- Record
- ^{S} Shared record
- Italicised denotes that the tournament is discontinued.

East Bengal Club honours
Type	Tournament	No.	Years
AFC Central Asia Qualifier
AFC	Central Asia Champions' Cup	1	1985
International
AFF	ASEAN Club Championship	1^{S}	2003
National
(India) National Football League/Indian Super League		4	2000–01, 2002–03, 2003–04, 2025–26
(India) Federation Cup/Super Cup		9	1978, 1980, 1985, 1996, 2007, 2009–10, 2010, 2012, 2024
(India) Durand Cup		17^{S}	1951, 1952, 1956, 1960, 1967, 1970, 1972, 1978, 1982, 1989, 1990, 1991, 1993, 1995, 2002, 2004, 2026
(India) Indian Super Cup		3	1997, 2006, 2011
Total		33	
Regional (Major Trophies)
(India) Calcutta Football League		41	1942, 1945, 1946, 1949, 1950, 1952, 1961, 1966, 1970, 1971, 1972, 1973, 1974, 1975, 1977, 1982, 1985, 1987, 1988, 1989, 1991, 1993, 1995, 1996, 1998, 1999, 2000, 2002, 2003, 2004, 2006, 2010, 2011, 2012, 2013, 2014, 2015, 2016, 2017, 2024, 2025
(India) IFA Shield		29	1943, 1945, 1949, 1950, 1951, 1958, 1961, 1965, 1966, 1970, 1972, 1973, 1974, 1975, 1976, 1981, 1983, 1984, 1986, 1990, 1991, 1994, 1995, 1997, 2000, 2001, 2002–03, 2012
(India) Rovers Cup		10	1949, 1962, 1967, 1969, 1972, 1973, 1975, 1980, 1990, 1994
Total		151	
All Total		186^{m}	

- ^{m} Including minor trophies

== Gallery ==
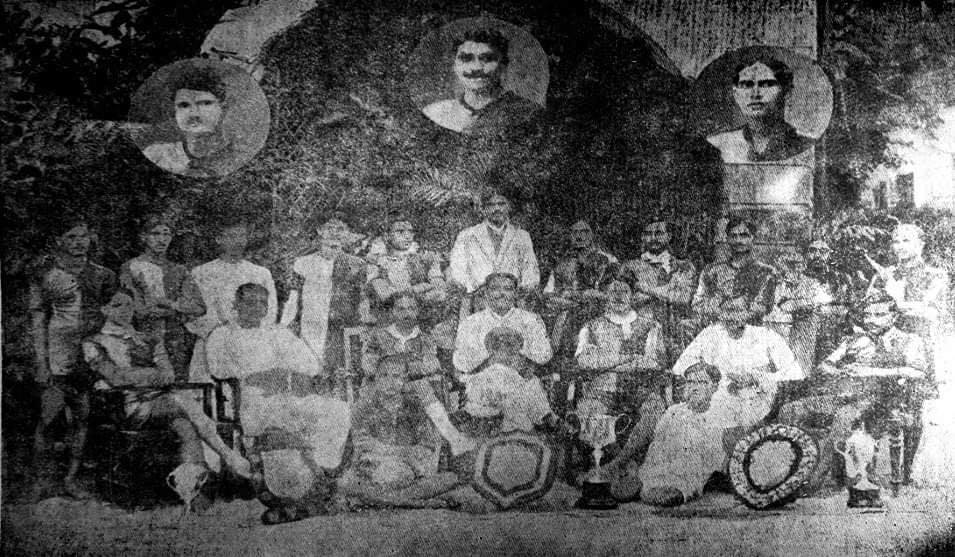
East Bengal players and officials in 1921.

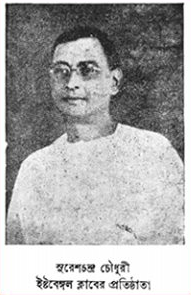
Portrait of Suresh Chandra Chowdhury (founder)

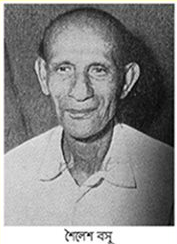
Portrait of Sailesh Bose

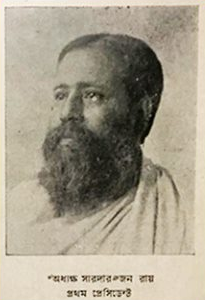
Side profile of Sarada Ranjan Roy (First president)

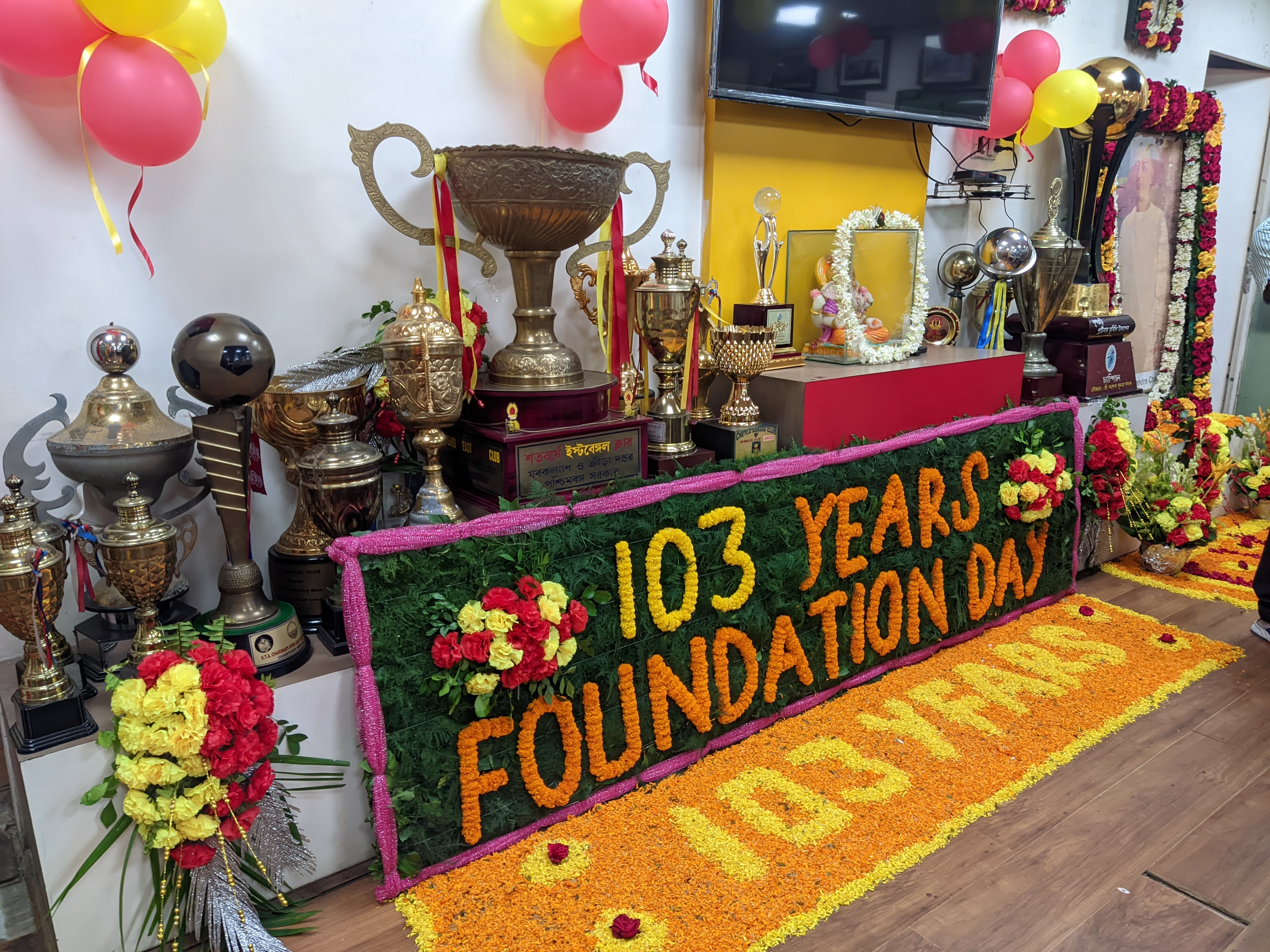
Trophy cabinet of East Bengal during the 103 years of foundation day.

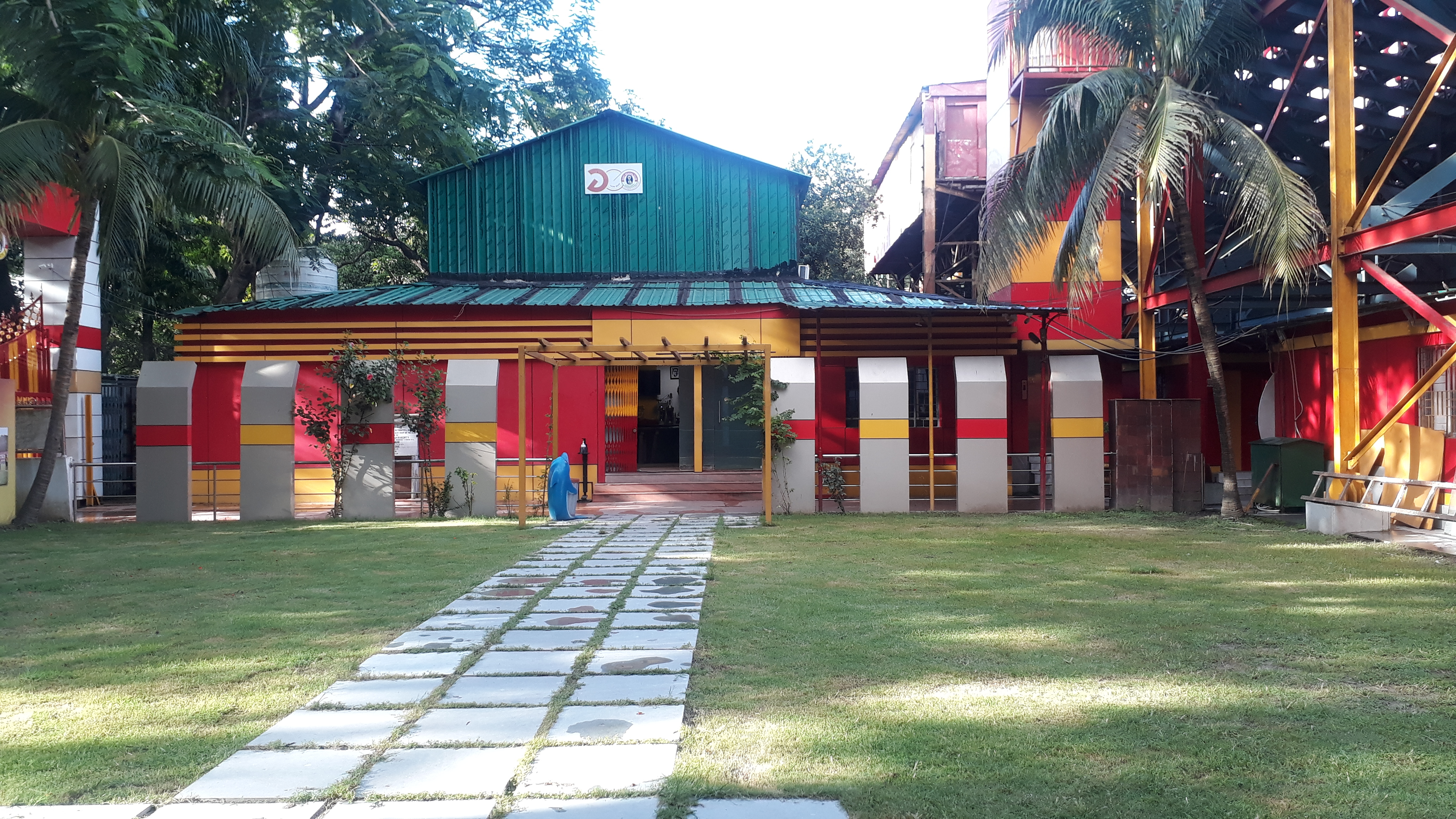
East Bengal tent.

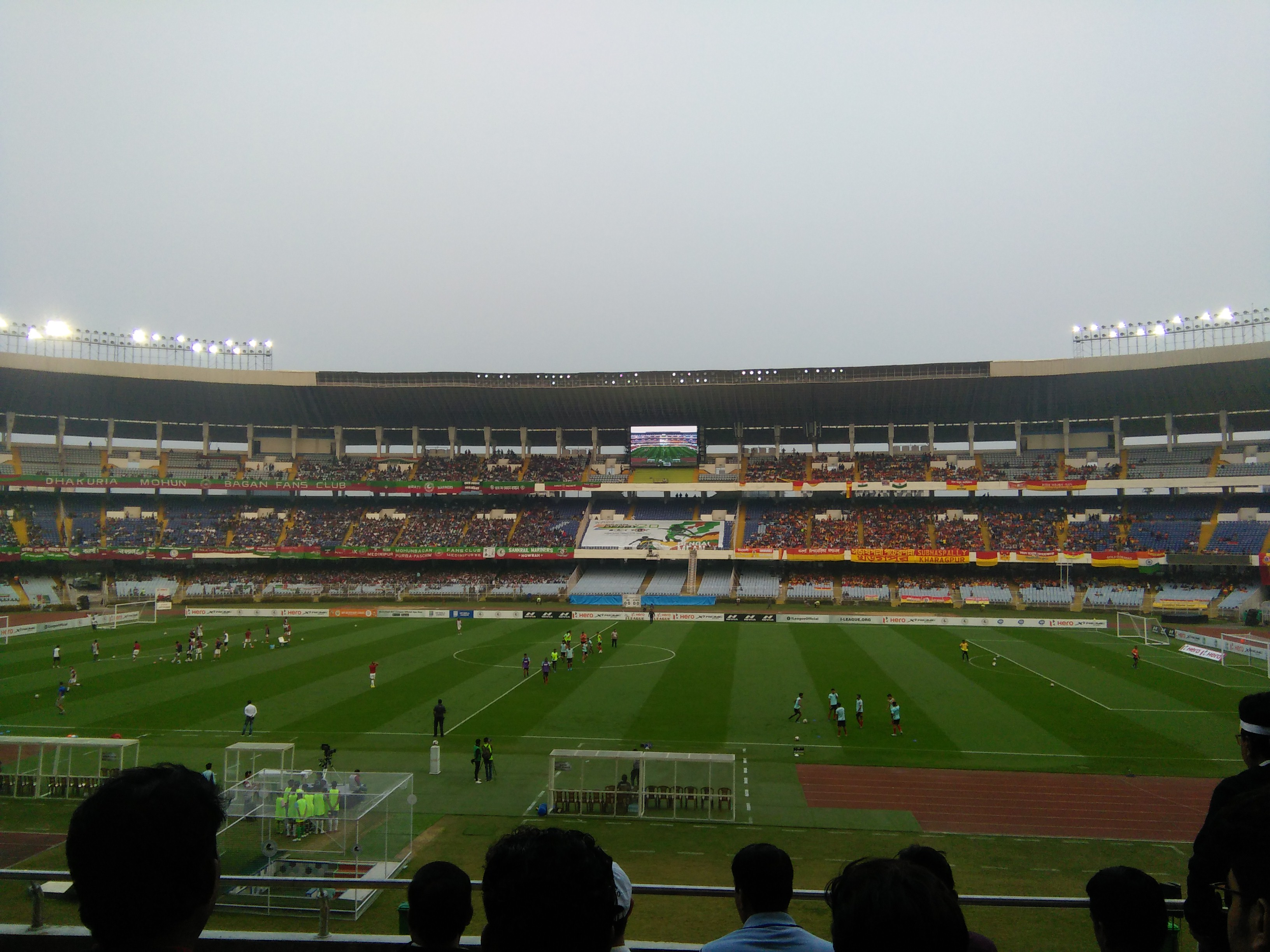
2019–20 season Kolkata Derby at the Salt Lake Stadium.

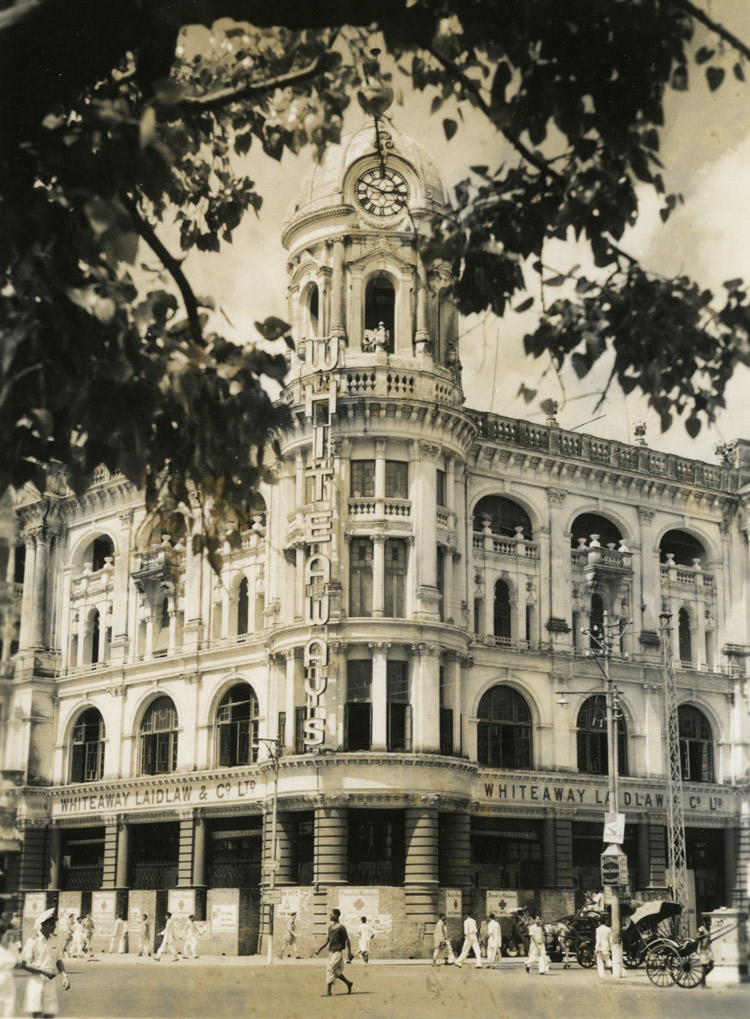
Whiteaway, Laidlaw & Co. department store in 1945.

== Affiliated clubs ==
The following club was formerly affiliated with East Bengal:

- (England) Leicester City (2002–2003)

The following club is currently affiliated with East Bengal:

- (Bangladesh) Sheikh Russel KC (2022–present)

== See also ==
- East Bengal in international football
- East Bengal league record by opponent
- List of East Bengal matches against Foreign teams
- List of foreign players for East Bengal
- List of East Bengal records and statistics
- Indian football clubs in Asian competitions
