= Yellow Army =

Yellow Army may refer to:

- Canvey Island F.C.
- Central Coast Mariners FC
- NAC Breda
- Norwich City F.C.
- Oxford United F.C.
- Watford F.C.
- Manjappada Kerala Blasters Fans
- Chennai Super Kings
- ASM Clermont Auvergne
- Torquay United F.C
