= East Bengal the Real Power =

Supporters group of East Bengal Football Club

- Abbreviation: EBRP
- Founded: 15 November 2006; 19 years ago
- Type: Supporters' group
- Club: East Bengal FC
- Motto: Born to Win
- Stadium: East Bengal Ground; Salt Lake Stadium
- Founder: Rabi Shankar Sen
- Colors: Red and Gold
- Website: Website

East Bengal the Real Power (EBRP) is the first registered fan club in India, which was established on 15 November 2006, and supports East Bengal FC. It is one of the largest fan clubs in the country. It helps the fans and the club during match days, organises various social activities and events. It also runs a U19 football coaching camp. They started as an Orkut group and gradually expanded into a supporter group of over 150,000 members. It played a major role in the centenary celebrations of East Bengal by hoisting club flags in 50 Indian cities and 50 other cities all over the world.

== History ==
Before the formation of East Bengal the Real Power or EBRP, there were no such organised fan clubs or supporter groups of East Bengal and in Kolkata football. East Bengal the Real Power was formed with the purpose to condense the spread fan support of East Bengal. It was initially established in Orkut. It also became the first online fans community in Asia. In the initial years, it was restricted to online platforms only, and later it turned into a real supporter group. Today, the group is not only restricted to India, but has spread all over the world with over 1.5 lakh (150,000) members.

== Supported club ==
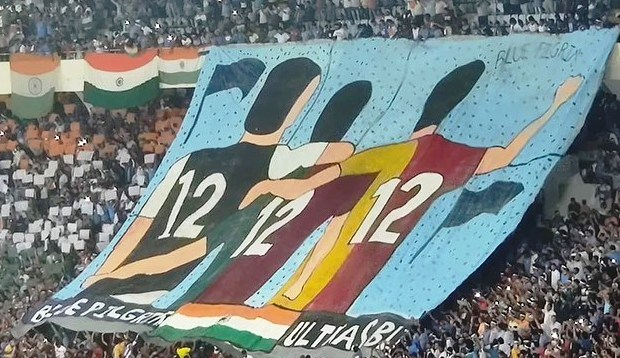
Tifo displaying fans of Mohammedan, Mohun Bagan, and East Bengal united as the "12th man" of the national team.

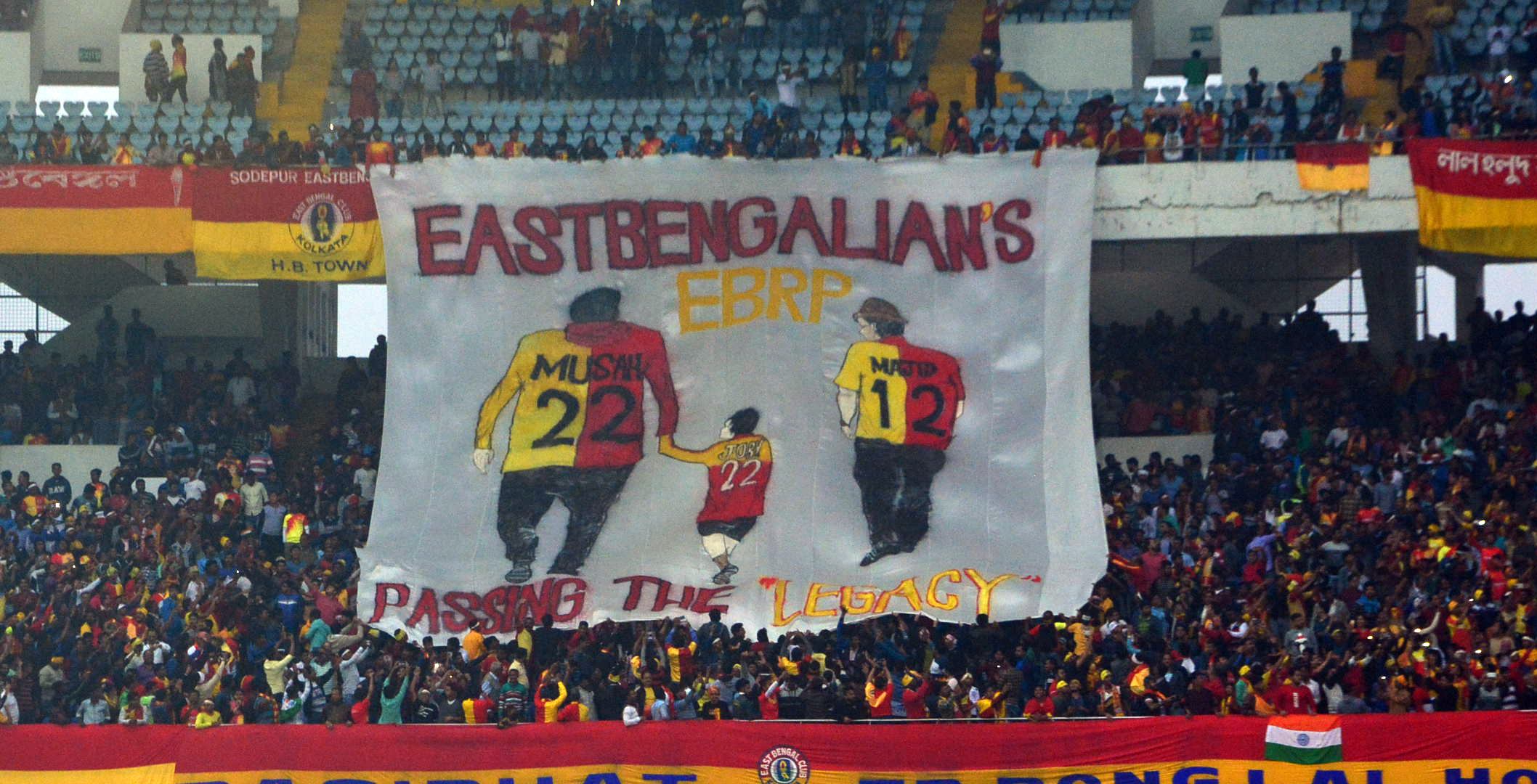
Tifo by East Bengal the Real Power

East Bengal FC is one of the oldest and most successful football clubs in the country, which currently plays in the Indian Super League. The club was established on 1 August 1920 and has won three National Football League (later named as I-League) titles, eight Federation Cups, and three Indian Super Cups, alongside other trophies.

East Bengal the Real Power is a large active fan club of East Bengal. It cheers for the club in both home and away matches all around the country, and also makes banners and tifos on match-days.

East Bengal the Real Power has also backed the India national football team. In the 2022 FIFA World Cup Qualifier India vs Bangladesh match, they unfurled a huge tifo along with Blue Pilgrims and other fan clubs. Funding for the creation of the tifo was raised through crowdfunding; raising a total of ₹87,507 (US$910) from 274 donors.

== Centenary celebrations of East Bengal ==
Being the 100th year of East Bengal, the fan club organised rallies and other events. It started the centenary celebrations from the house of Suresh Chandra Chowdhury (one of the founders of the club) on 23 August 2019 by lighting 100 candles and procession.

EBRP along with Bengal Heritage Foundation and London Sharad Utsav hoisted club flags in 50 Indian cities and 50 other cities around the globe, to commemorate the club's centenary. In every city, a prominent landmark was chosen to hoist the flag. On 4 August at 12:00 hours (local time of respective cities), as soon as the flag was hoisted in the club, all the hundred flags were hoisted, starting from Dhaka and ending in Tokyo, by supporters, former players and former coaches, like Chima Okorie in England, Douglas Silva in Brazil, Suleh Musah in Ghana, Phillip Ridder in Belgium.

Exhibition derby matches, between East Bengal fans and Mohun Bagan fans, were organised in Slough, UK. Each side was subdivided into 3 teams and played against each other in a round-robin format. The tournament was attended by Chima Okorie.

== Football Fest ==
Started in 2014, it is one of the biggest events organised by the fan club every year. It generally happens in New Town's NKDA Stadium. Around 98 footballers with 8 teams participate in the tournament. In 2020 an exhibition match was also held for U-17 women and the visually impaired.

Some famous footballers and personalities are invited every year as ambassadors in the fest. Former and current players and staff are also invited in the event.

== Coronavirus and Amphan aid ==
The fan club came forward to ease the livelihood of people hit by the nation-wide lockdown due to the ongoing coronavirus pandemic. They donated money and essential items like food grains and toiletries to two ardent East Bengal supporters. They also raised and donated money to the Government relief funds.

South 24 Parganas district of West Bengal was badly hit due to Cyclone Amphan. EBRP along with Narendrapur Ramkrishna Mission started a campaign called "CTRL + Z Bengal" (which refers to reverting the current situation of the state to the previous one), in Garankati village, where they fed around 500 people.

=== Other initiatives ===
The fan club has taken up various initiatives in and around the city since its formation. It organises blood donation and health checkup camps every year; Bhai Phota and Raksha Bandhan with players; best fan's player of the month award. EBRP was part of the 10th anniversary celebration of the club's 2003 ASEAN Club Championship with the winning squad. It raised funds for the club and for treatment of an injured supporter It helps the fans and the club during match-days, organises various social activities and events. It also runs a U19 football coaching camp at Sodepur, Panshila.

== Protest ==
EBRP along with East Bengal Ultras and other fan clubs staged a pre-planned protest on 21 July 2021, against the club management for not signing the final contract with the investor, Shree Cement. The group alleged that their founder, Rabi Shankar Sen and some fans had received death threats for planning the protest. Team head coach and Liverpool legend, Robbie Fowler reacted, “Disgraceful but honestly not surprised” on Twitter.

== See also ==
- Kolkata Derby
- Football in India
