= Manjappada =

Kerala Blasters FC supporters' group

- Nickname: The 12th Man
- Abbreviation: MJPD
- Established: 27 May 2014; 12 years ago
- Type: Supporters' group, Ultras
- Club: Kerala Blasters FC
- Location: Kerala, India
- Stadium: Jawaharlal Nehru Stadium, Kochi
- Stand: East Gallery
- Colours
- Website: manjappada.in

Manjappada Polo T-shirt

Manjappada (transl. Yellow Army; Malayalam: [mɐɲːɐpːɐɖɐ]) is an organised supporters' group of the Kochi-based professional football club Kerala Blasters FC, which competes in the Indian Super League, the top-tier league of Indian football. One of the largest and most active sports fan groups in the country, Manjappada received the Indian Sports Honours Fan Club of the Year award three times, in 2017, 2019 and 2024.

Founded in 2014 as a Facebook page, Manjappada later expanded and have branches in each of Kerala's 14 districts and in 17 other Indian states; Keralites in 71 other countries are also part of the group. Manjappada is also known for having one of the largest groups of travelling fans in the country, and their presence in the stadium is often called a yellow sea as they wear as much yellow as possible during the matches of the Blasters. In the 2022–23 Indian Super League season, they displayed a 11752 sq ft tifo, which is now far the second largest tifo displayed during a football match in Asia.

The group has also been supporting the India national football team in matches at home and abroad. They were recognised by the Asian Football Confederation for their support of the Indian team at the 2019 AFC Asian Cup in the United Arab Emirates. Manjappada is also known for their engagement in activities other than supporting the Blasters. Since 2022, the group have developed a rivalry with the supporters group of Bengaluru FC, West Block Blues.

== History ==
Manjappada, which means Yellow Army, was founded on 27 May 2014 with a Facebook page created by three fans. Kerala Blasters had an average attendance of 49,000 during the inaugural season of the Indian Super League. By 2015, Manjappada began to co-ordinate more fans. The group played an important role, supporting Kerala Blasters during the 2015 Indian Super League season despite the club's poor performance. During that season, the Blasters recorded an average attendance of 52,000: the highest in Indian Super League (ISL) history. Most of their games had an attendance of over 60,000.

By 2016, Manjappada became better organised; they expanded through a WhatsApp group which initially consisted of 50 members. Fans throughout Kerala were connected with WhatsApp and branches were established in all the 14 districts of Kerala by 2020. Later the group started expanding outside of Kerala which led to the founding of 17 states chapters across India. Keralites in 64 other countries also became active in the fan club's international groups. Manjappada also have one of India's largest travelling fan bases. Manjappada have a women's group, with members of various ages. The idea originated in early 2016, with the intention of developing football culture in the women in Kerala and eventually, the first WhatsApp group was formed in 2018. Around the same time, Manjappada had evolved into an ultras group and began using flares and smoke during matches. In October 2019, Manjappada coordinated and brought forty-one busloads of their fans across Kerala to the venue of 2019–20 season opener match. In 2020, It was announced that the 2020–21 ISL season would be played at three empty stadiums in Goa due to the COVID-19 pandemic. To maintain enthusiasm, Manjappada distributed about 2,500 yellow flags to members and hung about 600 banners throughout Kerala before the season began. In December 2020, Manjappada released a musical album called 'Padayani' to motivate Kerala Blasters. The album picturises the empty stands of Jawaharlal Nehru stadium during the COVID-19 pandemic and the pain that has caused the fans. In May 2022, Manjappada was featured in a forty-minute documentary titled "Maitanam" (Ground), released on FIFA+, which showcases Kerala's passion for football.

== Culture ==
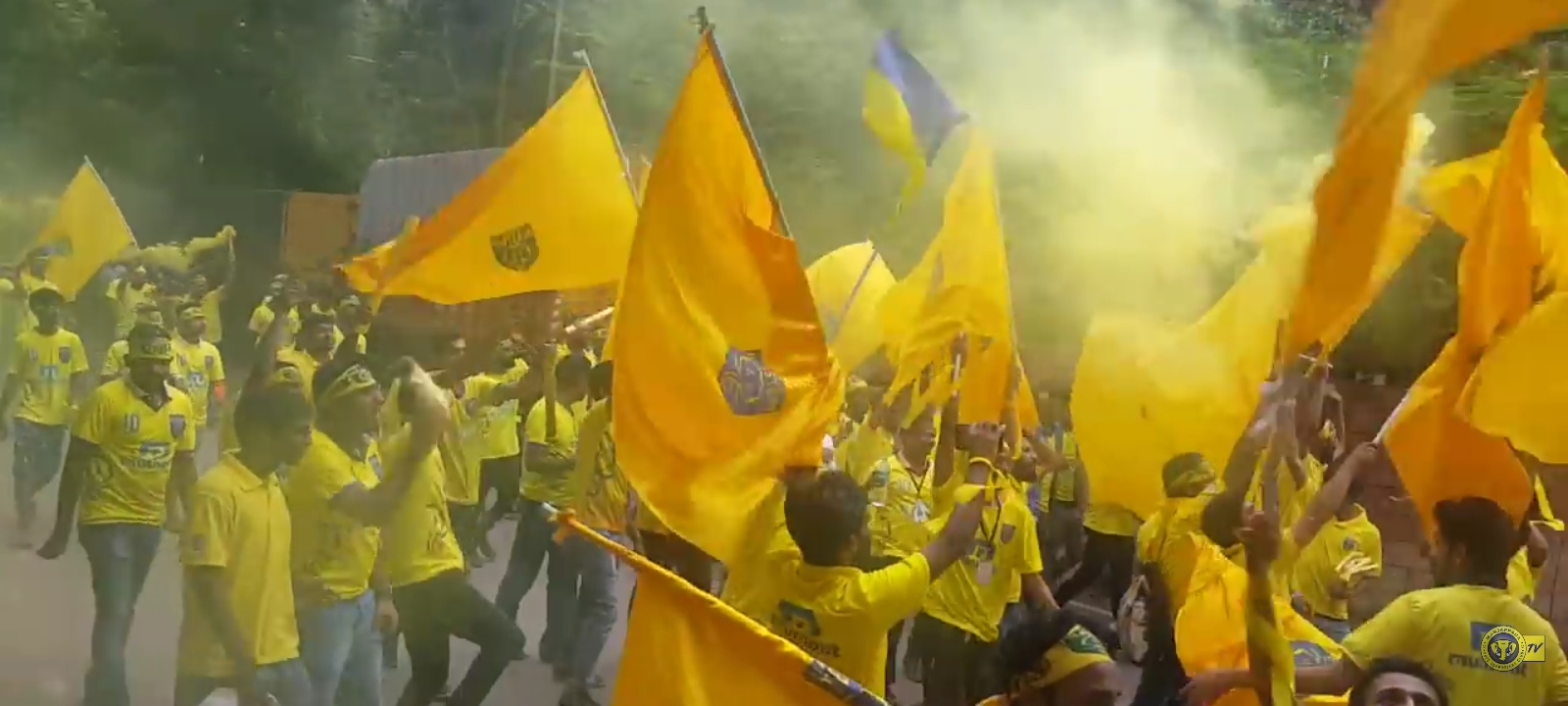
Manjappada roadshow on a matchday at the Marina Arena in Chennai

From the third season onwards, the East Gallery of the Jawaharlal Nehru Stadium came to be known as the "Manjappada stand", because the Manjappada members occupy it during the club's home games. The group wear as much yellow as possible during all the games which includes scarves and flags. Members begin their preparations almost a month before the season starts, with branches meeting to plan the group's major activities. Activities begin with welcoming the team at the airport. The group often conduct roadshows during important away matches. Before each match, members arrive at the stadium early and set up tifos, banners, and balloons. Manjappada have members who coordinate the group's waves, flashlights and Viking claps. In 2017, the group cleaned the stadium after a match and started a campaign in 2018 to clean the stadium after each game. They released their theme song around that time, written by Manu Manjith and composed by Manjappada member Nikhil Thomas. The song was performed by Shabareesh Varma. Thanks to the Kerala Gulf diaspora, Manjappada members are present wherever the Blasters play; in September 2019, when the Blasters played a pre-season friendly against Dibba FC in Dubai, a large number of Manjappada members supported the team. Players and coaches, acknowledging their support, refer to them as "The 12th Man".

== Chants and tifos ==
=== Chants ===
Dale Dale Dale Ohh, to the land of football, is to where God came. He gave us a club, gave it life, gave us hope. We are the famous, Kerala Blasters. Let's come together for the fight, to win it!

— Official Manjappada anthem

Manjappada's official anthem was released in August 2017 before the start of 2017–18 Indian Super League. The anthem, which was released on the group's official YouTube channel had inspirational clips from the previous seasons.

Apart from their official anthem, Manjappada have a chant specially dedicated to their club in the local language, Malayalam, which goes as "Niram Manjayaane" (The colour is yellow). The group also have chants specially dedicated to the players.

=== Tifos ===
Manjappada has displayed various tifos during the matches. One of their best-known tifo was displayed during the 2018–19 season opener against Mumbai City on 5 October 2018; reading "In Unity Lies Our Greatness", it was a tribute to fishermen who saved thousands of lives during the 2018 Kerala floods. Manjappada unveiled another tifo, reading "Rise Like A Phoenix", during the Blasters' season opener against ATK on 20 October 2019.

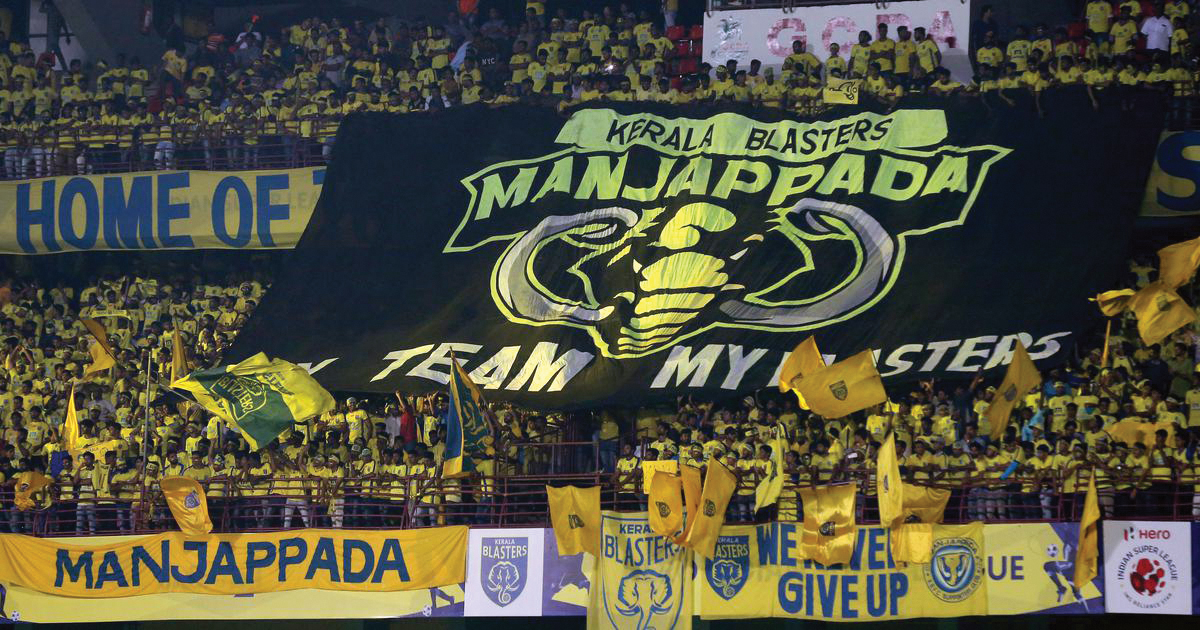
Manjappada displaying a tifo and banners at a match against Bengaluru FC

During the Southern Derby against Bengaluru FC on 11 December 2022, Manjappada displayed the then largest tifo in Asia and Indian football history, showing the concept that "football is for everyone". It was a 103 metre long tifo with a total area of 11752 sq ft.

== Rivalry with West Block Blues ==
They developed a rivalry with the West Block Blues, the supporters' group of Bengaluru FC, before the Blasters and Bengaluru played against each other. The rivalry began in 2017, the first Indian football rivalry before the clubs had played against each other. Bengaluru FC joined the Indian Super League in a league expansion that year, and it was announced that C. K. Vineeth (who had played for Kerala Blasters in 2016 on loan from Bengaluru) would sign permanently with the Blasters. Another Bengaluru loan, Rino Anto, was also signed by the Blasters as a result of the 2017–18 Indian Super League Players Draft. On 23 August 2017, Bengaluru played at home against North Korean side April 25 SC in the first leg of the Inter-zone AFC Cup. Both Vineeth and Anto were at Sree Kanteerava Stadium for the game. The West Block Blues began chanting for Vineeth and Rino Anto, acknowledging their contributions to Bengaluru. A group of West Block Blues also began an abusive chant against Kerala Blasters. "What happened has happened and I can only wish it won't happen again", Rino posted about the incident on social media, provoking Manjappada and beginning a social-media dispute between the groups. Manjappada members accused Bengaluru FC in November 2017 of blocking Kanteerava Stadium's East Upper Stand to prevent the group from supporting their team, increasing tensions and bantering between the groups. The clubs played against each other on 31 December 2017; matches since then between the Blasters and Bengaluru, in what is known as the South Indian Derby, are some of the league's most anticipated.

== Other activities ==
Manjappada is also involved in a number of other activities. In July 2018, they initiated a "Save the Kochi turf" campaign to preserve the FIFA-approved football pitch at Jawaharlal Nehru Stadium. During the 2018 Kerala floods, the group supplied relief materials to flood-affected areas. That year, they honoured the Indian Blind Football team. In 2018, Manjappada's Delhi branch organised the local Manjappada Dilli Soccer League. The following year, they began a "stop cyber abuse" campaign against the online abuse of footballers. In February 2020, Manjappada announced a partnership with the Delhi Senior Division's Delhi City FC. The club, now known as Manjappada Delhi City FC, is operated and managed by the group. In May 2020, Manjappada organised a Pro Evolution Soccer tournament in return for donations to the Chief Minister's Distress Relief Fund or the PM Cares fund. Manjappada have a blood-donors forum in each branch which encourages blood donation. On 1 November 2021, ahead of the 2021–22 season, Manjappada announced that for every goal scored by the Blasters in the season, they would plant tree saplings in each of the fourteen districts of Kerala.

=== Support for Indian National Team ===
Manjappada also supports the India national football team. When the Indian team plays outside India, Manjappada are often seen supporting the Indian team. In 2017, they successfully promoted their own campaign to get people to buy tickets and watch Indian under-17 team at the U-17 World Cup in Delhi. In 2019, India coach Igor Štimac noted about Manjappada's enthusiasm at home and abroad.

== Controversy ==
In February 2019, Kerala Blasters player C. K. Vineeth filed a complaint against a Manjappada member for spreading false information. Vineeth said a WhatsApp voice message accused him of shouting at a ball boy during a match against Chennaiyin in Kochi: "The fans have been behaving like this way for far too long. They have been rude against all players, especially Kerala players". Responding to Vineeth's complaint, Manjappada said that the opinions expressed in the WhatsApp voice message are those of a fan and do not reflect the views of the group: "Not everyone who comes to the stadium is part of Manjappada. Not everyone's opinion is our opinion. Vineeth could have said that certain Kerala Blasters fans turned on him but he named Manjappada ... Any comments or statements made by an individual should not be considered as the voice of Manjappada. All our views and statements will only be made public through our official social media handles. Manjappada should not be held accountable for any remarks made by an individual on our platform". This sparked the group's "Stop Cyber Abuse" campaign in July of that year.

== Awards and recognition ==
In 2017, Manjappada won the 'Fan Club of the Year' award at the inaugural Indian Sports Honours. The event was an initiative aimed at honouring sports-related persons and groups for their outstanding achievements. The group won the award for the second time in 2019. In 2019, the Asian Football Confederation honoured Manjappada with a Recognition Award for their support of the Indian national team and the 2019 AFC Asian Cup.

=== Honours ===
Indian Sports Honours
Fan Club Of The Year (3): 2017, 2019, 2024
Asian Football Confederation
Special Recognition Award: 2019
