= Viking Thunder Clap =

Football chant

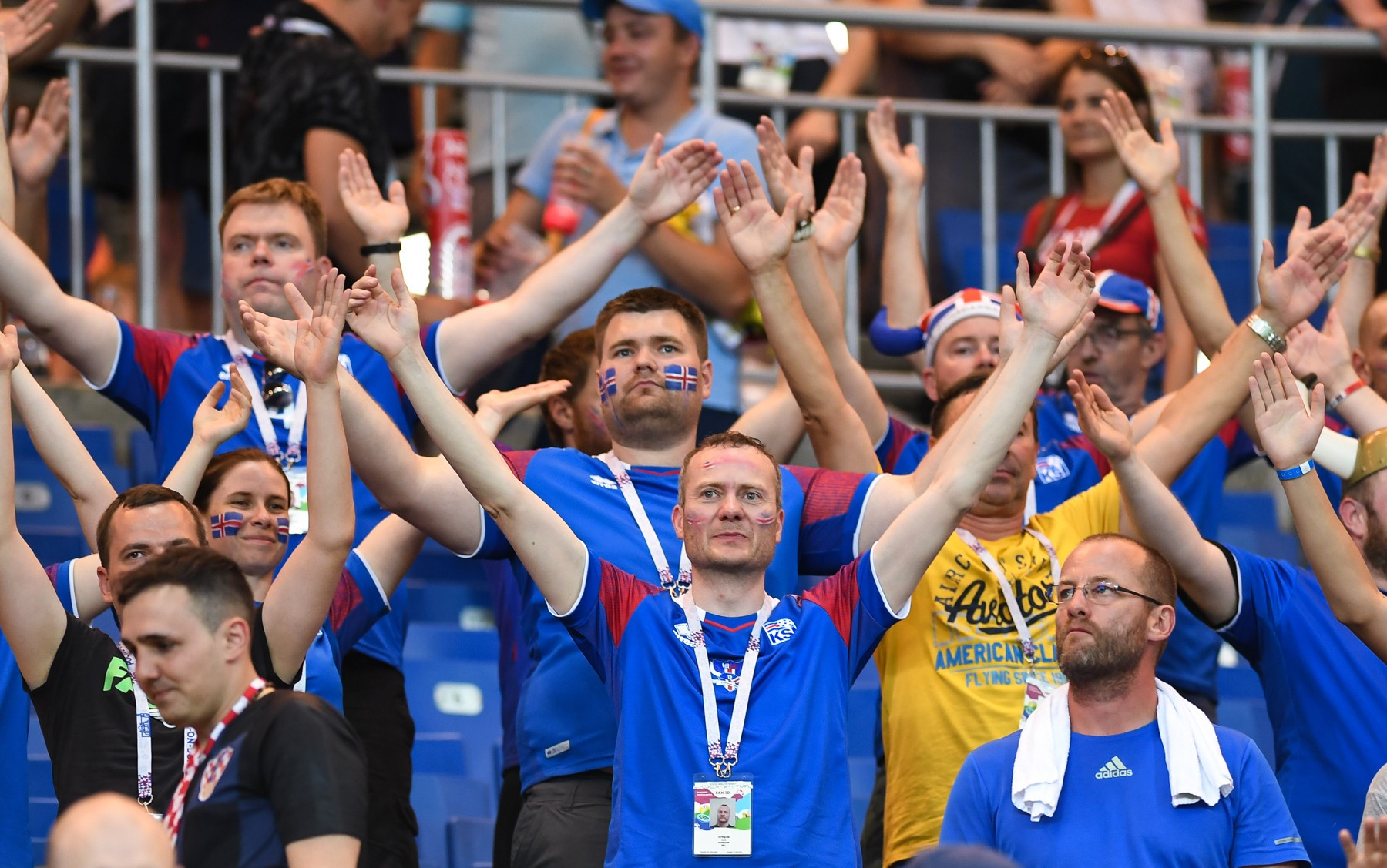
'Viking clapping' of Iceland fans

The Viking Thunder Clap or Viking Clap is a football chant, consisting of a loud shout and a clap in unison, which is then repeated initially several seconds later and gradually speeding up over time. The chant has been performed by fans of a number of clubs, but came to prominence during the UEFA Euro 2016, when fans of Iceland national team introduced their 'viking clap' or 'volcano clap' with a 'huh' chant.

During the 2018 FIFA World Cup when Iceland were one of the participating teams, the clap once again drew attention. The Viking Thunder Clap has been adopted by fans of many countries worldwide.

== Origin ==
The chant may have been inspired by the film 300 released in 2006. Some believed the chant was first used by fans of Scottish club Motherwell, while others suggest it had been performed by fans of the French club Lens more than two decades prior. Since the mid '90s, fans of the Greek side PAOK have been practising a pre-game ritual of chanting "PAOK" on the clap of hands.

Styrmir Gislason, the head of the Association of Icelandic Football Fans stated that the chant was inspired by Polish handball chants. During the UEFA Euro 2016, Iceland performed unexpectedly well and reached the quarter-finals, and the performance of the chant by their fans drew the attention of other European fans, who then also performed the chant. It has since been adopted by fans in many countries worldwide.

== Other teams ==
Viking clapping of Esteghlal fans in the match against Shahr Khodro, 9 May 2022

Fans of the following teams regularly perform versions of the viking clap:

- Esteghlal fans performed the Viking clap immediately after the end of the UEFA Euro 2016; With each clap, they call their team nickname "S.S".
- Persepolis supporters began using the Viking clap immediately since Branko Era.
- Canberra Raiders fans began using the chant in 2016 after the Icelandic version came to prominence.
- Carolina Hurricanes perform a variant called "The Storm Surge."
- India national football team have started using the viking clap since Blue Pilgrims was formed. It was used by the India national team during both the 2019 AFC Asian Cup and 2022 FIFA World Cup qualification (AFC).
- Minnesota Vikings chant 'skol' rather than the 'huh' since 2016.
- Seattle Sounders perform a variant called "Boom, Boom, Clap" dating to before the club was reformed in 2009, chanting 'hey' rather than 'huh'.
- Toronto fans have performed the "Boom, Boom, Clap" chant since 2008.
- The "Boom, Boom, Clap" chant has been performed by fans of Atlanta United since the club's inception in 2017, chanting the letters 'A–T–L' in succession on each clap.
- Seattle's variation of the "Boom, Boom, Clap" began being used by fans of the United States men's national soccer team following its introduction during a 2014 FIFA World Cup qualifier against Panama in Seattle. Eventually, the letters 'U–S–A' replaced 'hey' as the chant, echoing Atlanta's version.
- Cruzeiro fans started performing the 'Viking Clap' after each home game finish since 2022, becoming a recurrent chant of the crowd in the following years.; before that, Cruzeiro used a variant of the Iceland first-team jersey as their second uniform throughout the year of 2018.
- Vancouver Canucks used the 'Viking clap' at the final career home game for now-retired Swedish twins Daniel and Henrik Sedin on April 5, 2018.
- Bolton Wanderers fans started doing it in 2022 to show support for their new Icelandic striker Jón Daði Böðvarsson.
- Kerala Blasters fans began using the Viking clap since 2017 after its popularity reached in India.
- The Ottawa Charge of the PWHL have performed the Thunder Clap storm surge with their fans at both the TD Place and Canadian Tire Centre following wins since their inaugural season in 2024.
- The Norway national football team and their fans went viral during the 2026 FIFA World Cup performing a variant known as the Viking row. The Storting also participated in the chant as well.
- The Portland Hearts of Pine perform the clap at the start of the first and second halves, chanting "Hearts" after each clap.
