= Bangal =

Bengali people of Eastern Bengal

বাঙাল

Regions with significant populations
- East Bengal (present-day Bangladesh); Tripura; Barak Valley; West Bengal, India; migration after 1947 Partition

Languages
- Vanga and Varendri dialects of Bengali; Sylheti, Chittagonian, Noakhali

Related ethnic groups
- Ghotis, other Bengalis

Bangal or Bangaal (Bengali: বাঙ্গাল; a.k.a. Purbô Bôngiyô; transl. East Bengali) is a term used to refer to the Bengali people of Eastern Bengal now in Bangladesh, especially from the regions of Greater Khulna, Greater Barisal, Greater Faridpur, Greater Dhaka, Greater Jessore, Greater Noakhali, Greater Sylhet, Greater Mymensingh, Greater Comilla, Greater Chittagong, Tripura and Barak Valley. The term is used to describe Bengalis from the east, as opposed to the Ghotis of western Delta, and Rarh region in Western Bengal, and Jharkhand of modern India. It is usually assumed that the Bramhaputra-Padma river system is the demarcation line between the Western and Eastern wings of the Bengal region. The areas to the east of the Bramhaputra-Padma system are traditionally held to be the homeland of the Bangal people.

== Overview ==
Going by the more strict definition, the Bangals are those people whose ancestry is connected to the Eastern Bengal plains of Khulna, Jessore, Barisal, Dhaka, Rajshahi, Mymensingh, Comilla and Noakhali. Further, some opinions exist that among the East Bengal Plains origin people, only people belonging to the more affluent economic groups should be classified as Bangal. Going by this opinion, the designation Bangal has an ethno-geographic as well as a social connotation.

Some of the people from East Bengal, mainly Hindus, migrated to West Bengal during the Partition of India in 1947. These refugees were sometimes referred to as Bangals by the native population of West Bengal. As such, the terms Ghoti and Bangal are mostly used in West Bengal while in Bangladesh, the usage of these is rare except in regions with relatively high concentrations of immigrants from West Bengal. In modern times, amongst Bengalis, "Bangal" and "Ghoti" are used as social sub-groups. Those whose families came from East Bengal at the time of Partition are Bangals and those whose families were staying in West Bengal at that time are Ghotis. Similarly, the people who came to West Bengal from East Bengal before the Independence of India in1947 are also referred as Ghotis by native population as they were staying in West Bengal, India, at the time of Independence. The term as used here has little relation to actual geography since most members of these groups all now live in India. Historically, in addition to marrying within their castes, people from these groups also preferred to marry within the group, whether Bangal or Ghoti. Bangals and Ghotis keep up their cultural rivalry through their respective support of the football clubs East Bengal (Bangals) and Mohun Bagan (Ghotis). They also cherish a rivalry through a claim of the supremacy of their respective cuisines and especially river-food delicacies, i. e., Chingri (prawn) for Ghotis and Ilish (hilsa) for Bangals.

== See also ==
- Bengali language
- Eastern Bengali
- East Bengal
- Partition of Bengal (1947)
