= Tifo =

Sporting-fan behaviour

A card display mosaic tifo by fans of Polish team Wisła Kraków

Tifo (Italian: [ˈtiːfo]) is the phenomenon whereby the fans — or tifosi — of a sports team make a visual display of any choreographed flag, sign, or banner in the stands of a stadium, mostly as part of an association football match, although it expanded to include other sports, for example cycling, Formula One, and ice hockey. Tifo are most commonly seen in important matches, local derbies, and rivalries, and although the tradition originated at football club teams, some national teams also have fans that organise tifo on a regular basis. Sometimes sponsored or arranged by the club itself, tifo is primarily arranged by ultras or a supporter club to show their love to the club.

== Etymology ==
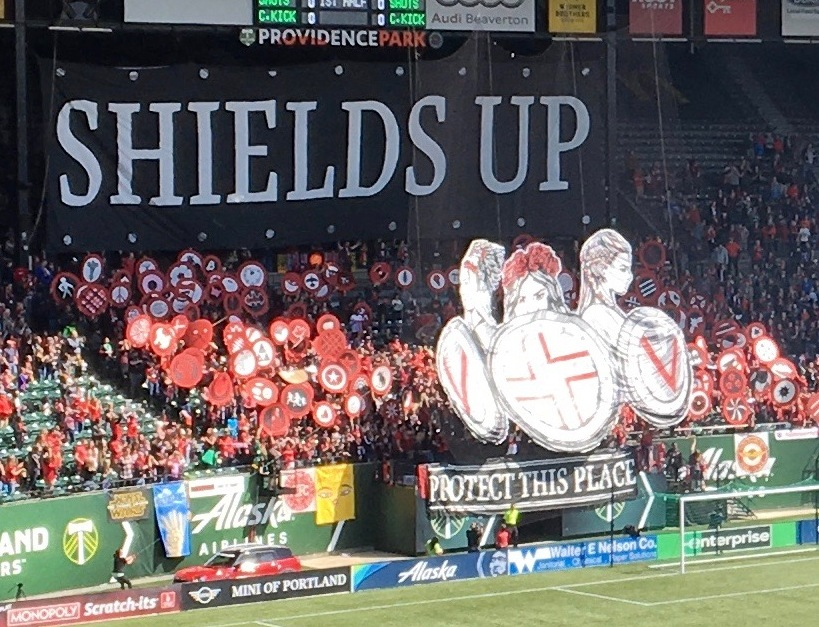
A tifo combining held shields and multiple hoisted painted banners at Providence Park in Portland, Oregon, U.S.

The plural tifosi is used for a mixed sex or an all-male group; masculine singular is tifoso, feminine singular tifosa, feminine plural tifose. Tifosi (pronounced [tiˈfoːzi; -oːsi]) is a fandom, or group of supporters of a sports team, especially those that make up a tifo. The term is derived from Italian tifoso, meaning "typhus or typhoid patient" (the two illnesses were often confused, and both were called tifo in Italy), referring to the "fevered" behaviour of the most dedicated fans. The Times of Malta observed that the English term "fan" sounds similarly odd to Italian ears, as to them fanatico usually is only used in the context of religious fanaticism.

Journalist Birgit Schönau traces the term tifosi back to the 1920s, a time when football fever was spreading in Italy and typhoid fever was also still prevalent in the poorer parts of the country.

An alternative explanation links it to Greek τῦφος (typhos, "smoke"), which is also related etymologically to the disease, though historian John Foot states that a derivation from the disease is more plausible.

== History ==
The tifo culture, like the origin of its name, has its roots in Italy and Southern Europe, and has a strong presence in Eastern Europe. It has much in common with the ultras culture and appeared at the same time, in the late 1960s and early 1970s. Tifo, while highly prevalent in Europe, has become more widespread and more common in all parts of the world where association football is played. It gained popularity in the late 2000s and early 2010s among Major League Soccer teams in the United States, with some supporters' groups spending up to $10,000 for materials. The Portland Timbers–Seattle Sounders rivalry has featured some of the largest and most elaborate tifos in U.S. soccer.

== Examples ==
=== Football ===
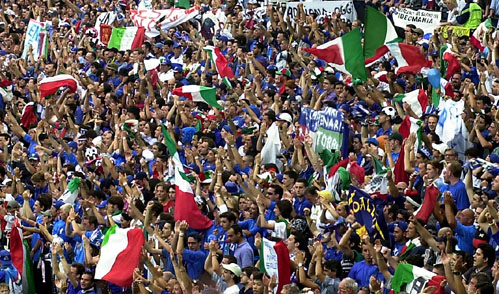
Tifosi of the Italy national football team during the UEFA Euro 2000

Tifosi is mainly used to describe fans of clubs in football. Apart from the many local fan clubs in Italy, whose main role is for example to provide a meeting place for fans and friends and organize away trips, since the late 1960s, many Italian fans rely on organized stadium groups known as ultras. The main goal is to choreograph fan support with flags, banners, coloured smoke screens, flares, drums, and chanting in unison. For most teams city rivalries, colours, coat of arms, symbols, and the overall iconography have roots in the Middle Ages and early Renaissance. A fictional depiction of a tifoso in football is shown in Tifosi, an Italian film released in 1999.

=== Cycling ===
The word is commonly used to describe fans along the roadside at professional road cycling races in Italy such as Tirreno–Adriatico, Milan–San Remo, the Giro d'Italia, and the Giro di Lombardia. Passionate supporters of Italian cycling teams and cyclists are called "the tifosi".

=== Formula One ===
The tifosi at the 2003 Italian Grand Prix

It has become common to use the word tifosi to refer to the supporters of Scuderia Ferrari in Formula One. Italian motor racing fans are well known for their love of Ferrari, although they have also been staunch supporters of other Italian cars such as Maserati, Lancia, and Alfa Romeo. The tifosi provide Formula One with a sea of red filling the grandstands at the Italian Grand Prix. One of the most common tifosi sights is the display of an enormous Ferrari flag in the grandstands during Formula One weekends at every race circuit, with especially large contingents showing up in Ferrari livery at home and nearby European tracks. A similar sight could be observed in former years during the San Marino Grand Prix, which was held at the Autodromo Enzo e Dino Ferrari near the town of Imola, 80 km (49.7 mi) east of the Ferrari factory in Maranello. The tifosi stuck by Ferrari during the struggles in the early 1990s, where Gerhard Berger and Jean Alesi each won one race, as the front-running teams were McLaren, Williams, and Benetton. The mid-1990s increase in the ranks of the tifosi can be directly traced to the arrival of Michael Schumacher who joined Ferrari in 1996, after winning two drivers' titles with Benetton, bringing over key personnel like Ross Brawn and Rory Byrne. Schumacher drove for Ferrari until his first retirement at the conclusion of the 2006 season, leading the team to six Constructors' Championship from 1999–2004 and personally winning five drivers' championships. When Ferrari's Charles Leclerc won the 2019 Italian Grand Prix, which was the first time for the team since 2010, a massive crowd of tifosi went to the podium to celebrate the victory.

As revealed by David Croft during the podium celebration, there is a strained relationship between the tifosi and Mercedes, who have won at the Monza Circuit from the start of the turbo hybrid era in 2014 to 2018; when a Mercedes driver (notably Lewis Hamilton) won the Italian Grand Prix, or made the podium, the tifosi would boo at the driver. In the 2020s, the tifosi have again shown appreciation for drivers outside Ferrari. After his thrilling win at Monza in 2025, Red Bull Racing driver Max Verstappen expressed delight at being "properly cheered" by the Italian fans, and observed that it was the first time he felt genuine support from the Ferrari faithful. Verstappen stated: "The entire straight was filled with people, this was the first time tifosi properly cheered for me! The last two times I won here, the competition was Ferrari, and they were a little less happy with it." Of note, the 2022 Italian Grand Prix was marred by reports of fan harassment against fans of Verstappen, and against members of Verstappen's family. At the 2026 Italian Grand Prix, which saw Italian driver Kimi Antonelli win for Mercedes, the tifo booed his teammate George Russell on the podium.

The tifosi in Italy have been known to actually cheer for a non-Italian driver in a Ferrari passing an Italian driver in another make of car. At the 1983 San Marino Grand Prix, the crowd at Imola cheered long and loud when Italian Riccardo Patrese crashed his Brabham out of the lead of the race only 6 laps from home, handing Frenchman Patrick Tambay the win in his Ferrari. Patrese himself had only passed Tambay for the lead half a lap earlier. One driver who never actually drove for Ferrari but is supported by the tifosi is Frenchman Jean-Louis Schlesser. He drove for the Williams team at the 1988 Italian Grand Prix at Monza substituting for an ill Nigel Mansell. On lap 49 of the 51 lap race, Schlesser was unwittingly involved in the incident at the Variante del Rettifilo chicane that took out the leading McLaren MP4/4 of Ayrton Senna, fittingly handing Ferrari's Gerhard Berger and Michele Alboreto an emotional 1–2 finish only a month after the death of Enzo Ferrari. Berger's win handed McLaren their only loss of the 16-race 1988 season. The Italian Kimi Antonelli was cheered on by the tifosi on his way to his first home victory.

=== Ice hockey ===
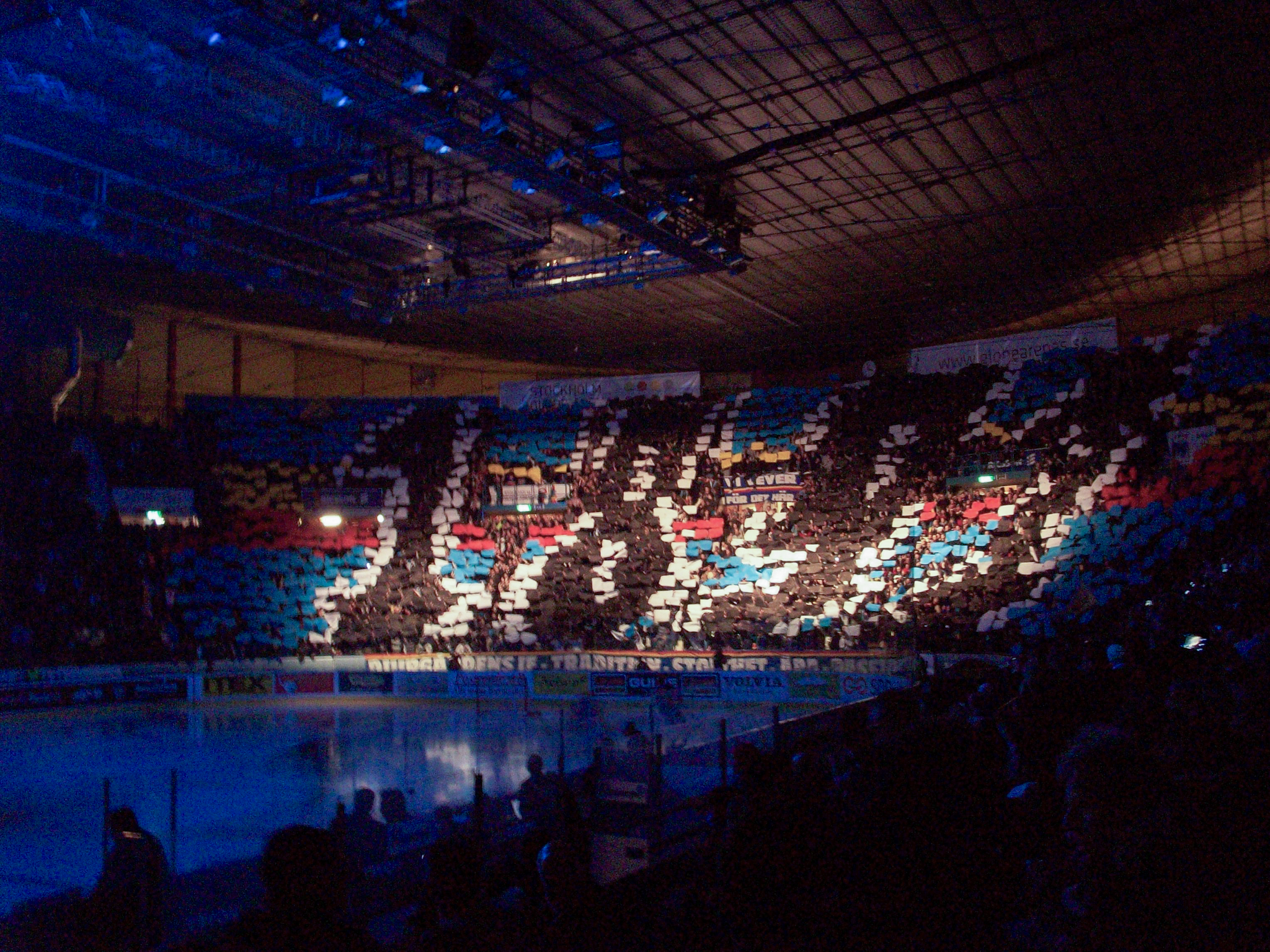
Tifo organized by Djurgårdens IF supporters at an ice hockey game

Tifos and choreographies have become increasingly popular in ice hockey around Europe in the 2000s along with ultras and hooligan culture with some of the biggest organized groups in Finland. Sweden, and Switzerland.

== See also ==
- Association football culture
- Card stunt
- Curva
- Football chants
- Oranjegekte, Dutch counterpart of Tifosi
- Ultras
