= Ultras =

Fanatical association football fans

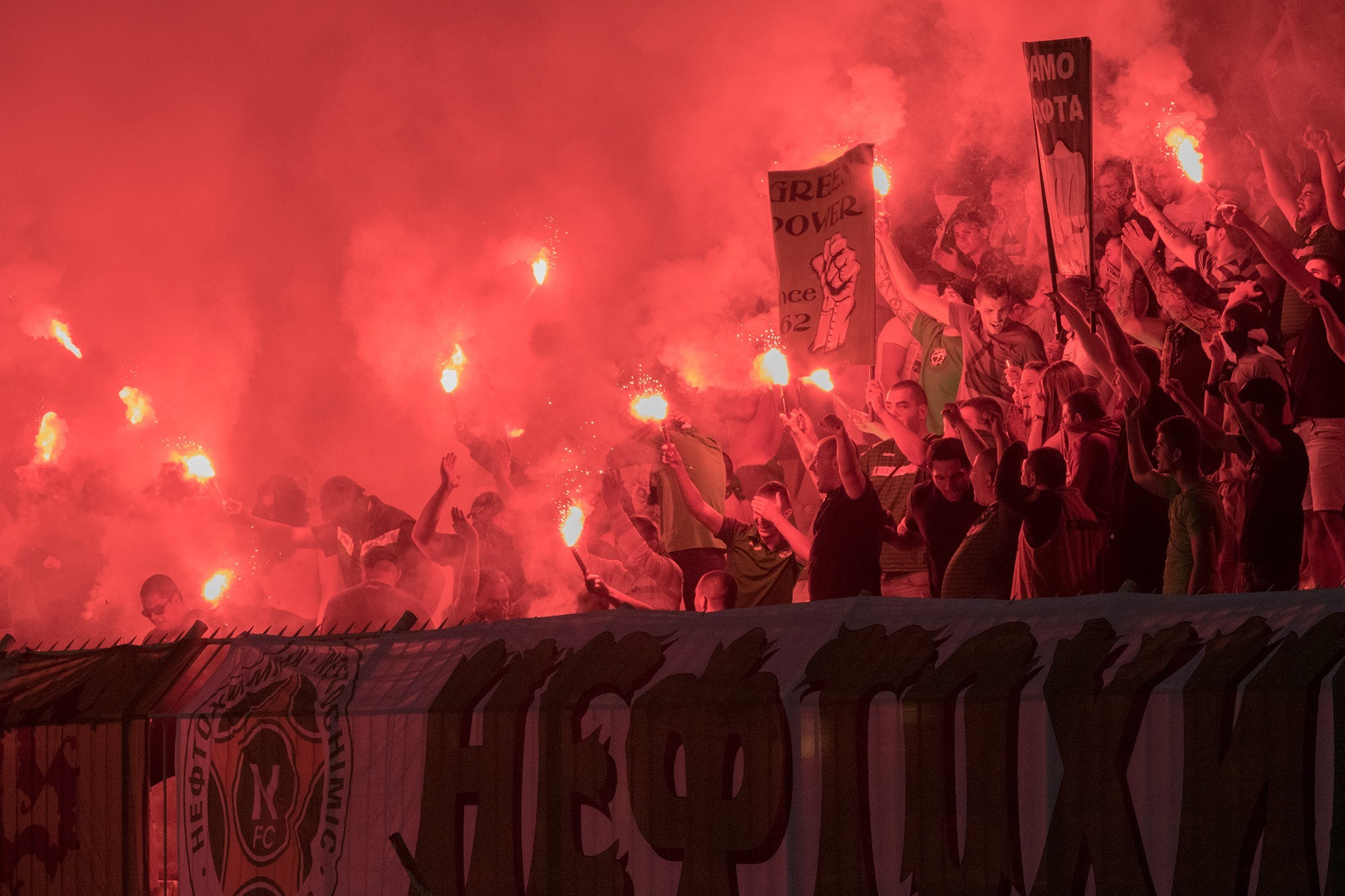
Ultras of KeNeftochimic Burgas at Mazut Stadium in Burgas, Bulgaria, 2014

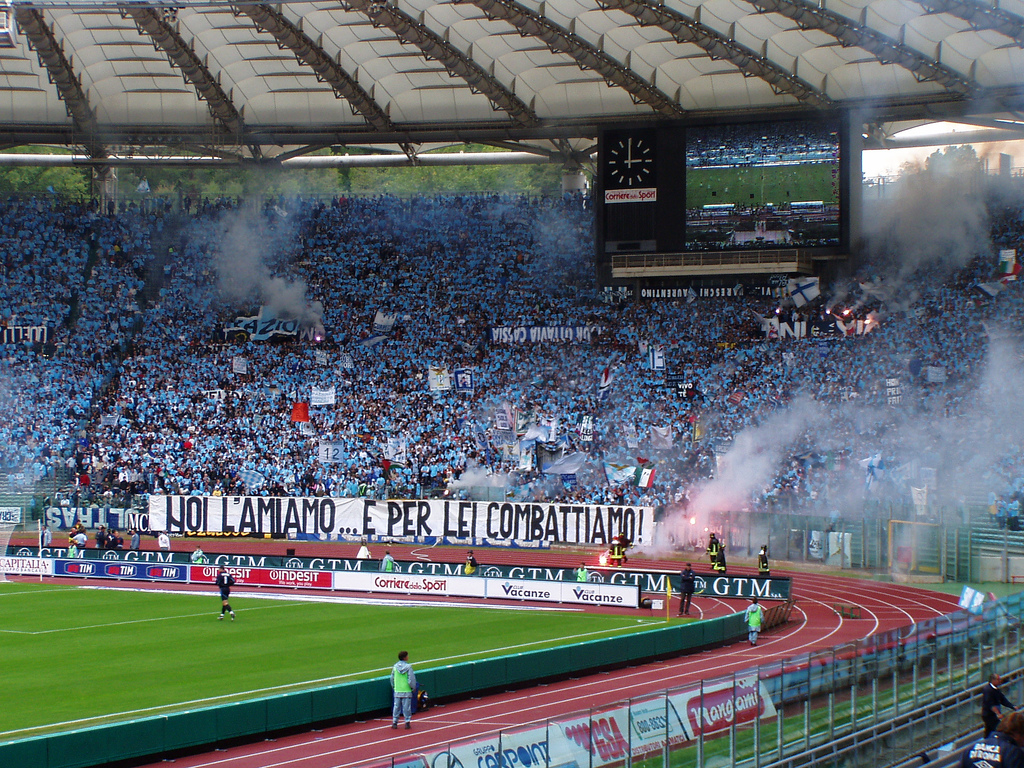
Ultras of Lazio at Olympic Stadium of Rome, Italy in 2007

Ultras are a type of association football fans who are known for their fanatical support. The term originated in Italy, but is used worldwide to describe predominantly organised fans of association football teams. The behavioural tendency of ultras groups includes singing football chants, playing musical instruments such as drums, their use of flares and smoke bombs (primarily in tifo choreography), frequent use of elaborate displays, vocal support in large groups and the displaying of flags and banners at football stadiums, all of which are designed to create an atmosphere which encourages their own team and intimidates the opposing players and their supporters. These groups also commonly organise trips to attend away games.

Ultras groups have been responsible for many cases of football hooliganism and violence, although differently from hooligan firms, ultras do not have the explicit objective of fighting other fans. Ultras groups are also in some cases directly linked to ideologies like neo-Nazism and other forms of far-right politics, and sometimes far-left politics. In some instances, hooliganism and/or this politicisation goes to the point where support for their team is relegated to a secondary feature of the phenomenon.

In recent decades, the culture has become a focal point for the movement against the commercialisation of sports and football in particular. Ultras also have regional variants and analogues, such as casuals in the United Kingdom, barra bravas in Hispanic America, and torcidas organizadas in Brazil.

== History ==
The origin of the ultras movement is disputed, with many supporters groups from various countries making claims solely on the basis of their dates of foundation. The level of dispute and confusion is aided by a contemporary tendency (mainly in Europe) to categorise all groups of overtly fanatical supporters as ultras. The first group of fans was found in Salerno, Italy in 1921 with the name "circolo salernitani fieri", later in Florence in 1931 when some Fiorentina fans created the group called "ordine del marzocco", which with a large following, composed hymns, distributed flags and stage material and set up special trains to follow the team. Supporters groups of a nature comparable to the ultras have been present in Brazil since 1939, when the first torcida organizada was formed (although these groups began to focus on violence in the 1970s). Inspired by the torcidas and the colourful scenes of the 1950 World Cup, supporters of Hajduk Split formed Torcida Split on 28 October 1950. The first supporters' groups in the world formed to produce violence were barras bravas, originated in Argentina in the 1950s.

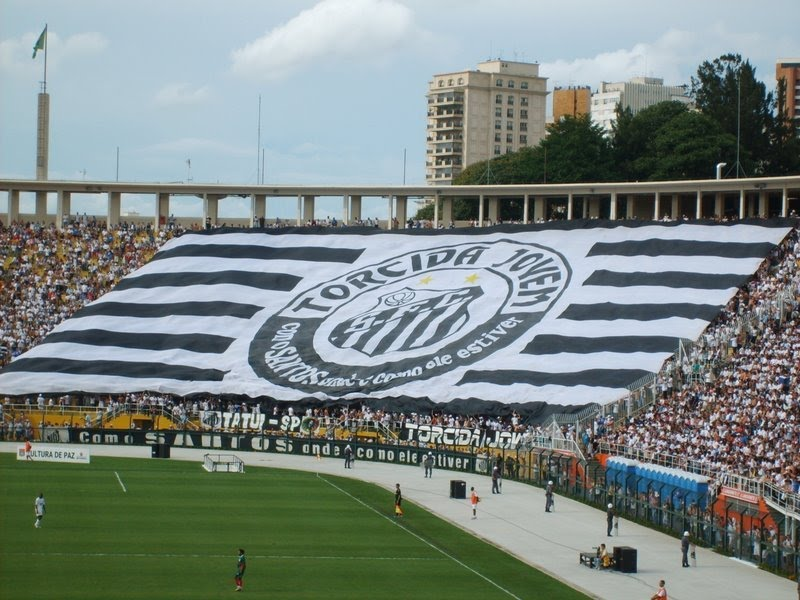
Torcida Jovem of Santos in Brazil. An example of a Brazilian Torcida Organizada

One country closely associated with the ultras movement is Italy. The first Italian ultras groups were formed in 1951, including the Fedelissimi Granata of Torino. The 1960s saw the continuing spread and development of the culture with the formation of the Fossa dei Leoni and Boys San groups, the former often regarded in Italy as the first full-fledged ultras group (associated with violence). The term "ultras" was used as a name for the first time in 1969, when supporters of Sampdoria formed the Ultras Tito Cucchiaroni and fans of Torino formed the Ultras Granata. The style of support that would become synonymous with Italian football developed most during the 1970s, as more groups formed, including the radical S.S. Lazio Ultras in 1974, with a strong predominance of fascist slogans and chants amongst other groups such as Hellas Verona supporters. The active support of the ultras became more apparent, in contrast with the "traditional" culture, choreographic displays, signature banners and symbols, giant flags, drums and fireworks became the norm as groups aimed to take their support to higher levels. The decade also saw the violence and unrest of Italian society at the time overlap with the ultras movement, adding a dimension that has plagued it ever since. The ultras movement spread across Europe, Australia, Asia and North Africa during the 1980s, 1990s and 2000s, starting with the countries geographically closest to Italy.

== Characteristics ==
Ultras groups are usually centred on a core group of founders or leaders (who tend to hold executive control), with smaller subgroups organised by location, friendship or political stance. Ultras tend to use various styles and sizes of banners and flags bearing the name and symbols of their group. Some ultras groups sell their own merchandise to raise funds for performing displays. An ultras group can number from a handful of fans to hundreds or thousands, with larger groups often claiming entire sections of a stadium for themselves. Ultras groups often have a representative who liaises with the club owners on a regular basis, mostly regarding tickets, seat allocations and storage facilities. Some clubs provide groups with cheaper tickets, storage rooms for flags and banners and early access to the stadium before matches to prepare displays. These types of favoured relationships are often criticised when ultras groups abuse their power.

=== Hooliganism ===
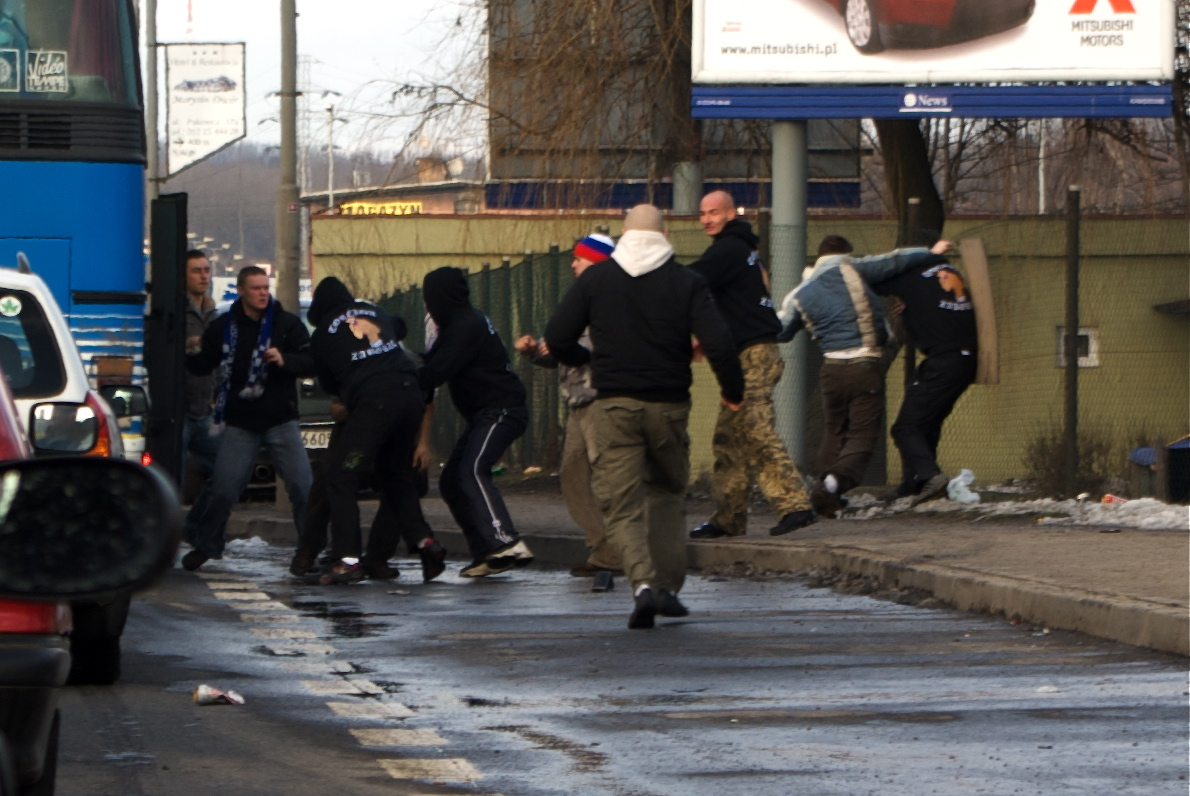
Polish football hooligans in violent clash

While ultras groups can become violent, the majority of matches attended by ultras conclude with no violent incidents. Unlike hooligan firms, whose main aim is to fight hooligans of other clubs, the main focus of ultras is generally to support their own team. Some hooligans try to be inconspicuous when they travel; usually not wearing team colours, to avoid detection by the police. Within the ultra or hooligan culture however, those dressing to "blend in" would be referred to as casuals, which is viewed by some as a branch of hooliganism, yet still maintaining its own independence and culture. Ultras tend to be more conspicuous when they travel, proudly displaying their scarves and club colours while arriving en masse, which allows the police to keep a close eye on their movements.

== Europe ==
=== France ===
| Stadium | Club | Name |
|---|---|---|
| Parc des Princes | Paris Saint-Germain | Collectif Ultras Paris |
| Stade Vélodrome | Olympique de Marseille | Commando Ultra '84; South Winners 1987; Fanatics 1988; Dodger's 1992; Marseille Trop Puissant 1994 |
| Stade Geoffroy-Guichard | AS Saint-Étienne | Magic Fans 1991; Green Angels 1992 |
| Groupama Stadium | Olympique Lyonnais | Bad Gones; Lyon 1950 |
| Allianz Riviera | OGC Nice | Ultras Populaire Sud Nice |
| Stade Pierre-Mauroy | Lille OSC | Dogues Virage Est |
| Stade de la Beaujoire | FC Nantes | Brigade Loire |
| Roazhon Park | Stade Rennais FC | Roazhon Celtic Kop |
| Stade Louis-II | AS Monaco | Ultras Monaco 1994 |
| Stade Gaston Gérard | Dijon FCO | Lingon's Boys |
| Nouveau Stade de Bordeaux | FC Girondins de Bordeaux | Ultramarines Bordeaux |
| Stade Bollaert-Delelis | RC Lens | Red Tigers; Kop Sang et Or |
| Stade de la Mosson | Montpellier HSC | Butte Paillade |
| Stade de la Meinau | RC Strasbourg Alsace | Ultra Boys 90 |
| Stade Saint-Symphorien | FC Metz | Horda Frénétik; Gruppa Metz |
| Stade de l'Abbé-Deschamps | AJ Auxerre | Ultras Auxerre 1990 |
| Stade Océane | Le Havre AC | Barbarians Havrais |
| Stade Marcel Picot | AS Nancy Lorraine | Saturday FC |
| Stade des Alpes | Grenoble Foot 38 | Red Kaos; Diables Bleus 07 |
| Stade Jean-Bouin (Paris) | Paris FC | Ultras Lutetia 2014 |
| Stade Marcel-Tribut | USL Dunkerque | Ultras Dunkerquois 2007 |

=== Germany ===
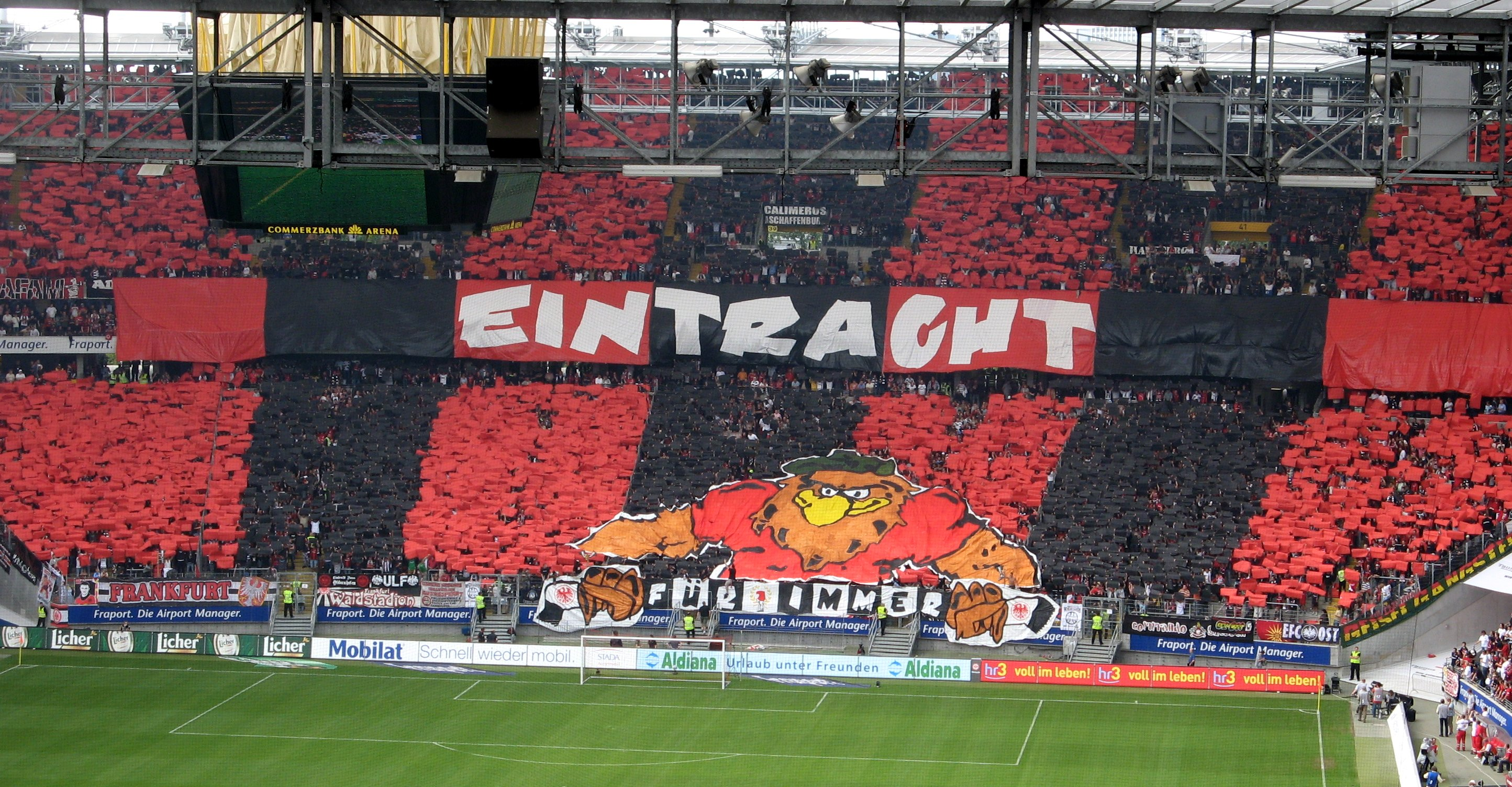
Choreography by Frankfurt's Ultra group UF97 at the season opener 2007–08

The "Fortuna Eagles Supporters" who are connected to SC Fortuna Köln, were founded in 1986. In 1989, another group was formed under the name "Soccer Boyz" (today: "Ultras Leverkusen"). They are associated with Bundesliga Leverkusen. In the 1990s, the Ultras movement grew steadily. With the turn of the millennium, many Ultra groups took responsibility in the stands to contribute to the atmosphere, superseding individual fans and unorganised groups.

The Ultra movement then spiked in the mid-2000s. Both individual memberships and the total number of groups increased drastically. The Ultras had now moved from a subculture to being mainstream. As a result of mixing with other subcultures such as hip-hop, punk, graffiti and street art, Ultra groups even collaborated with, and were referenced by artists in their work.

Due to rising numbers in membership changes developed and after a subcultural phase, which was partially political, Ultra groups have mostly become self-referential in the 2010s. There has also been a change in the way violence is viewed, leading to conflicts and separations even within groups. One example for the violent conflicts has happened at Alemannia Aachen where two different groups violently clashed at their home ground, the left-leaning "Aachen Ultras" and the right-wing "Karlsbande".

Nowadays, for almost all clubs of the three biggest German leagues, and for some in lower leagues, there are groups who identify as Ultras. In Germany, there are supposedly more than 25,000 Ultras organized in over 300 different groups.

==== Ultra-Movement against the DFB ====
As the rift between the Ultra groups and the German Football Association (Deutscher Fußball-Bund) continued to grow, the Ultra group of Dynamo Dresden symbolically proclaimed war against the DFB in May 2017. Around 2,000 of them, raged through Karlsruhe, lit fireworks, stormed the stadium and held up a banner with the inscription "War Against DFB". The Ultras of Dresden were heavily criticized for their martial behaviour, yet, the next match day over 30 other Ultra groups applauded them for their agenda.

In the 2000s, there already were nationwide campaigns by the German Ultra Movement. Following the ProFans campaign, the fan demonstration at the 2005 Confederations Cup, and several years of collaboration under the label "Zum Erhalt der Fankultur" (Preserving Fan Culture), in 2017 the Dresden initiative was seen as a new beginning for networking in Germany. A large number of Ultra groups sought dialogue in order to organize a joint protest. The meetings, which even took place between rival groups, were extremely rare in Germany until then. The Ultra groups agreed on issues such as the investigation of the so-called 2006 summer fairy tale, the end of match day fragmentation, fan-friendly kick-off times, the abolition of collective punishment, an end to corruption, the preservation of the 50+1 rule, transparency in the sports court, and an end to eventization.

Following these agreements, a similar protest against the association took place nationwide during the first round of the DFB-Pokal (German Cup) in August 2017. Across 28 Cup games, there were 32 demonstrations. Eventually, the pressure on the DFB became so great that in August 2017, they announced that they would refrain from issuing collective punishments until further notice and offered a "serious dialogue this time."

The first such dialogue took place between the association's leadership and approximately 30 representatives from various Ultra groups on 9 November 2017. Both parties agreed on a consensus, or at least a convergence, regarding promotion rules for the Regionalliga (regional league), kick-off times, permitted fan items, and stadium bans. On 1 June 2018, the DFB introduced Monday games for the 3rd league, which prompted the ultra groups to pull back from the dialogue.

Just one day prior, there had been a second meeting, during which the DFB did not reveal their plan. The fans considered the dialogue a failure and criticised that no improvements had been made. They accused the DFB of only having agreed to the dialogue for publicity.

=== United Kingdom ===
The UK was the birthplace of football hooliganism and casuals. The overwhelming dominance of these local football movements meant an 'ultras' subculture took much longer to develop. Severe anti-hooligan laws, heavy policing, undercover surveillance, and strict ground regulations heavily restricted the use of flares, tifos, banners, and drums. This growth was further delayed by mandatory all-seater stadiums following the 1989 Taylor Report, and expensive ticket prices that have locked out working class supporters since the 1990s. Eventually, British fans began establishing ultras groups, particularly from the mid-2010s onwards.

==== England ====
The Holmesdale Fanatics of Crystal Palace F.C. were one of the most prominent ultras groups in England. In late-2022, an Arsenal ultras group called the Ashburton Army gained prominence, taking their name from Ashburton Grove, the historic road upon which the team's Emirates Stadium was built. In April 2024, Aston Villa F.C. supporters formed the 1897 Group. Following the inception of the group and a subsequent meeting with club officials, the group were allocated a section of the club's home stadium Villa Park for a Premier League match against A.F.C. Bournemouth to launch the group's presence at Aston Villa's matches. The group's volunteers help to organise and carry out tifo displays in Villa Park's Holte End stand and across other sections of the stadium for Villa home matches. Other ultras-style supporters' groups have formed at clubs such as Middlesbrough F.C. (Red Faction), Newcastle United (Wor Flags), Colchester United known as the BWA (Blue and White Army), Hartlepool United known as the NWC (North West Corner), Bristol City (Section 82), Leicester City F.C. (Union FS), and Ipswich Town F.C. (Blue Action). Several non-League football teams have had ultras groups that are left-wing, such as Clapton F.C. (Clapton Ultras), Mangotsfield United (Inter Village Firm), and Dulwich Hamlet F.C. (The Rabble). The now-defunct British nationalist group Casuals United, an alliance of 50 hooligan firms, was in conflict with anti-fascist football ultras, and succeeded in getting many left-wing ultras groups banned from matches.

==== Scotland ====
The Green Brigade are an ultras group that follow Celtic F.C. who make tifo displays and voice support for a United Ireland and Palestinian nationalism. They describe themselves as left-wing. On the other side of Glasgow are the Rangers F.C. ultra group the Union Bears. The Union Bears are known for their elaborate fan displays and their support for Scottish unionism and Northern Irish unionism within the UK. They are described as being right-wing. They celebrate and support the Protestant history of both Rangers and Scotland. They sit in the Copland Road stand. Incidents of violence between the Union Bears and the Green Brigade are common. Ultras Aberdeen are the ultras group who follow Aberdeen F.C., they organise chants and choreography in the Merkland Road Stand, at Pittodrie Stadium, also known as the "Red Shed". Block Seven are a supporters group that support Hibernian F.C., while the Gorgie Ultras support rivals Heart of Midlothian F.C.. Northbank are the ultras group supporting St. Mirren, occupying a section of the west stand. The Southside Ultras support Queen's Park F.C., while the Partick Thistle Ultras support their city rivals, Partick Thistle. The Partick Thistle Ultras formed in 2021 when fans were not allowed inside stadiums during the COVID-19 pandemic. The group gathered at a nearby canal on the last day of the season as their team won the Scottish League One title, and celebrated with flares, flags, and singing. Other ultras in the Scottish Championship include Dunfermline Athletic's Section North West, Greenock Morton's Cowshed, Raith Rovers’ Ultras Raith, Livingston's Block C, Hamilton Academical's Accies Youth, Ayr United's Somerset Ragazzi, Falkirk's Ultras 1876 and Airdrieonians’ Section B.

==== Northern Ireland ====
The ultras scene in Northern Ireland is new, and since these have begun, the younger generation of fans in Northern Ireland has increased more than it has in many years.

| Club | Name |
|---|---|
| Glentoran F.C. | Glentoran Ultras |
| Linfield F.C. | Blue Unity |
| Cliftonville F.C. | Red Fanatics |
| Coleraine F.C. | Coleraine Casual Army |
| Larne F.C. | Casual Inver Army |

=== Switzerland ===
Most professional football clubs in Switzerland have ultras groups. Notable examples include Servette FC (Section Grenat), FC Basel (Muttenzerkurve), FC Zürich (Zürcher Südkurve), Grasshopper Club Zurich (Sektor IV), and BSC Young Boys (Ostkurve Bern). Other clubs with ultras groups include FC Luzern (USL), FC St. Gallen (Green Power, Saint Brothers, Bangor Maniacs, and Green Fires), FC Sion (Ultras Sion 1994 and Freaks Sion), FC Lugano (Curva Nord FC Lugano 1908), FC Thun (Red White Boys), FC Lausanne-Sport (Loz Boys, Triccards Lausanne, and their respective youth sections Loz Flaytes and Géneration Turbulante ), FC Winterthur (Taktlos Winterthur), FC Aarau (Szene Aarau), and Yverdon-Sport FC (Kop 14)

=== Austria ===
Many Austrian clubs have ultras groups supporting them, most notably SK Rapid, who had the first group in Austria in 1988, the "Ultras Rapid Block West 1988", who are still very active and are in control of most the so-called "Block West" in the Weststadion, together with groups like "Tornados", "Lords", "SAF 2012", "Lions" and others, creating the biggest ultras support among all Austrian clubs, at home and away as well. Other clubs like FK Austria Wien, Sturm Graz or SV Austria Salzburg are also known for their active supporting scene. Many ultras groups have active friendships with groups from friendly clubs, mostly from Germany, Italy, Greece and Hungary.

=== Hungary ===
Singing at sector B Central during the opening ceremonies of the Puskás Aréna on 15 November 2019

Several clubs in Hungary have large ultras groups, such as Ferencváros (Green Monsters), Újpest (Viola Fidelity), Diósgyőr (Ultras Diósgyőr), Honvéd (Ultras Kispest, Északi Kanyar), Fehérvár (Red Blue Devils), Tatabánya (Turul Ultrái), Debrecen (Szívtiprók Ultras Debrecen) and other strongly developing groups such as Kecskemét (Ultras Kecskemét) Szeged (Ultras Szeged). The national team of Hungary has an ultras group known as the Carpathian Brigade. The group was formed in 2009. Hungarian ultras occupy sector B Central at the Puskás Aréna.

=== Czech Republic ===
The ultras movement in the Czech Republic developed during the 1990s following the fall of communism, drawing influence from neighbouring Germany, Italy and Poland. Most professional football clubs in the Czech Republic have an ultras group.

| stadium | club | name |
|---|---|---|
| Stadion Letná | AC Sparta Prague | Letenští |
| Fortuna Arena | SK Slavia Prague | Tribuna Sever |
| Městský stadion (Ostrava) | FC Baník Ostrava | Chachaři |
| Doosan Arena | FC Viktoria Plzeň | Sektor-P |
| Městský fotbalový stadion Srbská | FC Zbrojovka Brno | Zbrojováci Johny Kentus Gang |
| Ďolíček | Bohemians Praha 1905 | Sektor 1905 Green White Fanatics |
| Andrův stadion | SK Sigma Olomouc | Ultras Sigma |
| Stadion Střelnice | FK Jablonec | Ultras Jablonec |
| Stadion u Nisy | FC Slovan Liberec | Chaotix Liberec |
| Městský stadion (Karviná) | MFK Karviná | Ultras Karviná |
| Malšovická aréna | FC Hradec Králové | Votroci 2000 |
| Na Stínadlech | FK Teplice | SEKTOR 15 |
| Stadion Letná | FC Zlín | Ultras Zlín 1919 |

=== Portugal ===
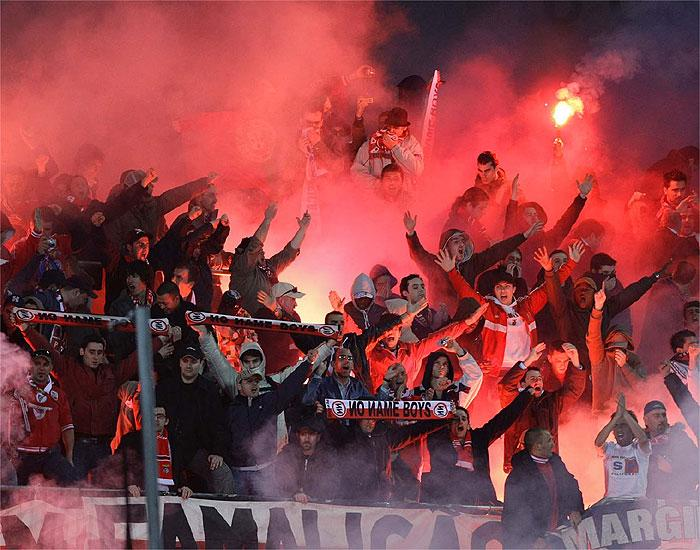
Benfica group, No Name Boys, Lisbon, 2008

| Stadium | Club | Name |
|---|---|---|
| Estádio do Dragão | FC Porto | Super Dragões 1986; Colectivo Ultras 95 |
| Estádio do Bessa | Boavista FC | Panteras Negras 84 |
| Estádio da Luz | SL Benfica | Иo Иame Boys 92 < Diabos Vermelhos 82 < Grupo Manks 96 |
| Estádio José Alvalade | Sporting CP | Juventude Leonina 1976; Torcida Verde; Directivo Ultras XXI; Brigada Ultras Sporting |
| Estádio de São Luís | SC Farense | South Side Boys |
| Estádio José Gomes | CF Estrela da Amadora | Magia Tricolor |
| Estádio Municipal de Braga | SC Braga | Red Boys 92; Bracara Legion 2003 |
| Estádio Municipal 22 de Junho | FC Famalicão | Fama Boys 1990 |
| Estádio D. Afonso Henriques | Vitória SC | Insane Guys 1994; White Angels 1999; Suspeitos do Costume 2008 |
| Estádio Comendador Manuel Violas | SC Espinho | Desnorteados |
| Complexo Desportivo de Campanhã | SC Salgueiros | Alma Salgueirista 1985 |
| Estádio Marques da Silva | AD Ovarense | Fans_1921 |
| Estádio Do Restelo | CF Os Belenenses | Fúria Azul |
| Estádio do Marítimo | Club Sport Marítimo | Fanatics13; Ultras Templários; Esquadrão Maritimista |
| Estádio Cidade de Barcelos | Gil Vicente FC | Nação Barcelense 2006 |

=== Greece ===
In Greece, most professional football teams have an ultras group. Most of them are named after a gate number which refers to the specific place where the fans are situated at the stadium. Others have actual names or no special names at all and they are named after their supporting team.

| Stadium | Club | Name |
|---|---|---|
| Karaiskakis Stadium | Olympiacos | Gate 7 |
| Agia Sophia Stadium | AEK Athens | Original 21 (Gate 21) |
| Toumba Stadium | PAOK | Gate 4 |
| Kleanthis Vikelidis Stadium | Aris | SUPER-3 |
| Leoforos Stadium/OAKA | Panathinaikos | Gate 13 |
| Peristeri Stadium | Atromitos | Fentagin |
| Theodoros Vardinogiannis Stadium | OFI | Gate 4 (Snakes) |
| Panetolikos Stadium | Panetolikos | Gate 6 (Warriors) |
| Theodoros Kolokotronis Stadium | Asteras Tripolis | Tigers Ultras |
| AEL FC Arena | AEL | Monsters (Gate 1) |
| Nea Smyrni Stadium | Panionios | Panthers (Gate 3) |
| Kaftanzoglio Stadium | Iraklis | Autonomous Gate 10 |
| Lamia Municipal Stadium | Lamia | Fadomades (Gate 3) |
| Serres Municipal Stadium | Panseraikos | Che Guevara Club (Gate 5) |
| Zosimades Stadium | PAS Giannina | Pagouria (Gate 7) |
| Stavros Mavrothalassitis Stadium | Egaleo | Gate 12 |
| Volos Municipal Stadium | Olympiakos Volou FC | Austrian boys (Gate 1) |
| Pantelis Magoulas Stadium | Niki Volou FC | Blue Angels (Gate 3) |
| Trikala Municipal Stadium | Trikala F.C. | Sakafliades Trikala Club (Gate 4) |
| Perivolia Municipal Stadium | AO Chania | Gate 4 (Blue Boys) |
| Nikaia Municipal Gymnasium | Proodeftiki F.C. | Viva PROO-Crimson club |
| Municipal Stadium of Moschato | Ethnikos Piraeus FC | Gate 14 (Pinezes) |
| Kalamaria Stadium | Apollon Kalamarias FC | Club Rossoneri (Gate 2) |
| Panthessaliko Stadium | Volos F.C. | Volos Fan Club (Gate 2) |
| Levadia Municipal Stadium | Levadiakos F.C. | Barbarians (Gate 1) |
| Municipal Stadium of Karditsa | Anagennisi Karditsa F.C. | Ultras 3 |
| Pankritio Stadium | Ergotelis F.C. | Daltons club (Gate 1) and Alternatives Fans of Ergotelis |
| Agrotikos Asteras Stadium | Agrotikos Asteras F.C. | Green Ghetto Club (Gate 2) |
| Doxa Drama Stadium | Doxa Drama F.C. | Mavraetoi (Gate 4) |
| Ilioupoli Municipal Stadium | Ilioupoli F.C. | Rebels -9- |
| Kostas Davourlis Stadium | Panachaiki F.C. | Norteños Patras (Gate 3) |
| Aigio Municipal Stadium | Panegialios F.C. | Mavri Thiela-Melanoleuki |
| Kalamata Municipal Stadium | Kalamata F.C. | Bulldogs (Gate 5) |
| Municipal Stadium of Tsaritsani "Georgios Mitsibonas" | Oikonomos Tsaritsani F.C. | Zvan Boys |
| Municipal Stadium of Edessa | Edessaikos F.C. | Water Boys (Gate 3) |
| Makedonikos Stadium | Makedonikos F.C. | Makedonikos Fan Club "Οι Πράσινοι" |
| Maleme Stadium and Perivolia Municipal Stadium | Platanias F.C. | Platanias Ultras (Gate 15) |
| Veria Stadium | Veria F.C. | Queen's Boyz (Gate 4) |
| Xanthi FC Arena, Xanthi Ground | Xanthi F.C. | Xanthi Fans Club |

=== Armenia ===
In Armenia, many of the professional football clubs contain ultras groups, typically either named after their team, the specific sector in the stadium where the fans reside, or the district the majority the fans are from. The most popular football clubs with devoted fans are FC Pyunik, FC Urartu, FC Shirak, and FC Ararat Yerevan. The largest ultras is FAF Ultras (First Armenian Front), an organized supporters group dedicated to the Armenian national football team. They are known for creating strong atmospheres in the stadium through passionate chants, banners, and tifos. In December 2025, the FAF Ultras assisted a visiting Polish fan group, Legia Warshaw, by providing accommodation arrangements, which led to the Polish fans displaying a banner in the following match: 'FAF - RESPECT!'.

| Stadium | Club | Name |
|---|---|---|
| Vazgen Sargsyan Republican Stadium | FC Pyunik | Sector 18 |
| Urartu Stadium | FC Urartu | South West Ultras (Malatia-Sebastia District) |
| Gyumri City Stadium | FC Shirak | Black Panthers (Bagratuni Dynasty) |
| Vazgen Sargsyan Republican Stadium | FC Ararat Yerevan | The White Eagles |
| Abovyan City Stadium | FC Noah | Noah's Ark |
| Gandzasar Stadium | FC Gandzasar Kapan | The Bears |

=== Serbia ===
Red Star Belgrade have one of the most dedicated ultras groups in Europe, Delije is a collective name for supporters of various groups that are a part of the Red Star Belgrade multi-sport club. They attend every match, and usually do choreographies and shout chants, with many subgroups present on the stadium as well.

FK Partizan, have an ultras group of their own named Grobari (Gravediggers).They generally support all clubs within the Partizan multi-sports club, and mostly wear black and white symbols, which are the club's colors.

=== Denmark ===
FC Copenhagen (Sektion 12) and Brøndby IF (Sydsiden) have ultras, and their derby is considered to be one of the most notable in Europe.

AaB's ultras group caused a 14-minute delay in the 2020 Danish Cup final for a failure to adhere to COVID-19 social distancing rules. The group was ultimately ejected from the stadium and the game resumed, which was won by Sønderjyske.

=== Italy ===
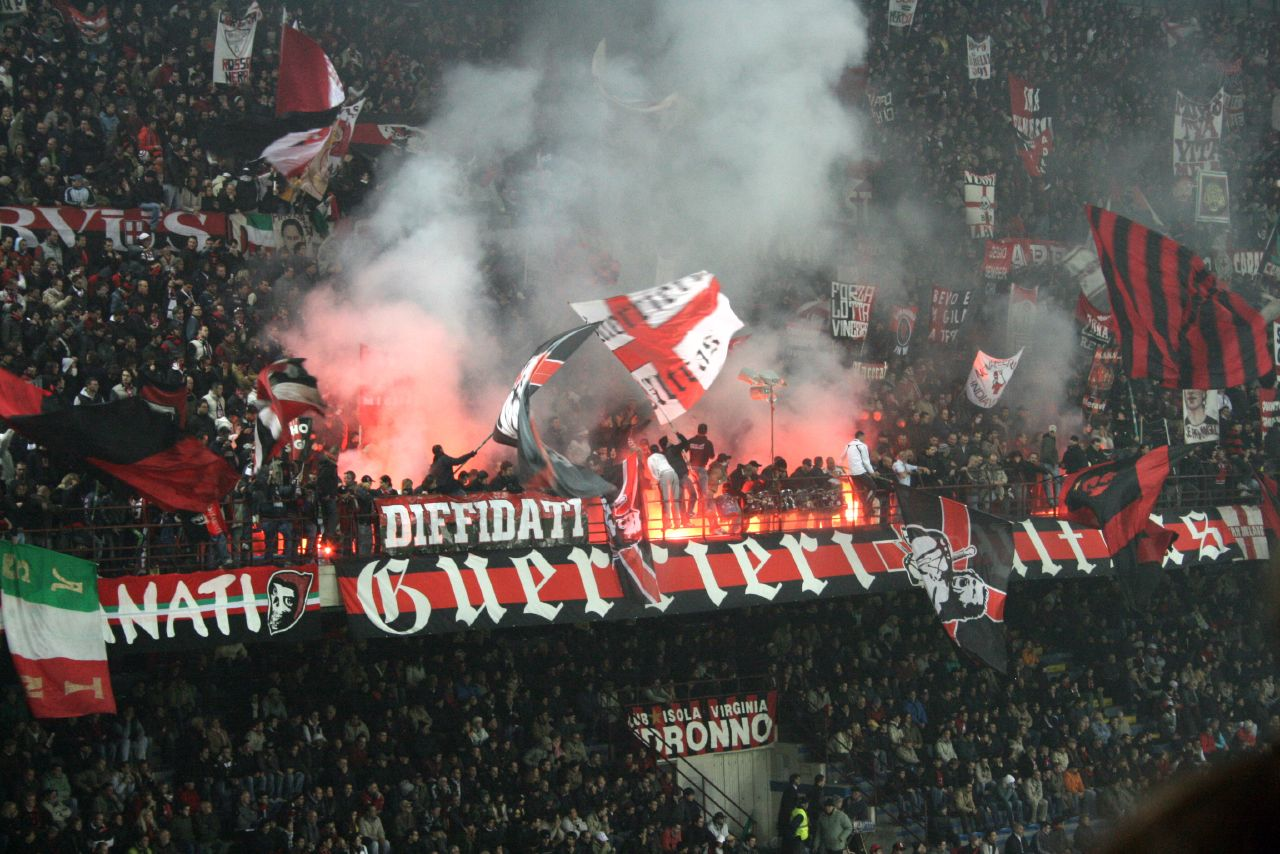
AC Milan ultras in 2006

In Italy, most professional football clubs have an ultras group which attends every match and has dedicated seating areas in either the north or south end of the stadium behind the goals. Each ultras group will have one or more leaders who choreograph chants, and who hand out banners and flags to other people in the stand to wave throughout the match. Ultras have been credited with creating fantastic atmospheres inside the stadium; however they have also come under universal criticism because of ties to various gangs and the mafia, as well as causing violence which often takes place outside the stadium prior to a match. Over the years inappropriate chanting has resulted in the FIGC issuing partial or full stadium bans to clubs. The ultras will choreograph a wide range of chants throughout a match, but some of the most common chants that result in a ban are anti-Southern chants towards clubs which are located in the South of Italy, most notably towards Napoli, as well as racist chants towards opposition players. However, these issues only partially represent parts of the Ultras culture in Italy – Ultras in Italy are also known for giving housing to immigrants or helping Italian citizens in need, as well as aiding with food and money during the Covid pandemic to their local hospitals.

| Stadium | Club | Name |
|---|---|---|
| San Siro | AC Milan | Curva Sud Milano |
| San Siro | Inter Milan | Curva Nord Milano |
| Juventus Stadium | Juventus | Drughi Bianconeri; Gruppo Storico Fighters; Viking Juve; Nucleo 1985; Tradizione-Antichi Valori |
| Stadio Olimpico | Roma | Curva Sud; Gruppo Quadraro |
| Stadio Diego Armando Maradona | Napoli | Curva A Curva B |
| Stadio Olimpico | Lazio | Irriducibili; Ultras Lazio |
| Stadio Atleti Azzurri d'Italia | Atalanta | Vecchia Guardia; Ultras Tanto Tornano; Per Chi Non Può Essere |

=== Republic of Ireland ===
Several groups exist in Ireland, as follows:

- Shamrock Rovers – SRFC Ultras, 1899 fanatics
- St Patrick's Athletic – Shed End Invincibles
- Derry City F.C. – Ultras Derry, North Stand Derry
- Drogheda United – Famous 45 Ultras
- Dundalk FC – Shed Side Army
- Bohemian FC – Notorious Boo Boys
- Galway United F.C. – Maroon Army
- Waterford F.C. – Block E Boys
- Kerry F.C. – North Terrace Boys
- Finn Harps F.C. – Ballybofey Brigade
- Sligo Rovers – Forza Rovers
- Cork City FC – Commandos 84
- Treaty United – Blue Army
- Wexford F.C. – Slaneyside Crew
- Shelbourne FC – Briogaid Dearg, Boys 1895
- Bray Wanderers – Na Fanaithe
- Longford Town – Section O

=== Slovakia ===
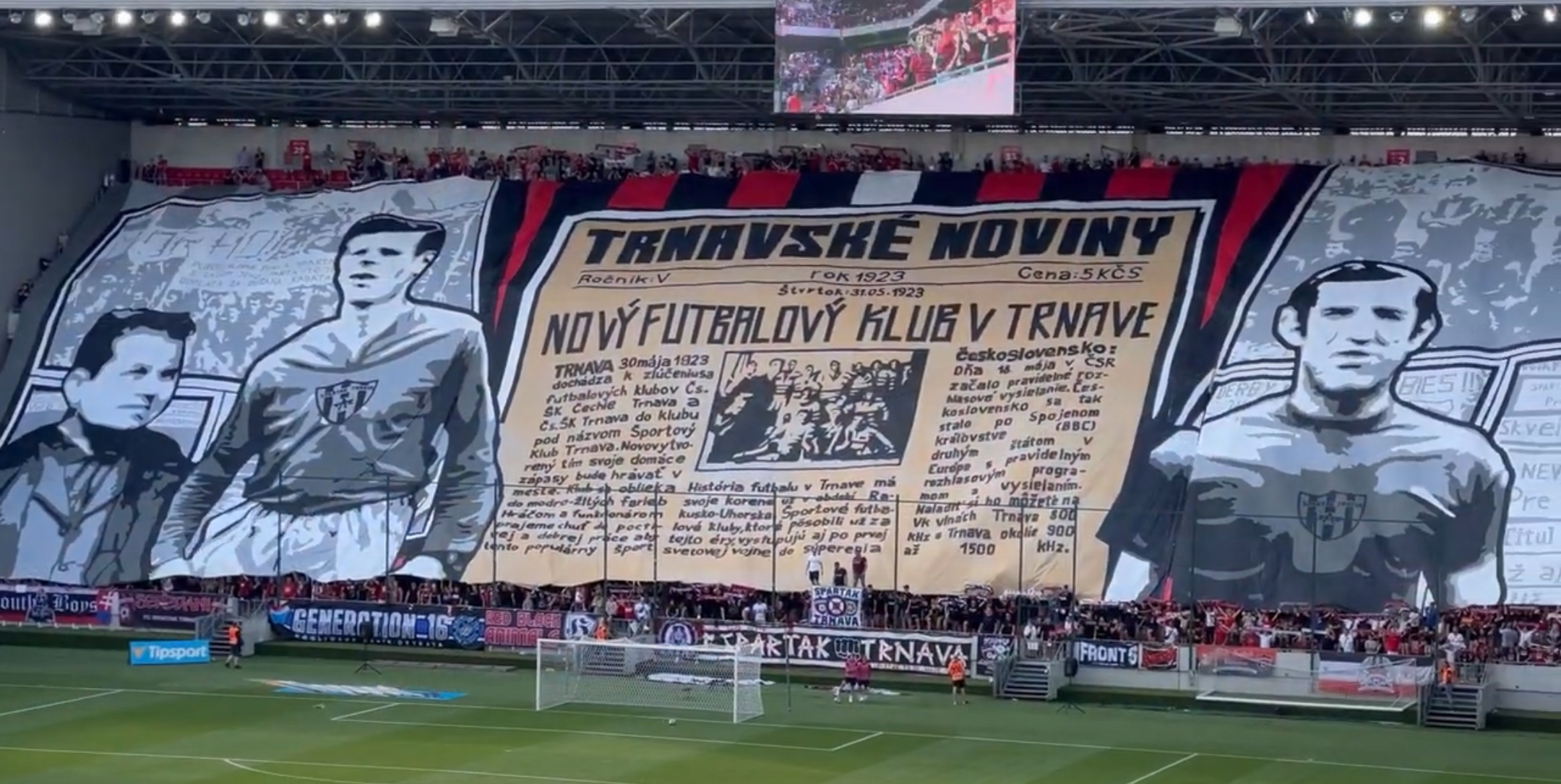
Ultras Spartak all-stand tifo.

Multiple groups of active Ultras groups exists in Slovakia, with the most active being Ultras Spartak.

In a match between Spartak Trnava and Slovan Bratislava in 2021, there was a full blown fight on the pitch between both ultras, with the game being cancelled and postponed. As a result of this incident, Spartak Trnava would have to play the next three home matches without the Ultras, with entry only allowed for children under 15 years of age, and Slovan would have to pay heavy fines.

| Stadium | Club | Name | Est. |
|---|---|---|---|
| Anton Malatinský Stadium | Spartak Trnava | Ultras Spartak | 1988 |
| Tehelné pole | Slovan Bratislava | Ultras Slovan | — |
| DAC Aréna | DAC Dunajská Streda | YBS (Yellow Blue Supporters) | — |
| Štadión pod Dubňom | MŠK Žilina | Žilinskí Šošoni (Žilina Shoshones) | — |
| Štadión pod Čebraťom | MFK Ružomberok | Ultras Concordia | — |
| Košická futbalová aréna | FC Košice | Ultras Košice | — |

=== Poland ===
The first Polish ultras groups were formed in 1970s by fans of Legia Warszawa and Arka Gdynia, although the pioneering fan groups in Poland were ŁKS Łódź and Polonia Bytom – the end of the 1960s. Those early ultra groups identified as either fascist or national-socialist and opposed the communist government of Wojciech Jaruzelski. The 1990s saw the continuing spread and development of the ultra culture with the formation of the Wisła Sharks and Cracovia Jude Gang groups, the former often regarded in Poland as the first full-fledged ultras group. With intimidating and non-stop chanting, they made their presence felt in the stands. Modern hooligans try to be inconspicuous when they enter the stadium; usually not wearing team colours, to avoid detection by the police and PZPN officials.

=== Spain ===
Spanish ultraism is generally agreed to have come from Italian ultraism and English hooliganism at the 1982 World Cup held in Spain. Held only seven years after the death of Francisco Franco, the World Cup was an opportunity for Spain to join the world of modern international football. Spanish ultraism is particularly known for its dramatic and polarized distinction across two ideological cleavages: fascism and (regional) nationalism. The vast majority of ultra groups identify as either fascist or anti-fascist, and either separatist or nationalist.

=== The Netherlands ===
In the Netherlands, most professional football teams have an ultras group, although it started with casual/hooliganism in the late 70s/ early 80s. The first hooligan group in the Netherlands was formed in the 1970s by fans of Feyenoord, they called themselves vak s, later new groups came, the S.C.F. Hooligans were the first one. After vak s was formed, many other hooligan groups started forming such as AFC Ajax (F-side), FC Utrecht (Bunnikside), ADO Den Haag (north side), De Graafschap (Brigata Tifosi), FC Twente (Vak-P), FC Groningen (Z-Side). Some of them later became ultra groups.

=== Belgium ===
Most clubs in Belgium have an ultra-group, such as Sporting Charleroi (Storm Ultras 2001), Sint-Truidense V.V. (Brigada Hesbania), KRC Genk (Drughi Genk), RSC Anderlecht (Mauves Army 2003), Standard Liège (Ultras Inferno 1996), KAA Gent (Ultras Ghent ‘14).

=== Luxembourg ===
Several clubs in Luxembourg have an ultras group, such as FC Differdange 03 (UD45), Jeunesse Esch (Ultras Esch), Avenir Beggen (Ultras Beggen), Luxembourg national football team (M-Block)

=== Bosnia and Herzegovina ===
People in Bosnia and Herzegovina are known for their national ultras group BHFanaticos. Also, they have a few ultras that are connected to football clubs Manijaci, Horde zla, Lešinari, Red Army, Škripari, Ultras Mostar and many more.

=== Cyprus ===
Gate-9 (Greek: Θύρα 9 ) is a Cypriot fans' group that supports the football team People's Athletic Club Omonia 1948 and all the sport departments of AC Omonia except football. Omonia supporters are traditionally left wing. A 2009 gallop poll estimated that three out of four Omonia fans vote for the Progressive Party of Working People, the communist party of Cyprus. While the group retains its left wing beliefs, in recent years it has been openly critical of the party's involvement in the club's administrative decisions. The party has denied accusations that it influences club decisions. Gate-9 members are associated with communist beliefs and have been noted for waving banners bearing Che Guevara's portrait, and other communist symbols. The group is also involved in humanitarian work for refugees in Cyprus. The group, besides Nicosia, has fan clubs in Limassol, Athens, Thessaloniki, Larnaka, Paphos, and London.

There are also ultras groups affiliated with the APOEL FC and the Anorthosis Famagusta FC.

=== Malta ===
Although small in size, Malta has some notable ultras groups. The main ultras groups in Malta are Birkirkara Ultras 1997, Ultras Beltin 999, and Paola Boys Hibs Ultras, Sliema Ultras Blue Gladiators as well as the Maltese national football team ultras group, the South End Core.

=== Ukraine ===
| Stadium | Club | Name |
|---|---|---|
| Chernihiv Stadium | Desna Chernihiv | Ultras Desna |

=== Romania ===
Romania's ultras only finds itself in the traditional teams like Steaua Bucharest, FCSB, Dinamo Bucharest and Rapid Bucharest; but there are some small ultras groups which support their local club. The biggest ultras groups are: Peluza Nord FCSB, Peluza Sud CSA Steaua București, Peluza Cătălin Hîldan Dinamo Bucuresti, Peluza Sud Dinamo Bucuresti, Peluza Nord Rapid, Peluza Sud Timisoara, t2 Rapid, Peluza Şepcile Roşii and Peluza Nord Hunedoara. There are also some honourable mentions like Peluza Marină Farul, Peluza Sud Craiova and Peluza Nord Galați.

=== Turkey ===
The three big clubs of Turkey, namely Beşiktaş, Fenerbahçe and Galatasaray, have dedicated fanbases. The ultras of these clubs are Çarşı, Genç Fenerbahçeliler and ultrAslan, respectively.

=== Bulgaria ===
The most famous ultras in Bulgaria are Sector B (Levski Sofia), Sector G (CSKA Sofia), Bultras (Botev Plovdiv), Green Fighters (Neftochimic Burgas), Moryatsi (Cherno More Varna) and Lauta Army (Lokomotiv Plovdiv).

=== Azerbaijan ===
Several groups exist in Azerbaijan, with the most prominent being Forza Neftçi (Neftçi PFK), Köhne 13 (Neftçi PFK), and Kapaz Ultras (Kapaz PFK).

=== Croatia ===
There are many ultras groups in Croatia but the most popular are:

- Bad Blue Boys (Dinamo Zagreb, 1986)
- Torcida Split (Hajduk Split, 1950)
- Armada Rijeka (HNK Rijeka, 1987)
- Kohorta Osijek (NK Osijek, 1988)
- Tornado Zadar (HNK Zadar, KK Zadar, 1965)
- Demoni Pula (NK Istra 1961, 1992)
- Funcuti Šibenik (NK Šibenik, KK Šibenik, 1983)
- Ultras Vinkovci (HNK Cibalia, 1982)

=== Finland ===
- Niilon pojat, Vestito di nero (Ilves Tampere, 1931)
- Sakilaiset, Vecchi Ragazzi, Usual Suspects Helsinki(HJK Helsinki, 1907)
- 1922 Youths, 1922Casuals (TPS Turku, 1922)
- Red Army, ultras06 (Vaasan sport, 1962)
- Lahti youth huorat (FC Lahti, 1996)
- Raumam boja (Rauman Lukko, 1936)
- Itäpääty (FC Inter, 1990)
- Hakapeliitat (FC Haka, 1934)
- Stadin Kingit, Inferno (HIFK Helsinki, 1897)
- Brigata 686 (FF Jaro, 1965)

=== Kazakhstan ===
- Green Wall Ultras – FC Atyrau
- Legion ultras – FC Zhenis
- Northpoint ultras – FC Astana
- 13 sector – FC Aktobe
- Texas ultras – FC Ordabasy
- Turan ultras – FC Turan
- Verniy 70 – FC Kairat

== Africa ==
=== Algeria ===
| Stadium | Club | Name |
|---|---|---|
| Ali La Pointe Stadium | MC Alger | Virage Sud – Ultras the Twelfth Player 2011 – Ultras Green Corsairs 2012 – Ultra' Amore E Mentalita |
| Stade du 5 Juillet, | USM Alger | Virage Algerois – Les Unionistes Algérois – El Assima – Alger Offender |
| Nelson Mandela Stadium, | CR Belouizdad | Volcana – Ultras Fanatic Reds 2009 |
| Stade 8 Mai 1945, Setif | ES Setif | Curva Nord – Ultras Inferno 10 – Les Fidèles 58 – Ultras Gladiators 16 |
| May 19, 1956 Stadium | USM Annaba | Curva Nord – Les indepandants de bone 12; Curva Sud – Ultras Hippone |
| Hocine Aït Ahmed Stadium | JS Kabylie | – Ultra Kabylie Boys 09 – Ultras The Leader 13 |
| Mohamed Hamlaoui Stadium, Constantine | CS Constantine | Curva Nord – Ultras Green Army 2012 – Ultra' Iqbal 2023 – Desctrolados |
| 1 November 1954 Stadium (Algiers) | USM El Harrach | Curva Harrachia – Ultra' Combattiva 2020 |
| 20 August 1955 Stadium (Algiers), Algiers | NA Hussein Dey | Curva Razzista – Ultra Dey Boys 09 |
| Stade 20 Août 1955, Skikda | JSM Skikda | Curva Sud Skikda – Ultras Guardie Nere – Ultra' Capitano – Marinai 21 |
| Maghrebi Unity Stadium | MO Bejaia | Zona 1954 – Ultras Granchio 09 – Ultras Saldae Kings 2011 – Ultras Free Men 16 – Ultra Mobiste |
| Rouibah Hocine Stadium | JS Djijel | – Ultra' Green Gunners – Ultras Free Fans – Ouled el Corniche |
| Brakni Brothers Stadium | USM Blida | – Ultras Green Killers 2014 – Les Blidéens – Green Rose |
| April 13, 1958 Stadium, Saida | MC Saida | – Ultras Saida |
| Miloud Hadefi Stadium, Oran | MC Oran | – Ultras Red Castle 2011 – Ultras Leones Rey 2009 – Forza Mouloudia |
| Mohamed Boumezrag Stadium, Chlef | ASO Chlef | – Ultras Polina 10 – Ultras Asnam Boys 1437 – Groupe Djawarih 2014 – Group Armata Rosso 2019 |
| 1 November 1954 Stadium (Batna), | CA Batna | – Ultra' Autochtones 2024 |
| Stade Imam Lyes, Médéa | O Medea | – Ultra' Olympic Medea – Titteri Ragazzi 2024 |
| Stade Zerdani Hassouna | US Chaouia | – Ultras Giallo Boys 13 |
| February 24, 1956 Stadium, Sidi Bel Abbès | USM Bel Abbès | – Ultras Scorpion Trop Puissant – Ultras Verde Veteranos |
| 20 August 1955 Stadium, Bordj Bou Arréridj | CA Bordj Bou Arréridj | – Ultras Commandos 2008 – Ultras Monstros 18 |
| El Alia Sports Complex | US Biskra | – Ultras Vescera |
| Touhami Zoubir Khelifi Stadium | AS Aïn M'lila | – Red Scorpion – RossoNero |
| Stade Akid Lotfi | WA Tlemcen | – Ultras Kop 13 |
| Stade 20 Août 1955 (Béchar) | JS Saoura | – Ultras Giallo Verde |
| Stade Messaoud Zougar | MC El Eulma | – Ultras Vikings 2009 – Ultras Red Army 2013 – Les Unis |
| Maghrebi Unity Stadium | JSM Bejaia | – Ultras Gouraya United – Ultras Marins |
| 1 November 1954 Stadium (Batna), | MSP Batna | – Les Genies – Ultras Guida Nascosta – I Prescelti |
| Ismaïl Makhlouf Stadium | RC Arbaâ | – Ultras Blue Vichingo – Ultras Tauras Blue |
| Stade Tahar Zoughari | RC Relizane | – Ultras Mina Men |
| Amar Hamam Stadium | USM Khenchela | – Ultras Mascula 13 – Casa Nera – Ciskaoua |
| Stade Mokhtar Abdelatif | Amal Bou Saâda | – Ultras Ouled el Khadra |
| Habib Bouakeul Stadium | ASM Oran | – Ultras Verde Lupo |
| Stade Mohamed Reggaz | WA Boufarik | – La Fiamma |
| Stade Ben Abdelmalek | MO Constantine | – Ultras Libertados 13 |
| Stade Souidani Boujemaa | ES Guelma | – Black Solidier |
| Omar Oucief Stadium | CR Témouchent | – Ultras Red Wolves |
| Ahmed Kaïd Stadium | JSM Tiaret | – Ultras Cavalier Blue – Ultras Blue Eagles |
| Stade Amar Benjamaa | ES Collo | – Ultras Los Marinos 23 |
| Stade Mohamed Bensaïd | ES Mostaganem | – Ultras Verde Marinero 12 |
| Stade Mohamed Bensaïd | WA Mostaganem | – El Widadyoun 1945 |
| Stade de l'Unité Africaine | GC Mascara | – Ultras Green Storm 2008 – Born To Support |
| Mohamed Benhaddad Stadium | RC Kouba | – Ultras Green Fans – Ultras Raed 2015 |
| 1 November 1954 stadium | US Souf | – Group Quicksand 2023 |
| 13 February Stadium | CR Béni Thour | – Ultras Crazy Fans – Les vrais 30 |
| Salah Takdjerad Stadium | JS Bordj Ménaïel | – Pure Blood 2023 |
| 1 November 1954 stadium | Olympique Akbou | – Ultras Brawers |
| 11 December 1961 Stadium | HB Chelghoum Laïd | – Ragazzi Verde |
| Mohamed Belkebir Stadium | SKAF Khemis Miliana | – Cardellino Scuola |
| Mohamed Mouaz Stadium | ESM Koléa | – Ultras Etoile Verde |
| Ahmed Khalfa Stadium | WR M'Sila | – Ouled el hodna |
| Mila Stadium | CB Mila | – Ultras Salerno 2011 |
| Abderrahmane Allag Stadium | CRB Aïn Fakroun | – Oussalit Boys |
| El Milia Stadium | CRB EL Milia | – Les Fidèles 2017 |
| 13 February Stadium | MB rouissat | – Les Vagues Blues |

=== Morocco ===
| Stadium | Club | Name |
|---|---|---|
| Prince Moulay Abdellah Stadium | Association Sportive des FAR | Curva Ché – Ultras Askary 2005 – Black Army 2006 |
| Stade Mohamed V | Wydad AC | Curva Nord – Ultras Winners 2005 |
| Stade Mohamed V | Raja CA | Curva Sud – Ultras Green Boys 2005 – Ultras Eagles 2006 |
| Ibn Batouta Stadium | Ittihad Riadi Tanger | Curva Loca – Ultra Hercules 2007 |
| Complexe sportif de Fès | Maghreb de Fès | Curva Savanna – Ultras Fatal Tigers 2006 |
| Complexe sportif de Fès | Wydad de Fès | – Ultras Bianco Nero 2008 |
| Complexe sportif de Phosphate | Olympique Club de Khouribga | – Ultras Green Ghost 2007 |
| Stade Municipal (Kenitra) | Kenitra athletic club | – Ultras Helala Boys 2007 |
| Stade Adrar | Hassania Agadir | Curva Sud – Ultras Imazighen 2006; Curva Nord – Ultras Supras Rebels 46 |
| Stade Saniat Rmel | Moghreb Tetouan | Fondo Norte – Ultras Los Matadores 2005 – Ultras Siempre Paloma 2006 |
| Stade Municipal de Berkane | RS Berkane | Curva Nord – Ultras Orange Boys 07 |
| Stade Mimoun Al Arsi | Chabab Rif Al Hoceima | – Ultras Rif Boys 2010 – Ultras Los Rifeños 2012 |
| Stade El Massira | Olympic Safi | Curva Arena – Ultras Shark 2006 |
| Stade du 18 novembre | Ittihad Khemisset | – Ultras Cavaliers Family 2009 |
| Stade de Marrakech | Kawkab Marrakech | Curva Sud – Ultras Crazy Boys 2006 |
| Honneur Stadium | MC Oujda | – Ultras Brigade Wajda 2007 |
| Honneur Stadium | USM Oujda | – Ultras Pioneers 10 |
| Stade Boubker Ammar | AS Salé | – Ultras Red Pirates 06 – Ultras Pirates 07 – Ultras Fanatics 09 |
| Stade Municipal De Khénifra | Chabab Atlas Khénifra | – Ultras Révoltés 2012 |
| Stade Bachir | SCC Mohammédia | – Ultras Warriors 2008 – Banda Rossa 48 |
| Stade D'honneur De Meknès | COD Meknès | Virage Nord – Ultras Red Men 2008; Virage Sud – Ultras Vulcano Rosso 2010 |
| Stade El Abdi | Difaâ Hassani El Jadidi | Virage Sud – Ultras Cap Soleil 2007 |
| Stade Municipal (Oued Zem) | Rapide Oued Zem | – Ultras Martyrs 2007 |
| Berrechid Municipal Stadium | Youssoufia Berrechid | – Ultras Liberta 13 |
| Stade d'honneur de Beni Mellal | Raja Beni Mellal | – Ultras Star Boys 2007 |
| Complexe Bernoussi | CR Bernoussi | – Ultras Stars Boys 2011 – Ultras Alber City 2013 |
| Stade de Settat | RS Settat | – Ultras Imbrator 2012 – Ultras Masked 2008 |
| Stade Tiznit | Amal Tiznit | – Ultras Risings 2008 |
| Stade de Tan-Tan | NS Tantan | – Ultras 2Tan Boys 2008 |
| Stade du 16 Novembre | Chabab Houara | – Ultras Giallo Pizzi 2009 |
| Stade Municipal d'Aït Melloul | USM Aït Melloul | – Ultras Swassa Boys 2011 |
| Stade du Errachidia | US Errachidia | – Ultras Sand Men 2012 |
| Stade Municipal d'Dakhla | CM Dakhla | – Ultras Culture Boys 2007 |
| Stade du Sheikh Mohamed Laghdaf | JS Massira | – Ultras Sahara Strong 2007 |

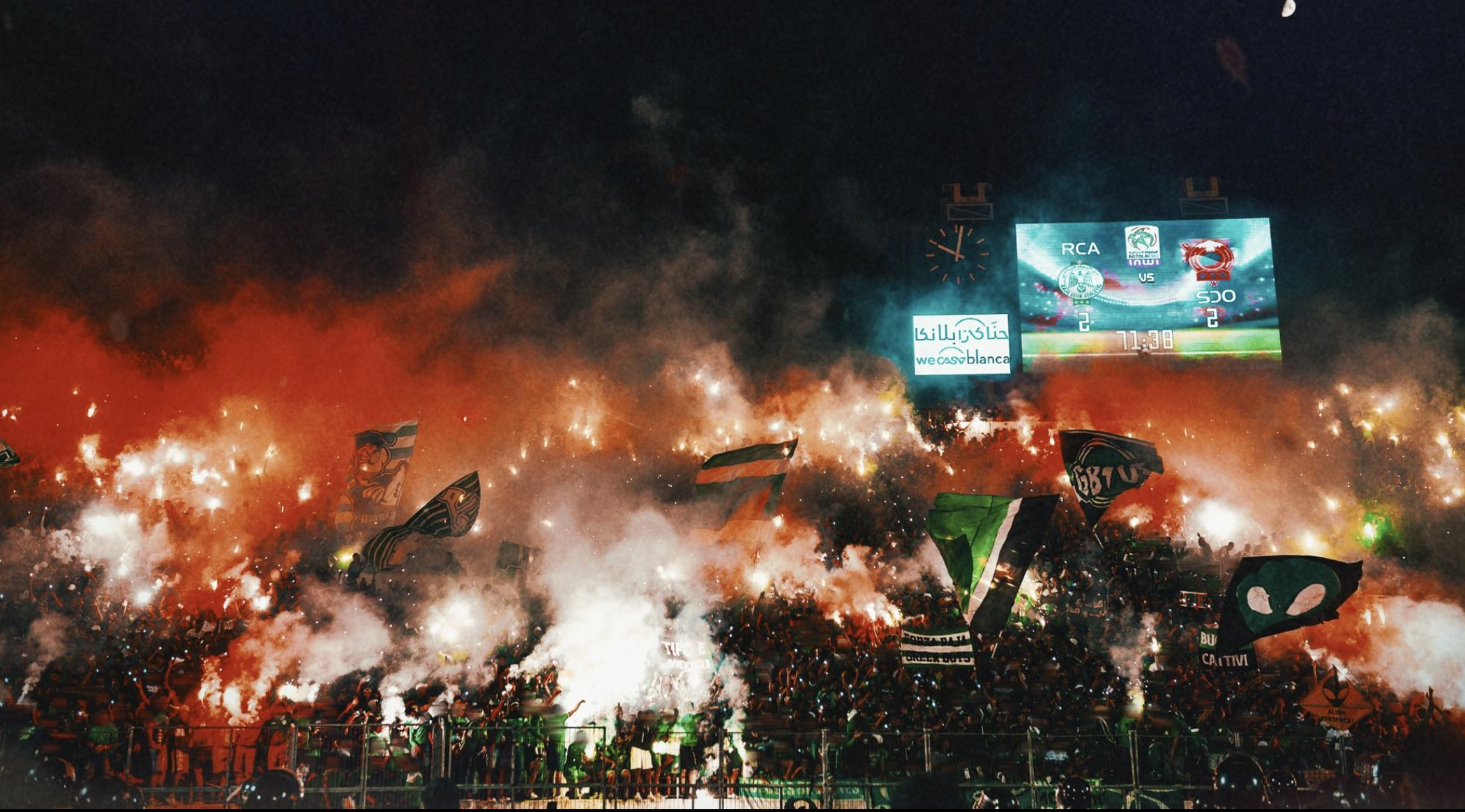
The Curva Sud in a RCA vs OCS match in 2022

The history of Moroccan ultras can be traced back to the early 2000s, with the formation of the first ultras group, Ultras Tanger, in 2003. However, the first ultras group that still exists today is Ultras Green Boys, which was founded in 21/06/2005 to support Raja Casablanca. That same year, Ultras Askary Rabat was founded to support AS FAR and Ultras Winners was founded to support Wydad Casablanca. The Moroccan ultras movement quickly gained momentum and popularity, with other notable groups such as Ultras Eagles (also supporting Raja Casablanca), being formed in 2006. Moroccan ultras groups are heavily influenced by European ultras movements, and are known for their passionate and dedicated support of their favorite football clubs. They are also known for their elaborate displays of choreographed support, including banners, flags, flares, and coordinated chants. Despite facing challenges, such as financial costs and loss of members, Moroccan ultras groups remain an important part of the country's football culture, known for their intense rivalries and unwavering support of their clubs.

=== Egypt ===
The clubs in Egypt became a major political force during the uprising against Mubarak in 2011, but were known for long-standing animosity with the police. When 38 members of the Ultras Devils were arrested in "Shebeen al-Kom" for "belonging to an illegal group" plus additional violent offences, it was seen as a crackdown on the organisations by authorities.

In 2013, the Associated Press stated that the Egyptian Ultras network was one of the most organised movements in Egypt after the Muslim Brotherhood.

| Stadium | Club | Name |
|---|---|---|
| Cairo International Stadium | Al Ahly SC | Curva Nord – Ultras Ahlawy (UA07) – Ultras Devils |
| Cairo International Stadium | Zamalek SC | Curva Sud – Ultras White Knights (UWK) |
| Port Said Stadium | Al-Masry SC | – Ultras Green Eagles |
| Suez Stadium | Suez Montakhab | – Ultras Suez Fedyan |
| Ghazl El Mahalla Stadium | Ghazl El Mahalla SC | – Ultras Whales 2008 |
| Ismailia Stadium | Ismaily SC | – Ultras Yellow Dragons – Ultras Rebels |
| Alexandria Stadium | Al Ittihad Alexandria Club | – Ultras Green Magic |
| El Mansoura Stadium | El Mansoura SC | – Ultras Orange Dragons |
| Aswan Stadium | Aswan SC | – Ultras Nile Crocodile |
| El Minya Stadium | El Minya SC | – Ultras Red Camels |
| Tanta Stadium | Tanta SC | – Ultras 300 |
| Damanhour Stadium | Ala'ab Damanhour SC | – Ultras Blue Anaconda |
| Zagazig University Stadium | Sharkia SC | – Ultras Green Horses – Ultras Green Pirates – Sons of Oraby |
| Shebin Stadium | Gomhoriat Shebin SC | – Ultras Black Horses |
| El Mahalla Stadium | Baladiyat El Mahalla SC | – Ultras Red Tigers 2011 |

=== Tunisia ===
| Stadium | Club | Name |
|---|---|---|
| Stade Olympique de Radès | ES Tunis | Curva Sud Tunis – Ultras Lemkachkhines 2002 – Zapatista Esperanza 2007 – Fedayn Esperantistes 2009 – Matadors 2008 |
| Stade Olympique de Radès | Club Africain | Curva Nord Tunis – African Winners 1995 – Leaders Clubistes 2003 – North Vandals 2007 – Dodgers Clubistes 2007 |
| Stade Hédi-Enneifer | Stade Tunisien | Kop Of Bardo – Ultras 1948 – Ultras Tunis 2025 – Ultras Old Guardians 2025 |
| Stade Taïeb Mhiri | CS Sfaxien | Curva Nord Sfax – Black & White Fighters 2003 – Raged Boys 2007 – Ultras Sfaxiens 2007 |
| Stade Olympique de Sousse | ES Sahel | Curva Nord Sousse – Brigade Rouge 2001 – Ultras Fanatics 2003 – Ultras Saheliano 2007 |
| Stade 15 October | CA Bizertin | Curva Nord Bizerte – Ultras Big Boss 2010 – Ultras Marines 2005 |
| Stade Abdelaziz Chtioui | AS Marsa | – Vikings Marsois 2011 |
| Stade Mustapha Ben Jannet | US Monastir | – Ultras Monastir 2009 – Spartiates 2008 – Power Marines 2003 |
| Stade Olympique de Gabes | Stade Gabésien | Curva Sud Gabes – Verde Vikings 2011 – Sparta Verde 2009 – Mafiosa Boys 2010 – Tramps Gabes 2009 |
| Stade Olympique de Gabes | Avenir sportif de Gabès | Curva Nord Gabes – Ultras Eagles Gabes 2009 – Ultras Samurai 2009 – Ultras Rosso Nero 2012 |
| Stade Hamda Elaoueni | Jeunesse sportive kairouanaise | – Green Warriors 2008 – Los Magicos Green Stars 2011 |
| Salle couverte Taoufik-Bouhima | Étoile sportive de Radès | – Ultras Radessien 2010 |
| Salle couverte de Téboulba | Aigle sportif de Téboulba | – Ultras Viking Teboulba 2009 |
| Stade municipal de Kasserine | Avenir sportif de Kasserine | – Ultras Fraxus 2011 |
| Stade de Houmt Souk | Association sportive de Djerba | – Ultras Green Boys 2007 – Ultras Island Boys 2011 – Ultras Reckless 2013 |
| Stade Olympique de Radès | Équipe de Tunisie de football | – Carthago Boys 2012 |

=== Libya ===
| Stadium | Club | Name |
|---|---|---|
| The Tripoli International Stadium | Al-Ittihad Club (Tripoli) | – Ultras Teha Boys 2010 |
| The Tripoli International Stadium | Al Ahli SC (Tripoli) | – Ultras Flame Boys 2010 – Ultras Green Monsters 2016 |
| The Tripoli International Stadium | Al-Madina SC | – Hawatuh Boys 2023 |
| Martyrs of February Stadium | Al-Ahly SC (Benghazi) | – Ultras Butchers 2009 – Ultras Jazzara 2010 |
| Martyrs of February Stadium | Al-Nasr SC (Benghazi) | – Ultras Green Eagles 2010 – Ultras Carboniera 2013 |
| Martyrs of February Stadium | Al Tahaddy SC | – Ultras Panthers Boys 2018 |
| Misurata Stadium | Asswehly SC | – Ultras Misurata Knights 2010 |
| Misurata Stadium | Alittihad Misurata SC | – Ultras Misurata Ghosts 2018 |
| Al Bayda Stadium | Al Akhdar SC | – Ultras Dour 2018 |
| Al Khums Stadium | Al Khums SC | – Ultras Hera Boys 2018 – Ultras Alreyas Boys 2023 |
| Sorman Stadium | Rafik Sorman | – Ultras Rofa Warriors 2018 |
| 10 June Stadium | Al Ta'awon SC | – Ultras Sa7ara 2018 |
| Al marj Stadium | Al-Morouj SC | – Ultras Crimson Snakes 2019 |
| Derna Stadium | Darnes SC | – Tribuna Ragazzi 2020 |
| Jumayl Stadium | Al-Mustaqbal (football club) | – Ultras Fighters 2021 |
| Tobruk Stadium | Al-Suqoor Club | – Ultras Dean Boys 2022 |
| Zaawia Stadium | Olympic Azzaweya | – Ultras Blue Castle 2023 |
| Zuwara Stadium | Aljazeera SC | – Ultras Yellow Army 2023 |

=== Sudan ===
| Stadium | Club | Name |
|---|---|---|
| Al-Merrikh Stadium | Al-Merrikh SC | – Ultras Jawareh 2008 –Ultras Olympus Mons 13 |
| Al-Hilal Stadium | Al-Hilal SC | – Ultras Blue Lions 2008 |

=== Rwanda ===
| stadium | club | name |
|---|---|---|
| Amahoro Stadium | Rayon Sports F.C. | GIKUNDIRO FANS |
| Amahoro Stadium | APR F.C. | zone 5 |
| Umuganda Stadium | Etincelles F.C. | Etincelles F.C. fans |

=== Lesotho ===
| stadium | club | name |
|---|---|---|
| Hlotse Stadium | Linare FC | ULTRAS LINARES |
| Pitso Ground | Matlama FC | Ultras Matlama |

=== South Africa ===
| stadium | club | name |
|---|---|---|
| Orlando Stadium | Orlando Pirates F.C. | The Sea Robbers |
| Amakhosi Stadium | Kaizer Chiefs F.C. | Amakhosi |
| Cape Town Stadium | Cape Town City F.C. (2016) | Ultras Blue Eagels |
| Free State Stadium | Bloemfontein Celtic F.C. | Unity Supporters |
| Cape Town Stadium | Cape Town Spurs F.C. | Urban Warriors |

== Asia ==
=== Bangladesh ===
| Stadium | Team | Name | Notes |
|---|---|---|---|
| Shaheed Dhirendranath Datta Stadium | Mohammedan SC (Dhaka) | The Black & White Warriors | Also known as Mohammedan Ultras or MSC Ultras. |
| Bashundhara Kings Arena | Bashundhara Kings | Bashundhara Kings Ultras | First ever registered fan Ultras in Bangladesh. It was founded in 2021. |
| National Stadium, Dhaka | Bangladesh | Bangladeshi Football Ultras | First ever national team ultras in Bangladesh. |

=== China ===
| Stadium | Club | Name |
|---|---|---|
| Workers' Stadium | Beijing Guoan FC | The Royal Army (Chinese: 御林军) |
| Phoenix Hill Football Stadium | Chengdu Rongcheng | 505 Stand |
| Tongliang Long Stadium | Chongqing Tonglianglong | Yuzhou Twelve Guards (Chinese: 渝州十二卫) |
| Hanghai Stadium | Henan FC | Red Devils (Chinese: 红魔) |
| Jinan Olympic Sports Center Stadium | Shandong Taishan | Eagle Ultras Right |
| Pudong Football Stadium | Shanghai Port | Bat Knights (Chinese: 蝙蝠骑士), Curva Nord (Chinese: 红日) |
| Shanghai Stadium | Shanghai Shenhua | Blue Devils (Chinese: 蓝魔), Blue Boys (Chinese: 蓝宝) |
| TEDA Soccer Stadium | Tianjin Jinmen Tiger | Tiger Wings (Chinese: 虎翼) |

=== India ===
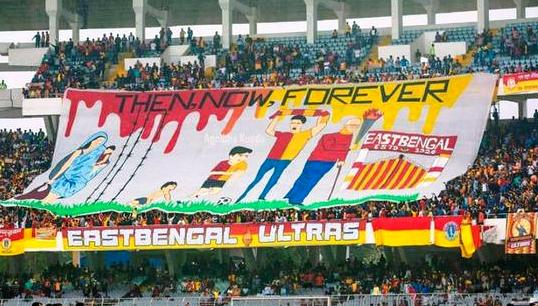
East Bengal Ultras at the Salt Lake Stadium

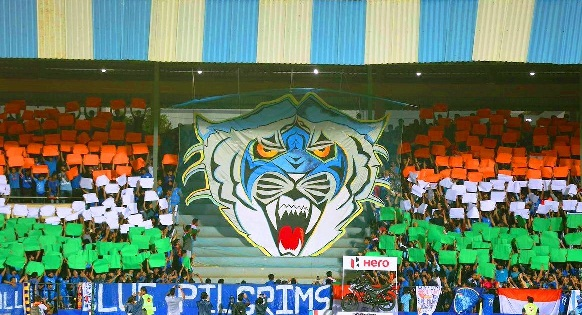
The 3D Blue Tiger tifo displayed by Blue Pilgrims in June 2018

The ultras scene in India was introduced by East Bengal Ultras, the ultras group of East Bengal FC, in 2013, and since then it grew slowly, as ultras groups of various clubs started to form and display of "Tifo's" and "Pyro" shows became very much a part of the ultras scene in Indian football.

Blue Pilgrims is an organised group of football fans who support the India national football men's team, women's team, and all the other age – group national teams at every home and away game, formed by a group of football fans of several club fan bases of football clubs from India. Founded in 2017 before the commencement of the 2017 FIFA U-17 World Cup, which was held in India, the group based their name on the nickname of the national team, the "Blue Tigers". They consider travelling with the national teams, to wherever the teams play, as their pilgrimage. They often display flags, banners, and tifos in support of the national team.

| Stadium | Club | Name |
|---|---|---|
| Salt Lake Stadium, Kolkata | East Bengal FC | – East Bengal Ultras |
| Salt Lake Stadium, Kolkata | East Bengal FC | – East Bengal the Real Power |
| Salt Lake Stadium, Kolkata | Mohun Bagan SG | – Mariners Dé Xtreme |
| Salt Lake Stadium, Kolkata | Mohun Bagan SG | – Mariners' Base Camp |
| Jawaharlal Nehru Stadium, Kochi | Kerala Blasters FC | – Manjappada |
| Sree Kanteerava Stadium, Bengaluru | Bengaluru FC | – West Block Blues |
| Indira Gandhi Athletic Stadium, Guwahati | NorthEast United FC | – Highlander Brigade |
| Jawaharlal Nehru Stadium, Chennai | Chennaiyin FC | – Super Machans |
| Kalinga Stadium, Bhubaneswar | Odisha FC | – The Juggernauts |
| Payyanad Stadium, Manjeri | Malappuram FC | ULTRAS Malappuram |

=== Indonesia ===
| Stadium | Club | Name |
|---|---|---|
| Kanjuruhan Stadium | Arema F.C. | – Curva Nord Arema |
| Kapten I Wayan Dipta Stadium | Bali United F.C. | – North Side Boys 12 |
| Segiri Stadium | Borneo F.C. Samarinda | – Curva Sud Samarinda |
| Gelora Bung Tomo Stadium | Persebaya Surabaya | – Green Nord 27 |
| Gelora Bandung Lautan Api Stadium | Persib Bandung | – Northern Wall |
| Jakarta International Stadium | Persija Jakarta | – Curva Nord Persija |
| Gelora B.J. Habibie Stadium | PSM Makassar | – PSM Fans 1915 |
| Maguwoharjo Stadium | PSS Sleman | – Brigata Curva Sud |

=== Iraq ===
| Stadium | Club | Name |
|---|---|---|
| Al-Shaab Stadium | Al-Shorta SC | – Ultras Green Harp 2012 |
| Al-Quwa Al-Jawiya Stadium | Al-Quwa Al-Jawiya | – Ultras Blue Hawk 2012 |
| Sulaymaniyah Stadium | Sulaymaniya SC | – Ultras Sulaimaniy |
| Franso Hariri Stadium | Erbil SC | – Ultras Qalla |
| Al-Zawra'a Stadium | Al-Zawraa | – Ultras The Kings |

=== Israel ===
| Stadium | Club | Name |
|---|---|---|
| Sammy Ofer Stadium | Maccabi Haifa | Green Apes 2002, Inferno Verde 2010, Avant Garde |
| Bloomfield Stadium | Hapoel Tel Aviv | Ultras Hapoel 99 |
| Bloomfield Stadium | Bnei Yehuda Tel Aviv | Lions Army |
| Teddy Stadium | Beitar Jerusalem F.C. | La Familia |
| Teddy Stadium | Hapoel Jerusalem | Brigade Malha 06 |
| Turner Stadium | Hapoel Be'er Sheva | UltraSouth |

=== Jordan ===
| Stadium | Club | Name |
|---|---|---|
| Amman International Stadium | Al-Faisaly SC | – Ultras Al Faisaly 2013 |
| King Abdullah II Stadium | Al-Wehdat SC | – Wehdaty Group 2012 –Ultras Green Knights 2018 |

=== Palestine ===
| Stadium | Club | Name |
|---|---|---|
| Dura International Stadium | Shabab Al-Khalil SC | – Ultras Khalele 2011 |
| Faisal Al-Husseini International Stadium | Hilal Al-Quds Club | – Group Hilaly |

=== Saudi Arabia ===
| Stadium | Club | Name |
|---|---|---|
| King Abdullah | Al-Ittihad | – Ultras Golden Tigers 2011 |
| King Fahd | Al Hilal | – Ultras Blue Wave 2011 |
| KSU Stadium | Al Nassr | – Ultras Al Aalami 2011 |
| King Abdullah | Al Ahli | – Ultras Al Malaki 2011 |

=== Syria ===
| Stadium | Club | Name |
|---|---|---|
| Latakia Municipal Stadium | Tishreen SC | – Ultras Eagles 2009 |
| Al-Baath Stadium | Jableh SC | – Ultras Blue Boys 2017 |
| Khalid ibn al-Walid Stadium | Al-Karamah SC | – Ultras Blue Sun |
| Deir ez-Zor Municipal Stadium | Al-Fotuwa SC | – Ultras Blue Blood |
| Al-Jalaa Stadium | Al-Wahda SC (Syria) | – Ultras Orange Pliiji |
| Latakia Municipal Stadium | Hutteen SC | – Ultras Blues |
| Khalid ibn al-Walid Stadium | Al-Sahel SC (Syria) | – Ultras Pirates 2017 |

=== United Arab Emirates ===
| Stadium | Club | Name |
|---|---|---|
| Za'abeel Stadium | Al Wasl SC | Ultras Junoon |

=== Cambodia ===
The ultras scene in Cambodia began on 28 October 2018, with the formation of Ultras Cambodia, a group dedicated to supporting the Cambodia national football team. Following this, club-specific ultras groups also emerged. Visakha FC supporters formed Ultras Visakha. and Ultras Svay Rieng, was established to support Svay Rieng FC.

=== Malaysia ===
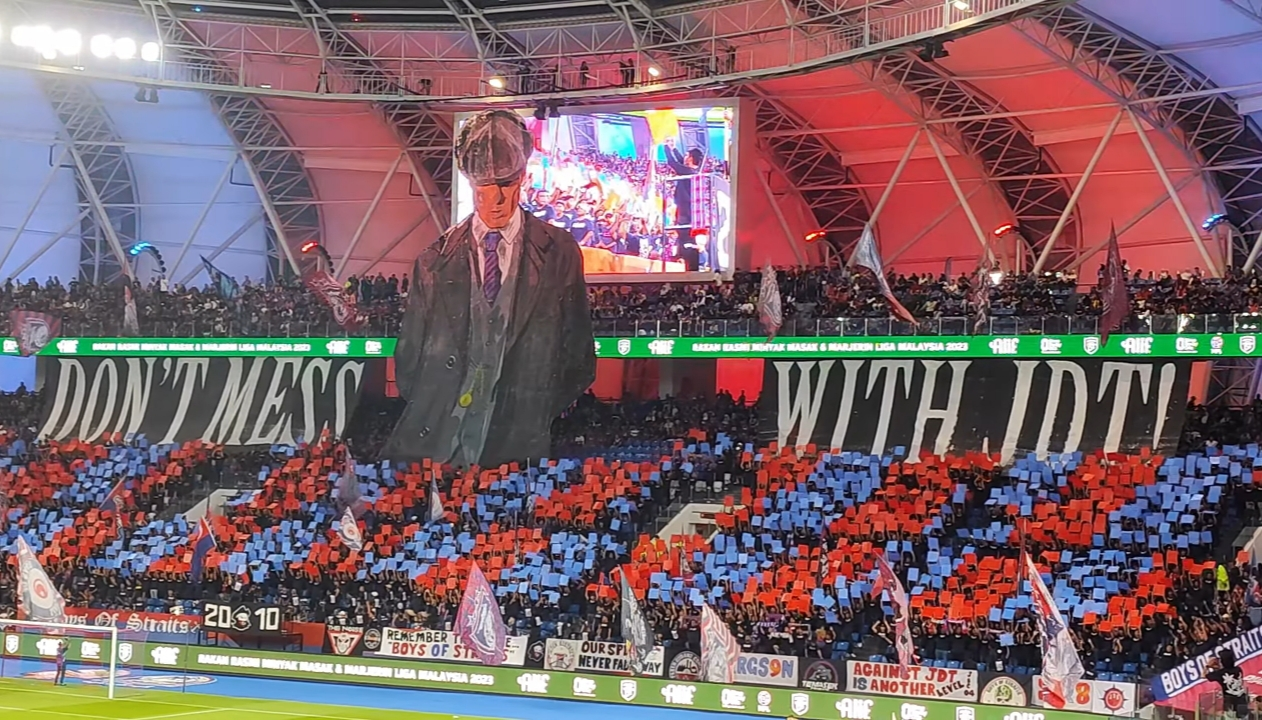
Johor Darul Ta'zim supporters at the Sultan Ibrahim Stadium during 2023 Malaysia FA Cup Final

In Malaysia, the ultras scene is characterized by the presence of "Ultras Malaya," the largest supporter club dedicated to the Malaysia national football team. "Ultras Malaya" founded in 2007 but only made their first appearances during the 2008 Merdeka Tournament when Malaysia beat Nepal 4–0.

"Ultras Malaya" boasts a diverse membership with fans from different ethnic backgrounds, states, and clubs across Malaysia. The group represents fans from all 14 states and other subdivisions within Malaysia. One of the most significant rivalries in Southeast Asian football is between "Ultras Malaya" and the fans of the Indonesia national football team. This rivalry is famously known as the "Nusantara derby" and has witnessed several intense clashes before, during, and after matches between the two nations, both on and off the field.

"Ultras Malaya" witnessed a gradual increase in its membership over the years, reaching its zenith during the AFF Suzuki Cup in 2014, when the number of members soared into the tens of thousands, although exact figures are not confirmed.

As time passed, UM07, the parent organization of "Ultras Malaya," expanded its reach by establishing subsidiary groups at the state and club levels across Malaysia. These subsidiary supporter groups are passionate in their support for both their local clubs and the national team. Here are some of the main ultras and supporters groups associated with specific states and clubs:

| Stadium | Club | Name |
|---|---|---|
| Sultan Ibrahim Stadium | Johor Darul Ta'zim | – Boys of Straits 2010 |
| MBPJ Stadium | Selangor FC | – UltraSel Curva |
| Darul Aman Stadium | Kedah Darul Aman | – Ultras Kedah 2009 |
| Sultan Mizan Zainal Abidin Stadium | Terengganu FC | – Ultras Tranung |
| Darul Makmur Stadium | Sri Pahang | – Elephant Army |
| Perak Stadium | Perak FC | – Silver State Ultras |
| Tuanku Abdul Rahman Stadium | Negeri Sembilan | – Ultras Nogori 9 |
| City Stadium | Penang FC | – Ultras Panthers |
| Likas Stadium | Sabah FC | – North Borneo Ultras |
| Sultan Muhammad IV Stadium | Kelantan FC | – Gate H Boys |
| Kuala Lumpur Football Stadium | Kuala Lumpur City | – Kuala Lumpur Ultras |
| Sarawak State Stadium | Kuching City | – Gallore Buceros 13 |
| Hang Jebat Stadium | Melaka FC | – Ultras Taming Sari |
| Utama Stadium | Perlis FC | – Brigate Gialloblu Perlis |

Within "Ultras Malaya," the role of the Capo is crucial in leading the chanting and energizing the crowd inside the stadium. One of the most well-known Capos of "Ultras Malaya" is Mohd Ridzuan Ahmad, also known as Lekir Haji Ahmad. His leadership and coordination skills have contributed to the vibrant and passionate atmosphere during Malaysia's football matches, making him a respected figure among the ultras community.

=== Japan ===
The ultras scene in Japan began in 1992 with the formation of "Ultra Nippon," a group dedicated to supporting the Japan national football team. This movement quickly gained momentum, spreading across the country and leading to the creation of ultras groups for various club teams. Nagoya Grampus supporters formed "Ultras Nagoya," while Vegalta Sendai saw the establishment of "Ultras Vegalta Sendai." Urawa Red Diamonds are supported by the "Urawa Boys," and Gamba Osaka fans are organized under the name "Gamba Ultras." Cerezo Osaka also saw the formation of a group, known as "Real Osaka Ultras"

| Stadium | Club | Name |
|---|---|---|
| Best Denki Stadium | Avispa Fukuoka | Ultra Obri |
| Yodoko Sakura Stadium | Cerezo Osaka | Cerezo Ultras |
| Panasonic Stadium Suita | Gamba Osaka | Gamba Ultras |
| Daiwa House Premist Dome | Hokkaido Consadole Sapporo | Ultras Sapporo |
| Mercari Stadium | Kashima Antlers | IN.FIGHT |
| Uvance Todoroki Stadium by Fujitsu | Kawasaki Frontale | Kawasaki Kazoku |
| ND Soft Stadium Yamagata | Montedio Yamagata | Ultras ACMY |
| Toyota Stadium | Nagoya Grampus | Ultras Nagoya |
| Saitama Stadium 2002 | Urawa Red Diamonds | Urawa Boys |
| IAI Stadium Nihondaira | Shimizu S-Pulse | Dragon Zone |
| JIT Recycle Ink Stadium | Ventforet Kofu | Mafia Azul |
| Yurtec Stadium Sendai | Vegalta Sendai | Ultras Vegalta Sendai |

=== Lebanon ===
The ultras scene was introduced to Lebanon in February 2018, with Nejmeh's "Ultras Supernova" and White ultras for racing Beirut 2019. Their rivals Ansar quickly followed with their own ultras group, "I Tifosi", one month later. Ahed formed their own ultras group, called "Ultras Yellow Inferno", the same year. Prior to the Arab Club Champions Cup game between Nejmeh and Al-Ahly of Egypt, played on 13 August 2018, seven "Ultras Supernova" fans were arrested by the Egyptian national security because of the negative connotations the word "Ultras" has in Egypt. The fans have been returned to Lebanon by request of the Lebanese Ambassador to Cairo.

=== Iran ===
Persepolis ultras of this association were registered by the club's fans association in 2014, and the place of these fans was registered at the 36th position Their place is in Azadi Stadium. Persepolis ultras are nicknamed the Red Army in Asia. They have a close competition with their long-time rival, Esteghlal, and they support their team with doza bombs and fabric designs.

== Oceania ==
=== Australia ===
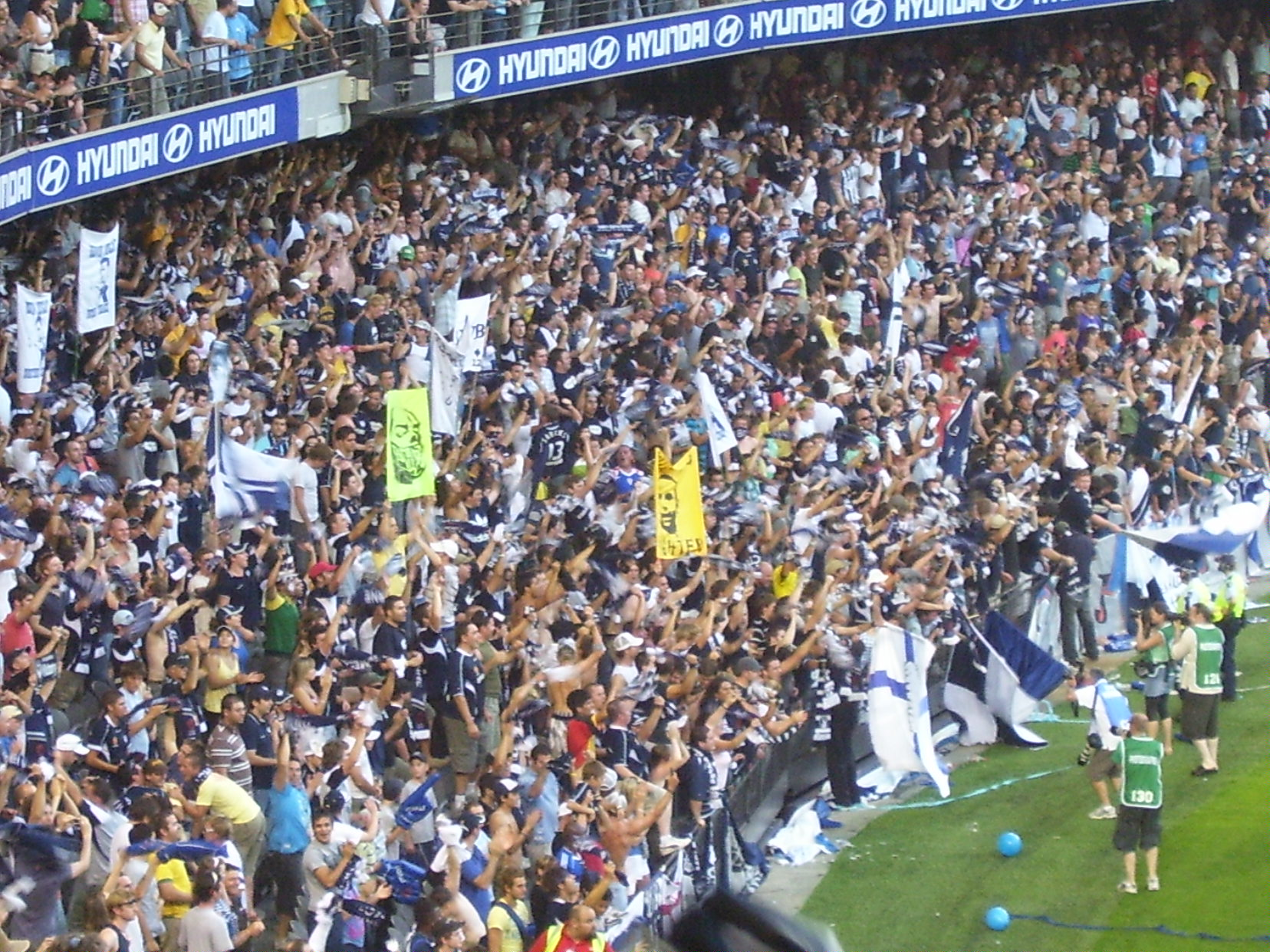
Melbourne Victory FC supporters at the 2007 A-League Grand Final

| Stadium | Club | Name |
|---|---|---|
| Coopers Stadium, Adelaide | Adelaide United FC | – Red Army |
| Suncorp Stadium, Brisbane | Brisbane Roar FC | – The Den |
| Industree Group Stadium, Gosford | Central Coast Mariners FC | – Yellow Army |
| Olympic Village, Heidelberg | Heidelberg United FC | – Megas Alexandros Army |
| City Vista Recreation Reserve, Fraser Rise | Caroline Springs George Cross FC | – George Cross Corner |
| AAMI Park, Melbourne | Melbourne Victory FC | – North Terrace |
| AAMI Park, Melbourne | Melbourne City FC | – Southside |
| Tompsett Stadium, Sunshine | Melbourne Knights FC | – Melbourne Croatia Fans |
| McDonald Jones Stadium, Newcastle | Newcastle Jets FC | – Terrace Novocastria |
| HBF Park, Perth | Perth Glory FC | – Shed End Perth, Perth Casuals |
| B.T. Connor Reserve, Reservoir | Preston Lions FC | – Preston Boys |
| Bicentennial Park South, Rockdale | Rockdale Ilinden FC | – Komiti Sydney |
| Lakeside Stadium, Albert Park | South Melbourne FC | – Clarendon Corner: Hellas Youth |
| Allianz Stadium, Sydney | Sydney FC | – The Cove |
| Belmore Sports Ground, Belmore | Sydney Olympic FC | – Olympic Misfits |
| Sydney United Sports Centre, Edensor Park | Sydney United 58 FC | – Sydney United Supporters |
| CommBank Stadium, Parramatta | Western Sydney Wanderers FC | – Red and Black Bloc, Northgate, AMOK, Westie Youth |
| Ironbark Fields, Tarneit | Western United FC | – Western Service Crew |
| Macedonia Park, Berkeley | Wollongong Wolves FC | – WolfDen |

=== New Zealand ===
| Stadium | Club | Name |
|---|---|---|
| Go Media Stadium, Auckland | Auckland FC | – The Port |
| Wellington Regional Stadium, Wellington | Wellington Phoenix | – Yellow Fever |

== North America ==
=== Canada ===
| Stadium | Club | Name |
|---|---|---|
| Stade Saputo | CF Montréal | – Collectif Impact Montréal |
| BMO Field | Toronto FC | – La Banda Toronto – Red Patch Boys |
| BC Place | Vancouver Whitecaps FC | – Vancouver Southsiders |
| ATCO Field | Cavalry FC | – Frontline Ultras |
| Wanderers Grounds | HFX Wanderers FC | – Block 108 Ultras |

=== United States ===
| Stadium | Club | Name |
|---|---|---|
| Audi Field | D.C. United | – District Ultras |
| PayPal Park | San Jose Earthquakes | – San Jose Ultras |
| Red Bull Arena | New York Red Bulls | – Torcida 96 |
| Subaru Park | Philadelphia Union | – Keystone Ultras |
| Lumen Field | Seattle Sounders FC | – Emerald City Supporters |
| America First Field | Real Salt Lake | – La Barra Real |
| Dignity Health Sports Park | Los Angeles Galaxy | – Angel City Brigade |
| Providence Park | Portland Timbers | – Timbers Army |
| BMO Stadium | Los Angeles FC | – The 3252 |
| Snapdragon Stadium | San Diego FC | – Frontera SD |
| Yankee Stadium | New York City FC | – Ultras NYC |
| Keyworth Stadium | Detroit City FC | – Northern Guard Supporters |
| Phoenix Rising Soccer Stadium | Phoenix Rising FC | – Los Bandidios Football Firm |
| Inter.co Stadium | Orlando City SC | – The Ruckus – Iron Lion Firm |
| One Spokane Stadium | Spokane Velocity | – 509 Syndicate |

=== Guatemala ===
| Stadium | Club | Name |
|---|---|---|
| Estadio Cementos Progreso | Comunicaciones FC | – VLTRA SVR – Anarkia Blanca – Los Fieles |
| Estadio Manuel Felipe Carrera | C.S.D. Municipal | – La Banda del Rojo – Mafia Roja – Ultras 5 Calderas |
| Estadio Guillermo Slowing | Aurora FC | – Los Califachos |
| Estadio Mario Camposeco | CSD Xelajú MC | – La Curva – Sexto Estado |
| Estadio Pensativo | Antigua GFC | – La Curva del Panza |
| Estadio David Cordón Hichos | CD Guastatoya | – Ultra Calvario |
| Estadio Carlos Salazar Hijo | CSD Suchitepéquez | – La Ultra Azul Venada – La J-10 |
| Estadio Verapaz | CD Cobán Imperial | – La 12 Ultra Azul – El Imperio 664 |
| Estadio Santa Lucía | C.D. Malacateco | – Ultra Toros |
| Estadio Municipal Santa Lucía Cotzumalguapa | F.C. Santa Lucía | – Ultra Azul |
| Estadio Marquesa de la Ensenada | C.D. Marquense | – Ultra León – Guerreros de la Ensenada |
| Estadio Municipal de Sanarate | Sanarate FC | – Ultra Celeste |
| Estadio Revolución | Universidad de San Carlos CF | – La Banda del Zope |
| Estadio Armando Barillas | Juventud Escuintleca | – La Trinchera del Toro |
| Estadio Doroteo Guamuch Flores | Guatemala | – La Barra de Guate |

=== El Salvador ===
| Stadium | Club | Name |
|---|---|---|
| Estadio Óscar Quiteño | C.D. FAS | – Turba Roja – Calejeros – Skizofrenos |
| Estadio Jorge "El Mágico" González | Alianza FC | – La Ultra Blanca – Barra Brava 96 – La Banda de la Capital |
| Estadio Juan Francisco Barraza | C.D. Águila | – La Inmortal 12 – La Banda de la Capital – Los Vagos |
| Estadio Sergio Torres | C.D. Luis Ángel Firpo | – Furia Pampera – Prisioneros de la Caldera |
| Estadio Jorge "Calero" Suárez | AD Isidro Metapán | – Furia Calera |
| Estadio Cuscatlán | C.D. Atlético Marte | – Furia Azul |

=== Honduras ===
| Stadium | Club | Name |
|---|---|---|
| Estadio Nacional Chelato Uclés | Club Deportivo Olimpia | – Ultra Fiel |
| Estadio Nacional Chelato Uclés | F.C. Motagua | – Ultras Motagua |
| Estadio General Francisco Morazán | Real C.D. España | – Brigadas |
| Estadio Yankel Rosenthal | C.D. Marathón | – Furia Verde |

=== Nicaragua ===
| Stadium | Club | Name |
|---|---|---|
| Estadio Cacique Diriangén | Diriangén FC | – Barra Cacique |
| Estadio Independencia | Real Estelí FC | – Barra Kamikaze |
| Estadio Olímpico del IND Managua | C.D. Walter Ferretti | – La Inigualable Banda Del ‘87 |
| Estadio Carlos Fonseca | Matagalpa FC | – Ultra 12 Septentrion |
| Estadio Municipal de Sébaco | Club Sport Sebaco | – Barra Brava |
| Estadio Alejandro Ramos | ART Municipal Jalapa | – Barras Muchas |
| Estadio Glorias del Beisbol Segoviano | Deportivo Ocotal | – Tu Barra Ultra Fieles |

=== Costa Rica ===
| Stadium | Club | Name |
|---|---|---|
| Estadio Alejandro Morera Soto | Liga Deportiva Alajuelense | – La 12 |
| Estadio Eladio Rosabal Cordero | C.S. Herediano | – La Garra Herediana |
| Estadio Ricardo Saprissa Aymá | Deportivo Saprissa | – La Ultra Morada |

=== Panama ===
| Stadium | Club | Name |
|---|---|---|
| Estadio Armando Dely Valdés | C.D. Árabe Unido | – Barra Atlantica |
| Estadio Maracaná (Panama) | C.D. Plaza Amador | – Barra Plazina |
| Cancha de Entrenamiento Luis Tapia | Sporting San Miguelito | – La Barra Académica |
| Estadio Agustín Sánchez | C.A. Independiente de La Chorrera | – Ultra Roja – Chicas Ultras |
| Estadio Rommel Fernández | Panama | – La Extrema Roja |

== Criticism ==
One point of criticism is that the capos strike up the songs, which makes spontaneous reactions to the ongoing game difficult. Plus, Ultras tend to sing longer songs instead of chants, which is not as motivating for the team.

Ultras play such a dominant role in many fan communities simply because there are no other groups that could challenge their status. The resulting misunderstanding, that the Ultras claim to have full control and authority over the fan section, repeatedly leads to conflicts between the Ultras and unorganized fans. These are often triggered by calls from individuals demanding that the Ultras, for example, keep their flags down (to avoid blocking the view).

Ultras are also criticized for physical assault, theft of fan materials such as flags or scarves, and the intimidation of non-Ultras. In addition, they face criticism for the use of pyrotechnics.

== In fiction ==
- Ultra (film), a 1991 Italian drama film
- Ultras (film), a 2020 Italian drama film

== See also ==
- Curva
- Hooligan
- Tifo
- Spion Kop
- Barra bravas
- Casuals
- List of association football rivalries
- List of hooligan firms
- Torcida organizada
- Football hooliganism
