= Ultras Spartak =

FC Spartak Trnava football supporters group

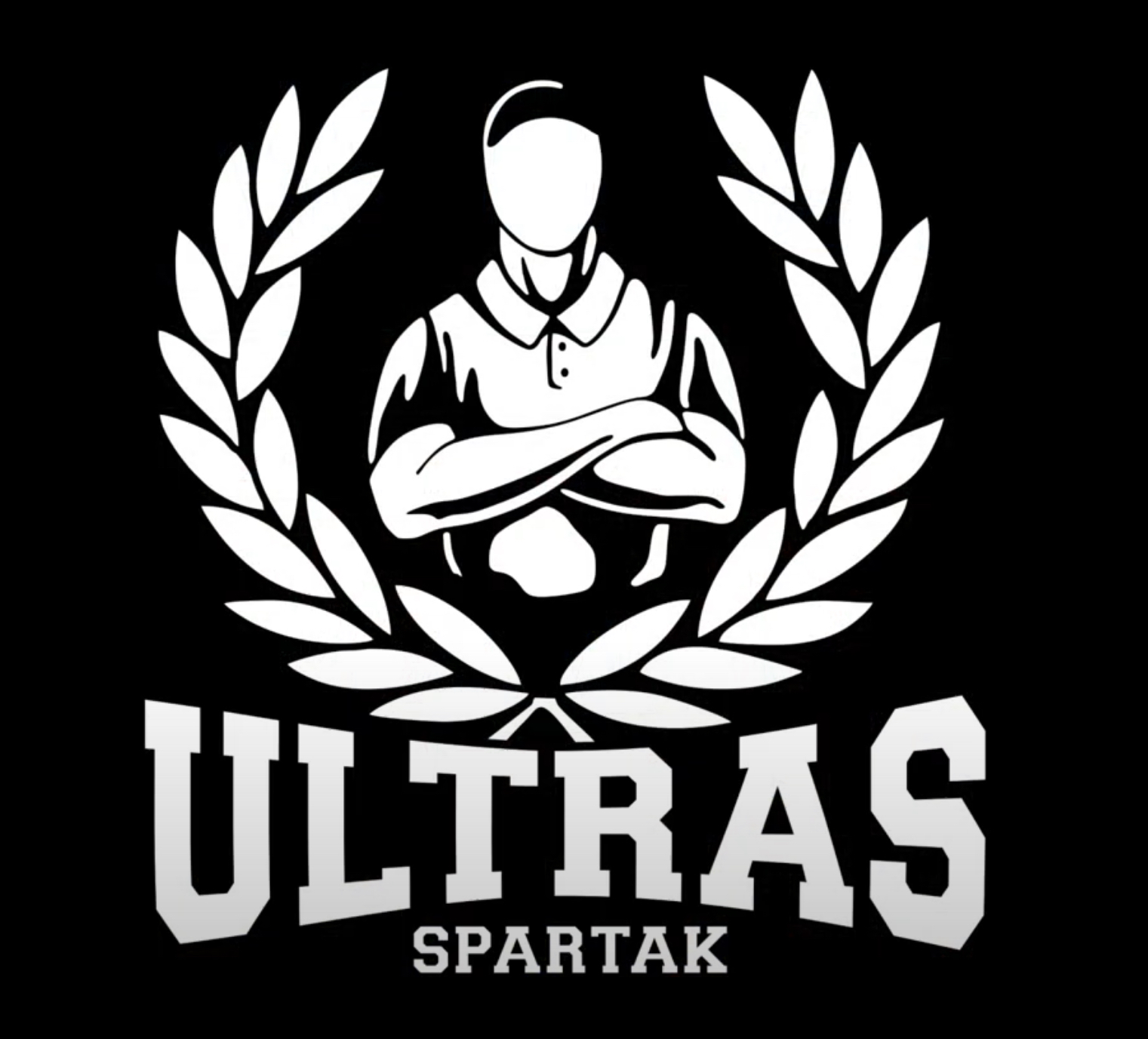
- Ultras Spartak logo
- Founded: 1988
- Type: Ultras group
- Clubs: Spartak Trnava
- Location: Trnava, Slovakia
- Stadium: Anton Malatinský Stadium
- Stand: Sector 3/ Ultras Sector
- Colours
- Website: https://www.facebook.com/UltrasSpartakTrnava/ (in Slovak)

Ultras Spartak are the organised supporters of the professional football club FC Spartak Trnava, and are considered one of the best fan groups in Slovakia.

== History ==
The history of the Ultras Spartak was first told mostly through word of mouth. A lot of the details have been kept in the books "50 Years of Trnava Football" and "60 Years of Trnava Football." The team that eventually became Spartak, known as TŠS Trnava, had a huge following in its first year. Its city rival, ŠK Trnava, were also doing well. After just one year, the two teams decided to merge to make Trnava football stronger. The next year, a new club from the working-class community showed up - ŠK Rapid Trnava. This team became popular with the people of Trnava. From the start, the derby games between ŠK Trnava and Rapid Trnava drew big crowds.

The initial group that resembled the current Ultras factions was established in the early 1990s. This group was named Alkyfans and, during its early days, was located in the south curve of the Trnava stadium prior to its renovation.

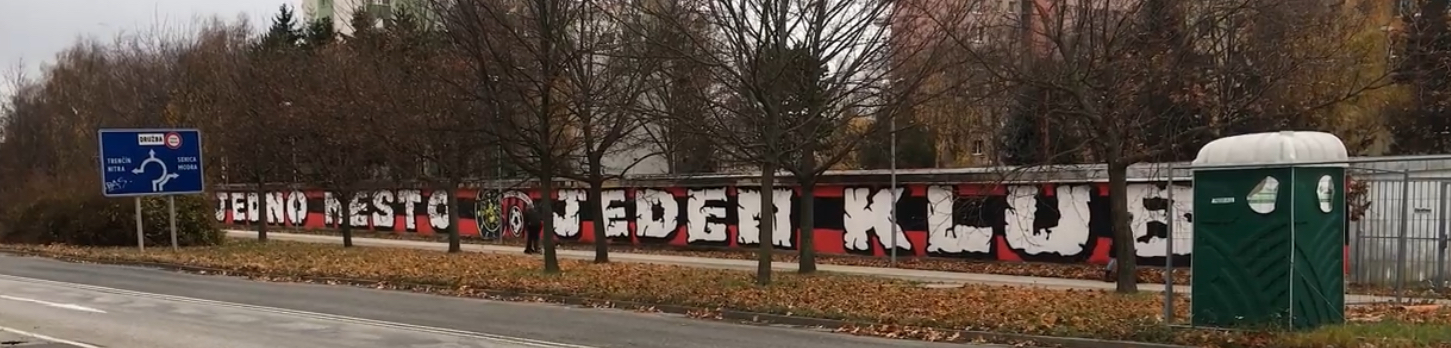
Graffiti near the city centre of Trnava which translates to “One city, one club”.

The fan club of Spartak Trnava is recognized as one of the official fan associations and has undergone several transformations over the years. It was established on April 10, 1966, under the name Spartaklub, which served as a social group for friends of TJ Spartak Kovosmalt Trnava. Following a period of forced inactivity, the club resumed its operations on February 18, 1988, adopting the title Club of Supporters of the Spartak TAZ Trnava. In the 1990s, it rebranded itself as the Fan Club of Spartak Trnava, boasting a membership of approximately 150 individuals. Presently, it operates under the name Ultras Spartak.

In 2008, together with the fan clubs OZ Belasá Šlachta, Fanklub MŠK Žilina, Ultras Nitra, Ultras Košice, Red-White Angels Banská Bystrica, Engerau Fans, Ultras Martin and Ultras Slovan, the fan club refused to attend the match between Slovakia and Poland in the 3rd European qualifying group for the World Cup. They cited the poor situation in Slovak football as the reason and called on people to consider attending this match.

== Friendships and Rivalries ==
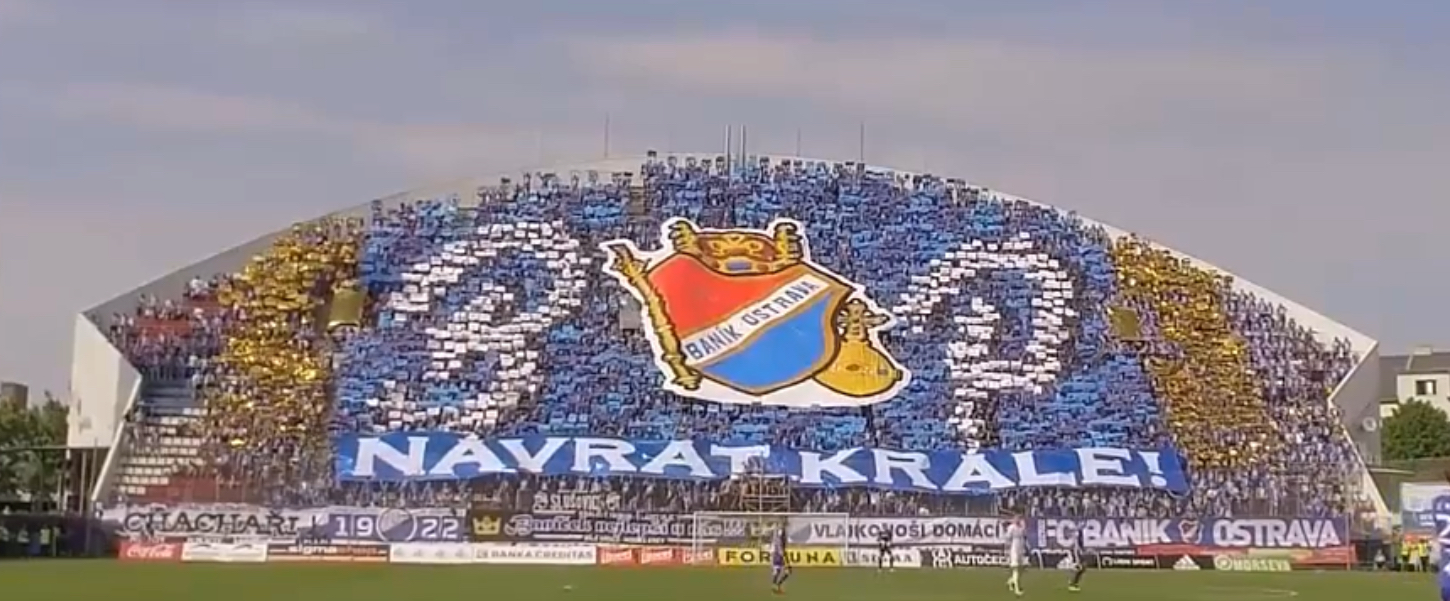
Baník Ostrava Ultras choreo

=== Friendships ===
Between 1988 and 2006, Ultras Spartak had a mutual friendship with Baník Ostrava fans. Good relations and friendship still persist to this day.

=== Rivalries ===
Ultras Spartak hold a fierce rivalry with Ultras Slovan, the main fan group of ŠK Slovan Bratislava. Both fan groups have been banned multiple times in Traditional derbys. In a match against Slovan in 2021, there was a full blown fight on the pitch between both ultras, with the game being cancelled and postponed. As a result of this incident, Spartak would have to play the next three home matches without the Ultras, with entry only allowed for children under 15 years of age.

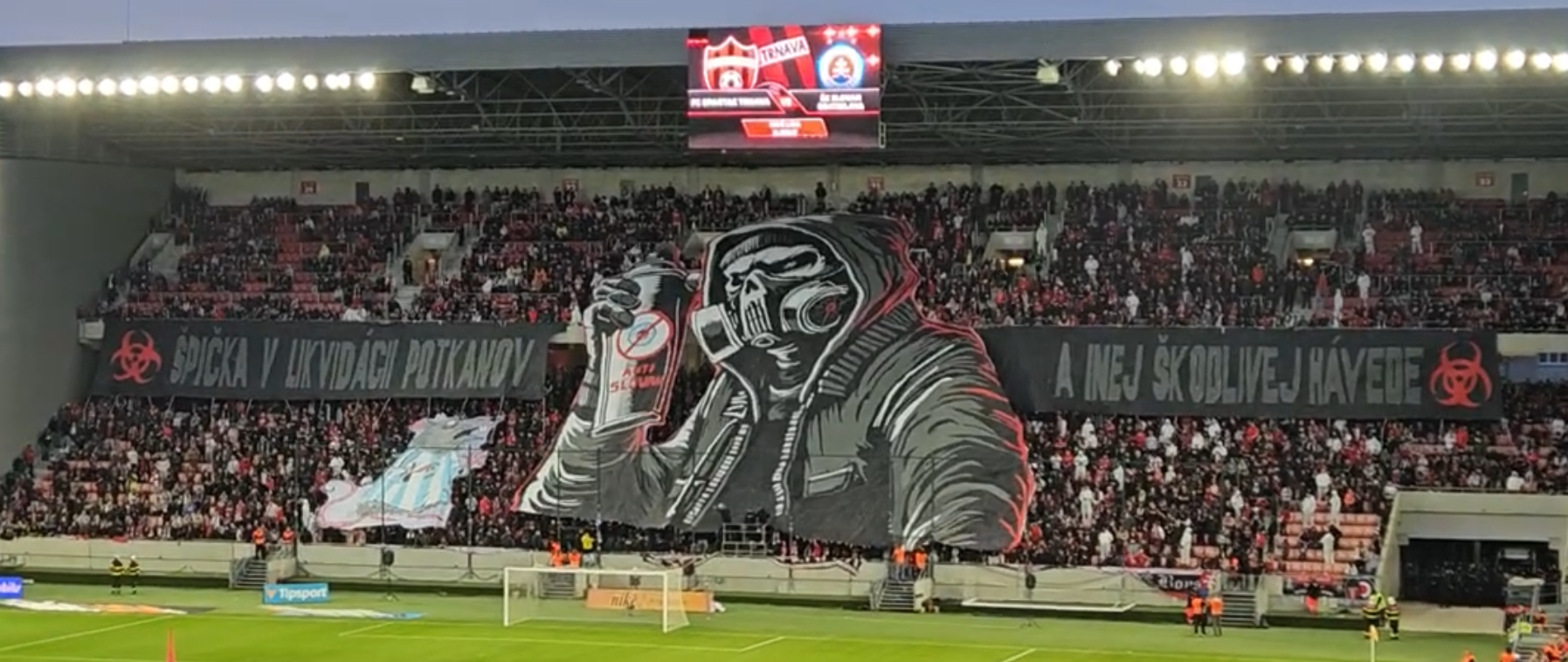
Ultras Spartak choreo in Traditional derby against Slovan Bratislava.

== Ideology ==
Ultras Spartak are against the use of knives during games. The fans boycotted a 2024–25 Conference League qualifier match against Wisła Kraków because the club’s ultras did not sign the agreement that weapons should not be used in football.

== Choreography ==
Ultras Spartak are well known for their choreography, it takes all night to prepare an all stand choreo, sometimes even three days. It is produced by volunteers in their free time.

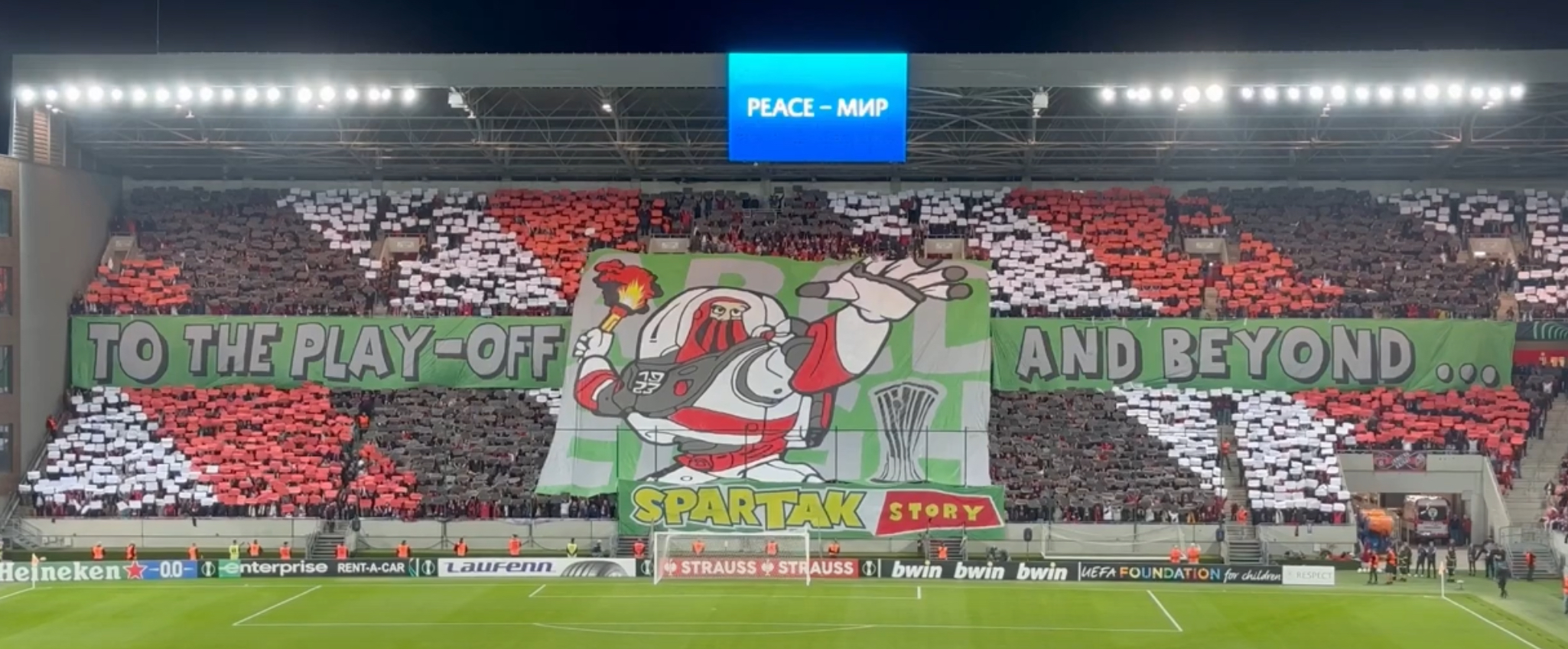
Ultras Spartak choreography against Fenerbahçe in the 2023-24 Conference League.

Types of choreo’s are:

- Cardboard choreo ("kartónovačka") - a visual creation made up of multiple sheets of paper in different sizes and colors. This type of choreo necessitates a larger group of participants.
- Burning-through choreo ("prepalovačka") - a transparent film featuring various shapes and sizes adorned with paintings or writings, typically enhanced by light effects. The burning-through choreo can be executed in two ways: either elevated above the fans' heads or suspended from railings or fences.
- Argentina ("Argentína") - involves the act of throwing small pieces of paper and confetti into the air.
- Sector choreo ("sektorovka") - a large sheet of paper or another material displaying various paintings or writings, held above the heads of attendees directly on the terraces.
- Live choreo - in contrast to the previously mentioned types, this is generally executed using the clothing of fans during a match, where they often wear items such as T-shirts, raincoats, caps, and similar apparel. Live choreo is performed infrequently due to its high cost.

== Gallery ==
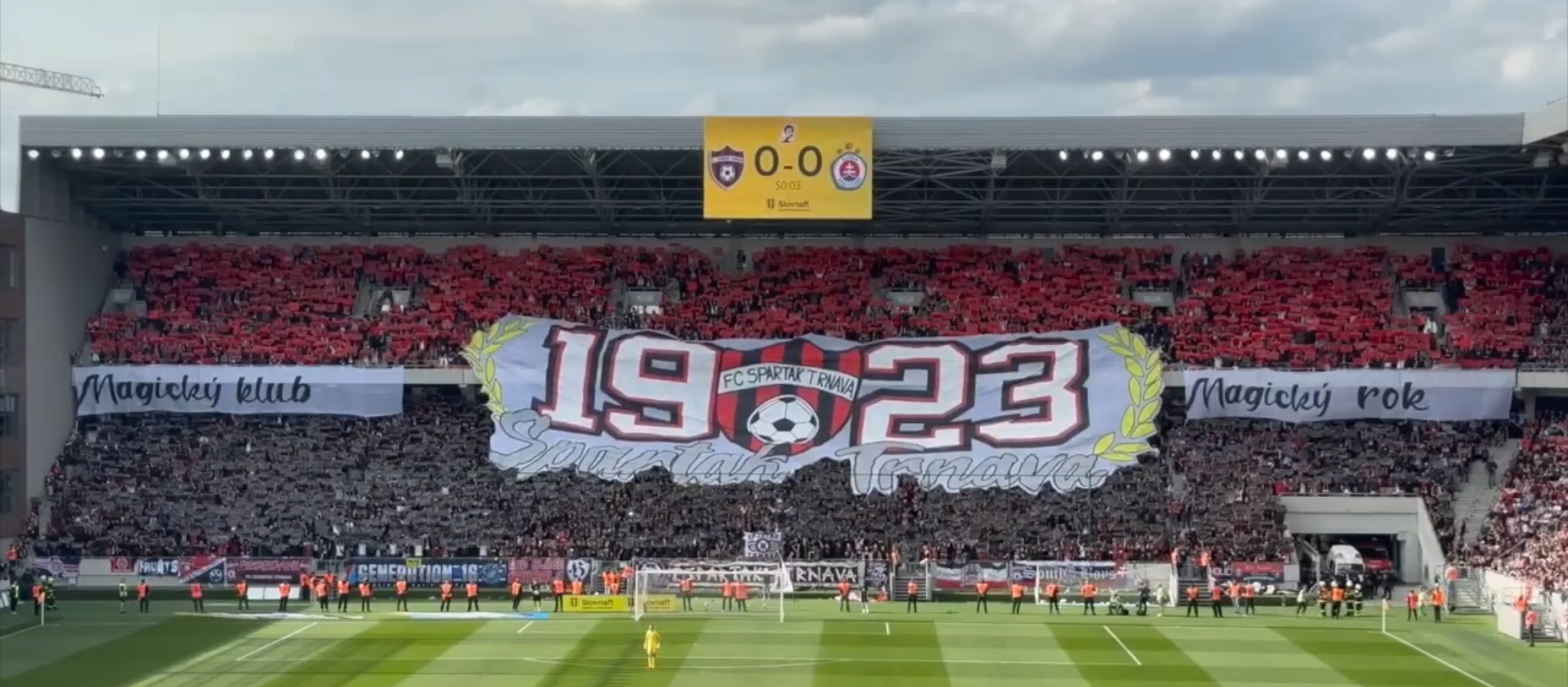
Ultras choreo against Slovan Bratislava in cup final.

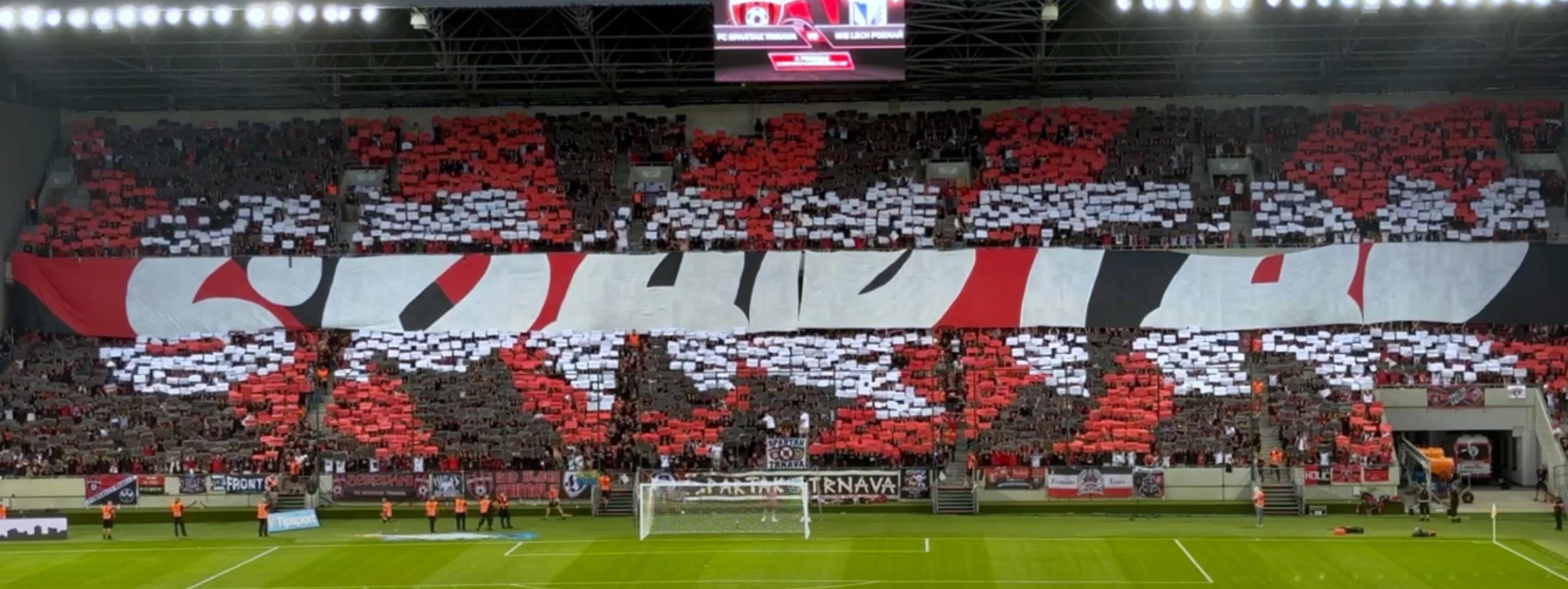
Choreo against Lech Poznań.

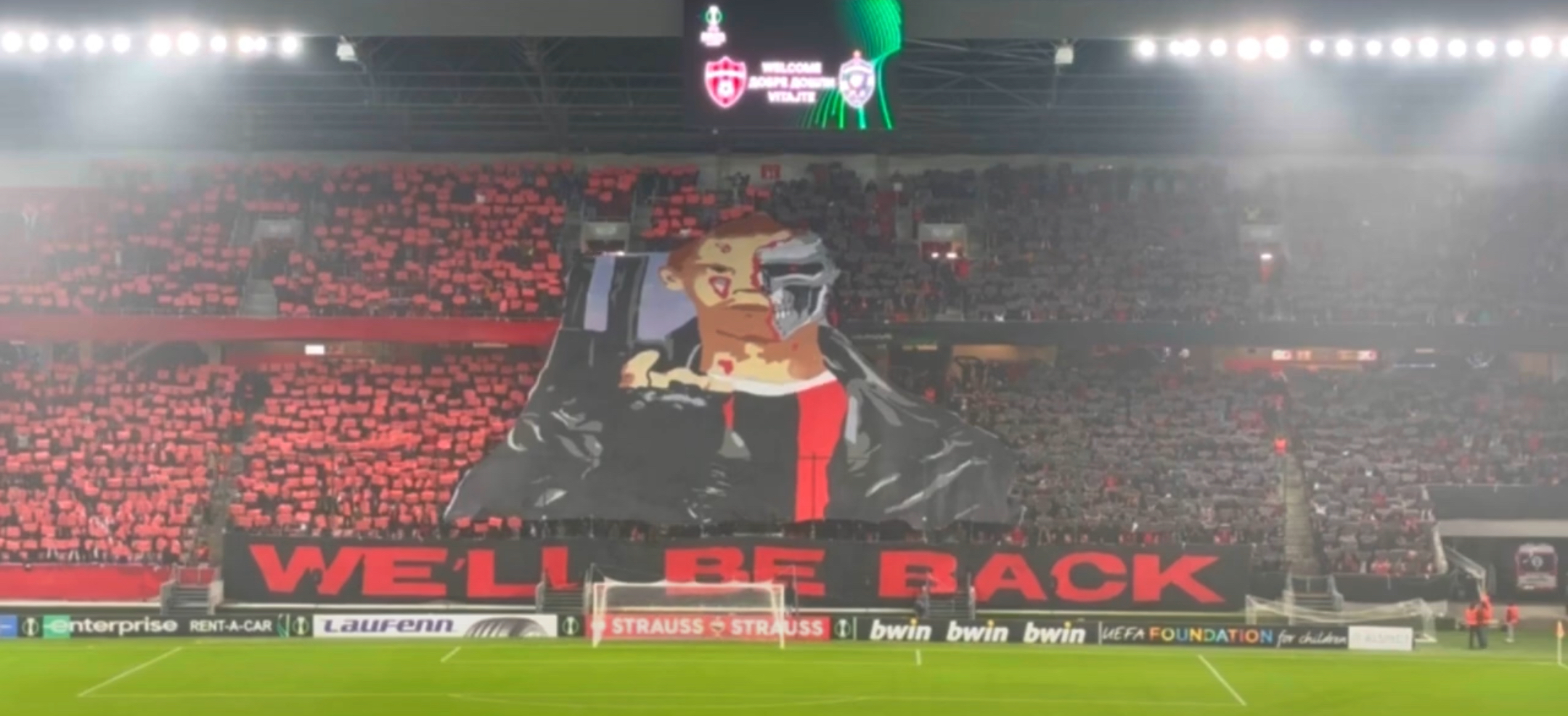
Choreo in the last European match in 2023.

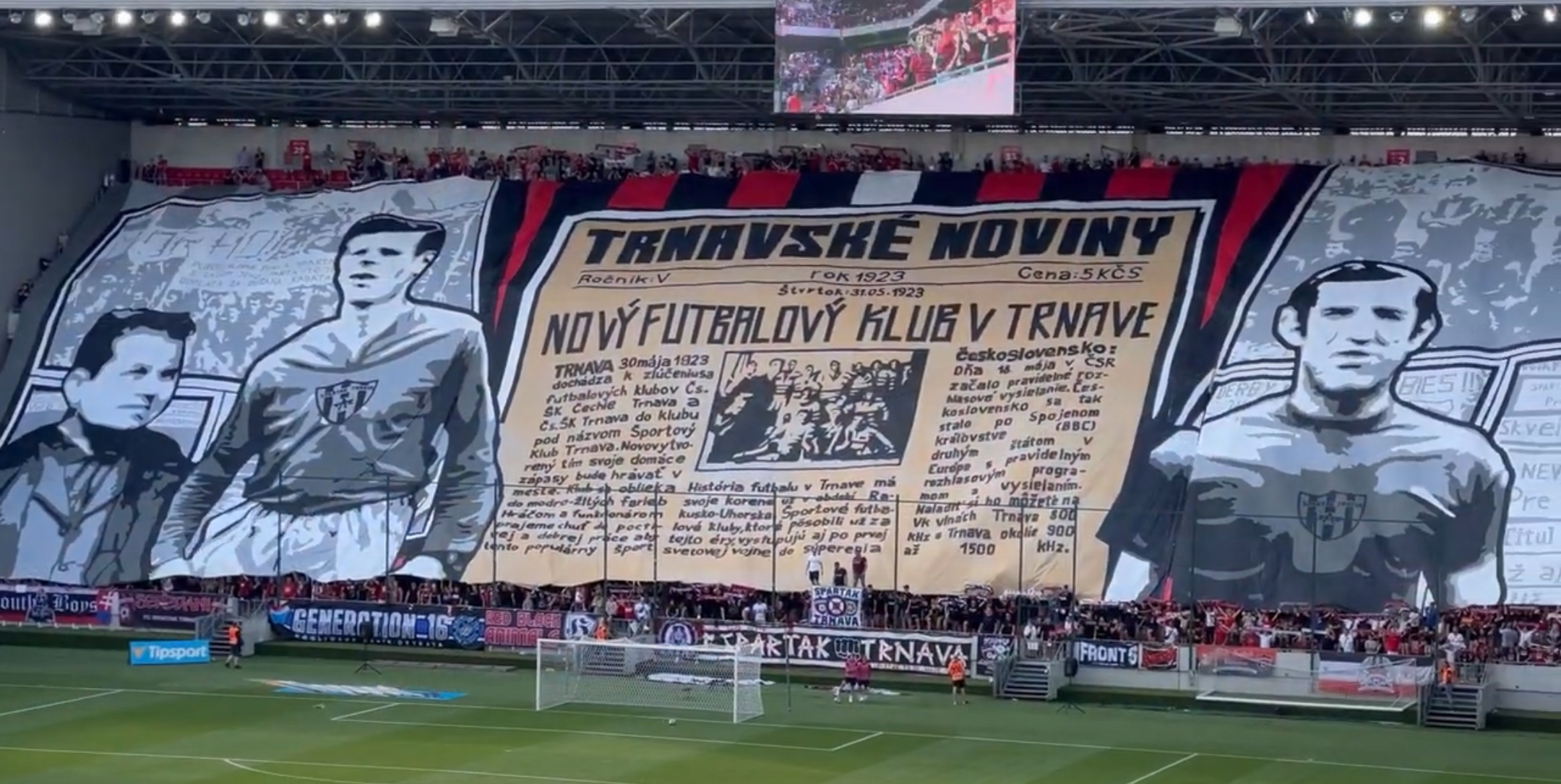
All stand choreo against Valencia

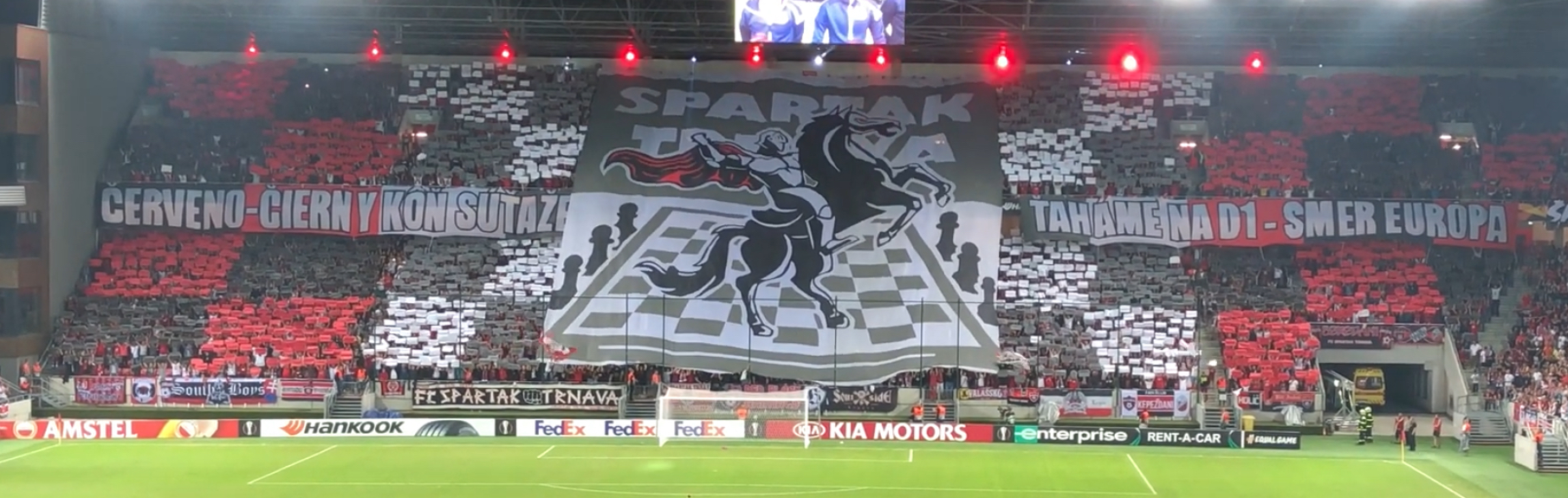
Choreo in 2018 against Anderlecht.

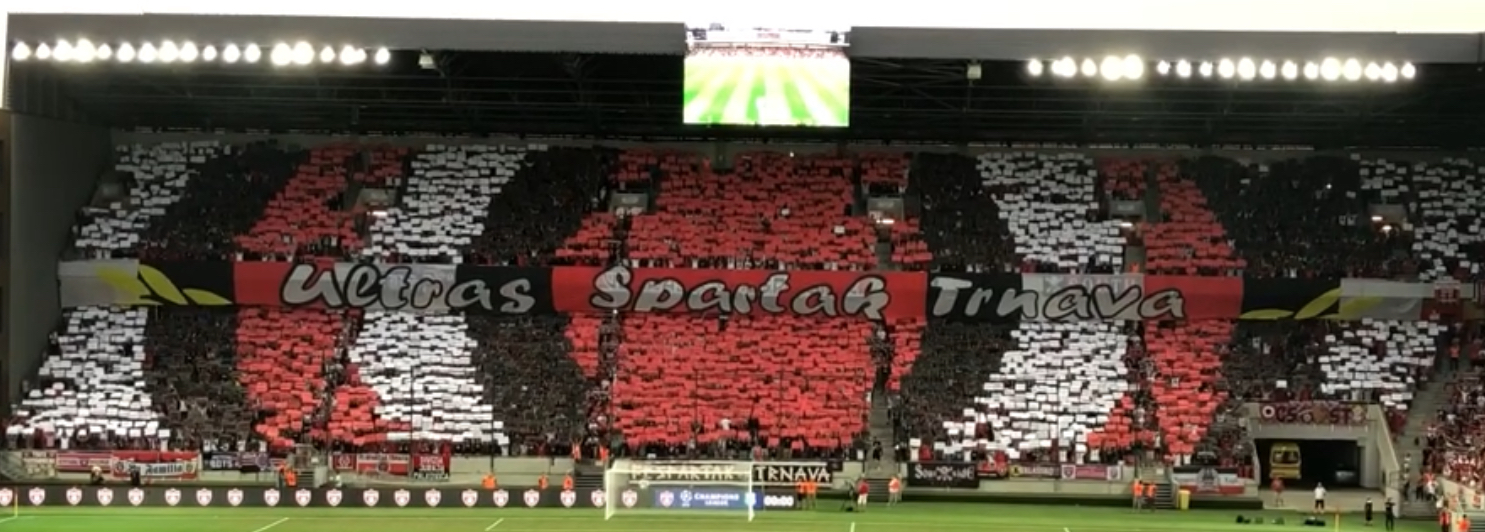
Choreo against Legia Warsaw.
