= Juventud Escuintleca =

Guatemalan football club

Escuintleca
- Full name: Club Social y Deportivo Escuintleca
- Ground: Estadio Armando Barillas
- Capacity: 3,000
- Manager: (Guatemala) José Antonio Archila
- League: Primera División de Ascenso
- 2010 Clausura Grupo A: 1.ro

Club Social y Deportivo Escuintleca, also known as Juventud Escuintleca, is a Guatemalan football club based in Escuintla, Escuintla Department. They play their home games in the Estadio Armando Barillas. The club won its promotion to the top league after winning 2 first division titles in a row. Immediately after the club won the promotion, the owner decided to fire most of the team, including the coach, except the 2 captains Mario Archila and Abner Lara, two young players recently hired by the new management. Bad ownership has led to a last place standing in the current season. The club owner once again fired 5 of its players after a 4–0 defeat to Guatemalan heavyweight CSD Municipal, which resulted in a 6th player quitting in protesta.

== History ==
Most recently they have again been playing in the Primera División Group "A" or "B". The club was able to gain promotion to the top Guatemalan league after winning the second and first division championships.

== Current squad ==
Note: Flags indicate national team as defined under FIFA eligibility rules; some limited exceptions apply. Players may hold more than one non-FIFA nationality.

No.	Pos.	Nation	Player
—	MF	(Guatemala) GUA	Axel Cifuentes
—	MF	(Guatemala) GUA	Luis Alay
—		(Guatemala) GUA	Angel Hurtarte
—		(Guatemala) GUA	Arturo Besestre
—		(Guatemala) GUA	Christian Blanco
—		(Guatemala) GUA	Cristian Estrada
—		(Guatemala) GUA	Christian Jiménez
—		(Guatemala) GUA	Christian Bernabé
—		(Guatemala) GUA	Jorge Padilla
—		(Guatemala) GUA	Juan Juárez
—		(Guatemala) GUA	Juan Manuel Trujillo
—		(Costa Rica) CRC	Luis Mora
—		(Guatemala) GUA	Mario Ramírez

No.	Pos.	Nation	Player
—		(Guatemala) GUA	Mike Payes
—		(Guatemala) GUA	Maynor Soto
—		(Guatemala) GUA	Omar Aja
—		(Guatemala) GUA	Rigo Fuentes
—		(Guatemala) GUA	Rudy Roldán
—		(Guatemala) GUA	Walter Oliva
—		(Guatemala) GUA	Wilfred Roldán
—		(Colombia) COL	Wilmar Mena
—		(Guatemala) GUA	Levisan de León
—		(Guatemala) GUA	Rony Trigueros
—		(Guatemala) GUA	Helber Callejas
—		(Guatemala) GUA	Juan Francisco de León
—		(Brazil) BRA	Ederick Manuel Ardòn Marroquin

== List of coaches ==
- (Guatemala) Eddy Misael (2011)
