= Armando Barillas Stadium =

Stadium in Escuintla, Guatemala

Coordinates: 14.3128°N 90.7833°W

Estadio Armando Barillas
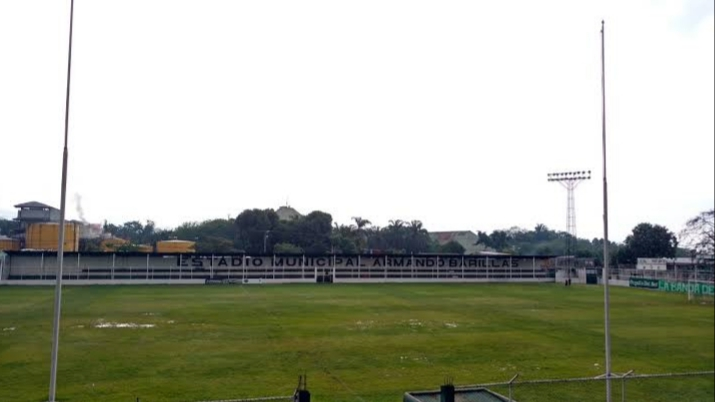
- Interactive map of Estadio Armando Barillas
- Location: Escuintla, Guatemala
- Capacity: 10,000
- Surface: Grass
- Field size: 104 m × 68 m (341 ft × 223 ft)

Construction
- Opened: 1954

Tenants
- Juventud Escuintleca; CD Naranjeros Escuintla (2020–present)

Armando Barillas Stadium (Spanish: Estadio Armando Barillas) is a soccer stadium located in Escuintla, Guatemala. It was built in 1954 and seats 10,000.

The stadium temporarily housed over 1,000 displaced civilians following the 2018 Volcán de Fuego eruption.
