= La Guardia Imperial =

Argentine football barra brava

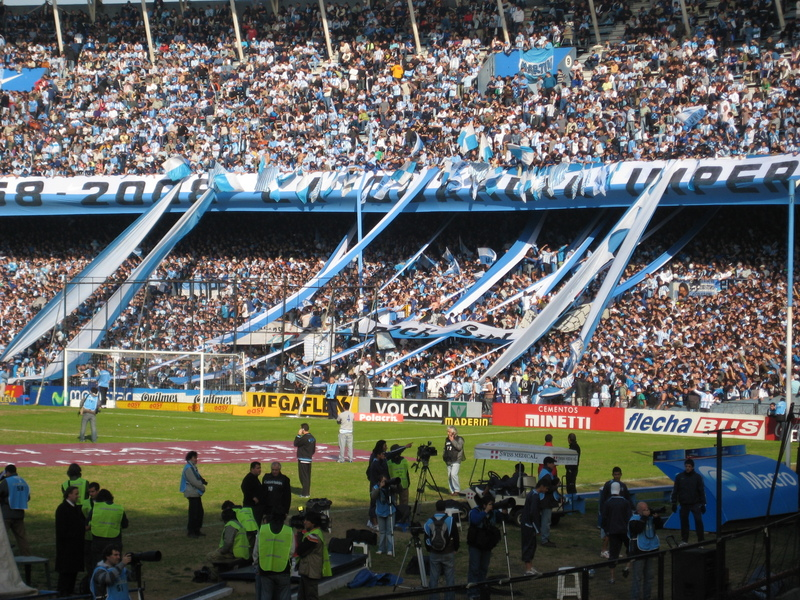
- Abbreviation: LGI
- Founded: 1958; 68 years ago
- Type: Supporters' group
- Team: Racing
- Location: Avellaneda, Argentina
- Arena: El Cilindro
- Stand: South (at home)
- Colors

La Guardia Imperial (Spanish pronunciation: [la gwaɾðja impeɾjal]; English: The Imperial Guard) is an Argentine barra brava group associated with Racing Club de Avellaneda. It is widely regarded as one of the largest and most influential football supporter groups in Argentina, according to local media.

The name La Guardia Imperial refers to both Racing supporters—also known as Hinchada Número Uno (English: Number One Fanbase or simply N.°1)—and its main hooligan group, founded in 1958. In the 1990s, the Racing Stones (named after the English band The Rolling Stones) and La Barra del 95 (English: The 95 Firm; named after a bus line in Greater Buenos Aires) emerged alongside it. Together, they form an organized group traditionally based in the South Stand of El Cilindro stadium.

== History ==
In the 1940s, Argentine journalist Luis María Albamonte, also known as Américo Barrios, gave Racing Club de Avellaneda fans the nickname La Guardia Imperial (The Imperial Guard). He compared them to Napoleon's French Imperial Guard, portraying them as resilient and fiercely devoted supporters.

Racing Club’s hooligan group was formed in 1958, but it wasn’t until 1983 that they officially adopted the name La Guardia Imperial. Before that, they were simply called La Barra de la Bandera (The Flag Crew).

In the late 1990s, La Guardia Imperial, along with regular Racing fans (not just hooligans), united to prevent the judicial auction of the club’s headquarters in the Villa del Parque neighborhood of Buenos Aires. They also became known for gathering massive crowds at El Cilindro, even on non-match days, such as March 7, 1999. One of their most famous moments came in 2001, when Racing fans filled two stadiums at the same time during the final match of the Apertura 2001 season.

They pulled off the same feat in 2024, when Racing won the Copa Sudamericana against Cruzeiro, with thousands of fans celebrating both in Asunción (Paraguay), where the final was played, and in Avellaneda.

Today, multiple factions compete for control of the group after a split in 2002. For years, a faction based in Dock Sud dominated the scene, but now, a group from the Villa Corina shantytown in Avellaneda, known as Los Pibes de Racing (The Racing Lads), has taken the lead.

== Violence ==
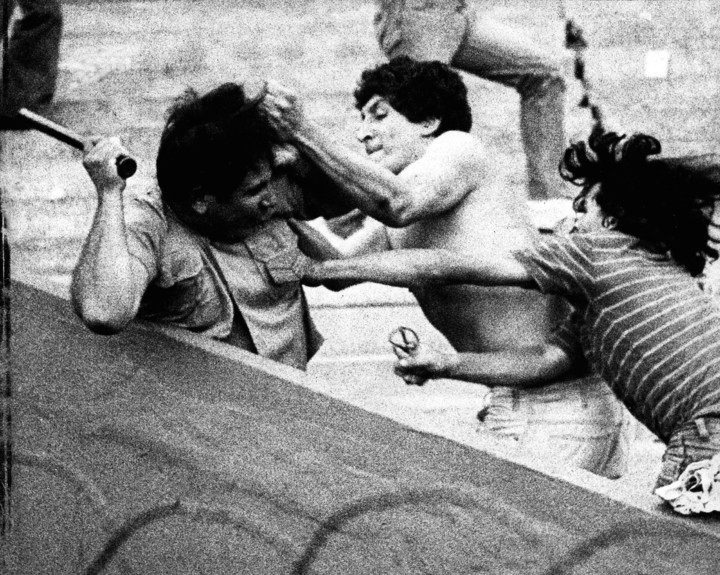
Violent battle between the stadium police and La Guardia Imperial (1983)

The hooligan group associated with Racing, La Guardia Imperial, traces its origins back to 1958. Initially notorious for stealing flags and symbols from rival teams, they gained infamy in 1967 when the theft of a Huracán umbrella led to the death of a Racing Club supporter, Héctor Souto. Prior to that, they had already been involved in violent incidents, such as the disturbances at San Lorenzo’s stadium in 1958, which led to Racing Club’s ground being suspended for several matches.

Over time, tensions escalated between La Guardia Imperial and La Doce, Boca Juniors' hooligan faction. These hostilities reached a breaking point in August 1983, when Racing fan Roberto Basile was fatally injured during a match at La Bombonera. In response, La Guardia Imperial abandoned the stadium, vowing revenge.

In December 1983, Racing Club was relegated to Argentina’s second division. A tense match against Racing de Córdoba resulted in violent clashes between Racing supporters and the police. Horacio "Cacho de Ciudadela" Baldo, a prominent hooligan leader, played a key role in the unrest.

During Racing's stint in the second division, their hooligan group formed an alliance with Gimnasia y Esgrima La Plata, united by a mutual rivalry with Estudiantes de La Plata.

Racing returned to the top tier in December 1985, but their comeback was overshadowed by tragedy. Boca Juniors’ hooligans murdered Racing fan Daniel Souto, further intensifying hooligan tensions across Argentina.

In 1988, violence erupted once again during a match against Boca Juniors at El Cilindro. A fan launched an explosive device near Boca goalkeeper Carlos Navarro Montoya, prompting La Guardia Imperial to defiantly chant in response. The match was immediately suspended, and Boca Juniors were controversially awarded the points.

In 1990, rumours surfaced linking Racing’s hooligans to the death of a Boca Juniors supporter, though no conclusive evidence was found.

Despite their long-standing feud with La 12, La Guardia Imperial's primary rivals remain Independiente’s hooligan group, La Barra del Rojo. While a degree of respect once existed between the factions —rooted in an "old-school" code of hand-to-hand combat— tensions escalated following the murder of Racing supporter Waldo Rodríguez in 1997.

In 2002, ahead of the Avellaneda derby, conflict erupted once more. Shots were fired from within the stadium La Doble Visera towards a quincho (outdoor gathering space) where La Guardia Imperial leaders had assembled. In retaliation, enraged Racing hooligans stormed Cordero Street (now Ricardo Bochini Avenue) next to Independiente’s stadium, where they fatally assaulted Gustavo Rivero, an Independiente supporter.

By 2006, violence had escalated to such an extent that both Avellaneda derbies were classified as high-risk matches, with authorities citing widespread hooliganism as a serious concern.

== Flags ==
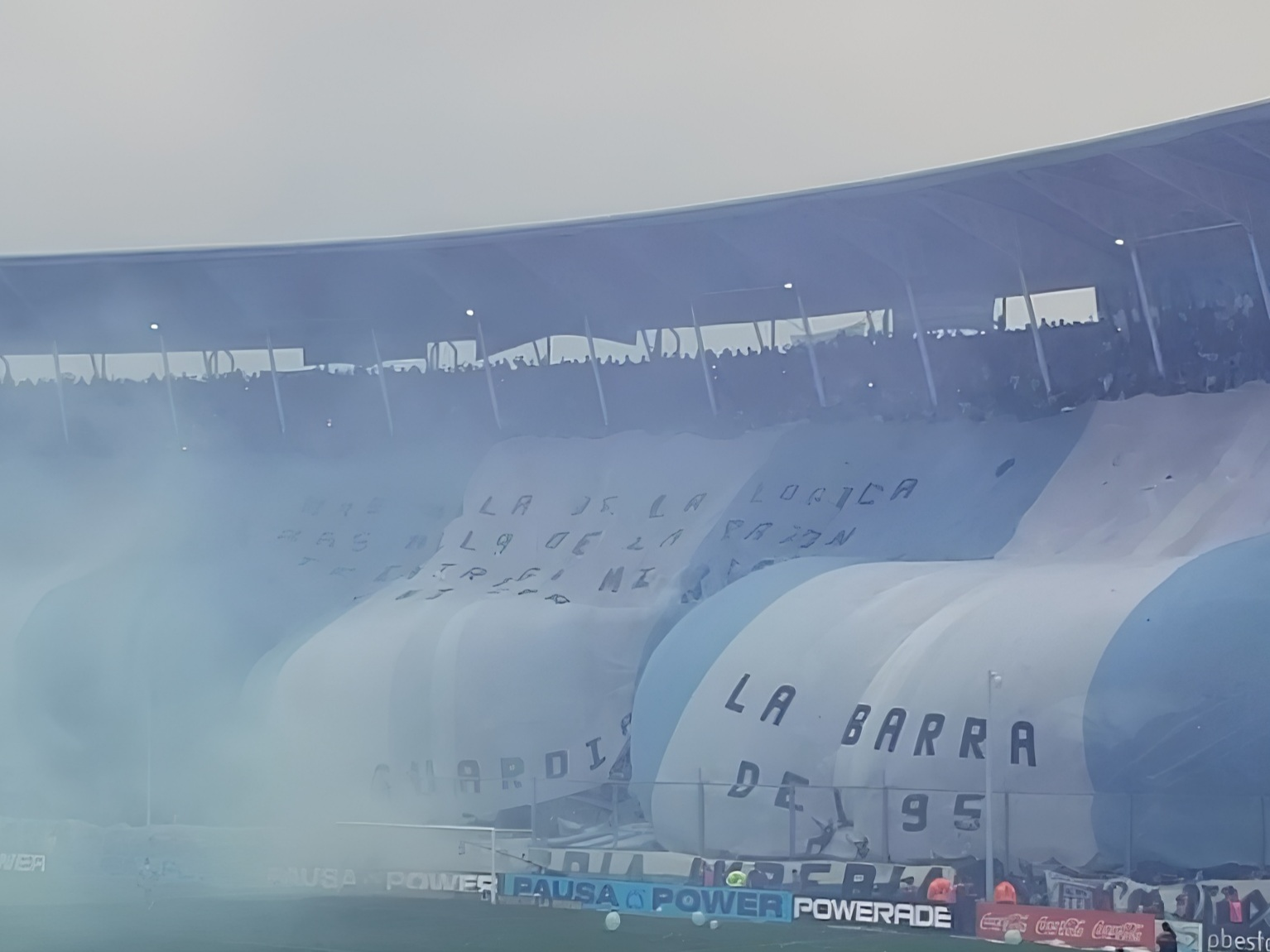
Most biggest flag of Racing Club, released in 1997 (2022)

Despite their turbulent reputation, Racing Club's hooligan faction showcases two of the biggest flags ever seen in a football stadium. The first made its debut during the 1997 Copa Libertadores match against River Plate. The second was unveiled during a 2010 game against All Boys in the Argentine Primera División.

== In popular culture ==
There's a tango called A la Guardia Imperial, composed by José Colángelo, as a tribute to the renowned group of Racing Club supporters.

== See also ==
- Racing Club de Avellaneda
