= La barra del Rojo =

Argentine football barra brava

La Barra del Rojo
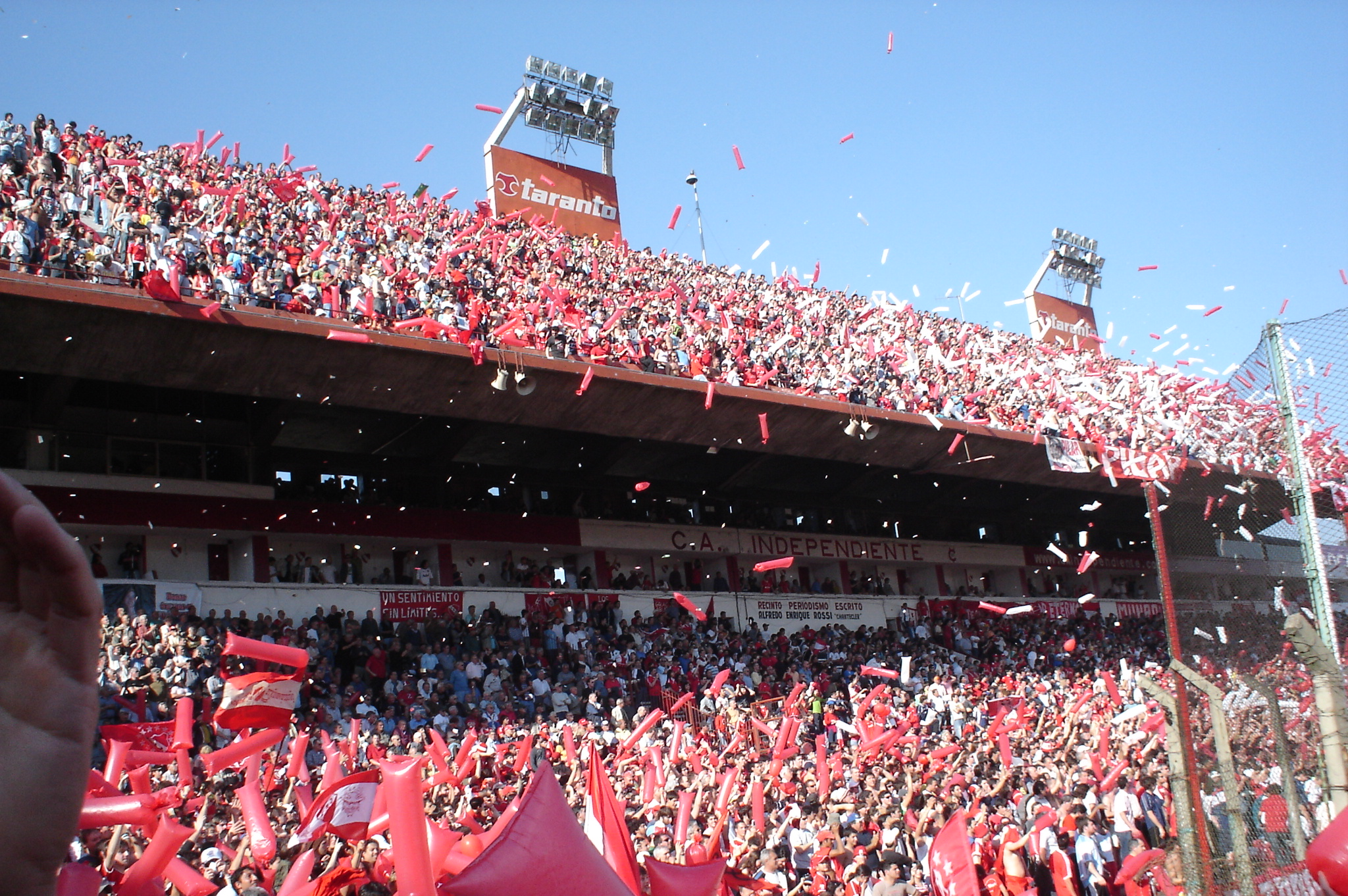
- Type: Supporters' group
- Location: Avellaneda, Greater Buenos Aires, Argentina
- Arena: Estadio Libertadores de América
- Stand: North (at home)
- Colors

La Barra Del Rojo is the barra brava of the Club Atlético Independiente. They are unusual in Argentina in that they do not have a nickname. It is considered as the largest and strongest barra brava in Argentina. The existence of this group has been publicly known since the 1950s. Besides attending Independiente matches, since 1982, the core members of the group attend the national team's World Cups. They also sometimes attend the Copa América.

== Composition ==
Although La Barra Del Rojo work as a united group, it consists of a large number of sub-groups, which come from neighborhoods throughout Avellaneda, the rest of the Greater Buenos Aires, Buenos Aires, La Plata and the Greater La Plata. These sub-groups generally carry the names of their neighborhoods or cities of origin, or the nicknames of their bosses. The most important are: Fiorito, La Tranquila, La Banda de San Justo, Los Polacos, Los camioneros, Villa Corina, Los Rana, Los Bera, Los Narigones, Los Gerlis, La 4 de Julio, La Pepsi, etc.; all of them come from the most dangerous villas miserias and poor neighborhoods of cities like Avellaneda, Buenos Aires, San Justo, Berazategui, Sarandí, Merlo, Villa Domínico, Wilde, Lanús, Claypole, Quilmes, Villa Fiorito, Lomas de Zamora, Banfield, La Plata, etc.

Within the barra brava, there is a pecking order. The "first line", consisting in fewer than 10 persons, is formed by the bosses (headed by the leader), who are the chiefs of the major sub-groups. A requisite for becoming a boss is to have been a member of the group for at least 10 years. They are responsible for the organization and the distribution of money and tasks within the barra brava. The "second line", ranging from 15 to 30 people, is formed by the chiefs and important members of the rest of the sub-groups. They take care of recruiting people, study the area and the movements of the enemy barras bravas, and hire buses for the transfer of group members. The "third line", consisting of about 400 people, it consists of the following members in the range, behind the leaders in each sub-groups. They already have some years in the barra brava, but are not yet part of the core. They handle the drums and flags. The "fourth line", or rest of the barra brava, (over 1000 people), is responsible simply to follow the above "lines", and can not make decisions. Everybody is in a sub-group and when there is a fight against another barra brava; all the "lines" must participate.

Most members of La Barra Del Rojo form part of the working class. The current leader of the barra brava is Pablo "Bebote" ("Big Baby") Álvarez, who took the lead in 2004.

== Financing ==
Their main means of financing include the resale of tickets, drugs, the role of one sub-group as "shock troop" for some political unions (CGT and the Syndicate of Truck Drivers), and threatening the directors and players of the club.

According to 2006 research reports, "Polaco" (the chief of the sub-group Los Polacos and one of the leaders of Los Diablos Rojos) was the bodyguard of Hugo Moyano (the secretary general of the CGT) 15 years ago and still holds that role.

In 2003, an investigation said that the barra brava earned between 40000 and 45000 pesos per month.

== Violence ==
During its existence, the barra brava has had several fights and altercations with the Argentine police and with other barras bravas, especially with that of Racing de Avellaneda (La Guardia Imperial), Independiente's main football rival; it also had major confrontations with the barras bravas of Boca Juniors (La 12), River Plate (Los Borrachos del Tablón) and San Lorenzo de Almagro (La Gloriosa), also rivals of the club. However, any barra brava of other team is targeted as an enemy, even if there is no football-related rivalry.

On 17 October 2006, during the procession for the transfer of the coffin of ex-president Juan Domingo Perón from the La Chacarita cemetery (in the city of Buenos Aires) to a mausoleum in a summer residence in San Vicente, some members of La Barra Del Rojo became involved (among them Jorge "Madonna" Quiroz) in a fight instigated by Peronist trade unions over access to the ceremony (some sub-groups of the barra brava belong to the CGT and the Syndicate of Truck Drivers, both Peronist). Is believed that the fight started because there were several members of the barras bravas of Estudiantes de La Plata and Defensores de Cambaceres in the UOCRA (another Peronist union then present). The police were able to contain the violence enough for the ceremony to finish.

In 1997, a member of La Barra Del Rojo was indicted for the murder of Walter Rodríguez, and in 2001, the death of another fan of Racing Club was attributed to the barra brava. Both victims were members of La Guardia Imperial.

In 2004 in Quito, Ecuador, the barra brava fought the Ecuadorian police during a Copa Libertadores match between El Nacional and Independente in the Atahualpa stadium. As a result of the incident, two supporters of Independiente was arrested. They were released two days later.

== See also ==
- Club Atlético Independiente
- Barra brava
- Football hooliganism
