= Torcida Jovem =

Supporters' group for Santos FC

- Established: 26 September 1969
- Type: Supporters' group
- Team: Santos FC
- Motto: with Santos FC wherever and however he is
- Location: Aricanduva
- President: André Vinícius "Deko"
- Vice President: Eduardo Carvalho (Tité)
- Board of Directors: Paulo Roberto (Fafu) (First flag director) Paulinho Cruz (Second flag director) Hércules (First secretary) Rafael Sena (Second secretary) Fábio Galan (First treasurer) Gilberto (Nenê) (Second treasurer) Amilton Silva (Public relations) Rafael Dias (Sports director) Jefferson (Social director and promotions) Leonardo Santos (Bambu) (First battery director) André (Deko) (Second battery director)
- Membership: 80,000+
- Colors: White and Black
- Website: torcidajovem.com.br

The Torcida Jovem (English: Young Supporters; Portuguese pronunciation: [toʁˈsidɐ ˈʒɔvẽ]) are a torcida organizada, or supporters' group, for Santos FC, a Brazilian professional football club based in Santos, Brazil. Founded in 1969 by a group of fans from São Paulo, (Note: Address Headquarters and Gymnasium of Torcida Jovem of Santos FC: Rua Doutor Luís Carlos, 1 - Jardim Aricanduva - CEP: 03405-100 - East Zone of São Paulo.) the group set out to make it a goal to attend every match that the club played in the capital of São Paulo. With over 70,000 members, it is one of the largest supporting groups in Brazil. The current president is André Vinícius "Deko". Grêmio Recreativo Cultural Social Escola de Samba Torcida Jovem, popularly known simply as Torcida Jovem, is a samba school from São Paulo, Brazil.

== History ==
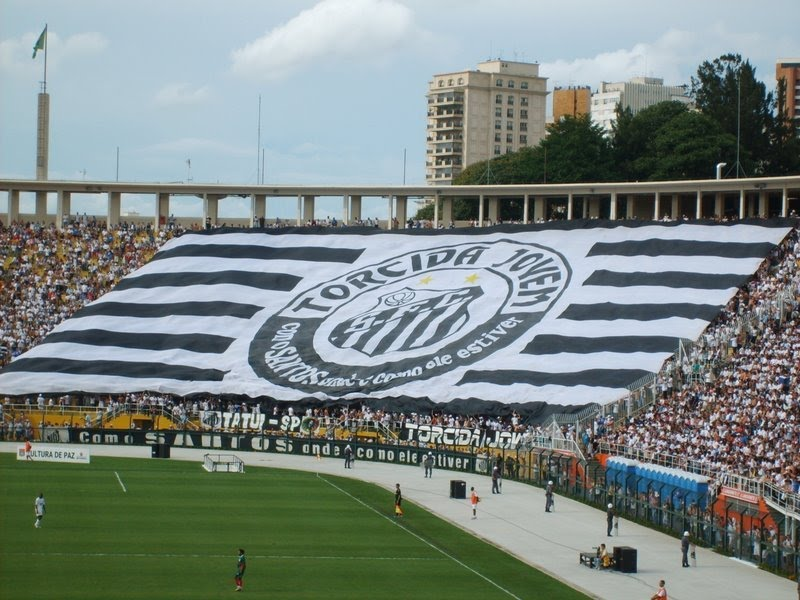
Big flag of Torcida Jovem

During the late 1960s when Santos FC fan base did not extend beyond the limits of the city of Santos, a group of men made a point to attend every game the team played in São Paulo. After a few matches, the group began to arrange together trips to any state venue to popularize the idea o support the club, and negate the provocations of other rival fans. The habit of attending the club's matches en masse became so common that in 1969 they decided to give birth to a uniformed, official supporters group that attended every game the team disputes. Thirteen individuals were the driving force behind the creation of Torcida Jovem, with Cosmo Damião, German, Toboggan, Menezes, Celso Jatene, Mestre Pedrão, China, Chacrinha, Magrão, Zuca, Almir and Zé Miguel being the principal de facto leaders. On September 26, 1969, when the club returned from another successful tour, unbeaten in a series of seven matches in Europe, the group gathered in an old house in the traditional neighborhood of Brás in São Paulo. It was decided to name the group Torcida Jovem since the founders were no older than 21 years of age. Cosmo's house became the first official seat of the first organized supporters group for Santos FC. The firm's first witness of the club's success came on November 19 of that same year in Rio de Janeiro. In a match against Vasco da Gama, Pelé, named the "Athlete of the Century" by the International Olympic Committee, and widely regarded among football historians, former players and fans to be one of the best and most accomplished footballers in the game's history. scored his 1,000th goal in the Maracanã. The following year, the Torcida Jovem made themselves present during Brazil's victorious campaign during the 1970 FIFA World Cup.

== Classifications ==
Year	Place	Division	Plot	Carnivals Producers	Singers	Ref
1979	5th place	Special Blocks	Folia do Mundo Santista	Carnival Commission	Commission	
1980	4th place	Special Blocks	Vamos Nessa Barca autor: Marco Antonio	Carnival Commission	Marco Antonio	
1981	3rd place	Special Blocks	O Trem da Felicidade Autor: Marco Antonio	Carnival Commission	Marco Antonio	
1982	Vice Champion	Special Blocks	Paraíso Infantil Autores: Mozart Saboia de Araújo/David Martins	Mozart Saboia de Araújo	David Martins	
1983	Vice Champion	Special Blocks	Carnaval das Arábias Autores: Mozart Saboia de Araújo/David Martins	Mozart Saboia de Araújo	David Martins	
1984	Vice Champion	Special Blocks	Pintando o 7 Autores: Xixa/Daniel e Gilbertinho	Xixa, Daniel	Gilbertinho	
1985	Vice Champion	Special Blocks	Olhando para o Céu Autor: Marco Antonio	Carnival Commission	Marco Antonio	
1986	Vice Champion	Special Blocks	Bum Bum, se Tiver Marmelada Tem Zum Zum Autor: Marco Antonio	Carnival Commission	Marco Antonio	
1987	3rd place	Special Blocks	Vou Bater Tamanco Autor: Marco Antonio	Carnival Commission	Marco Antonio	
1988	Champion	Special Blocks	Hoje Eu Vim Para Confundir e Não Para Explicar Autor: Marco Antonio	Carnival Commission	Marco Antonio	
1989	Vice Champion	Special Blocks	Malandros e Malandragens Autor: Marco Antonio	Carnival Commission	Marco Antonio	
1990	Champion	Special Blocks	A Magia desta Folia	Carnival Commission	Commission	
1991	Champion	Special Blocks	Deixem Meu Povo Brincar o Carnaval	Carnival Commission	Commission	
1992	3rd place	Special Blocks	Rolou Brasil	Carnival Commission	Commission	
1993	7th place	Special Blocks	Quem Me Viu... Quem Me Vê... Autor: Marco Antonio	Carnival Commission	Marco Antonio	
1994	3rd place	Special Blocks	Folia do Gordo	Carnival Commission	Commission	
1995	Vice Champion	Special Blocks	Do Sorriso da Lagosta, ao Abraço do Siri	Carnival Commission	Commission	
1996	Champion	Special Blocks	Tem Folia, Tem Zueira, Porque Hoje é Sexta-feira	Carnival Commission	Commission	
1997	Champion	Special Blocks	Alquimia, A Magia da Transformação	Carnival Commission	Commission	
1998	Vice Champion	Special Blocks	Nesta Terra de Reis...Onde foi Que Eu Errei?	Carnival Commission	Commission	
1999	5th place	Special Blocks	No Voo das Águias Guerreiras, 20 Anos de Luta	Carnival Commission	Commission	
2000	7th place	Special Blocks	Encantos e Poesias No Feitiço das Sereias	Carnival Commission	Commission	
2001	3rd place	Special Blocks	O Brasil em Dia de Festa	Carnival Commission	Commission	
2002	10th place	Special Blocks	Uma Noite na Terra da Garoa	Carnival Commission	Commission	
2003	4th place	Group 3-UESP	Façam suas Apostas! A Sorte está Lançada... Na Festa de Momo o Vencedor Será Sempre o Folião!	Carnival Commission	Marcelo Santos	
2004	Champion	Group 3-UESP	Torcida Jovem é Aricanduva, Terra de um Povo Guerreiro, Sonhador e Sambista	Carnival Commission	Anderson Paulino	
2005	4th place	Group 2-UESP	Será a Voz Negra ou Será Negra a Voz da Liberdade?	Carnival Commission	Anderson Paulino	
2006	3rd place	Group 2-UESP	No Sonho de Momo, Torcida Jovem teve a sua vez	Paulão	Lacunha	
2007	5th place	Group 2-UESP	De lá pra cá	Paulão	Lacunha	
2008	3rd place	Group 2-UESP	Tribos Urbanas - Novos Quilombos	Carnival Commission	Commission	
2009	5th place	Group 1-UESP	Aceito Tudo! O Que Vier, Eu Traço!	Carnival Commission	Pedro Pinotti	
2010	Vice Champion	Group 1-UESP	Divina Sedução	Carnival Commission	Pedro Pinotti	
2011	8th place	Access	Quem foi rei nunca perde a majestade	Carnival Commission	Pedro Pinotti	
2012	3rd place	Group 1-UESP	Camisa 100 - Sua bandeira no mastro é a história de um passado e um presente só de glórias	Carnival Commission	Pedro Pinotti	
2013	3rd place	Group 1-UESP	Sinfonia das cores em aquarela	Carnival Commission	Pedro Pinotti	
2014	Vice Champion	Group 1-UESP	Confete - Pedacinho Colorido de felicidade Compositores:Edivaldo Gonçalves, Luizinho, Jô Pires e Luiz Pereira. Intérprete:Tato Santa Cruz.	Carnival Commission	Pedro Pinotti	
2015	5th place	Group 1-UESP	Segura o laço que esse boi é meu! Compositores: Danilo Britto, Júnior ABC, Marcinho Keleque, Wagner Alexandre, Rodney Cheto, Pedro Antunes, Pierluiggi e Cris Napoli. Intérprete:Celsinho Mody	Carnival Commission	Pedro Pinotti	
2016	Vice Champion	Group 1-UESP	A Torcida Jovem deita e rola, é samba...É show de bola!	Carnival Commission	Hernane Siqueira	
2017	10th place	Group 1-UESP	Sou Milenar!! Sou o Pecado...	Carnival Commission	Fernando Dias	
2018	11th place	Access 2	O Corsário Elegante: O Terror dos Sete Mares	Carnival Commission	Pedro Pinotti	
2019	9th place	Access 2	No batuque do tambor, nosso samba e raiz e tradição Compositores: Celsinho Mody, Fabiano Tennor, Luizinho Ramos, Marrom e Mike	Carnival Commission	Pedro Pinotti	
2020	4th place	Access 2	Prepare seu coração, para as coisas que vou contar	Sérgio Yamaoka, Jéfferson, Fábio, André and Fabiano	Leonardo	
2021		Access 2	Bela Vista. Berço cultural desse país!	Fernando Pretti (Raposa), Bambu, China, Deko, Evandro and Jé	Fabiano Tenor	

== See also ==
- Roman Catholic Archdiocese of São Paulo
- Vai-Vai
- Carrão (São Paulo Metro)
- Penha (São Paulo Metro)
- Line 3 (São Paulo Metro)
- Brazilian Carnival
- Carnival of São Paulo
- Sambadrome
- Anhembi Sambadrome
- Float (parade)
- Bateria
- Mano Brown
- Nasser Al-Khelaifi
- Diadema, São Paulo
- Independent League of the Samba Schools of São Paulo
