= La Doce =

Argentine football barra brava

Jugador Número Doce
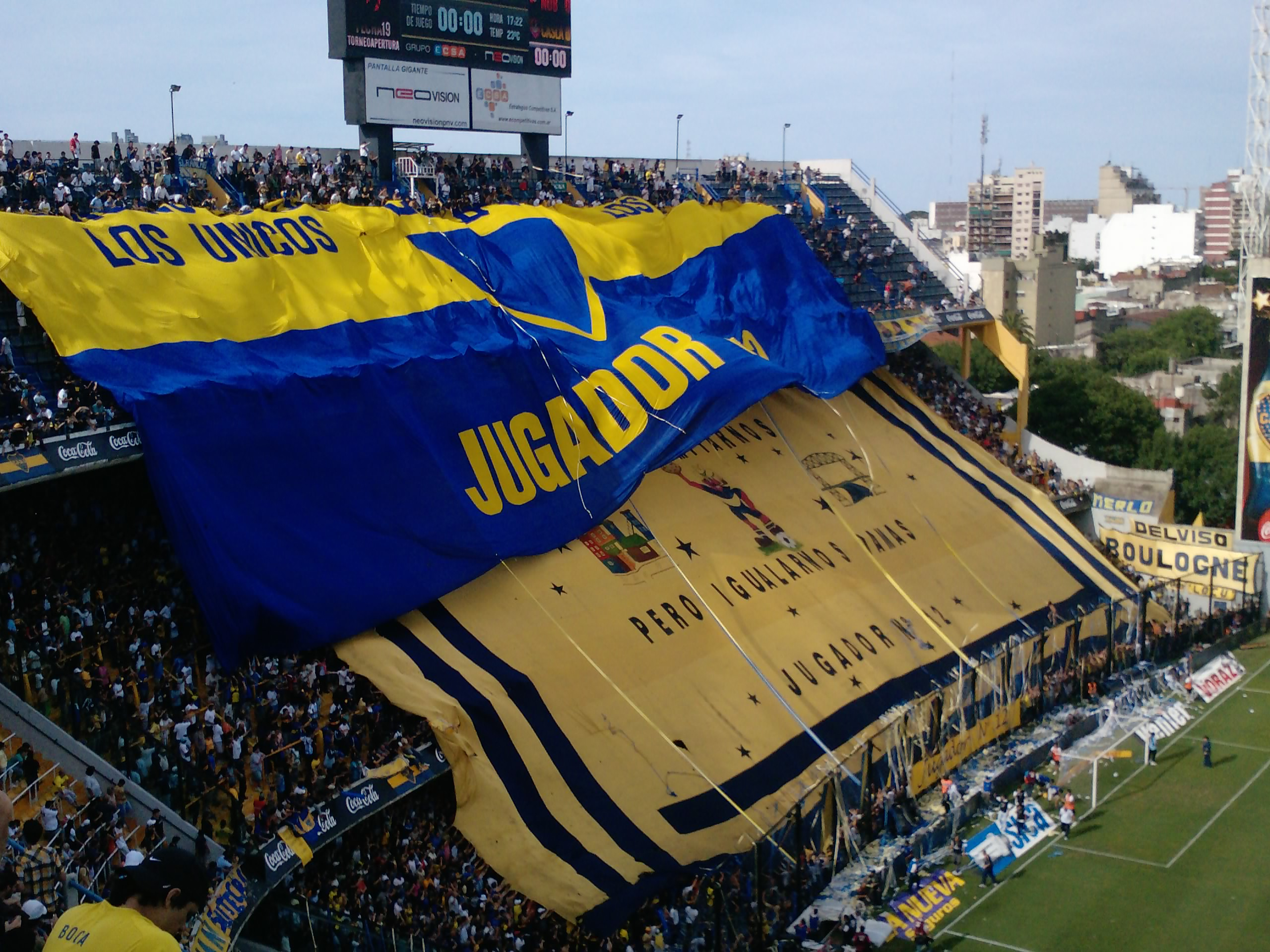
- Abbreviation: La 12
- Founded: 1965
- Type: Supporters' group
- Location: La Boca, Buenos Aires, Argentina
- Arena: La Bombonera
- Stand: North (at home)
- Colors

La Doce is a barra brava (supporters group) of the Argentine football side Boca Juniors ('Boca'). The group's name is a reference to "the 12th player" (la doce).

== History ==
La Doce has attracted media attention due to violence involving its members.
