= BKU =

BKU or bku can refer to:

- BankUnited, an American bank holding company, by stock ticker
- Buhid language, a language spoken on Mindoro island, the Philippines, by ISO 639 code
- Bashundhara Kings Ultras (BKU), First registered fan club in Bangladesh, which was established on 29 April 2021, and supports the Bangladeshi club, Bashundhara Kings.
- Bharatiya Kisan Union, an Indian farmers' union
- Betioky Airport, an airport in Betioky, Madagascar, by IATA code; see List of airports in Madagascar
