= 12th man (football) =

Term used for football fans

The 12th man or 12th player is a collective term for fans of sports teams in many eleven-a-side games, in particular association football. As most football leagues allow a maximum of eleven players per team on the playing field at a time, referring to a team's fans as the 12th man implies that they have a potentially helpful and significant role in the game.

The presence of fans can have a notable impact on teams' performance, an element in the home advantage. Namely, the home team fans would vocally support and urge on their team to win the game. Thus, these fans will often create loud sounds or chant in the hope of encouraging their team, or of distracting, demoralizing, or confusing the opposing team while they have possession of the ball, or to persuade a referee to make a favorable decision for the team. Noises are made by shouting, singing, whistling, stomping, clapping, and various other techniques.

In Canadian football, 12 players from each team are usually on the field at one time and the term 13th man is often used to refer to fans. Similarly, in Australian rules football, 18 players are on the field, and the fans are often referred to as the 19th man. However, in basketball, where five players are on the court, the term Sixth man generally refers to an energetic substitute player. Similarly, in rugby sevens, with seven players from each team on the field, "Eighth man" is not used to refer to fans as the term refers to the eighth forward in rugby union. The term Twelfth Man has a specifically different meaning in cricket, referring instead to the nominated first substitute player who fields when a member of the fielding side is injured during play.

== History ==
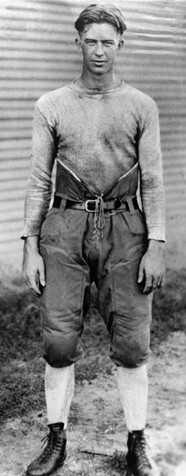
Texas A&M's E. King Gill during the 1921–1922 season

The first recorded use of the term "twelfth man" was a magazine published by the University of Minnesota in September 1900, that referred to "the mysterious influence of the twelfth man on the team, the rooter". Later, in the November 1912 edition of The Iowa Alumnus, an alumni publication of the University of Iowa (then known as State University of Iowa), E. A. McGowan described the 1903 game between Iowa and the University of Illinois. In his article, "The Twelfth Player", McGowan wrote: "The eleven men had done their best; but the twelfth man on the team (the loyal spirited Iowa rooter) had won the game for old S.U.I."

The 1922 Dixie Classic served as the setting for an event later referred to as "The story of the 12th Man". This football game featured the top-ranked Centre College and The Agricultural and Mechanical College of Texas (later known as Texas A&M). During the game, A&M coach Dana X. Bible realized that one more injury would leave him without another backfield player to send into the game. Bible called E. King Gill, a sophomore basketball player, down from the stands to stand ready as a substitute. Gill was ready in uniform on the sidelines if his team needed him.

Individuals have occasionally been labeled by local media as the "Twelfth Man" of their team. In 1930, W. H. Adamson, Principal of Oak Cliff (Dallas) High School was called the "Twelfth Man" of the school's American football team by a local reporter due to the rousing pre-game speeches he would give to the players. Likewise, sometimes, fans of both teams in an annual contest have been described as the 12th man.

In the 1935 Princeton–Dartmouth game before 56,000 fans who braved the snow and cold, spectator Mike Mesco was initially reported to have left his seat from the stands to join the Dartmouth defensive line and was referred to in a local newspaper as the "Twelfth Dartmouth Man", though later was found to be not Mesco, but George Larsen of Cranford, New Jersey.

== Use in American football ==
The term has been used by various American football teams including the University of Minnesota, the University of Iowa, Baylor University, Dartmouth College, Simmons College, Texas A&M and the NFL's Seattle Seahawks, Green Bay Packers, Buffalo Bills, Denver Broncos, Washington Commanders, Indianapolis Colts, Miami Dolphins, and Chicago Bears in marketing practices in reference to their supporters. The Bears currently use the phrase "4th Phase" (with the first three phases being offense, defense, and special teams), and the Seahawks currently use the phrase "The 12s".

=== 12th Man Clubs ===
Many high schools in the United States incorporate 12th man language into their booster, supporter, or rooter clubs. Examples of such "12th Man Clubs" include the Dana Hills Dolphins, Washington Panthers, Richwood Knights, Diamond Bar Brahmas, Fairfield Falcons, and Brentwood Bruins.

The Campbellsville University Tigers of the National Association of Intercollegiate Athletics also have a 12th Man Club.

=== Buffalo Bills ===
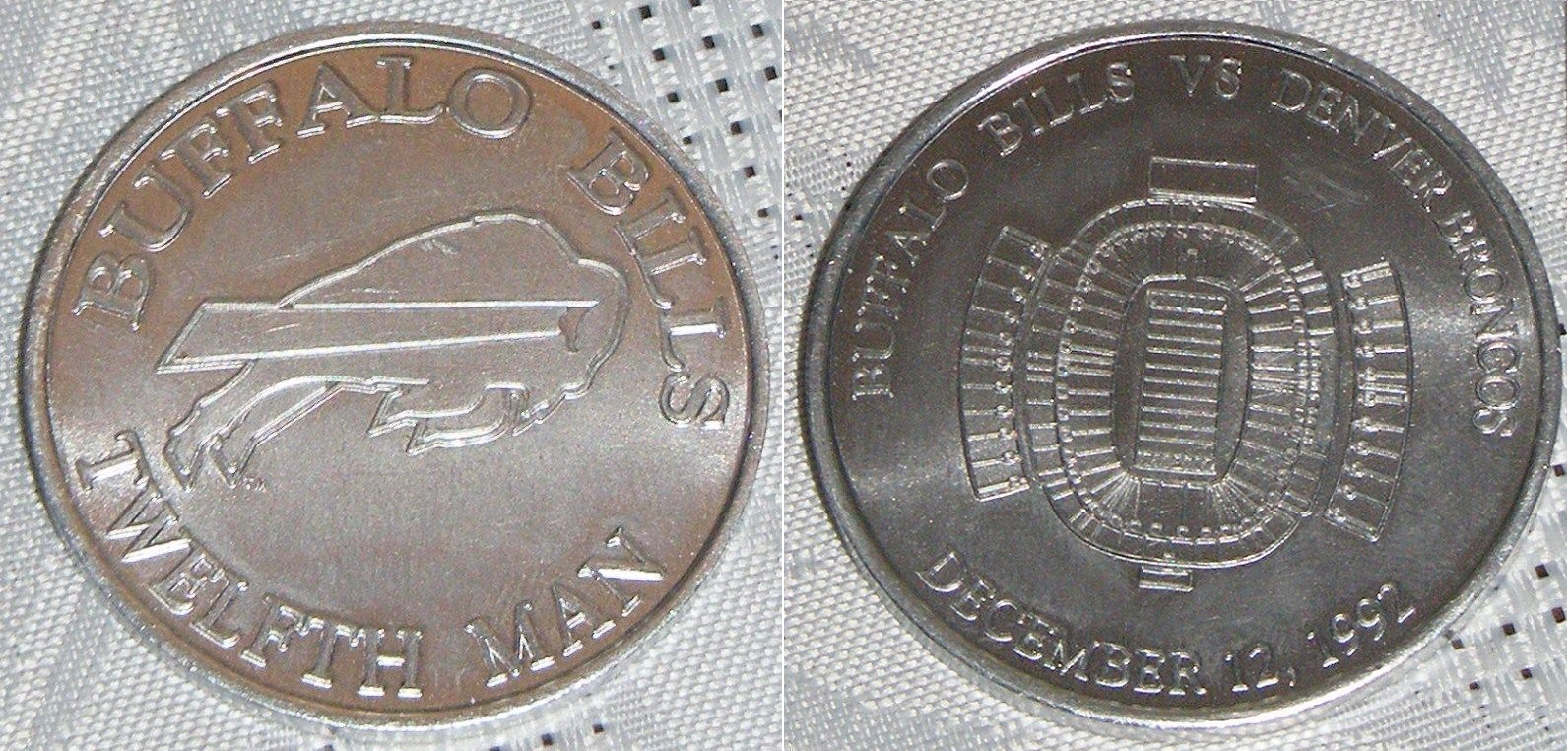
Buffalo Bills 12th Man coin, from the December 12, 1992, Wall of Fame induction

On December 12, 1992, (12/12/1992) the Buffalo Bills of the National Football League honored their 12th Man as the seventh inductee into the Buffalo Bills Wall of Fame, located inside Rich Stadium. Their fans were inducted because of their loyal support during the team's early '90s Super Bowl runs, which coincided with quarterback Jim Kelly and his wearing of #12. In 2008, the Bills renamed their "12th Man Walk of Fame" as "Tim Russert Plaza", in honor of the recently deceased Buffalo native and lifelong fan. The team continued to refer to its fans as the "12th Man", with their independent, international fan clubs known as "Bills Backers Chapters". The Bills maintained a licensing agreement with Texas A&M over the use of the "12th Man" term. Upon moving to Highmark Stadium in 2026, the team renamed its "12th man" entry as Bills Mafia, in homage to the name for the Bills community that had emerged in the 2010s and which the Bills trademarked in 2020, with the date of induction retained as 1992.

=== Indianapolis Colts ===
From 2007 to 2016, fans of the Indianapolis Colts of the NFL were known as the 12th Man. The Colts created a Ring of Honor on September 23, 1996, after playing 13 seasons in Indianapolis, Indiana. In 2007, the Colts inducted their 12th Man as the sixth entrant into the team's Ring of Honor, then located on the interior facade of the RCA Dome. The Ring of Honor currently encircles Lucas Oil Stadium, the team's home venue. The organization also designates a "12th Man Fan of the Game". On November 12, 2015, Texas A&M announced the filing of a lawsuit against the Colts based on the team's usage of the term. On February 17, 2016, the lawsuit was settled with the Colts agreeing to remove the phrase from their Ring of Honor and to immediately cease all other uses of the trademarked phrase.

=== Seattle Seahawks ===
The 12th Man flag of the Seattle Seahawks

The Seattle Seahawks retired the number 12 jersey on December 15, 1984, in honor of their fans. In 2003, the Seahawks installed a giant flagpole in the south end zone of what is now Lumen Field, and began a tradition of raising a giant flag with the number 12 on it in honor of the fans, one of whom is Sam Adkins, the former Seahawks quarterback who did wear the number 12. Usually, a local celebrity or a season ticket holder raises the flag during pregame ceremonies. In recent years, 12th Man flags have been seen all over Seattle whenever the Seahawks make the playoffs, including atop the Space Needle. In 2014, Boeing painted a Boeing 747-8 freighter aircraft with a special Seahawks livery, with the number 12 on the tail, and they later flew it over eastern Washington in a flight path spelling the number 12. When the Seahawks took the field for Super Bowl XLVIII, they were led by LB Heath Farwell carrying the team's 12th Man flag per team tradition. In May 2016, mountaineer David Liaño González displayed a 12th Man flag at the summit of Mount Everest.

The Seahawks' 12th Man has twice set the Guinness World Record loudest crowd noise at a sporting event, first on September 15, 2013, registering 136.6 dB during a game against the San Francisco 49ers and again on December 2, 2013, during a Monday Night Football game against the New Orleans Saints, with a roar of 137.6 dB. As per an agreement struck between the Seahawks and Texas A&M in 2016, the Seahawks have virtually ceased from referring to their fans as the "12th Man", and instead are using the term "12s" or the 12 Fan.

=== Texas A&M ===
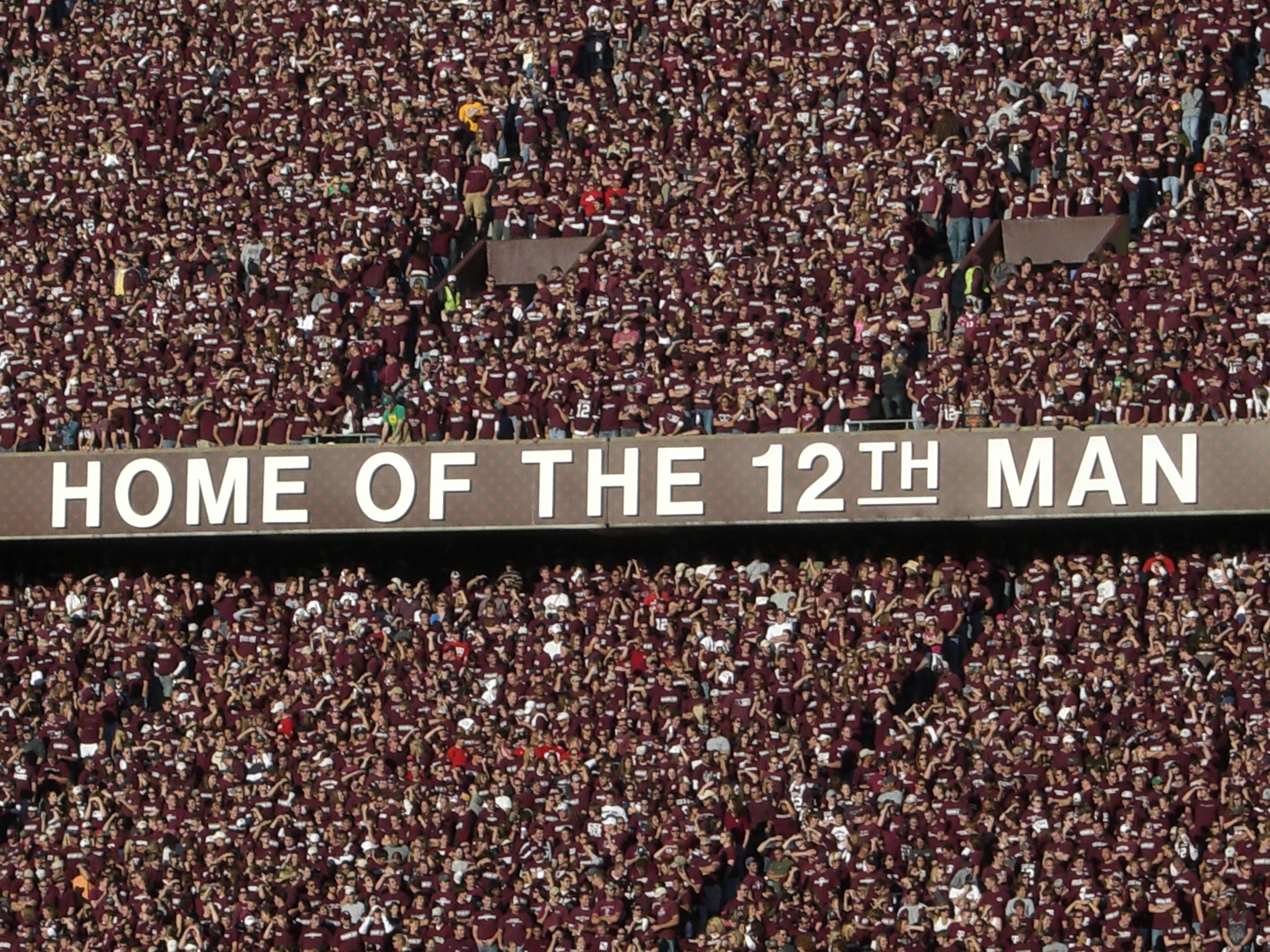
The Texas A&M student section of Kyle Field stands the entire game to show support for the football team.

The first known instance of Texas A&M referring to its fanbase as the "12th Man" is contained on page 17 of the November 25, 1921, edition of The Battalion, the Texas A&M campus newspaper. Ever since the day E. King Gill left the stands in 1922; the entire student body stood throughout the game to symbolize their "readiness, desire, and enthusiasm" to take the field if needed. A statue of E. King Gill stands on the campus.

Football coach Jackie Sherrill created the "12th Man Kick-Off Team" in the 1980s, composed of non-athletic scholarship students who tried out for the team. Coach Sherrill has written a book entitled "No Experience Required" which details this team and the tradition. These students were placed on the roster for the sole purpose of kickoffs. The squad was nicknamed "the suicide squad". These students often had little regard for their safety and were determined to make a tackle at any cost. The 12th Man Kick-Off Team was extremely successful and eventually held opponents to one of the lowest yards-per-return average in the league during kickoffs. Later, head coach R. C. Slocum changed the team to allow only one representative of the 12th Man on the kickoff team who wears uniform number 12. The player is chosen based on the level of determination and hard work shown in practices. Under Dennis Franchione, the 12th Man Kick-Off Team, composed of walk-ons, was brought back, though used only rarely when the team was up by quite a few points.

On June 30, 2014, Texas A&M bought the domain name 12thman.com, which then became its official athletics website.

=== Washington Redskins ===
In 1986, the Washington Redskins (now known as the Washington Commanders) released a video entitled "Thanks to the 12th Man".

== Use in association football (soccer) ==
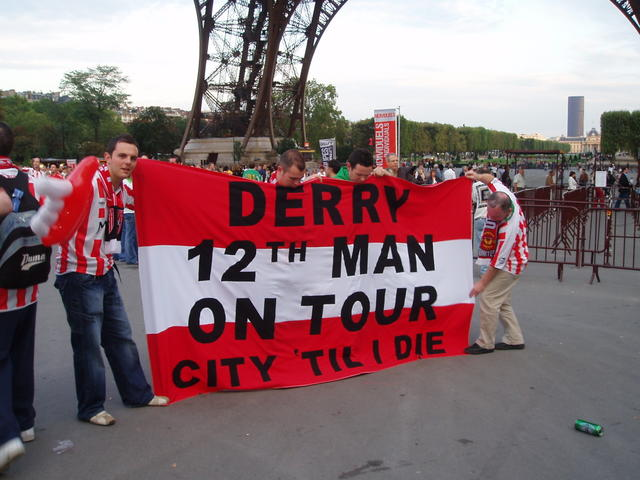
Derry City's twelfth man in Paris, France

The term "12th man" is commonly used in football to refer to the fans and occasionally the manager. A notable club famous for the twelfth man reference comes from Aston Villa, referring to the Holte End stand at Villa Park. Large European teams such as Bayern Munich, Malmö FF, Hammarby IF, Helsingborgs IF, Werder Bremen, Aberdeen, Rangers, Lazio, PSV, Feyenoord, Ferencvárosi TC, FC Red Star, Fenerbahçe S.K., and Sporting CP have officially retired the number 12 to the fans. Stockport County fans are registered as official members of their squad with the number 12. Portsmouth F.C. has also retired its number 12 shirt, and lists the club's supporters, "Pompey Fans", as player number 12 on the squad list printed in home match programmes, while Plymouth Argyle have theirs registered to the Green Army (the nickname for their fans). Number 12 is also reserved for the fans at many other clubs, including CSKA Moscow and Zenit Saint Petersburg in Russia, Bristol Rovers and Grimsby Town in England, as well as Aarhus Gymnastikforening (AGF), Odense Boldklub, also known as OB, in Denmark, Malmö FF and Hammarby IF in Sweden, Persija Jakarta in Indonesia, Botev Plovdiv in Bulgaria and Perth Glory in Australia. On Hammarby IF's, Helsingborgs IF, Malmö FF, Feyenoord and Werder Bremen's home games, the stadium speaker announces number 12 as "the fans" during team lineup announcements.

Dynamo Dresden in Germany also keeps number 12 for their fans, as well as the official team anthem being "We are the 12th man". Aberdeen F.C. supporters commonly display a large banner in the shape of a football shirt with the text "Red Army 12" in place of a player's name and number. The fans of the Northern Ireland national football team and Derry City are referred to as the 12th man as well. In the League of Ireland, Shamrock Rovers F.C. retired the number 12 jersey in recognition of the fans who took over the club in 2005. Cork City F.C., Clube Atlético Mineiro and Clube de Regatas do Flamengo also retired the number 12 for the fans. The most vociferous fans of Boca Juniors in Argentina are known as the "Jugador Numero 12" (Spanish for "Player Number 12") or simply "La Doce" ("The 12"). On September 18, 2004, U.S. Lecce, an Italian team currently playing in Serie B, retired the number 12 to the fans, which was handed to them by the former captain Cristian Ledesma. They symbolically represent a 12th Man in the field. In the beginning of 2009–2010 season, Happy Valley AA introduced the club's mascot, a panda, on squad list as the fan club captain wearing the number 12 jersey. As of the end of the 2011–2012 season, Rangers F.C announced that the number 12 jersey would be retired in honour of the fans support throughout a period of financial difficulty.

== Other usage ==
In American football, the sideline is sometimes also referred to as the "12th man" or "12th defender": since a player is considered down when he steps out of bounds, the sideline effectively acts as an extra defender. This usage is less common than the one referring to the fans. In most sports the term can also be construed to mean the referee, implying that the match official favours one team and is not impartial.

== Effects ==
The effects of the "12th man" vary widely, but can be put in two categories. The first is simply psychological, the effect of showing the home team that they are appreciated, and showing the away team that they are somewhat unwelcome. The second directly relates to the deafening effects of a loud crowd.

In Association football, the crowd can be very passionate and often sing throughout the whole match. Some occasions where the crowd noise is extra loud can be before kickoff; during the buildup to and scoring of a goal; when encouraging the team to come back from defeat; to discourage an opposition penalty taker; or to harass a referee giving a free kick to the opposition team.

In American football, fans are most incited by physical play, especially good plays made by the defense. Additionally, the home team can derive energy from the loud noise of their fans; former American football players have described the feeling of their adrenaline pumping after hearing the fans yell, which is "like you have a reserve energy tank".

The noise of the crowd can have a significant impact on the players on the field. In American football, an extremely loud crowd can prevent the offensive linemen from hearing the snap count. This can have the effect of making the player slower to react when the ball is snapped, and his eventual response may be weaker than normal because each play is begun "with some indecision and doubt". The noise can also prevent players from hearing audibles and can make it difficult for the team's offense to coordinate plays in the huddle. The effect of the noise can often be measured in mistakes, such as false start penalties.

Coaches can take steps to minimize the effect of the crowd noise on their teams. Some American football teams bring large speakers to their practice fields and broadcast loud noises such as jet engines to prepare their teams for the anticipated noise level. Crowd noise tends to diminish after a long lull in play, such as a pause for instant replay. Former NFL player Brian Baldinger speculates that some coaches draw out reviews as part of a coaching strategy to quiet the crowd for their next play.

A researcher from Harvard University discovered in a study that some association football referees appeared to be impacted by crowd noise. His studies revealed that a home team acquired an additional 0.1 goal advantage for every 10,000 fans in the stadium.

Delia Smith, Norwich City's joint major shareholder, received some attention when she took to the pitch during a half time interval, with a microphone in hand and Sky TV cameras in tow, to tell fans the side "need their twelfth man". "Where are you?" she cried. Norwich City lost the game in the final seconds, but Smith's passion worked to increase the affection the fans held for her.

The current naturally loudest football stadium is Nef Stadium in Istanbul home of Galatasaray S.K. As a prepared attempt, the current world record for crowd noise at an athletic event was set on September 29, 2014, when the Kansas City Chiefs hosted the New England Patriots. Noise during that event reached a high of 142.2 decibels during a timeout.

== Texas A&M trademark ==
Texas A&M University applied on December 26, 1989, for trademark U.S. Ser. No. 74013898 related to usage of the term. The United States Patent and Trademark Office issued the "trademark registration" September 4, 1990, to Texas A&M. Four additional Trademark claims related to the "12th Man" term were also filed and granted at later dates by Texas A&M University (See U.S. Ser. Nos. 74560726, 76671314, 85977835 and 85851199), the first three of which have achieved Incontestable Status as a result of its section 15 affidavit with the Patent and Trademark Office. According to former Texas A&M Athletic Director Bill Byrne, he contacted the Chicago Bears and Buffalo Bills about halting their "12th Man" themes. Byrne stated that, "they responded quickly with our requests to stop using our Twelfth Man trademark". Texas A&M sent requests to stop using the phrase to the Seattle Seahawks in both 2004 and 2005. The Seahawks did not respond to the requests.

In January 2006, Texas A&M filed a trademark infringement lawsuit against the Seattle Seahawks and in May 2006, the dispute was settled out of court. Neither side admitted any fault or liability. In the agreement, the Seahawks licensed the phrase in exchange for $100,000, along with public acknowledgement as to Texas A&M's ownership rights of the phrase, and an additional annual fee. The compensation amounted to $5,000 per year. The agreement, which expired in 2016, limited the Seahawks' usage to seven western states and forbid them from selling any "12th Man" merchandise. In August 2015, the Seahawks shifted towards calling their fans the "12s", and replaced their "Home of the 12th Man" stadium sign with a new "Home of the 12s" sign.

On November 12, 2015, Texas A&M filed suit against the Indianapolis Colts after repeated cease and desist requests were ignored by the NFL team. On February 17, 2016, the lawsuit was settled with the Colts agreeing to remove the phrase from their Ring of Honor and to immediately cease all other uses of the trademarked phrase.

In August 2016, the Seahawks agreed to a new five-year trademark licensing agreement with Texas A&M. As part of the agreement, the Seahawks agreed to pay Texas A&M $140,000 for limited rights to use the trademarked term. This agreement, like the previous agreement, prohibits the Seahawks from using the "12th Man" term on any merchandise. The new agreement, however, also prohibits Seattle from using the term on social media, nor are they allowed to use the term on any signage within their stadium, including their Ring of Honor.

== See also ==
- Sixth man
- Sixth man (fans)
