= Torcida organizada =

Organized supporters' groups of football teams in Brazil

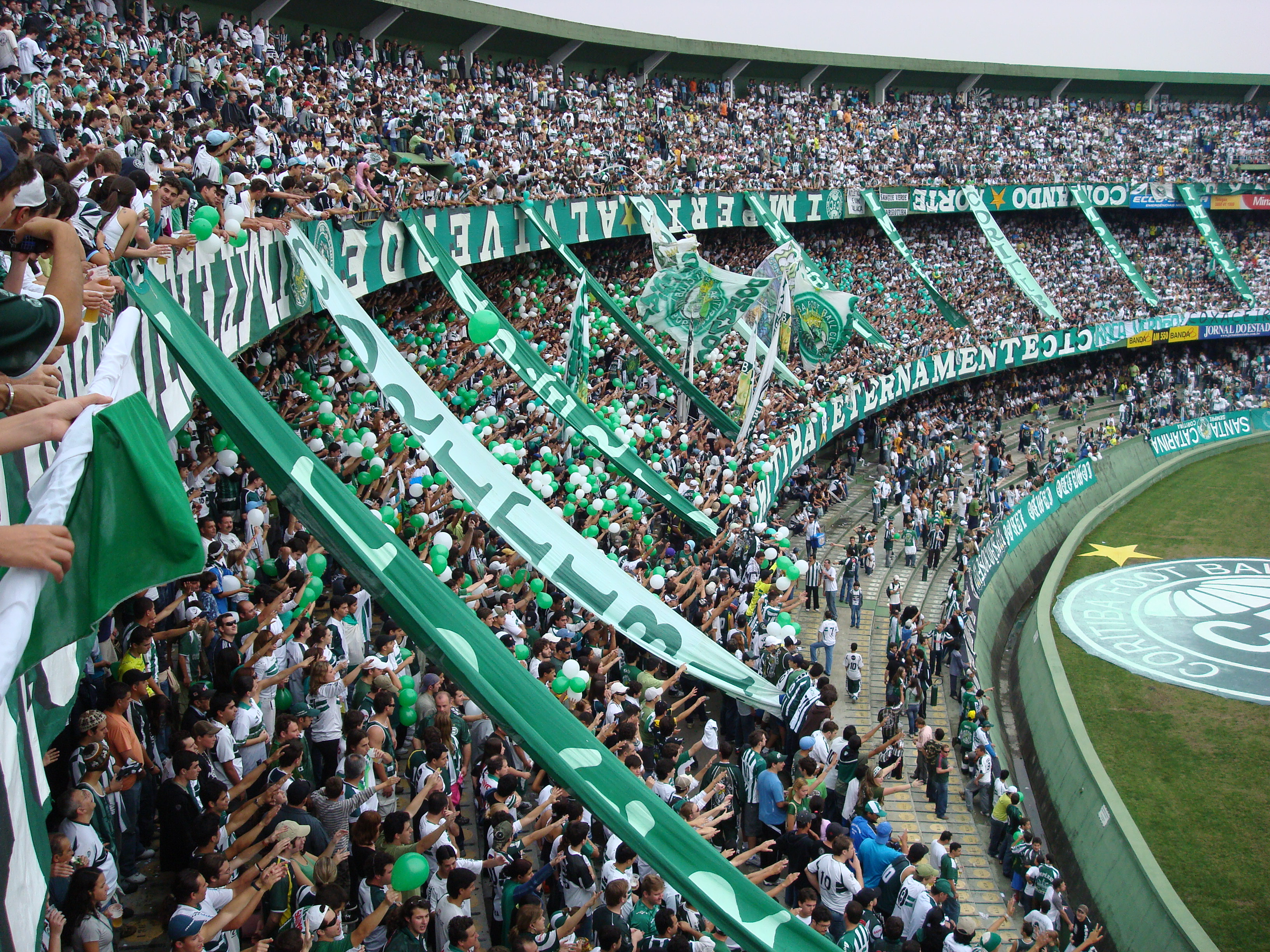
Império Alviverde, fans of Coritiba in Curitiba

Torcidas organizadas (Portuguese pronunciation: [toʁˈsidɐz oʁɡɐ̃niˈzadɐs], organized fans or organized supporters) are formal (or informal) associations of football fans in Brazil in the same vein as barras bravas in the rest of Latin America, hooligan firms in United Kingdom and ultras in the rest of Europe, North America, Asia, Australia and North Africa.

The torcidas are characterized by forming associations looking for the best way to support the team with flags, football chants, mosaics and performances inside and outside the stadium. The rationale for the fans' behavior is that it can help the team gather strength to beat the opponent. Although their main and explicit objective is to support their clubs, torcidas are also linked with several incidents of hooliganism and football violence.

The name is based on the Portuguese verb torcer, which means "to wring" or "to twist"; the definition shifted to "to root for" after wringing scarfs became an emotional outlet for female Brazilian spectators attending football matches in the 1930s.

Due to hooliganism and violence associated with the Torcidas organizadas, the Brazilian government created the Estatuto do Torcedor, a law which regulates the Torcidas organizadas, giving them rights and duties.

== Beginnings in Brazil ==
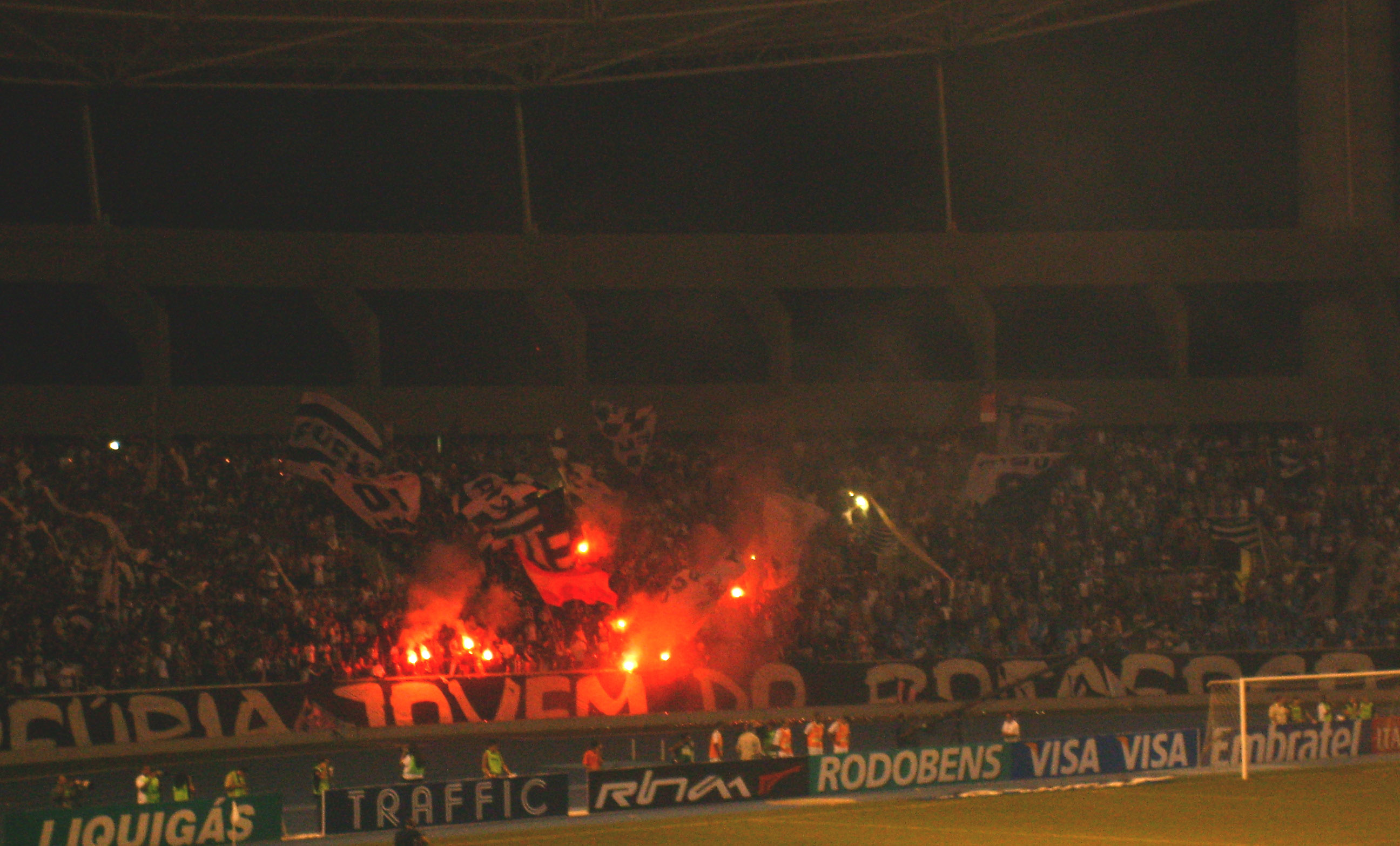
Fúria Jovem do Botafogo with flares in a match against Corinthians

In the beginning of the 1940s, and until the 1960s, torcidas organizadas were informal associations of fans who gathered to buy fireworks, cloth for large flags, and other stuff to be used during celebrations. The first one was the "Charanga Rubro-Negra" (Flamengo), created in 1942. Later, such associations became permanent, and were legally formalized as nonprofit recreational associations with the primary goal of providing a better spectacle at the stadium and surroundings. Some of the noteworthy torcidas organizadas from this time were: Torcida Jovem Fla and Raça Rubro-Negra (Flamengo), Gaviões da Fiel (Corinthians), Torcida Independente and Dragões da Real (São Paulo FC), Mancha Verde (Palmeiras), Força Jovem Vasco (Vasco da Gama), Máfia Azul (Cruzeiro), Galoucura (Atlético Mineiro), Torcida Jovem do Santos (Santos FC), Young Flu (Fluminense), Fúria Jovem do Botafogo (Botafogo), Bamor (Esporte Clube Bahia), Torcida Jovem do Sport (Sport Club do Recife), Os Imbatíveis (Esporte Clube Vitória), Inferno Coral (Santa Cruz Futebol Clube), Os Fanáticos (Clube Atlético Paranaense), Império Alviverde (Coritiba Foot Ball Club), Garra Alvinegra (ABC Futebol Clube), Máfia Vermelha (América de Natal). In the beginning the torcida organizada movement was fragmentary, but would later consolidate into larger bodies or leagues. Some torcidas would open branches throughout the country to support their teams playing away, given the national range of their supporters.

== Violence ==
"Torcidas organizadas" later became infamous for their association with stadium violence, which would cause Justice to disband some of them (notably Gaviões da Fiel, Mancha Verde and Torcida Independente, both the top and most hard-core firms and active in one of the largest cities in the world: São Paulo). Some clubs would also be plagued by rival torcidas which would battle each other as well as the opponents.

A notable incident of violence was the "Battle of Pacaembu" in 1995. When the U-20 "Supercopa Junior" tournament finals between Palmeiras and São Paulo FC at the Pacaembu Stadium ended with a golden goal, Palmeiras supporters invaded the pitch to celebrate. São Paulo supporters invaded an area under renovation, stealing bricks, rocks, sticks and other building materials to invade the pitch as well and attack their rival supporters. As this was a junior tournament, police and paramedical services were too meagre to manage the riot. 108 people were wounded and one person died, resulting in tighter controls being imposed on the Torcidas Organizadas.

Rivalry is embedded in Brazilian football culture, but when it comes to their organized (or uniformed) supporters, things can take a turn for the worse. Some groups can relate only with their equals, a common occurrence for "torcidas organizadas", "barras bravas" and "firms" all over the world.

Torcidas Organizadas have also strong ties with local organized crime. In 2017, Moacir Bianchi, one of the founders of Palmeiras' torcida organizada Mancha Verde, was murdered by a member of the Primeiro Comando da Capital (PCC) as he attempted to mediate and prevent a hostile takeover by a PCC-backed faction.

== Friendships ==
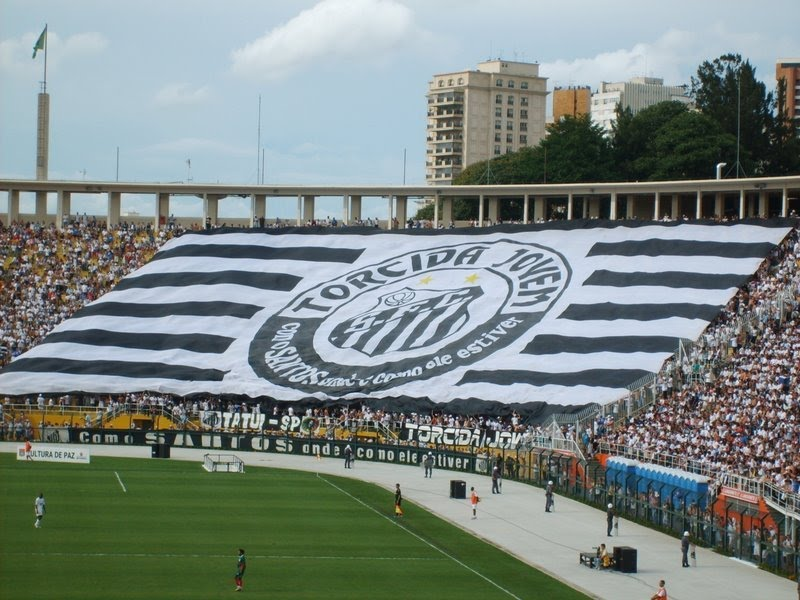
Torcida Jovem of Santos

Teams active over a wider range on national and international field have come to experience historical clashes that created fierce rivals, as well as close and loyal allies. An example for this is the union between three of the main organized firms then and today: Mancha Verde (Palmeiras), Força Jovem Vasco (Vasco) and Galoucura (Atlético Mineiro) who have a friendship that dates back to the early 1980s, while rivals Torcida Jovem Fla (supporters of Flamengo), Torcida Independente (supporters of São Paulo FC) and Máfia Azul (Cruzeiro) are also linked to each other.

These old unions, dated by some sources to the beginning of the 1980s and 1990s (in the Jovem Fla-Independente case), have been a theme for songs and ovations whenever these two teams meet or whenever they meet each other's rivals. The groups sing that each one of them is unified with another group of supporters. With this, two opposite mobs of national unified groups were created. Within these unions it is normal that the supporters exchange shirts, caps, and other articles; therefore it is common to see gear of allied teams (Palmeiras), Atlético Mineiro, Grêmio Bahia and ABC Futebol Clube at Vasco da Gama games.

Torcida Independente, Torcida Jovem Fla and Máfia Azul's alliance was known for their own "symbol". To symbolize their own group and alliance, they raised their fists and crossed them, calling themselves "punhos cruzados" (crossed fists). In reference and prejudice to this, Mancha Verde, Galoucura and Força Jovem do Vasco put heir middle fingers up and called themselves "dedos pro alto" (raised fingers); the alliance between Young Flu (Fluminense) Fúria Independente Guarani and Fúria Independente Paraná also have their touching fists symbol. Players for both teams, especially from Flamengo and São Paulo, are known to represent these 'expressions' after scoring a goal on the pitch, driving the hard-core fans crazy with pride. Depending on the club the Torcidas Organizadas can have a certain level of influence in the confines and politically within the clubs; notably Gaviões da Fiel have a considerable amount of power in Corinthians as do their rivals Mancha Verde in Palmeiras; who were single-handedly responsible for the demise of players like Vagner Love and Diego Souza to move on to other clubs. Yet Torcida Independente have little to no influence over São Paulo FC.

== European Torcidas ==
The Brazilian influence stretched into Europe through Torcida Split, a formal association of Hajduk Split fans in the Croatian Dalmatia region. Torcida Split is now the oldest (1950) organized supporters' group in Europe. Thanks to Torcida Split, many other Torcida organized supporters' groups were created, among them rapidly growing and acting Górnik Zabrze fans, called Torcida Górnik, KF Trepça fans called Torcida Mitrovicë, and FK Novi Pazar fans, called Torcida Sandžak.

== Differences between Torcidas and the Barras Bravas and Ultras ==
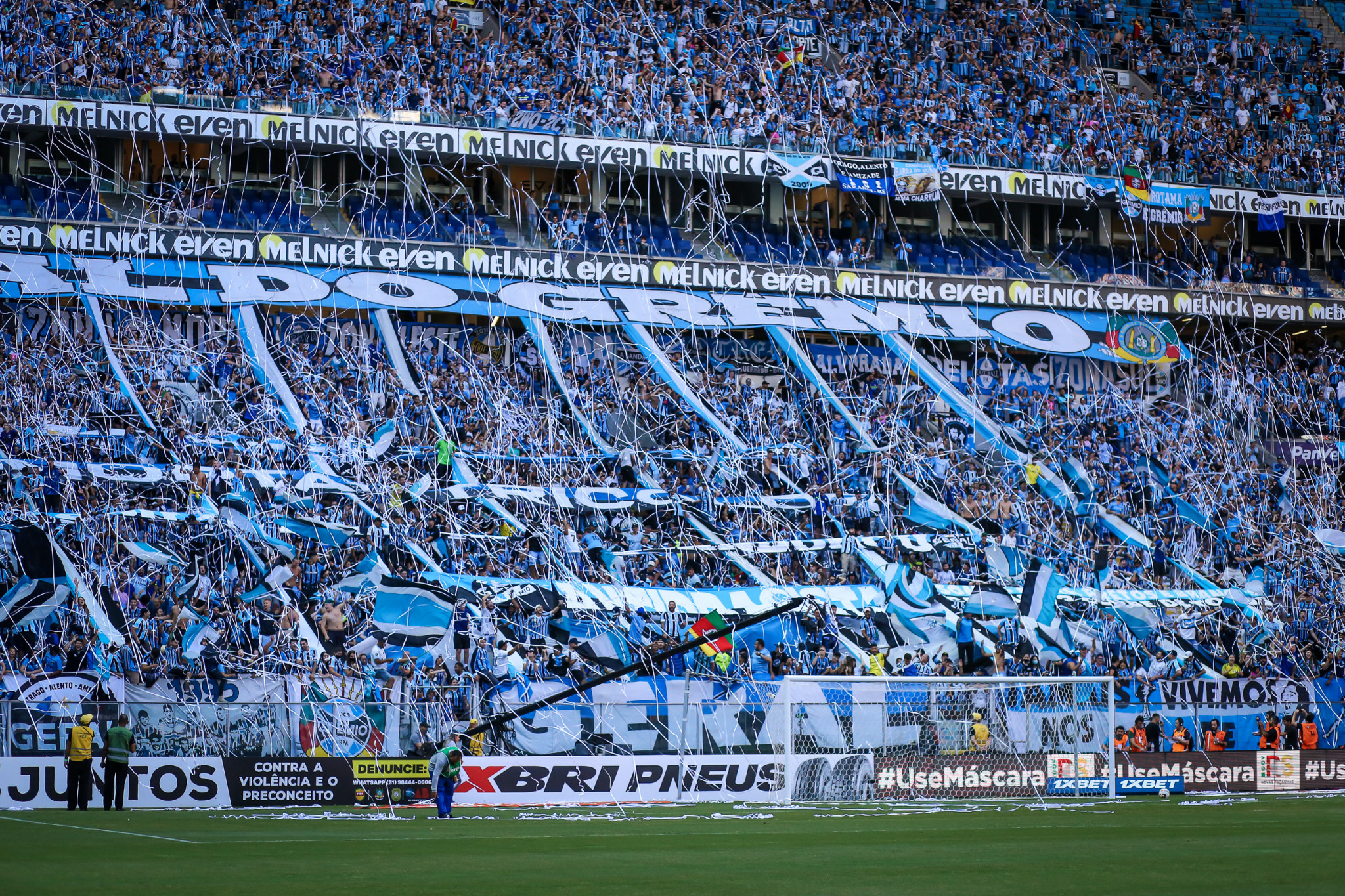
Geral do Grêmio, one of the first and largests groups organized in a Barra Brava style rather than a traditional Brazilian Torcida Organizada

Generally speaking, the torcidas organizadas have a different supporting style to the barra bravas and ultras: firstly, torcidas wear their own uniforms when attending games rather than the club's uniforms, sometimes it is a color that differs from their club's primary color, e.g. Palmeiras Mancha Verde wears white while Torcida Jovem (Sport Recife) wears yellow as opposed to the club's red-and-black. Additionally, they sing all the time, usually the anthem of the club or songs that are known even to those that are not part of a torcida. These songs are usually played along with drum beats and other musical instruments, although most are not allowed inside the stadiums. Other significant differences are the enormous flags that are made and expected by everyone in the stadiums. The torcidas usually display a team logo, or even a gigantic team shirt, but a constant in these flags is a reference to the torcida that made them.

The reason why torcidas constantly sing is because they believe it is important to support the team, no matter what is occurring on the field. That is why it is so common to see the crowd singing, even if the opposing team has just scored a goal. However, during the half-time, the torcidas tend to organize small protests that are directed to the team manager or the team president, in order to express their dissatisfaction with recent decisions or even long-standing unfulfilled promises.

As for what concerns the players, the torcidas usually try not to point out a player who is not putting all of his best efforts to work. As matter of fact, many supporters who belong to torcidas cannot stand anyone around them criticizing the players, which often results in brawls in the middle of the crowd. However, it is quite common for torcidas to ask for a substitution, generally just by chanting the name of the player they wish to see playing. Although some believe such practice seems to diminish the other players' efforts, this situation is quite common in stadiums.

Some Brazilian Torcidas have organized themselves in a manner that resemble more like barra bravas or European ultras. Most notably, Geral do Grêmio - the largest of Grêmio one of the largest in Brazil - is styled after the Platinean barra bravas.

== See also ==
- Torcida Jovem
