= Bashundhara Kings Ultras =

Supporters group of Bashundhara Kings

- Nickname: Red Army
- Established: 29 April 2021; 5 years ago
- Type: Supporters' group, Ultras group
- Club: Bashundhara Kings
- Motto: Always supportive
- Location: Uttara Dhaka, Bangladesh
- Stadium: Bashundhara Kings Arena
- Stand: North Gallery
- Founder: MD Saruare Alam Khan; Omayes
- Colours

The Bashundhara Kings Ultras (BKU) (Bengali: বসুন্ধরা কিংস আল্ট্রাস) is a fan club supporting the Bashundhara Kings, a Bangladeshi football club. Established on 29 April 2021, it is recognized as the first registered fan club of its kind in Bangladesh, and is one of the largest fan clubs in the country. They have been allocated the North Gallery at matches, where they are positioned as mid-ground Ultra supporters.

The organization manages its members through various social media platforms, including Facebook, Instagram, Twitter, WhatsApp, and Telegram. The Bashundhara Kings Ultras are known for their use of colorful smoke and pyrotechnic effects during matches.

== History ==
On 29 April 2021, MD Saruare Alam Khan created the Facebook page Bashundhara Kings Ultras to promote support for the club and encourage wider interest in football within Bangladesh's domestic league. The group, managed by co-founders Omayes Sarkar and Mahmudul Rifat, gradually expanded membership on Facebook. On 1 February 2022, Bashundhara Kings Ultras was recognized as an "Official Fan Club" through a certificate signed by Bashundhara Kings President Md Imrul Hasan. The Ultras made their official gallery debut on 17 February 2022 and began organizing membership drives nationwide by establishing regional zones. The organization reports more than 500 members and volunteers.

== Innovations and influence ==
The Bashundhara Kings Ultras organize activities intended to specifically involve youth supporters in the stadium seating areas.

Beginning in mid-2022, the group introduced the use of colored smoke during matches. Over time, they also adopted fireworks, vuvuzelas, and drums as part of their matchday displays.

On 14 July 2023, during a match against Dhaka Abahani, the group displayed a large banner, or tifo, bearing its logo. The banner measured approximately 110 square metres (1,200 square feet) and was described as the largest banner of its kind displayed at a football match in Bangladesh to date.

In addition to matchday activities, the group operates futsal teams in Dhaka, Mymensingh, and Gopalganj.

== Smoke bomb controversy ==
Bashundhara Kings played their final match of the first season of the Bangladesh Challenge Cup against Mohammedan SC. In the 62nd minute, the referee did not award a penalty in the Kings' favor. In retaliation, members of the Bashundhara Kings Ultras threw four smoke bombs onto the field, and the match was halted for more than 10 minutes. In public remarks following the match, Mohammedan coach Alfaz Ahmed noted that he believed the actions of the Ultras helped the Bashundhara Kings win the game.

== Members ==
The Central Committee for the 2026–27 season was formed on 16 November 2025.

Position	Name
President	Omayes
General Secretary	Md Mahfojur Rahman
Organising Secretary	Mahamudul Rifat
Security & Discipline Secretary	Payel Ahmed
CAPO	Md Tufayel Ahmed Parvez
Treasurer	Fakhrul Islam
Media & Communication Secretary	Mohammed Masud Alam
Events & Travel Coordinator	Tawfiqul Hasan Rafi
Membership Secretary	Ashraful Islam Arif

== See also ==
- Bashundhara Kings
- Bashundhara Kings Arena
