= Barra brava =

Organized supporters' groups of football teams in Latin America

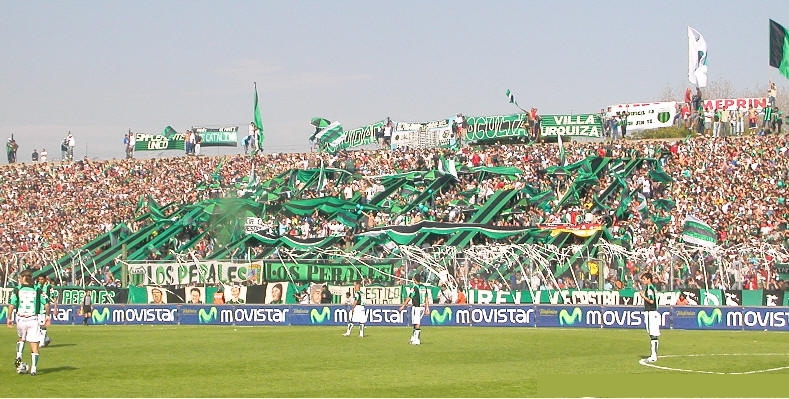
Members of barras bravas are scattered between the flags that they deploy. Here, barra brava of Club Atlético Nueva Chicago, from Argentina, is in the middle of the crowd.

Barra brava (lit. 'fierce group') is the name of organized supporters' groups of football teams in Hispanic America that provides fanatical support to their clubs in stadiums and provoke violence against rival fans as well as against the police.

Actions such as welcoming the team when it goes out to the pitch (by the use of pyrotechnics, throwing confetti and balloons, and displaying giant flags); waving and displaying of flags, banners and umbrellas; and the coordination of chants during the whole match, are characteristic of their fervent behavior, whose purpose is to encourage their team while intimidating referees and rival fans and players, for which they also provoke violence.

They also look to attack rival fans or defend their team' spectators from rival attacks (especially in away matches, where normally they are outnumbered by home fans) and police repression.

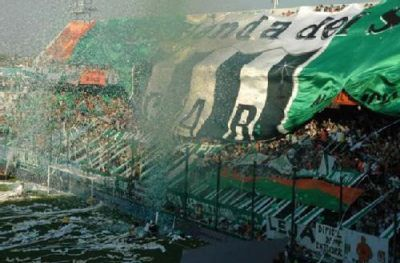
'Reception' is the name that football fans from some countries give to the choreography that the crowds exhibit in the stadiums for welcoming their teams when they go out to the pitch. Here, fans of Club Atlético Banfield, from Argentina, displaying a giant flag before a match.

These groups originated in Argentina in the 1950s and spread throughout the rest of Latin America. They are similar to hooligan firms, torcidas organizadas, and ultras.

== History ==
In Rioplatense Spanish slang, barra is a term used for 'group of people' (usually friends who share common interests and tend to frequent the same places). During the 1920s in Argentine football matches, some fan groups (called barras) stood out among the public for their fervent behavior, which sometimes included violent actions. These groups were irregular, and their violence arose spontaneously sometimes due to frustration caused by bad results of their team or as a way to influence the matches by intimidating referees and rival players with insults, throwing objects and occasionally entering onto the pitch to assault them. Sometimes they also attacked rival fans who used the same methods against their team. At the end of this decade, a few newspapers described one of this groups as a barra "brava" (Spanish for fierce), appearing the words barra brava together for the first time, but not yet like a term.

For example, one of those groups appeared in 1927, supported San Lorenzo de Almagro and was named La barra de la goma ("The group of the rubber") by the press. The nickname comes from the use of rubber taken from bicycle inner tubes, filled with sand and tied with wire at the ends, to attack opposing fans. They sometimes also threw objects at opposing players to annoy them when they were supposed to intervene in the match.

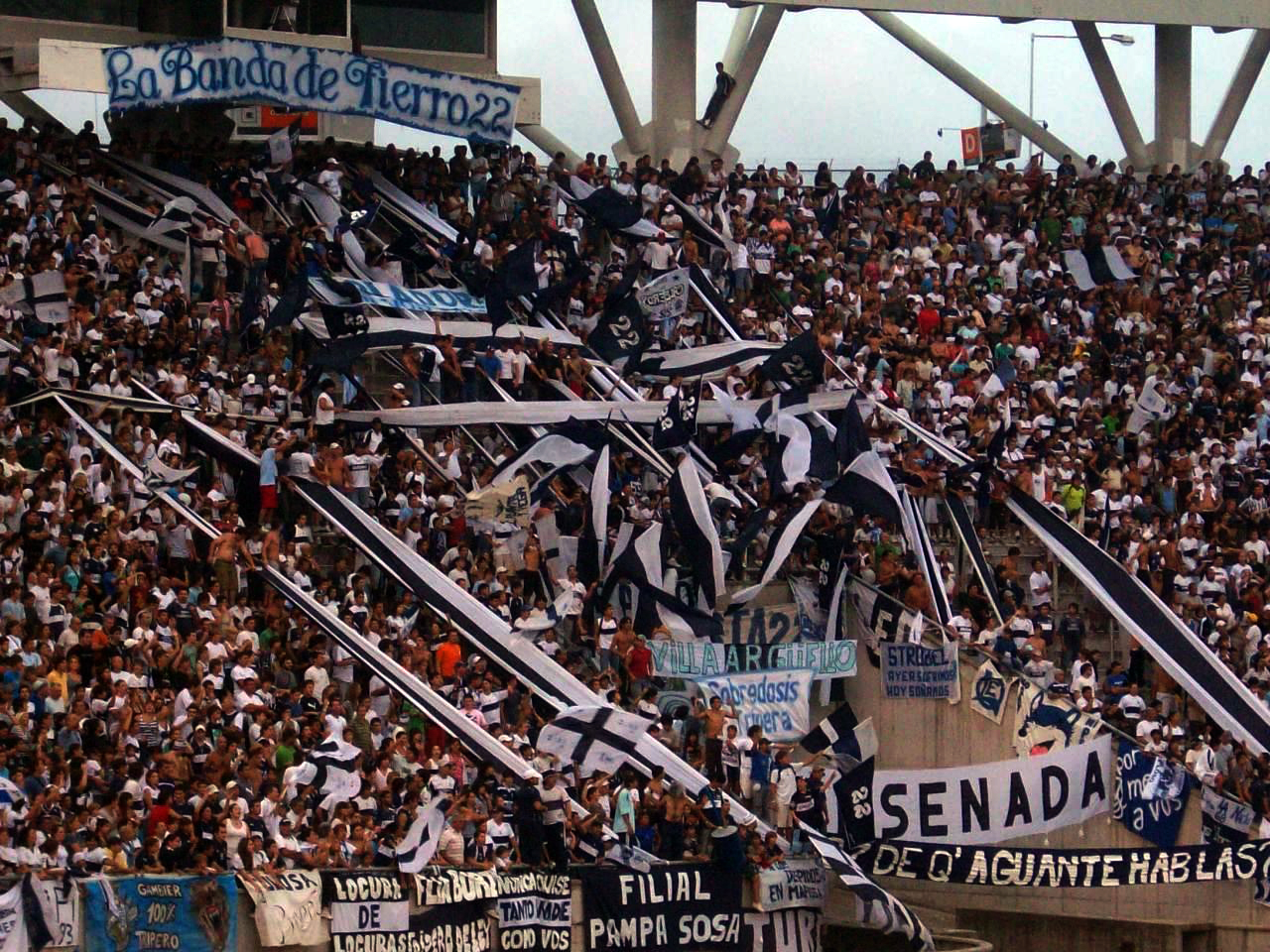
The barra brava is recognizable by their flags. Here, La Banda de Fierro, barra brava of Gimnasia y Esgrima La Plata.

These barras became a traditional part of the Argentine football crowds and evolved until each team had a main one, which in the 1950s began to be considered by club directors as a fundamental part of the fanbase due to their ability to intimidate and repel or respond to attacks from rival fans, especially in away matches. That's how in some occasions they started to receive some tickets or even paid rides to the stadiums. Argentine journalist Amílcar Romero stated that, before the appearance of such groups, when a team played away, they were intimidated by home fans. Barras bravas were a response to this pressure, so each club started to have its own one, partially financed by the club leadership. Access to benefits (as tickets) was controlled by group's leaders, and to gain prestige, a member had to be violent.

In Argentine football, it was well established that if you played as the visiting team, you were inexorably in a tight spot. Although they were not barras bravas as we know them today, local fans would pressure you, and the police, when not looking the other way, would pressure you as well. That had to be offset by a doctrine that in the next decade [the 1950s] became common currency: the only means by which to neutralize any effectual group with a reputation and capacity for violence, is with another, closer-knit group with as great, or greater, reputation for violence.

— Amílcar Romero

While intimidation towards referees, and rival players and supporters was previously spontaneous, from that moment on it would be a primary objective along with encouraging the team, and another one came to be defending fans and players of their club from the attacks of rival supporters and police repression. This increased fights and riots, that occurred more frequently before and after the matches outside of stadiums, although many also occurred on the terraces during the games (sometimes leading to their suspension).

In 1958, media began to take notice of the existence of barras bravas after the riots that occurred at the José Amalfitani Stadium during and after a match between Vélez Sarsfield and River Plate. The latter team was losing 0–1, and some of its fans, located in a terrace behind one of the goals, began throwing stones at the home team goalkeeper. Four minutes before the end of the match, a knife was thrown at him, hitting him in the arm, causing bleeding. The referee then decided to end the match, prompting those fans to throw more stones and invade the pitch in an attempt to attack the goalkeeper, so the police also entered and fired with their tear gas rifles to the rioters' terrace. An 18-year-old bystander named Alberto Mario Linker was knocked unconscious by a tear gas canister that hit him in the head, and then he was taken to a hospital where he died a few hours later. Meanwhile, the riots continued outside the stadium, where the violent group of River Plate fans clashed with police, damaging shops, homes, a fire truck, and a railway station, while a train was destroyed. There were 24 arrests and 4 cops injured.

Police and rioters were criticized by the media, and newspaper La Razón mentioned the existence of barras fuertes (strong groups) in Argentine football that were already known by many people, differentiating them for the first time from the traditional barras as being more organized, hierarchical, and coordinated, as observed among River Plate' rioters on that occasion. In an official statement, law enforcement blamed fans for the incidents. Ezequiel Niceto Vega (chief of Argentine Federal Police back then) said the tragedy was caused by people who were at the stadium "prepared to commit vandalism".

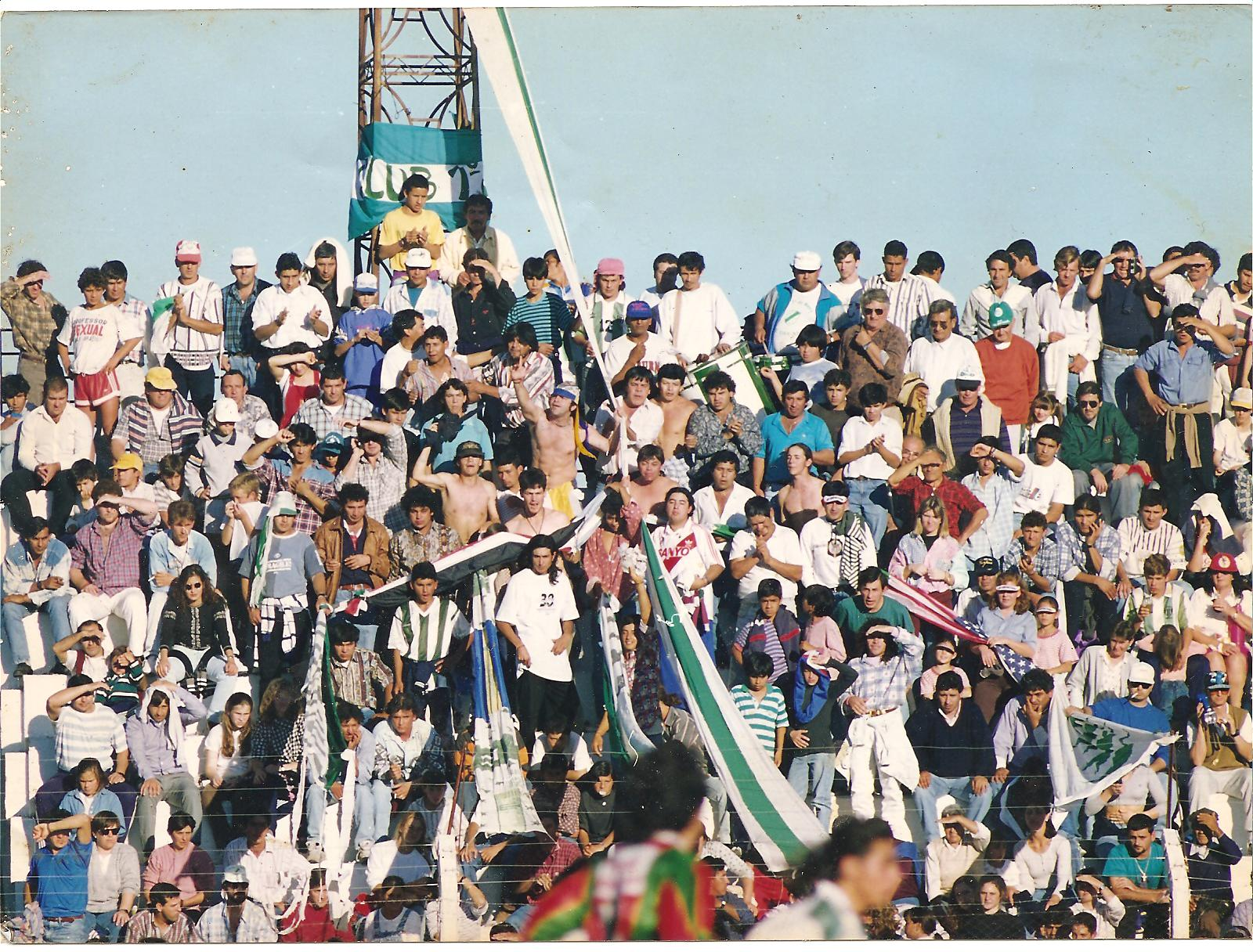
Crowd of Club Deportivo 1º de Mayo (team that usually plays in one of the lowest divisions of Argentine football), from Chajarí, in the 1990s with its barra brava in the center (composed by a few dozen members in that moment).

The term barra brava used as today, appeared in Argentine media in the 1960s, but became popular in the 1980s. Until the early 1990s, members of this groups in Argentina rejected that term (many even today) for considering it pejorative, and prefer being denominated as fanbase/crowd's guides (largely because if a supporter group it's identified as a defined group of people that is involved in illegal acts, the Argentine justice can judge the members as participants of an illicit association, a legal figure that hardens the penalties).

Although since the beginnings of Argentine football there were many fights and riots carried out by fans, players, club leaders, and police (with the first registered death caused by violence in 1923), the death of Alberto Mario Linker signaled the beginning of an era of habituation to violence. During the following decades, riots and deaths increased at the same time that barras bravas organized and multiplied.

According to some studies, Argentina has the most dangerous organized supporters' groups in the world. Through August 2012 Argentine football has experienced more than 200 deaths related to hooliganism. Since 2013, all visiting fans were banned from matches of the first division.

== Characteristics ==
These groups deploy and wave flags (that in Argentine football slang are called trapos -rags), banners and umbrellas (with their team's uniforms), and use musical instruments (such as drums and, since the mid-2000s, trumpets) to accompany their chants. They occupy terraces where viewers must stand, while in all-seater stadiums (rare in Argentina), barras bravas also remain standing throughout the match. The most characteristic flags are shaped like giant strips several meters in length (called trapos largos -long cloths- or tirantes -suspenders-), that are deployed from the top of the terrace to the bottom. Each group usually also has a banner with its name.

Traditionally, many members (usually important ones) stand upon the crush barriers that are placed in terraces to prevent crushing. In order to not fall from there, they hold on from a "suspender" (this was the purpose for making these flags shaped like strips), the body of someone else that is by his side and sustained to the flag, or the hand of some supporter that is standing below (in the floor).

They start and coordinate most of the chants, wave the most important flags, and always are located in the center of the terrace that they occupy. Until the group enters onto the terrace (usually a few minutes before or sometimes after the match starting), the center is not occupied by the crowd (even if the terrace it is almost filled). It is left empty to show respect for the place of the barra brava.

Originally these groups were not very numerous or powerful. Over the years, this changed to the point of cases where the barra brava decided who would be the club's chairman. Since the 1980s and 1990s, hooliganism has grown and some groups engaged in illegal activities such as extorting money from club leadership, players and hawkers that work at the stadium and surroundings, sell tickets (that are given by club leaders) to matches on the black market, charge for parking in the vicinity of the stadium, etc. Many members also steal (participating in burglaries, larcenies and robberies, sometimes even being part of criminal organizations) or sell drugs as a way to obtain money for travels (club leaders do not pay the travel for the whole group when the destination is too far), the making of flags or buying elements (balloons, confetti, pyrotechnics, etc.) used in the team's receptions on the pitch. They often provide services to political and union leaders who hire them as agitator groups (during rallies and mass meetings, that in Argentina traditionally have people chanting like football crowds, playing drums and even shooting firecrackers), goon squads (clashing with supporters of other political parties, unions or police during demonstrations, protests, rallies and strikes), bodyguards, etc.

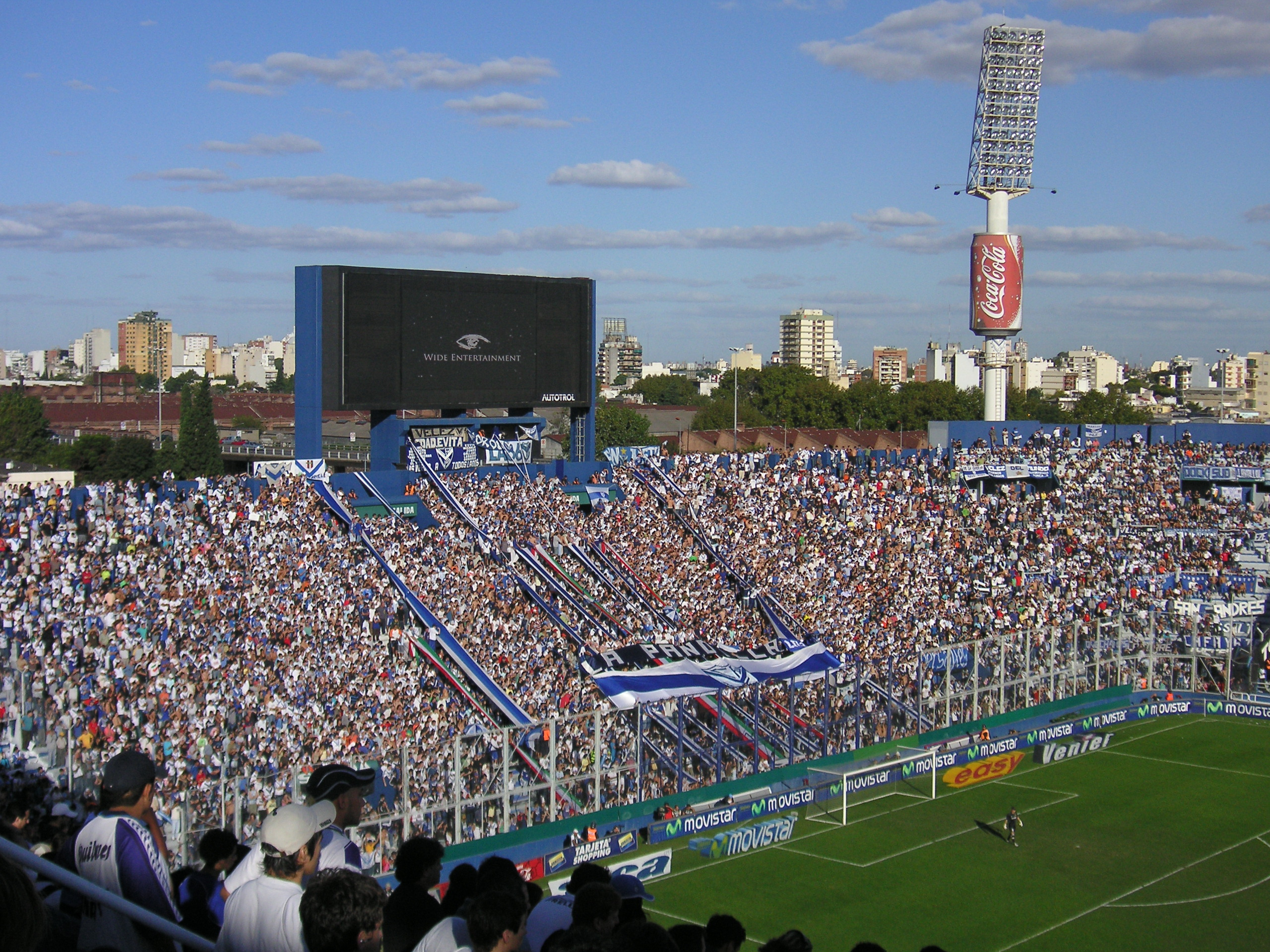
La Pandilla (Vélez Sarsfield's barra brava) located in the center of the main terrace of José Amalfitani Stadium (from Buenos Aires) with its "suspenders"

They are funded also by club leadership, which may give salaries to some members or even a percentage of the profits. Also, when the stadium of some club is used for a non-football event (like music concerts), usually the club's barra brava members are employed as security guards to take care of the facilities.

In Argentina, since the 2000s, a large percentage of deaths related to football were related to internal disputes within barras bravas, emerging subgroups into it that sometimes even had its own names.

The size of a barra brava is generally related to the level of the club's popularity (however, some clubs have big ones without being very popular). Group sizes range from a dozen of members in very small clubs, to more than a thousand in important ones (groups with several hundred of members or more started to appear in the 1980s -before that decade such groups weren't so big-), all of them with a hierarchical structure that gets stronger and more complex when the group's size is bigger. There are also many small clubs (with very few fans) that do not have a barra brava.

== See also ==
- Association football culture
- Casuals
- Curva
- Hooliganism
- Major football rivalries
- Supporters' groups
- Torcida organizada
- Ultras
