= Supporters' group =

Fan clubs in sports

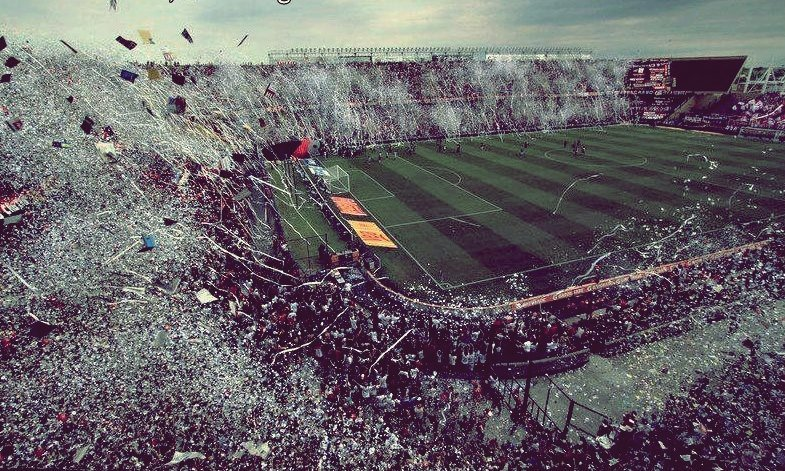
In football, the fundamental purpose of the fans is to encourage their team during the match.

A supporters' group or supporters' club is an independent fan club or campaign group in sport, mostly association football.

Supporters' groups in continental Europe are generally known as ultras, which derives from the Latin word ultrā, meaning beyond in English, with the implication that their enthusiasm is 'beyond' the normal. In the Anglosphere, these groups are generally known as "supporters' groups". Most groups in the United States, Canada, United Kingdom, and Australia call themselves "supporters' groups"; however, some do self-identify as ultras, particularly in communities with large Spanish, French, or Italian speaking populations. In Mexico, they are called porras, while in South America they are called either hinchada (plural of hincha, a Spanish word that was first used in Uruguay to refer to a single fan or supporter) or, exclusively in Brazil, torcida (plural of torcedor, which means 'supporter' in Portuguese) and fanaticada (plural of 'fan' in Portuguese). All of these terms are most commonly used to refer to the whole crowd of a team in the stadium and not just the groups within those crowds that lead the chants and display of choreographies and flags.

These groups in particular are barras bravas in Argentina and torcidas organizadas in Brazil (where there are also barras bravas, but are less in comparison). Both (but especially barras bravas) are organised supporters' groups that are not only focused on supporting their team and intimidating rivals, but also on antagonizing opposing fans, or defending (themselves and the rest of their club's supporters) from police repression or attacks by rival groups.

Supporters' groups and ultras are renowned for their fanatical vocal support in large groups, defiance of the authorities, and the display of banners at stadiums, which are used to create an atmosphere to intimidate opposing players and supporters, as well as cheering on their own team.

== Characteristics ==
Supporters' groups are usually centered around a core group (who tend to have executive control over the whole group), with smaller subgroups organised by location, friendship, or political stance. Supporters' groups tend to use various styles and sizes of banners and flags with the name and symbols of the group. Some supporters' groups sell their own merchandise such as scarves, hats, and jackets. The resulting culture is a mix of several supporting styles such as scarf-waving and chanting. A supporters' group can number from a handful of fans to hundreds, and often claim entire sections of a stadium for themselves.

According to a writer for Spiked, the four core points of the ultra mentality are:

- never stop singing or chanting during a match, no matter the result
- never sit down during a match
- attend as many games as possible (home and away), regardless of cost or distance
- loyalty to the stand in which the group is located

Supporters' groups usually have a representative who liaises with the club owners on a regular basis, mostly regarding tickets, seat allocations, and storage facilities. Some groups sell their own merchandise to raise funds for performing displays. Some clubs provide groups with cheaper tickets, storage rooms for flags, and banners and early access to the stadium before matches in order to prepare displays. These types of favoured relationships are often criticised as an abuse of power. and for displaying banners and flags, which hinder the view of those sitting behind.

=== Match day ===
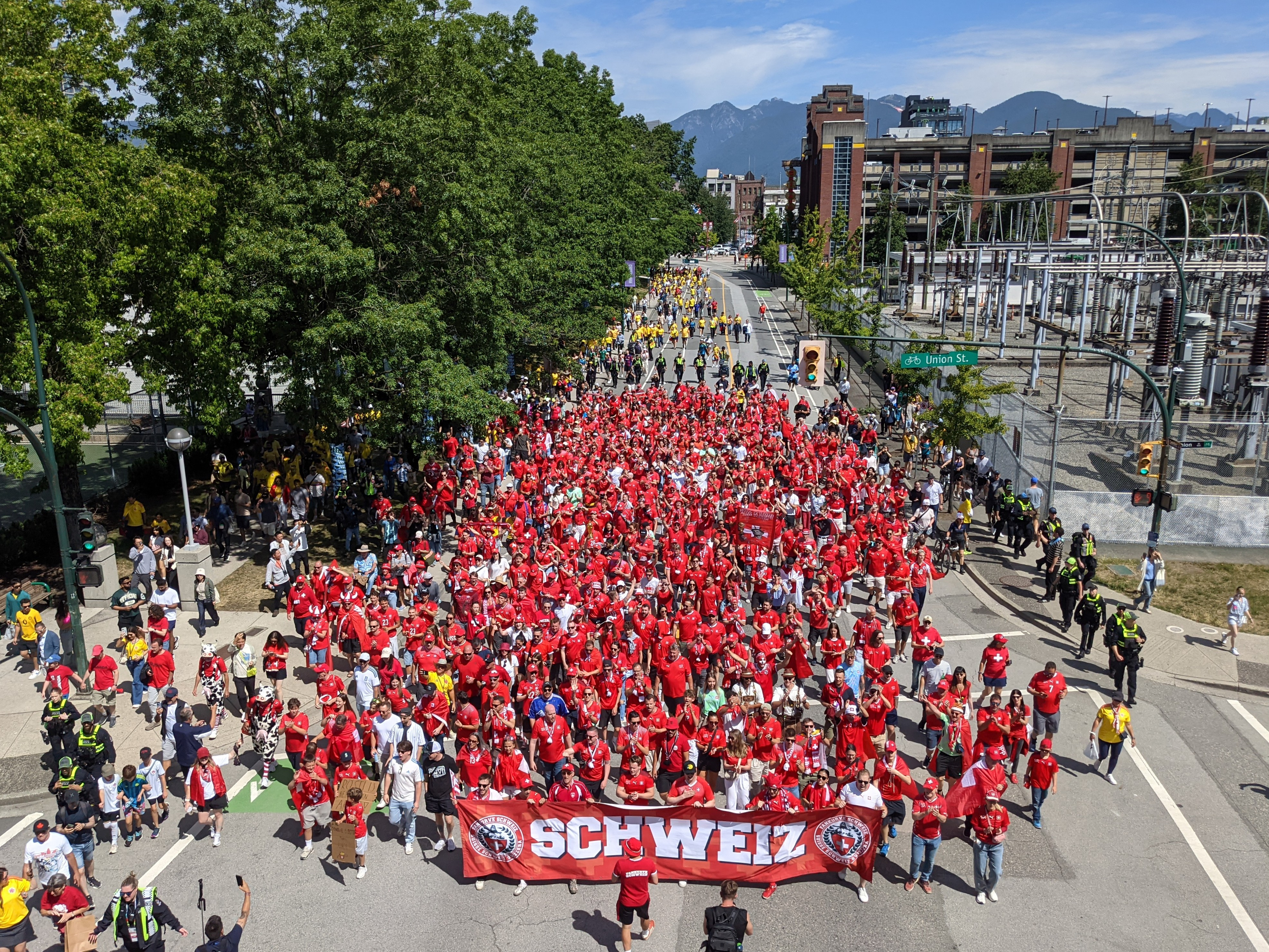
Supporters' of the Switzerland national football team march to BC Place Vancouver for a Round of 16 match against Colombia during the 2026 FIFA World Cup.

During matches of significant importance, many supporters' groups choreograph a large overhead display that is displayed just in the section of the stadium where the group is located or the entire stadium. Sometimes, small sheets of plastic or paper are held aloft to form a pattern, or to colour the stadium. Such a display is called a "mosaic" or "card display". Other materials used in certain types of displays include balloons, streamers, huge banners, flares, smoke bombs, and at times, giant dolls. Popular culture icons are often used on banners. Corporate brand logos and catchphrases are also often used. The displays, which can be expensive to make, often take months to prepare. All of the supporter-provided overhead displays, two-poles, banners, etc. are called tifo.

Supporters groups tend to be highly vocal at matches, with each group having several football chants. The melodies are mostly taken from popular songs.

=== Hooliganism ===
Unlike hooligan firms, whose main aim is to fight fans of other clubs, the main focus of supporters' groups is to support their own team. Unlike some hooligans, who try to be inconspicuous when they travel in ways such as not wearing team colours in order to avoid detection by the police, team supporters tend to have a bolder attitude, and are more conspicuous when they travel. They proudly display their scarves and club colours while arriving en masse, which allows the police to keep a close eye on their movements. Although supporters' groups can become violent, the vast majority of matches go ahead with no violent incidents.

== By region ==
=== Oceania ===
The main supporter group of the Australia national soccer team is Socceroos Active Support (SAS). SAS was founded in January 2015 as an independent group, that uses social media to organise and keep in touch. This replaced the former active support group Terrace Australis, who were founded by the FFA and fans in 2013, during Australia's 2014 World Cup qualification campaign. Its establishment came in the wake of poor off-field action and minimal community engagement. Previously, the emergence of Terrace Australis saw the Green and Gold Army relinquish its role as a hub for active support, which it had claimed since its establishment in 2001.

The main supporter group of the Australia national rugby league team is The Roo Crew.

The supporters of the New Zealand national football team are known as the 'White Noise', a play on the All Whites nickname.

The official South Sydney Rabbitohs supporter group is known as "The Burrow". Their active supporter group is known as "Gate38" and is made up of young men who were involved in the "scumgate" scandal in 2013. The Rabbitohs also have a large supporter base in Perth, where they rival the Fremantle Dockers in supporter size.

The official New South Wales rugby league team supporter group is known as "Blatchy's Blues".

The official Queensland rugby league team supporter group is known as "Maroon Crusade".

The official Gold Coast Titans supporter group is known as "The Legion".

The official Canberra Raiders supporter group is known as "The Greenhouse".

The Brisbane Broncos have the largest fan base of any NRL club and they have been voted the most popular rugby league team in Australia for several years. A Broncos supporters' group called "The Thoroughbreds", made up of prominent businessmen, made an unsuccessful bid to purchase News Ltd's controlling share of the club in 2007.

The Bulldogs Army is the core support group for the Canterbury-Bankstown Bulldogs, with the section they sit within known as 'The Kennel'. To be sitting in this section, supporters must become a member of the club itself and register any large flags and/or banners which are brought to the game. At all away games the Bulldogs Army locates themselves in the general admission section. The main aim of the Bulldogs Army is to show support and passion for the Bulldogs.

As the region's traditional local representatives, the Bulldogs predominantly draw on a support base in and around the suburbs of Canterbury and Bankstown in south-western Sydney, although in recent years club administration and home matches have relocated to Sydney Olympic Park. The Bulldogs are the most supported NRL club in regional NSW – over 25% of Bulldog fans are located in regional NSW, over 25% are located outside of NSW and over 10% are located in QLD. The club has one of the highest average attendances in the league: over the 2010 season, it was one of only two clubs to record an average home crowd of more than 20,000.

The multicultural demographics of the suburbs in the club's support base, such as Lakemba, means the club has a large number of supporters from a range of non-Anglo ethnicities. In recent years the club has become particularly identified in the media with the Lebanese and the Greek community, particularly with the club's former star goalkicker Hazem El Masri, being a Lebanese immigrant who migrated from Lebanon as a young child. The Greek community has a huge history of Greeks playing for the club dating back to the 1970s with club legend George Peponis, being a Greek immigrant who migrated from Greece as a very young child who captained the Bulldogs and Australia. El Masri retired at the end of the 2009 season.

The Melbourne Storm's supporter base grew from almost 500,000 in 2004 to almost 800,000 in 2009, making them the fourth most popular rugby team. The club's supporter group, the "Graveyard Crew", make an Aussie-rules-(AFL) style banner for the team to run through in important matches.

The Sydney Roosters have a strong support base across Australia. Aside from its traditional fan base in Sydney, which is most concentrated in its homeland in the affluent eastern suburbs, the club is also popular in South East Queensland, Canberra and Newcastle. The club has an internet message board for supporters, "The Wall", which has been the official forum since 1999. The club has announced that "The Wall" will be closing as of late January 2012. "The Chookpen" is an unofficial site.

In 2013 the club tallied the fourth-highest home attendance of all National Rugby League clubs (behind the Brisbane Broncos) with an average of 19,368 spectators at the Sydney Football Stadium.

At the club's home ground, the Sydney Football Stadium, the supporters congregate in distinct sections. The "Chook Pen", a designated area in Bay 35, is the preferred location for the most animated fans. Members of the Sydney Cricket and Sports Ground Trust are seated in the Members' Stand on the western side of the ground, and season ticket holders are located just beneath the Members' area, in Bays 12–14.

In 2014, the Roosters had nearly 17,000 paying members, in addition to the 45,550 members of the Roosters' Leagues Club, which is the major benefactor of the football club. The Easts Leagues Club and the Sydney Roosters "operate as one entity" known as the Easts Group. Under this arrangement, the Eastern Suburbs District Rugby League Football Club is the 'parent company' of the Easts Group. The Football Club delegates, however, overarching responsibility for both football and leagues club operations to a single general manager who oversees the whole group's performance. The leagues club group provides financial support to the football club, only where necessary, as in recent years the football club's sponsorships and TV revenues are generally covering most Rugby League expenditures.

Port Adelaide Football Club has many supporter groups, with every state or territory containing at least one supporter group. In addition, many country towns within South Australia have their own supporter group, many of which travel to both home and away games.

- Port Adelaide Cheer Squad
- Alberton Crowd
- Interstate Groups

Active supporter groups in the A-League
Club	Supporter group(s)
Adelaide United	Red Army
Brisbane Roar	The Den, Brissy Youth
Central Coast Mariners	Yellow Army, Coastie Crew
Melbourne City	Bay 12, Riverside 32
Melbourne Victory	North Terrace, South End, Horda, Nomadi
Newcastle Jets	Terrace Novocastria
Perth Glory	The Shed, Perth Youth, Bay 136
Sydney FC	The Cove, Sektion 22
Wellington Phoenix	Yellow Fever
Western Sydney Wanderers	Red and Black Bloc, Northgate, AMOK, Westie Youth

There are also a number of English supporters' groups located in Australia for premiership teams and championship teams. The Hornets Down Under are an example of a championship supporters' group.

=== East Asia ===
In Japan, supporters' sections are mostly known as the oendan sections and are prominent at various sports, specially in baseball games and association football matches.

Baseball cheering is also common in Taiwan and South Korea

The supporters' group for the South Korea national football team is known as the Red Devils

=== South Asia ===
The India national football team has a supporters' group called the Blue Pilgrims. They were formed with a motive to support the national team and the U-17 team during the 2017 U17 World Cup held in India.

Mariners' Base Camp and East Bengal Ultras are the ultras fan group of Mohun Bagan Super Giant and East Bengal FC respectively, two of the oldest football clubs in Asia. Derbies of the two clubs called as Kolkata Derby often witness record breaking spectator, one such moment was during 1997 Kolkata Derby in the Federation Cup Semi-final, where a recorded crowd of 131,781 turned up for the match while the official capacity of the stadium was 120,000. Fans of the clubs formed in the early 2010's also created ultras fan group, like Manjappada, which supports Kerala Blasters FC, West Block Blues, which supports Bengaluru FC and some more.

Among the Bangladeshi Active Supporters' groups, there are The Black & White Warriors, which supports Mohammedan SC (Dhaka), Bashundhara Kings Ultras, which supports Bashundhara Kings, and Bangladeshi Football Ultras, which supports the Bangladesh national football team.

=== South America ===
In South America, barras bravas are the main supporter' groups. Similar to hooligan firms and ultras, the phenomenon originated in Argentina in the 1950s, but it has spread throughout most of the region during the following decades. This gang-like groups coordinate chants (which accompany playing bass drums and, less, trumpets) and display choreographies (like throw balloons, confetti, smoke bombs and firecrackers when their team goes out to the pitch; and wave banners, flags and umbrellas during the whole matches) to encourage their teams and intimidate rivals and referees, seek fights against opposing barras bravas and repel police repression.

These entities exercise substantial control and influence over football administration within their respective regions. This is particularly evident in Argentina, which maintains some of the largest and most prominent organized supporter groups globally.

The exception is Brazil, where the clubs have active supporter' groups named torcidas organizadas, who play a similar role to the barras bravas. However, the southern part of Brazil, in the south part of Santa Catarina and in all Rio Grande do Sul, contrary to the rest of the country, the supporter groups are barras bravas.

=== Continental Europe ===
In Europe, there are primarily three types of groups: official supporter groups, ultras, and hooligan firms.

Official supporter groups primary function is to liaise with the club board and protects supporter interest as well as have a say in the running of the clubs, and they usually represent all types of supporters of all ages ranging from fanatical supporters, to disabled supporters, to supporters who rarely frequent games, however they are still an independent body. The oldest of which is Torcida founded in 1950 as supporters of Hajduk Split from Croatia.

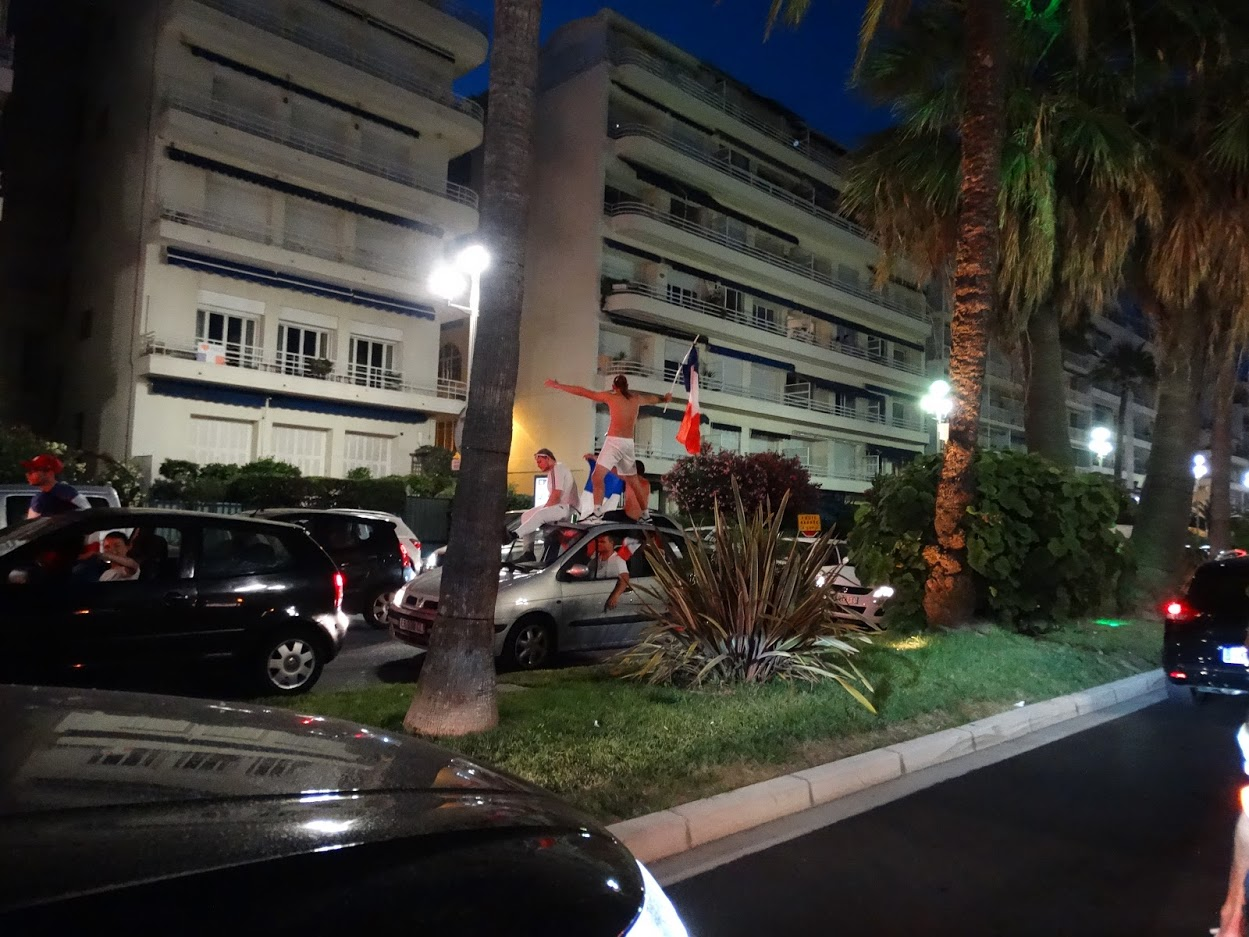
Nice celebrating the France national team's victory in the 2018 World Cup

Ultras groups are independent of the club; however, they too are frequently supported by the club as they cater to the majority of the most vocal and committed supporters, producing atmosphere and encouraging the players. However, frequent tensions also arise, due to often vocal and pro-active criticism of management or players and the illegality of some their actions, such as graffiti and lighting pyrotechnics during matches. Many ultras groups, to maintain their independence and raise money, run their own shops selling supporter merchandise, most commonly clothing such as supporter scarves, and sometimes in collaboration with the club match tickets.

Hooligan firms are largely restricted to a secretive sub-culture, due to the illegal nature of their activity. As they mostly socialise with other hooligans, they therefore have little contact with other sets of supporters.

In the past, the distinction between ultras and hooligans was blurred, with the majority being considered both. Due to the increase in condemnation and punishment of hooligan activity, the divide has become increasingly visible, however for some groups, especially groups who support smaller teams and therefore have less members, this divide is still very much blurred; some groups have started using the label hooltras.

=== Britain and Ireland ===
Most supporters' groups are not only officially endorsed by the affiliated club, but also recognised on the club's website and hold regular meetings at the stadium.

In England and Wales, nearly all official supporter groups are affiliated with the Football Supporters' Association. Leeds United has a number of supporters groups representing people with protected characteristics which include Punjabi Whites. LGBT fan group inclusion in Leeds United.

There are also numerous hooligan firms in Britain, also known as casuals in itself a style of support and sub-culture, stemming largely from the fact that Britain is the birthplace of the phenomenon of football hooliganism.

In the Republic of Ireland the supporters embrace a mixture of both ultra and casual styles.

=== North America ===
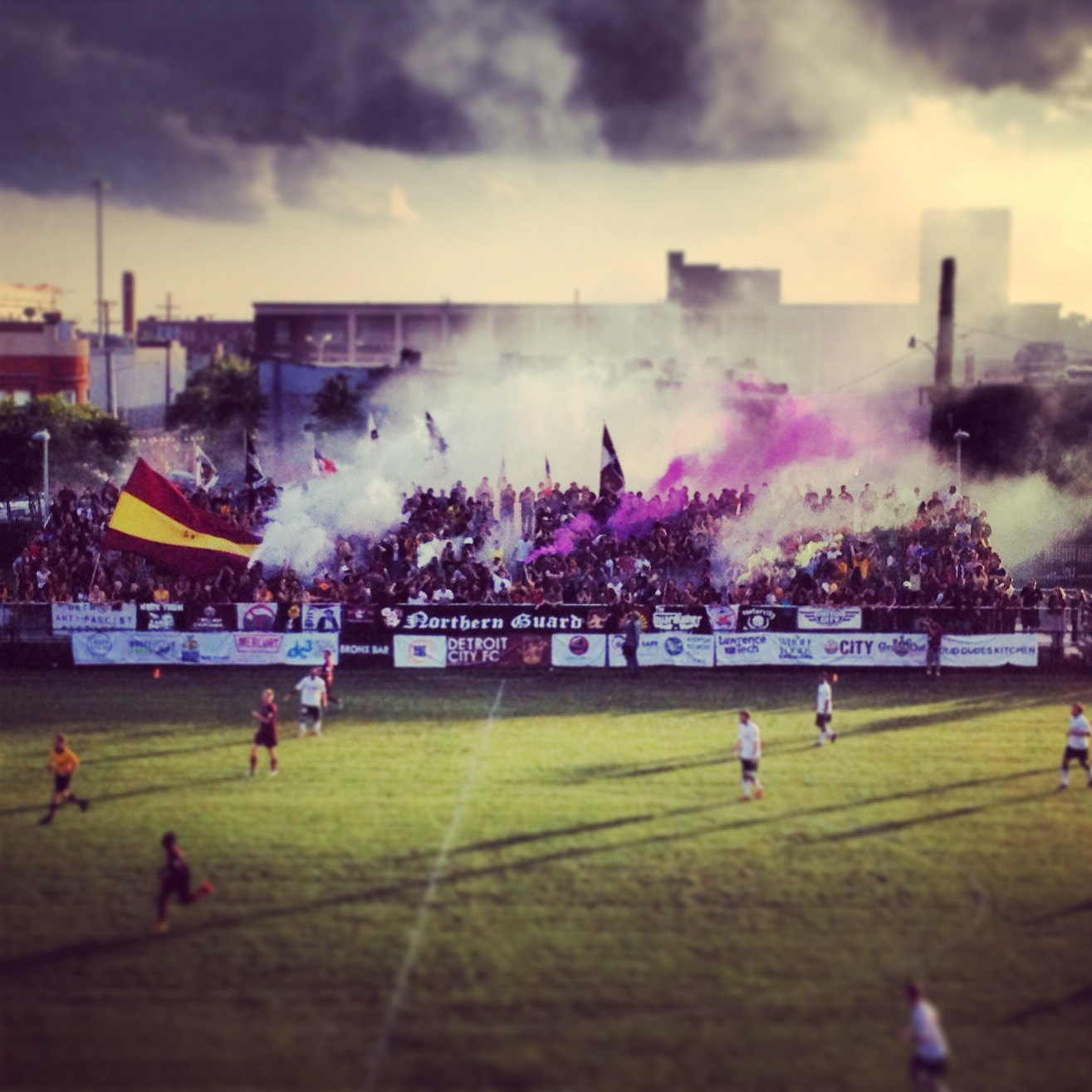
Detroit City FC's Northern Guard Supporters celebrate a goal in a National Premier Soccer League match.

The major supporters' group for the United States men's and women's national teams is The American Outlaws. The major supporters' group in Canada is The Voyageurs.

There are independent supporters' groups for teams in Major League Soccer (MLS), which operates in the United States and Canada, and the National Women's Soccer League (NWSL), as well as for many teams of the lower divisions of the United States soccer pyramid. Many of these groups are members of the Independent Supporters Council. MLS holds an annual "Supporters' Summit" to meet with the leadership of most of its supporter groups to discuss issues including security, self-policing, supporter group managed sections, and strategies for league success. Many teams in other leagues, including the National Premier Soccer League, USL Pro, USL Premier Development League, and North American Soccer League (2010) have associated supporters' groups. Supporters' groups can be found for some NCAA soccer programs such as Legion 1818 at Saint Louis University, Englemann Elite at the University of Wisconsin–Milwaukee, or the Red Cedar Rowdies, influenced by Detroit City FC's Northern Guard Supporters, at Michigan State University. In Canada, there are supporters' groups for all Canadian Premier League teams. There are also supporters' groups in cities hoping to get a CanPL team in the future.

Major League Baseball supporters' groups include Dodgers' Pantone 294 group and Oakland Athletics' Section 149.

NFL supporters' groups include the Raiders' Black Hole, Pittsburgh Steelers' Steel City Mafia, Arizona Cardinals' Bird Gang, and the New Orleans Saints Big Easy Mafia, which includes international chapters. The Dallas Cowboys, who bill themselves as "America's Team", and other successful teams such as New England Patriots, have supporters' groups around the U.S., and Jacksonville Jaguars' Bold City Brigade includes a UK chapter as part of its bid to promote Jaguars as London's "home team".

NHL supporters' groups include the New York Islanders' Blue and Orange Army and the Ottawa Senators' Red Scarf Union.

In Mexico there are porras, that are older and are not violent like the first ones. Some association football clubs in Mexico also have animation groups, which stage tifo and other choreographed displays. A brawl between groups at Querétaro-Atlas match in 2022 injured 20 fans and resulted in Liga MX banning animation groups from organizing in opponents' stadiums.

== See also ==
- Association football culture
- Barra brava
- Collective identity
- Curva
- Hooliganism
- List of hooligan firms
- Major football rivalries
- Torcida
- Ultras
