= Paulo Centurión =

Argentine footballer (born 1982)

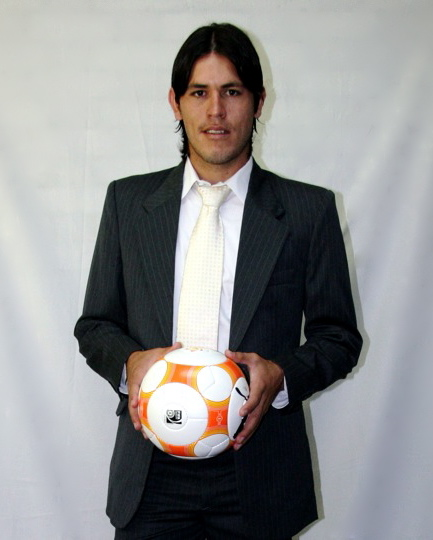
- Centurión in 2015

Personal information
- Date of birth: 8 December 1982 (age 43)
- Place of birth: Formosa, Argentina
- Height: 1.86 m (6 ft 1 in)
- Position: Defender

Senior career*
Years	Team	Apps	(Gls)
2004–2006	Guaraní		(1)
2006–2007	Comunicaciones		(1)
2007–2008	Guaraní		(1)
2008–2009	Municipal		(1)
2009–2010	Guaraní		(1)
2010–2011	River Plate Puerto Rico		
2011–2013	Sarmiento (Resistencia)	41	(0)
2013	Sol de América de Formosa	5	(0)
2014–	Antigua		(1)
2014–2015	Coatepeque	27	
2015	Universidad		
2016–2017	Deportivo Escuintla		(2)
2017–2018	Comunicaciones		(2)
- * Club domestic league appearances and goals

Paulo Centurion (born 8 December 1982) is an Argentine former professional footballer who played as a defender.

Centurión, son of retired international footballer Cristino Centurión, has played in Argentina, Paraguay, Guatemala and Puerto Rico.

== Career ==
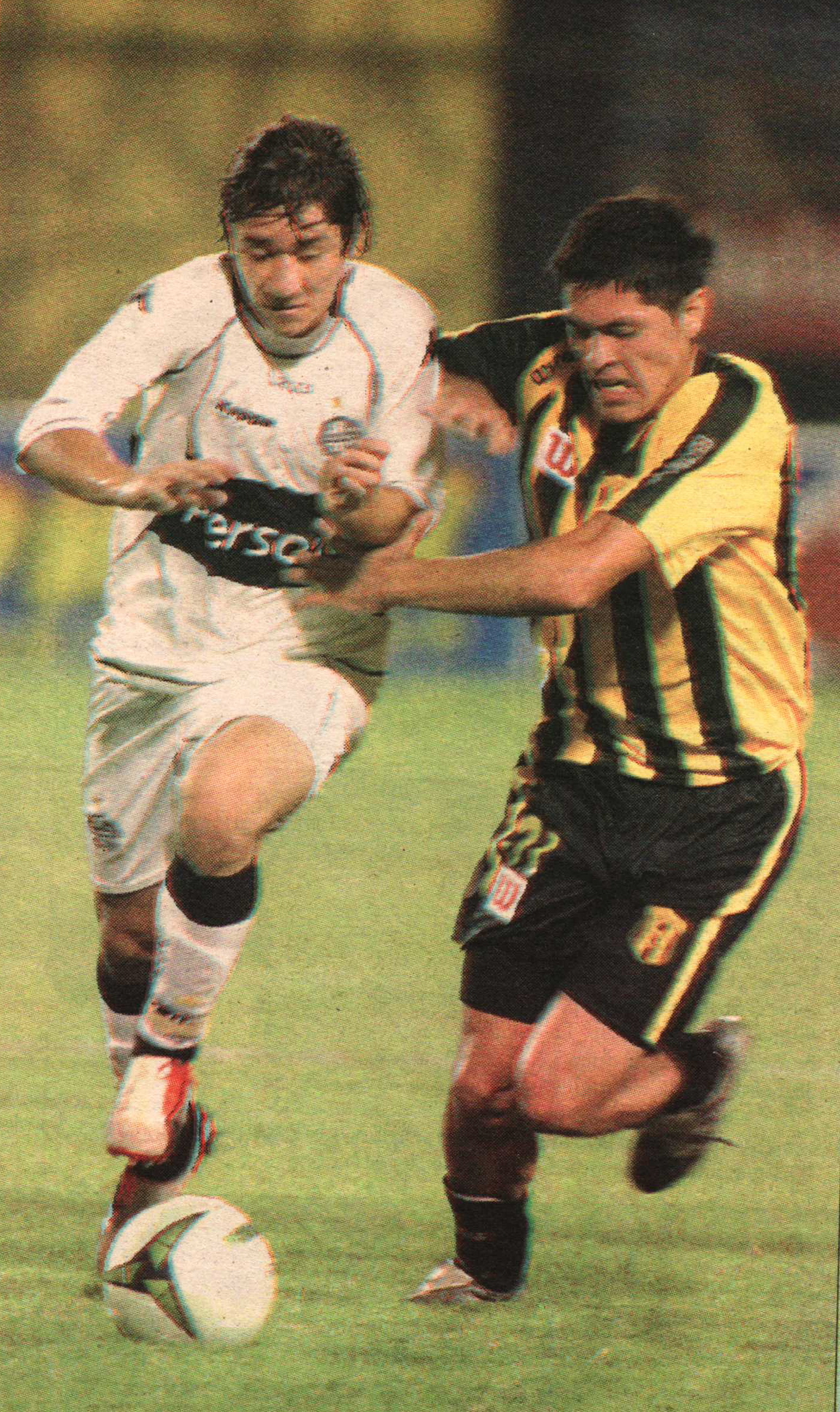
Centurión contesting the ball with José Montiel of Club Olimpia

=== Early career ===
Paulo Centurión made his debut in his native province of Formosa in 2002 at Club Sol de América in the first division of the regional Liga Formoseña de Fútbol, where he was the best defender of that season. In 2003, he moved to Club Defensa y Justicia, also in Formosa.

He later joined Club Guaraní of Paraguay and debuted as a professional player on 29 August 2004, against Club Nacional. He scored his first goal on 16 April 2006 against Club Fernando de la Mora.

=== Comunicaciones ===
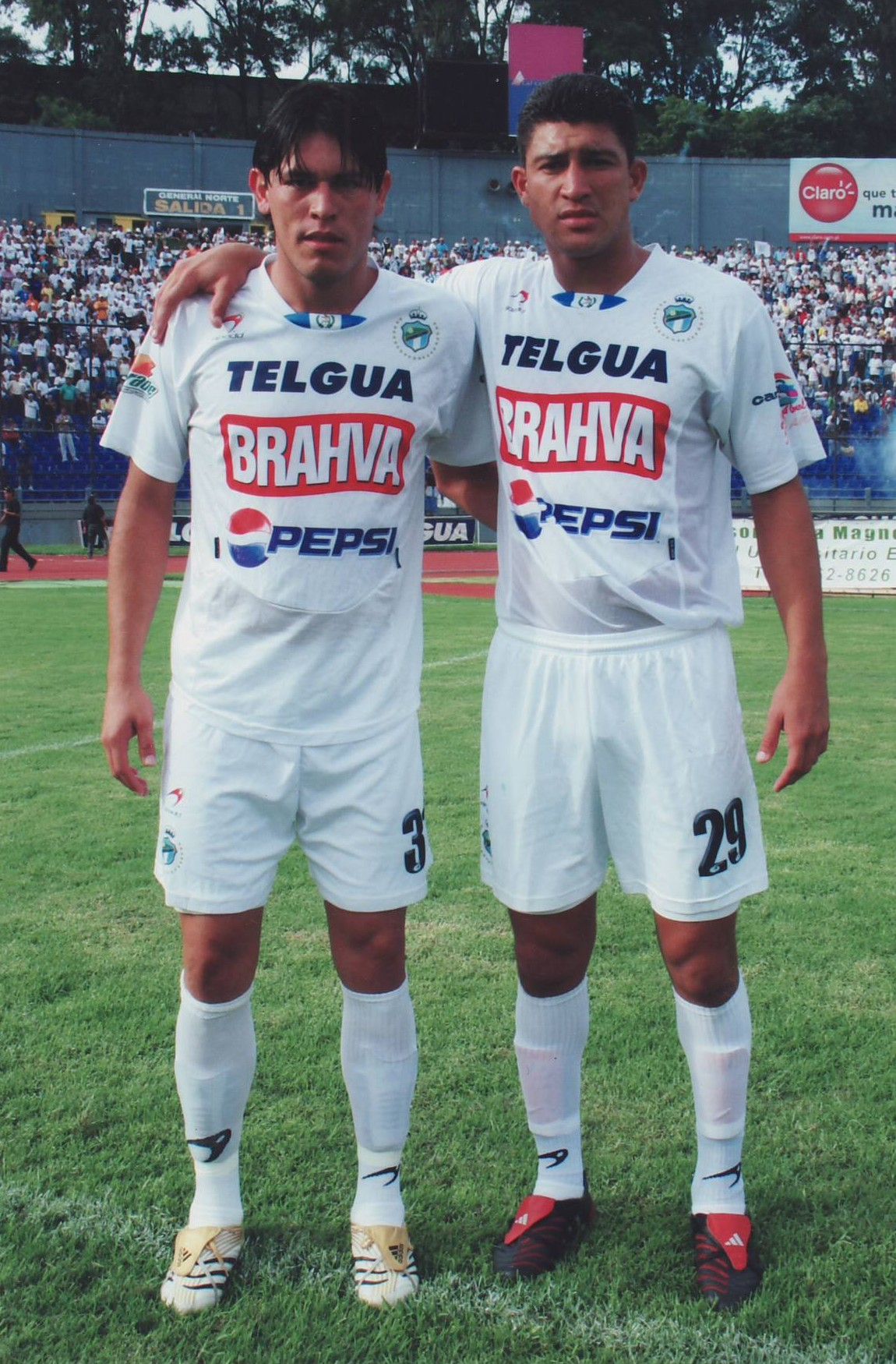
Centurion and Joel Benítez before the Guatemalan Clásico in October 2006

In June 2006, Comunicaciones of Liga Nacional de Guatemala signed Centurión on a one-year loan with an option to purchase. He made his official debut for the team on 30 July against Deportivo Suchitepequez, a match which ended in a 2–1 home loss.

Centurion finished runner-up with the club in the Apertura 2006 league tournament, where Comunicaciones lost the final to their archrival Municipal on away goals after a 1–1 draw on aggregate. Despite the loss, Centurión won the award for best Central defender of the Apertura.

In the 2007 Clausura on 7 March 2007, Centurión scored the first goal of the match in a 3–1 victory against Suchitepequez. Centurión played his last official match in a 2–1 win against Xelaju.

After a failure to reach an agreement between the respective clubs, Centurión left the club with a good image for his performance in the Torneo Apertura 2006 and Clausura 2007.

=== Club Guaraní ===
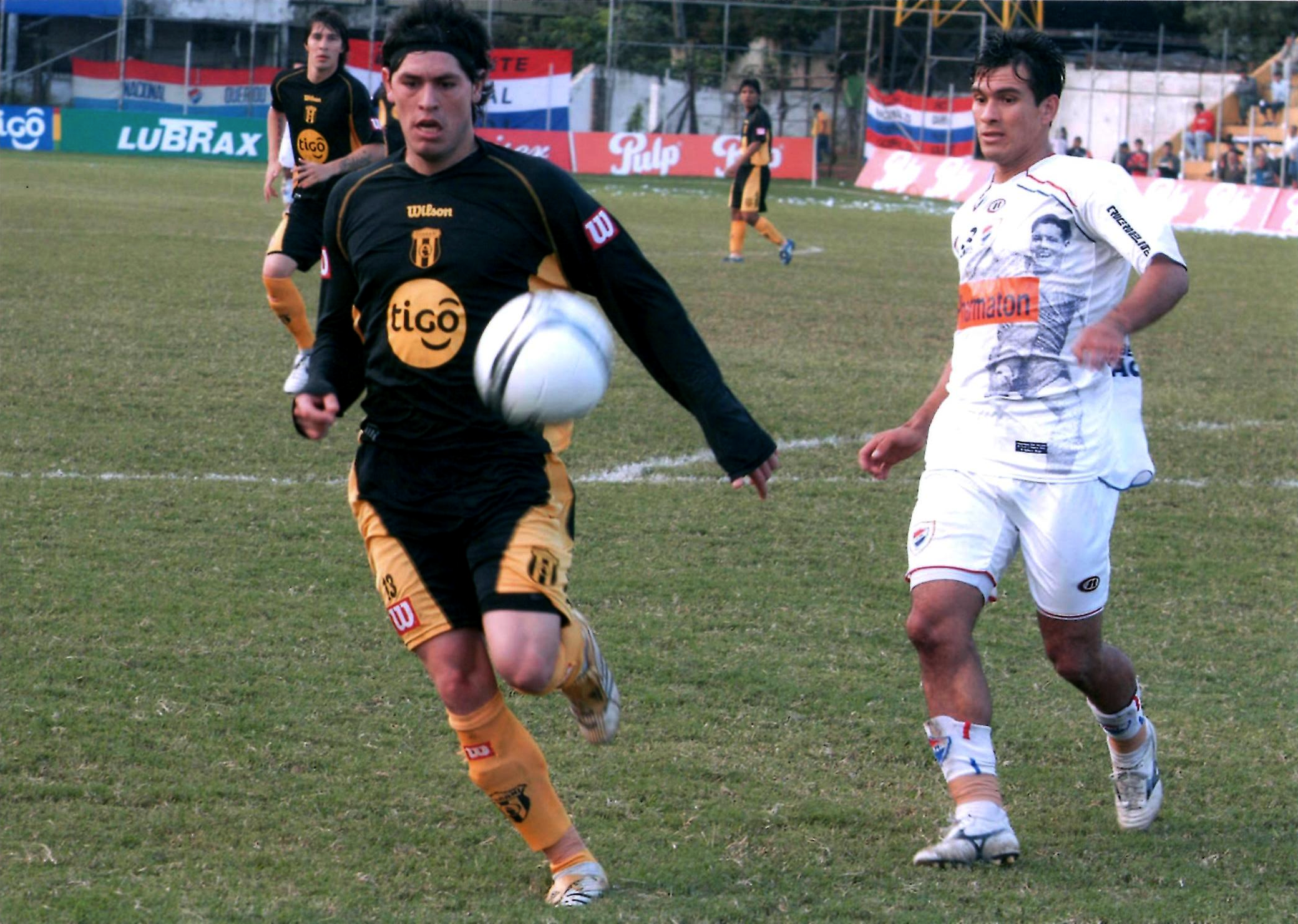
Centurión of Club Guaraní covering the ball against a Club Nacional player

After his time in Guatemalan soccer, Centurión returned to Paraguay to rejoin Club Guarani in July 2007.

There he played the Torneo Clausura 2007 and Torneo Apertura 2008. On 13 April 2008 during the Apertura, Centurión scored his third goal as a professional and second with Club Guarani, in a 2–2 draw against Sportivo Luqueño. His last match with Guarani occurred against Club Nacional on 29 June 2008.

=== Municipal ===
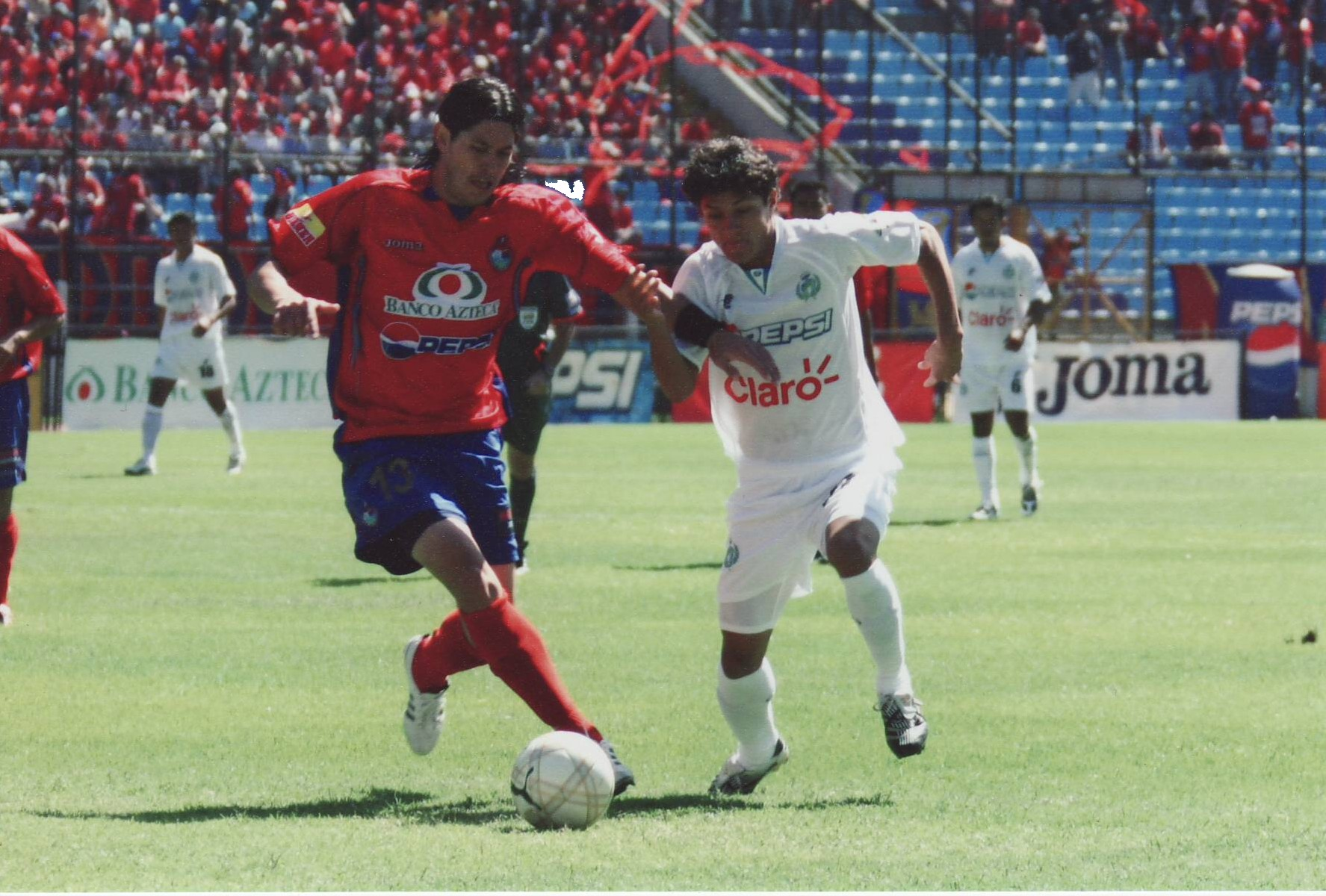
Centurión of Municipal and Jairo Arreola of Comunicaciones, former teammates now rivals contesting the ball in the Guatemalan Clásico

==== 2008 season ====
After the Apertura 2008 concluded, Municipal reached an agreement with Club Guarani and Centurión for a one-year loan with an option to purchase.

On 26 July 2008, Centurión made his official debut with Municipal, where the team faced Deportivo Xinabajul away from home and lost 2–1.

After placing second in the Torneo Apertura 2008, Municipal achieved direct qualification to represent the country in the 2008–09 CONCACAF Champions League. On 17 September 2008 in Torreón, Mexico, the club made its debut in the contest against Santos Laguna. Santos won 3–2 in an exciting match. Centurion and his team finished last in the group stage, with one win, three draws, and two losses. In their final match on 30 October 2008, Centurion participated the full 90 minutes, but gave away a penalty as his club tied group winners Santos 4–4.

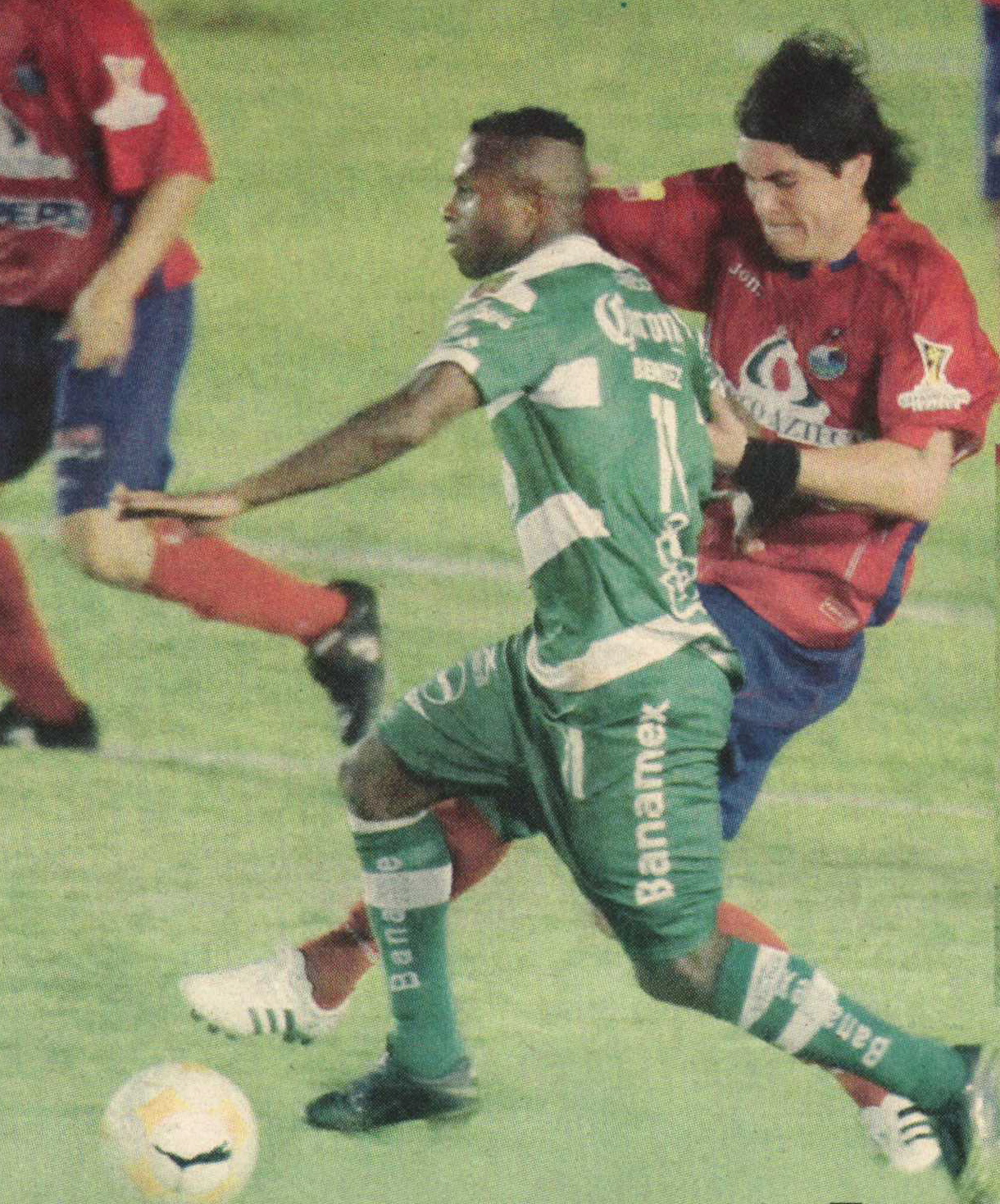
Centurión challenging for the ball with Ecuadorian forward Christian Benítez

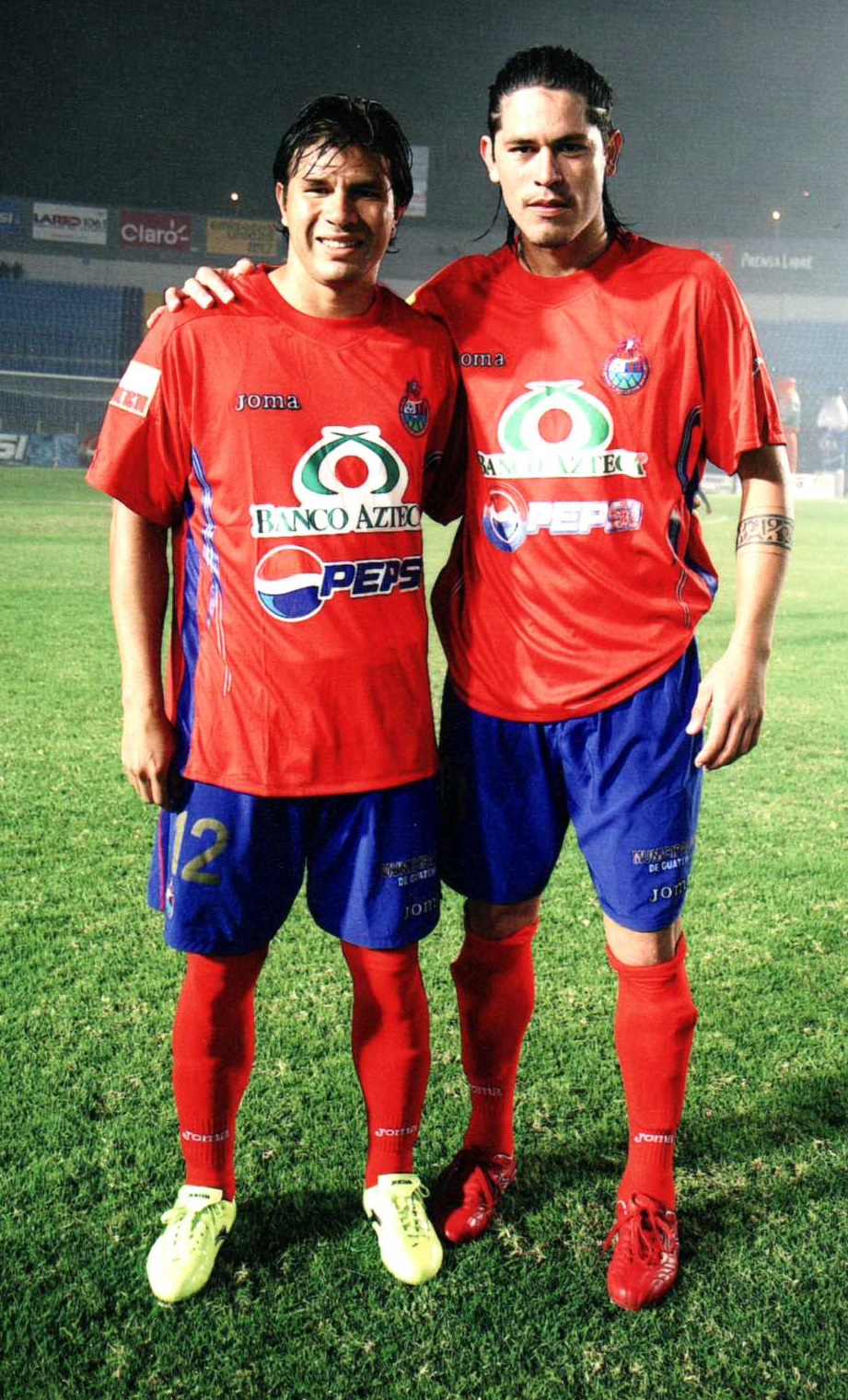
Centurión with Carlos González

In the league, the team eventually placed first in the regular season. In the semi-finals they disposed of Deportivo Xinabajul to set up a final with Comunicaciones. Comunicaciones ended up winning with a 3–2 aggregate score at Estadio Mateo Flores, leaving Centurión and his team empty handed without a trophy.

==== 2009 season ====
Centurión began the 2009 Torneo Clausura by scoring a goal on 19 April 2009 against Heredia Jaguares at home, where the team won 2–1. The team finished second in the regular season and advanced to the semi-finals, defeating Deportivo Suchitepequez 3–2 on aggregate with a great comeback after having lost the first leg 2–0. The Final would be played against Deportivo Jalapa, which resulted in a 4–1 loss on aggregate, again leaving Municipal empty-handed.

After failing to reach an agreement with Guarani, Centurión left the club where he contested the Torneo Apertura 2008, 2008–09 Champions League, and Torneo Clausura 2009, having been an important contributor to Municipal's efforts.

Centurión became one of the few foreign players who have played in the two top soccer teams of Guatemala and have played El Clásico with both teams.

=== Return to Club Guaraní ===
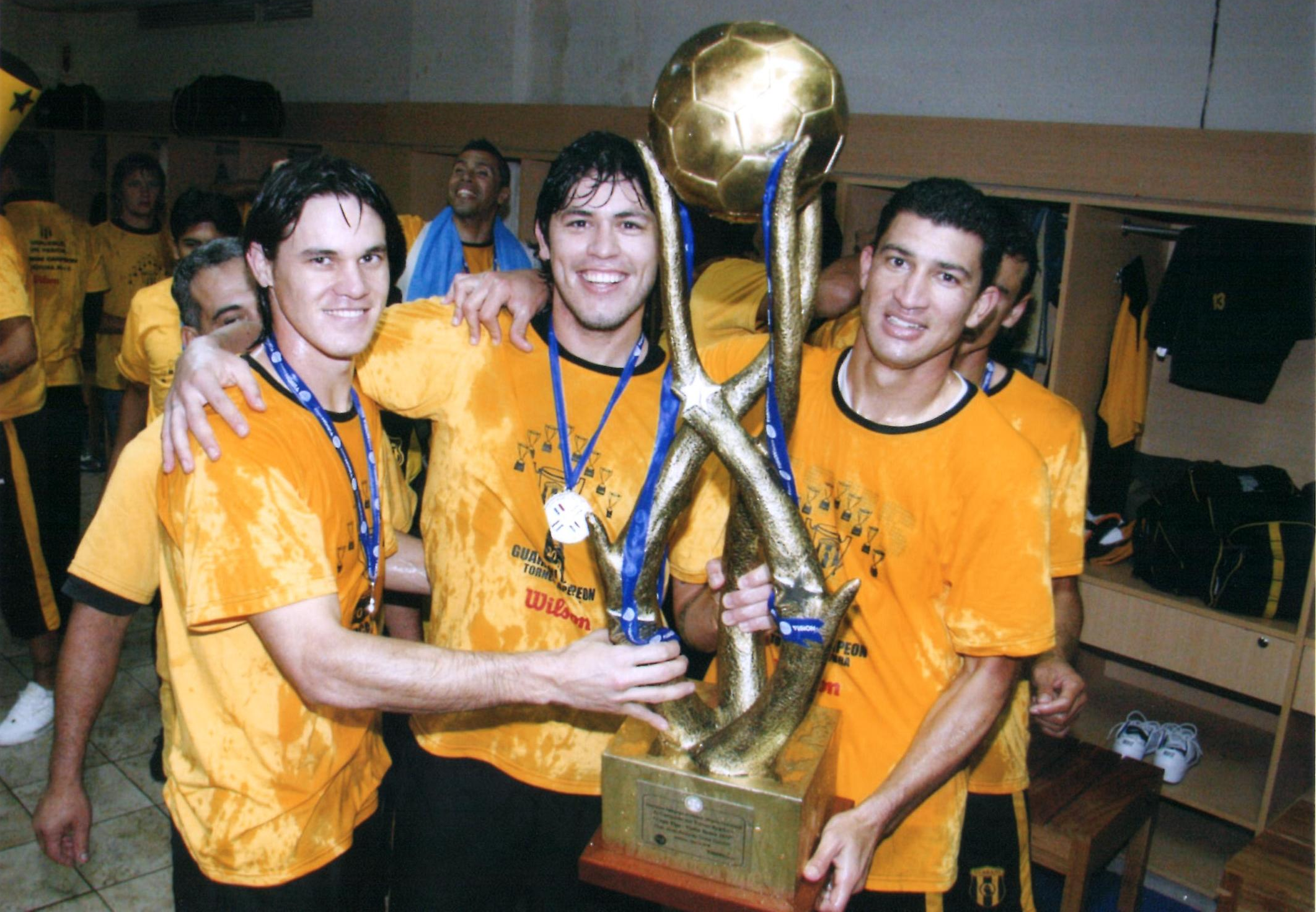
Celebration in the locker room between Joel Benítez and Eduardo Filippini with the 2010 league trophy

In July 2009 Centurión returned to Club Guarani. He participated in the Clausura 2009 Tournament, where the club qualified for the 2010 Copa Sudamericana with a third place regular season finish.

In the 2010 Torneo Apertura, Club Guaraní won the league, giving Centurión his first title win. This title qualified Guaraní for the 2011 Copa Libertadores. Centurión scored one goal with the club, in a 5–2 victory against Tacuary on 17 February 2010.

=== River Plate Puerto Rico ===
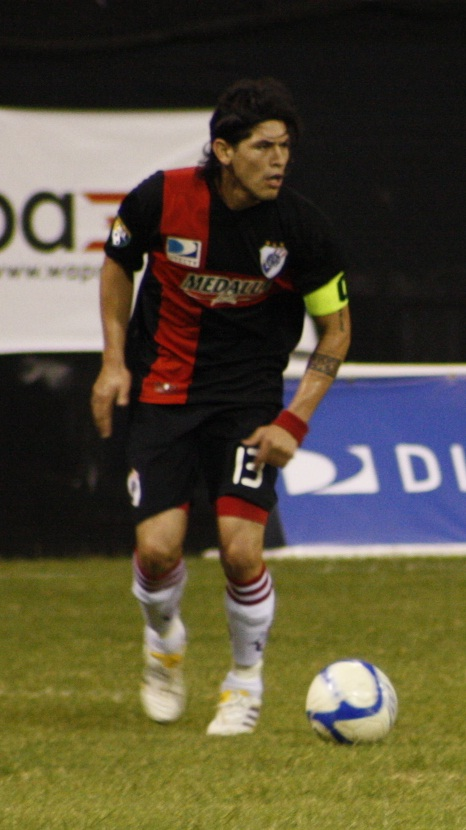
Centurión with the ball in the game against Guaynabo Fluminense at Estadio Juan Ramón Loubriel

In September 2010, Club Atlético River Plate Puerto Rico announced their acquisition of Centurión. He played in the 2010 PRSL Season, becoming one of the team's best players and being named team captain. The team went on to win the Puerto Rico Soccer League championship, with the first match of the final against Puerto Rico Islanders, a 1–0 victory, taking place on Centurión's birthday.

In 2011, he played in the CFU Club Championship and the PRSL.

=== Sarmiento de Resistencia ===
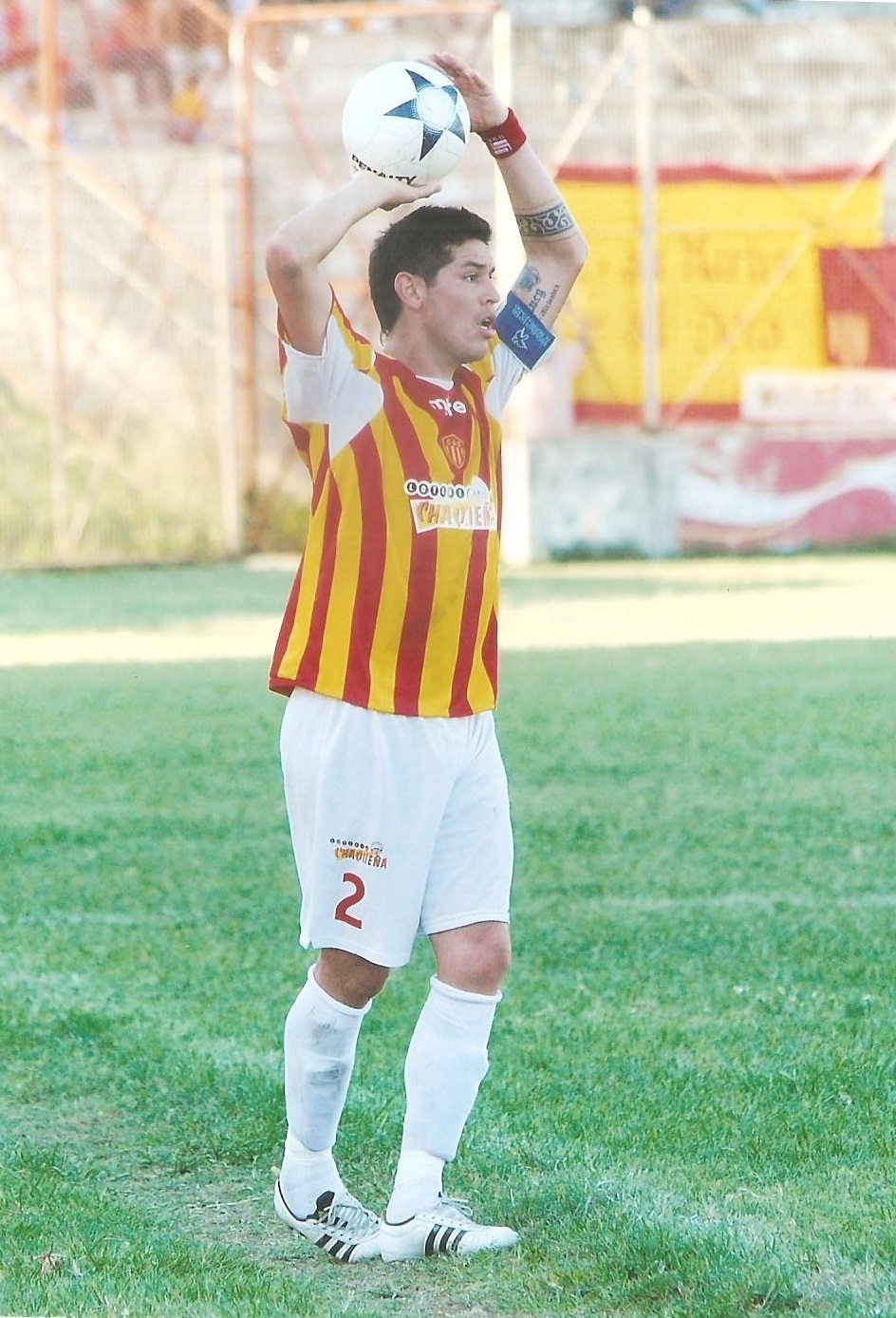
Centurion in action with Sarmiento during the match played against General San Martin

==== 2011–12 ====
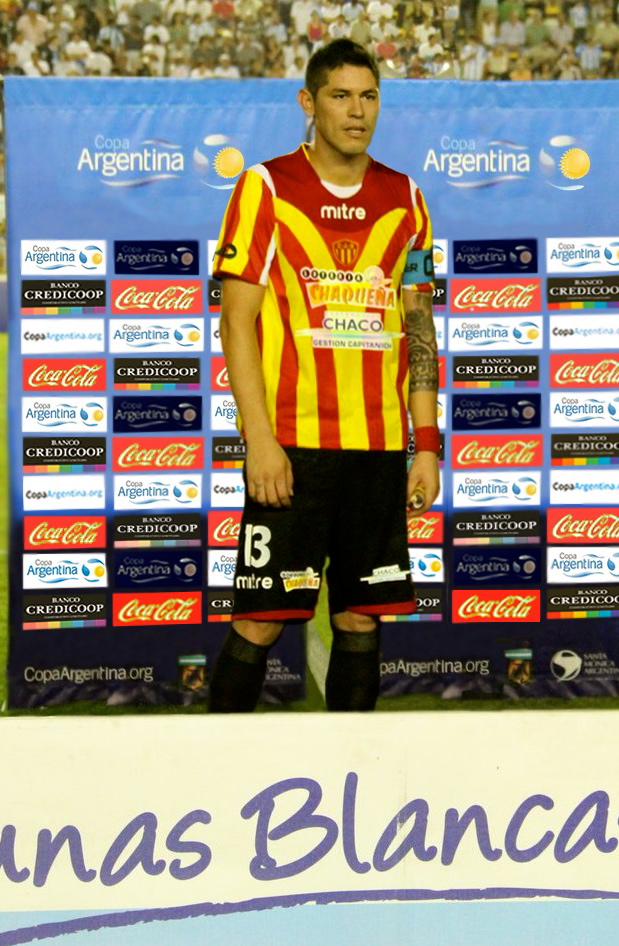
Centurion posing for photographers before the match between Sarmiento and Racing Avellaneda in the 2011–12 Copa Argentina r16

On 2 August 2011, Centurión was signed by Torneo Argentino B club Sarmiento de Resistencia. He made his official debut for the club on 6 September 2011 in the Second Round of the Copa Argentina against San Martin of Formosa, where Sarmiento won 4–3 by way of penalties (0–0 draw after 90 minutes). Centurión, along with his team, advanced to the round of 16 after beating higher-division teams like second division club Gimnasia y Esgrima de Jujuy in the round of 64, and 2011–12 Primera División champion Arsenal de Sarandi in the round of 32. In the round of 16, Sarmiento faced eventual cup-runner up Racing de Avellaneda; The club lost the match 2–0 and was eliminated from the tournament, although with the best performance from a Torneo Argentino B club.

On 11 September 2011, Centurión officially debuted in the Torneo Argentino B facing Guaraní Antonio Franco with a 1–0 loss. The club finished fourth of 7 in the group standings and barely missed out on qualifying to the next phase based on head-to-head record with third-placed team San Martin de Formosa.

==== 2012–13 ====
Unlike the previous tournament, Sarmiento came first out of 14 teams in the Group 4 standings and qualified to the next stage. However, in the next stage, Sarmiento finished last in a group made up of 4 teams and were eliminated. The player's last match with Sarmiento was in a 0–1 loss against General San Martin.

In the 2012–13 Copa Argentina, he played his first game against rivals Chaco For Ever, where Sarmiento won on penalties 4–3 (0–0 after 90 min.), moving on to the next stage to face Jorge Gibson Brown. The result was a 2–0 loss, which resulted in Sarmiento being eliminated.

After no agreement was made, Centurión decided to leave the club after the 2012–13 season in order to return to his hometown and keep playing the same category, giving priority to his family.

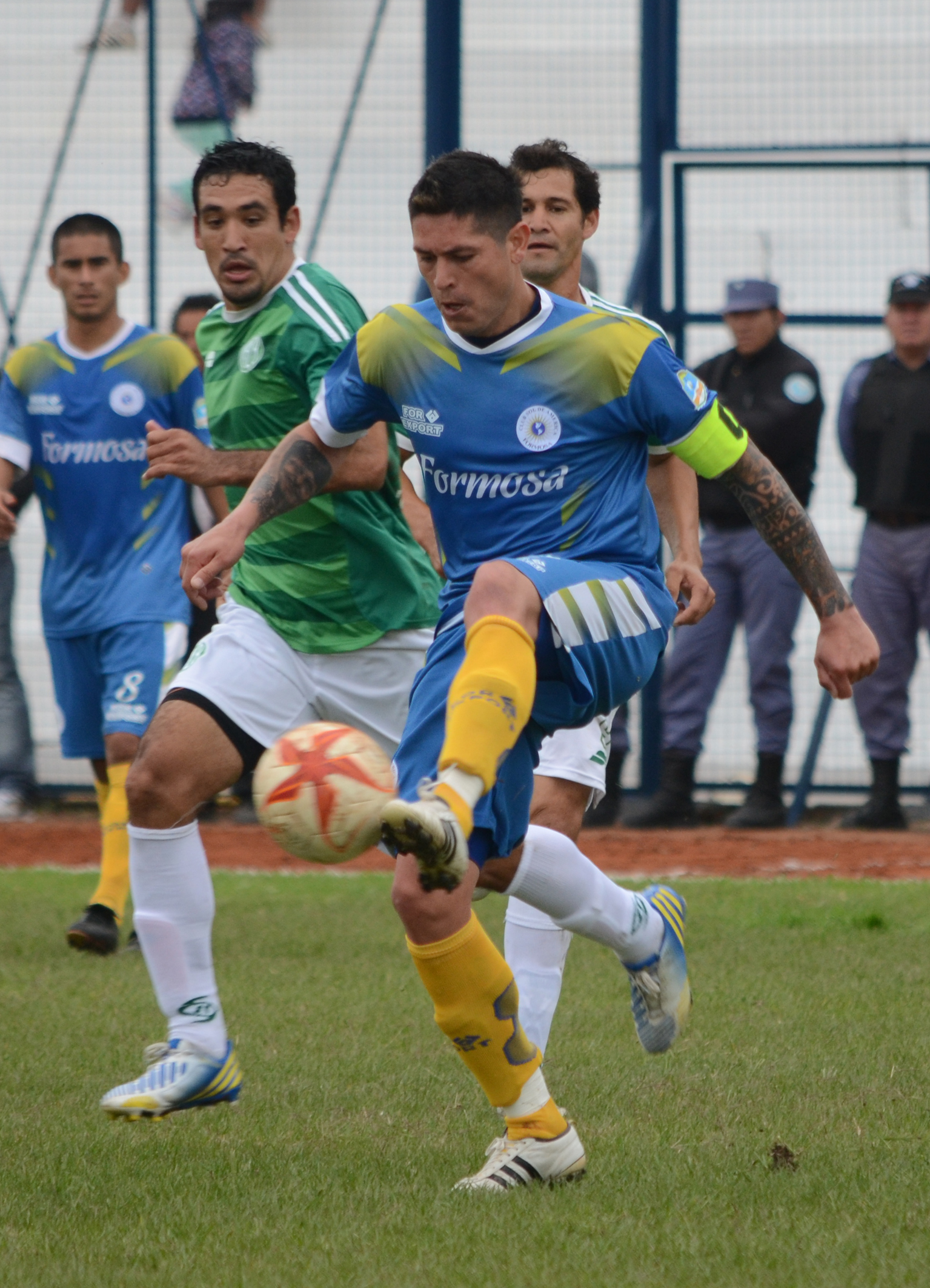
Centurión with Sol de América in a match against Atletico Laguna Blanca

=== Sol de América Formosa ===
After 11 years, Centurión returned to his native province and rejoined the club that saw him make his debut, Sol de América, for the 2013–14 Torneo Argentino B season.

He made his second debut with Sol de América on 22 September 2013 in Posadas, Misiones. Sol de América had a good performance in the aforementioned tournament, where they finished first in their zone and ended second in their group in the next phase. They were eliminated in the third phase by Union Aconquija.

At the end of the season, Centurión left the club. His last match with Sol de América was against Club Fontana de Resistencia on 10 November 2013; Centurión's team won 3–0.

=== Antigua Guatemala ===
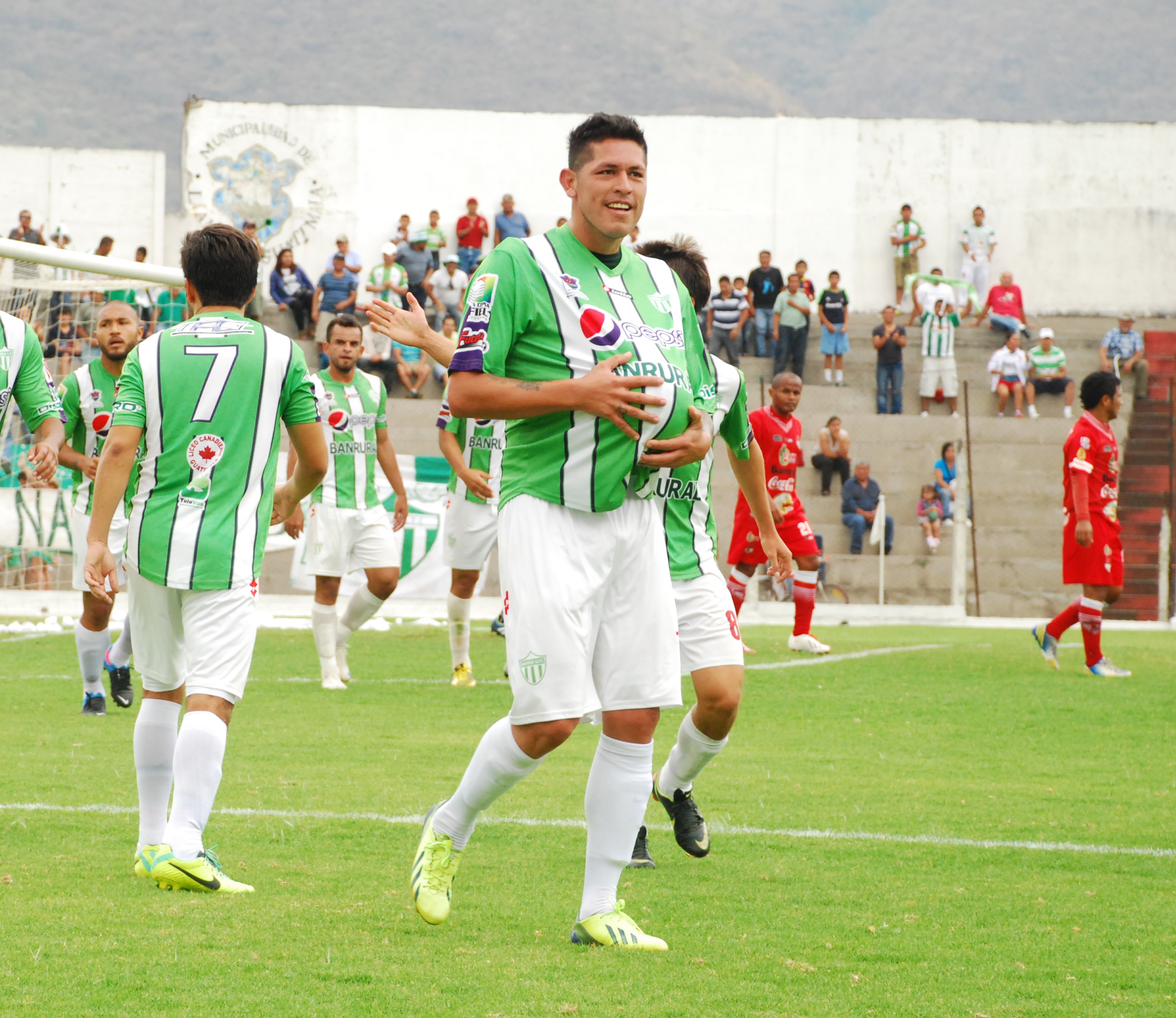
Centurion in Antigua celebrating his goal with dedications to his wife who was pregnant

After 4 ½ years, Centurion returns to Guatemalan football and joins Antigua GFC. He made his debut on 26 January 2014 in a 0–0 draw against Coban Imperial.

On 23 February Centurión scored his first goal with the shirt of Antigua against Sacachispas; the match finished in a bulky 6–1 victory in favor of Antigua, and Centurión scored the second goal of the match shortly before halftime. His last official game was on 4 May against Deportivo Carchá. After 6 months Centurión left the Antigueñan club.

=== Deportivo Coatepeque ===
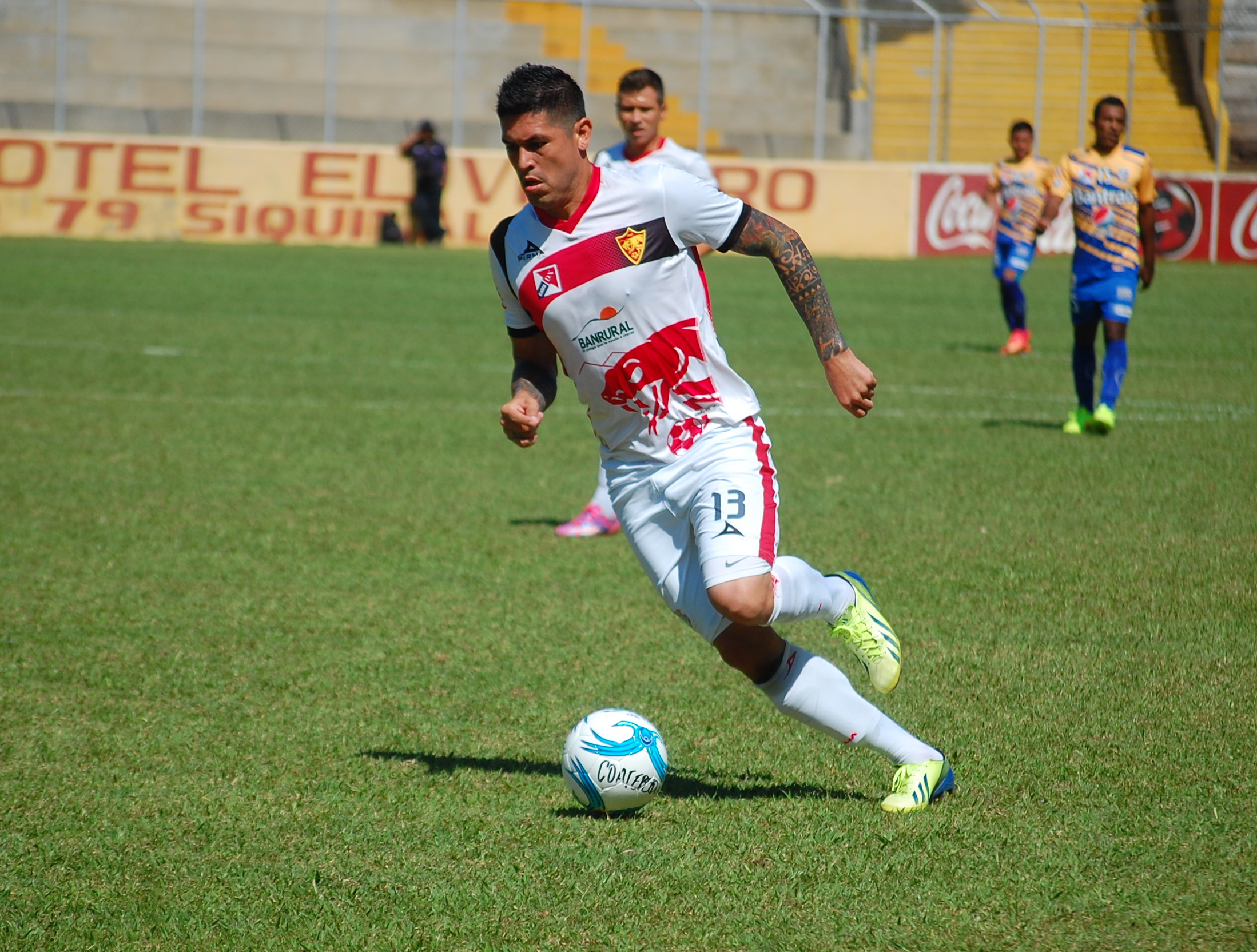
Centurion with the ball in a Coatepeque shirt against Suchitepéquez

Shortly after leaving Antigua, he joined another Guatemalan Club, Deportivo Coatepeque, in October 2014. He debuted in a 1–0 loss against Comunicaciones on 18 October 2014.

In the middle of the Apertura, he began to wear the captain's armband. Because of his good performances, he began to receive offers from other teams in Guatemala. However, he gave priority to Coatepeque since he was committed to helping the team avoid relegation. Results were improving with Centurión in the squad, but other teams weren't dropping points, and eventually the team was relegated. His last match for the club was against Comunicaciones on 18 April 2015, which ended in a 4–0 loss.

=== Universidad San Carlos ===
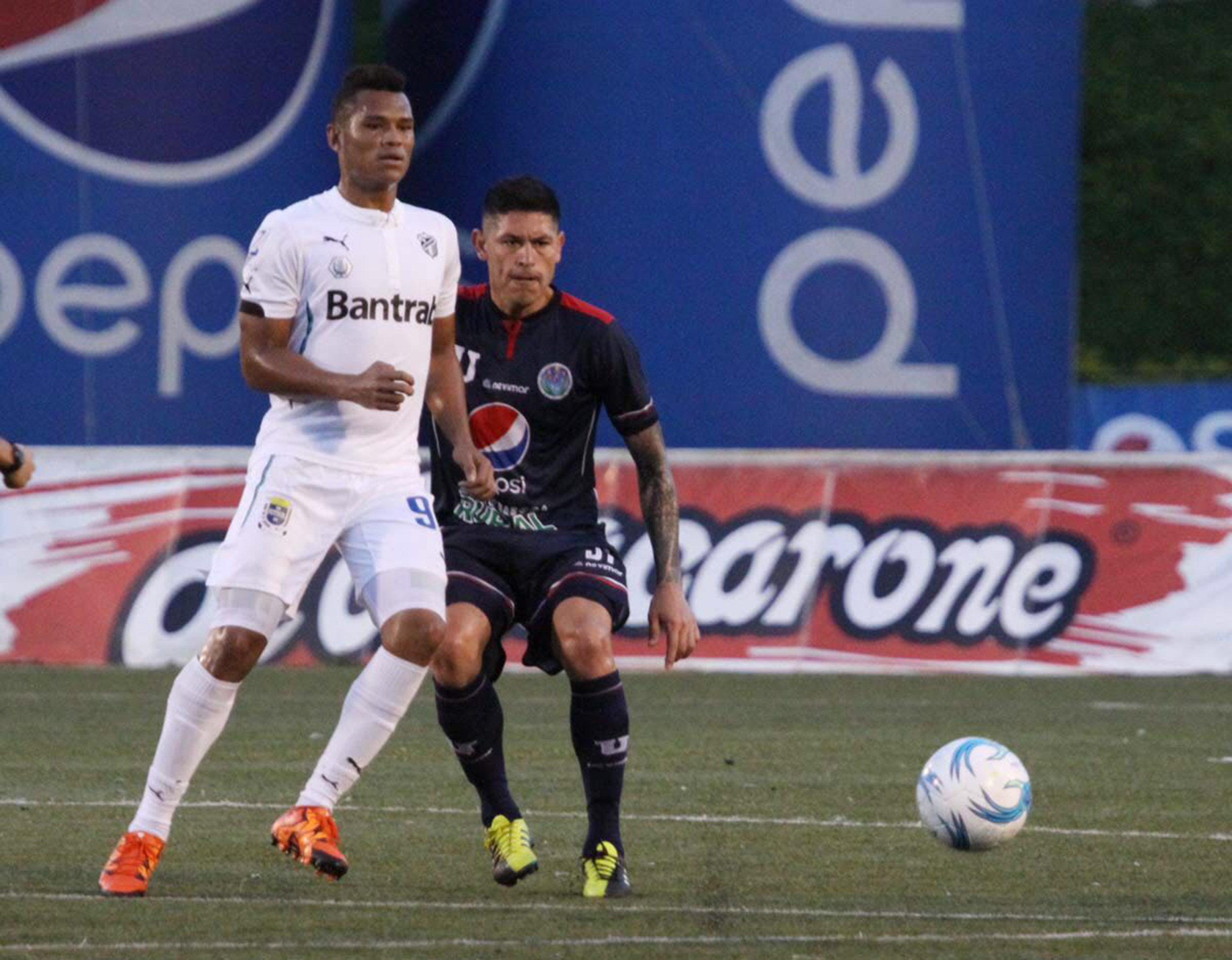
Centurión behind Panamanian striker Rolando Blackburn of Comunicaciones

With the 2015–16 season already underway, he receives an offer from Universidad San Carlos and signs a six-month contract for the club on 6 October 2015, which includes a six-month extension to play the 2016 Clausura. Four days later he officially makes his debut away to Cobán Imperial, being subbed in at the start of the second half of a 2–2 draw.

Centurion's last official match with the club was against his former team Antigua, which ended in a 1–0 loss. He left the club at the conclusion of the 2016 Clausura

=== Deportivo Escuintla Heredia ===
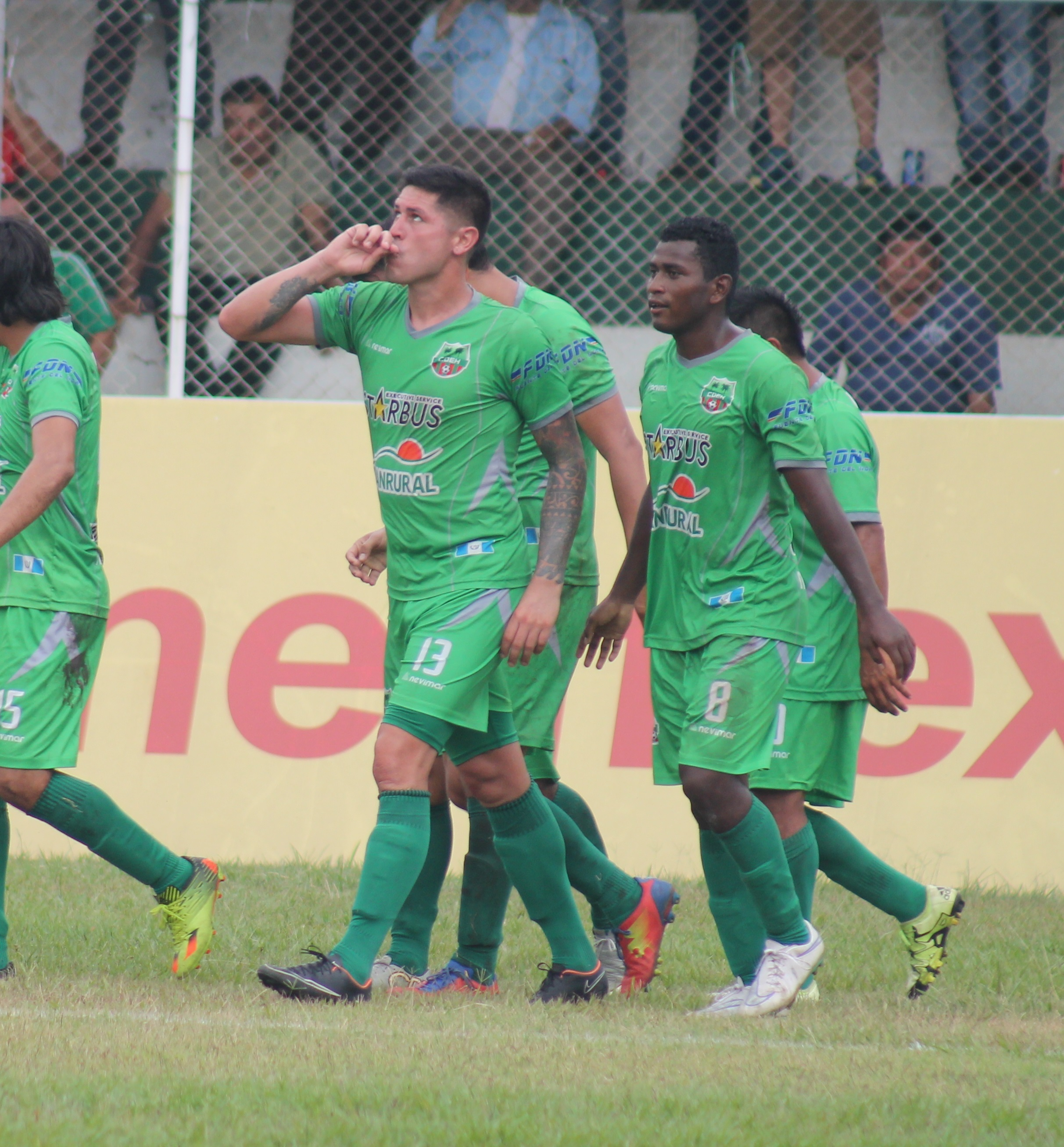
Paulo Centurión celebrating the winning goal against Santa Lucía Cotzumalguapa, his second goal wearing the colors of Escuintla Heredia

With the league tournament already underway, Centurión received an offer from Deportivo Escuintla Heredia in the Primera División de Ascenso (second tier). What persuaded Centurion to transfer to the club was the head coach; he was the same coach that introduced him to Guatemalan football a decade ago with Comunicaciones, and they developed an excellent friendship.

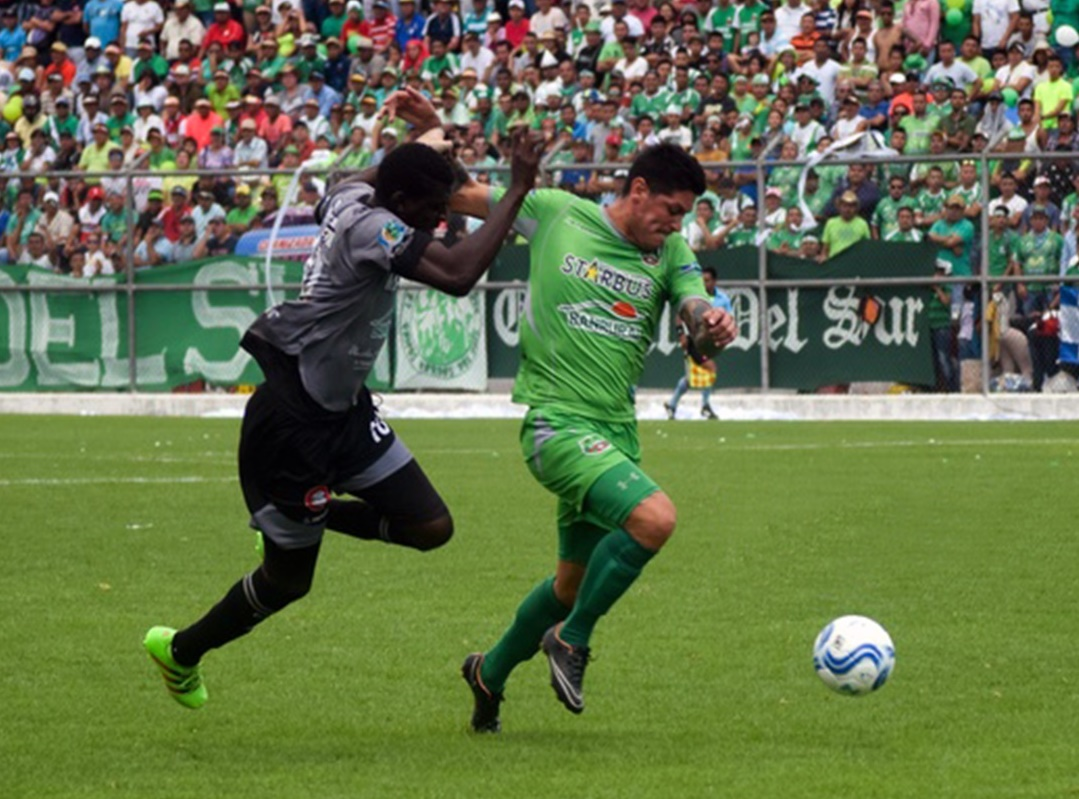
Paulo Centurión in the final against Deportivo Carchá

He debuted in a 1–0 win against Nueva Concepción. In his second game facing Deportivo Chiantla, Centurión scored his team's second goal in a 3–0 victory. In the penultimate matchday of the qualification phase; Escuintla Heredia faced Santa Lucia Cotzumalguapa and won 1–0 with a Centurión goal.

As champion of the 2015 Apertura, Escuintla Heredia qualified for the superfinal between the Apertura and Clausura champions, the Clausura champion being Deportivo Carcha. The superfinal was played on 22 May on neutral ground. The match ended 2–2 after extra time, and Escuintla lost the shootout 5–4. However, this did not eliminate all possibilities for promotion; they still had a second opportunity to achieve promotion by playing a relegation playoff against the last placed team in the Primera Division, which in this case was Deportivo Malacateco. The playoff would be played over two legs; the first leg was played on 28 May with Escuintla Heredia losing 2–1 at home. The second leg on 5 June at Estadio Santa Lucia ended in a 4–2 defeat, with the aggregate score being 6–3. The result meant that Malacateco remained in the top division, and Escuintla Heredia failed to achieve promotion.

After the conclusion of the 2015–2016 season, Centurion reached an agreement with the club board and extended his contract for one more year, to play the 2016–2017 Season. The Team began the 2016 Apertura with a 1–0 away victory to Santa Lucia Cotzumalguapa. They finish the regular phase obtaining qualification to the quarter-finals, where they were eliminated by Deportivo Mixco 5–4 on penalties after a 1–1 draw over two legs.

The objective for the 2017 Clausura was the same; to achieve promotion. In their first match of the season the club gets off to a good start with an away victory over Deportivo Iztapa. However the club had a poor season and failed to qualify for the next stage, and at the conclusion of the season Centurion left the club.

=== Return to Comunicaciones ===
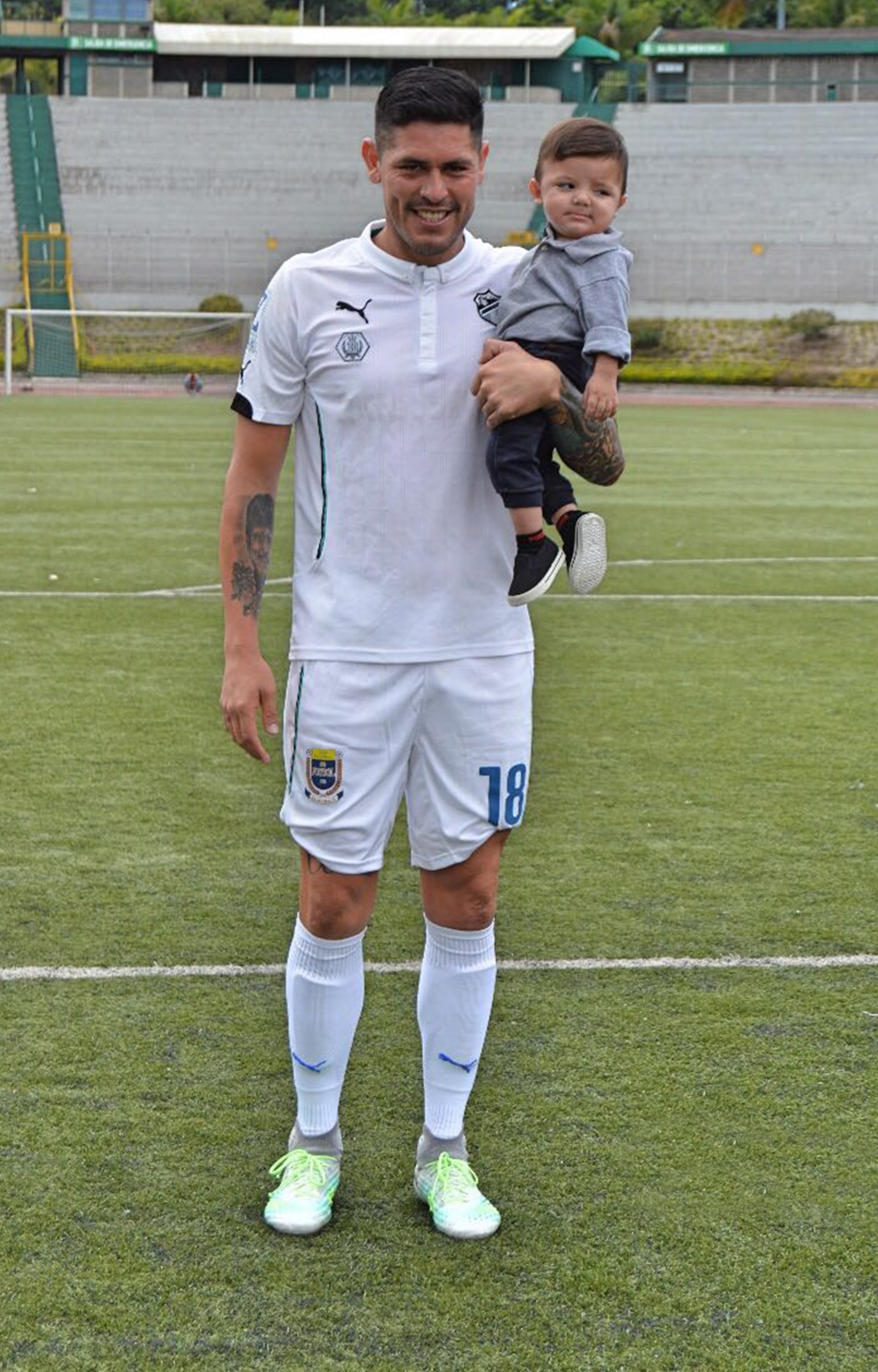
Centurión in Comunicaciones, posing with his son.

After 11 years, Centurión returned to Comunicaciones, club which he left after the 2006–07 season concluded. He was signed to a one-year contract. Shortly after being signed, he was sent to the club's second team, Comunicaciones B.

==== 2017 Clausura ====
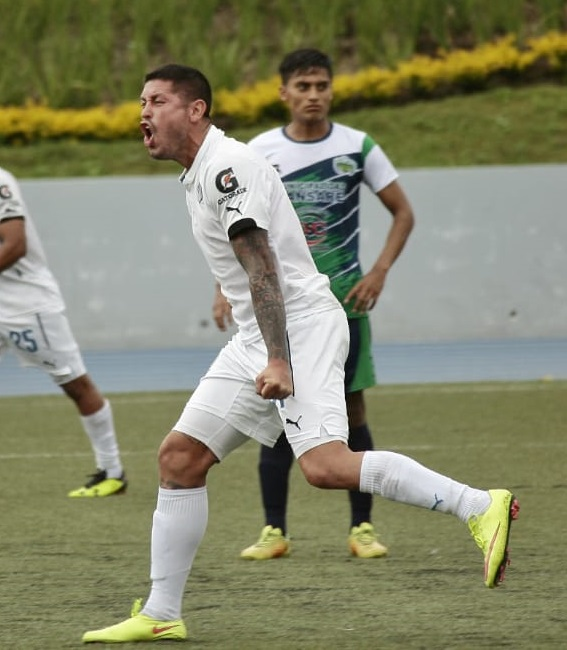
Centurión celebrating his first goal at Cremas B

Comunicaciones began the tournament in poor form, losing at home to Universidad SC 1–0. The team was not able to bounce out of this poor form, and Comunicaciones finished the Apertura tournament last in the league table. This put Comunicaciones in a crisis, because now they had to finish in the top three spots in the Clausura table to avoid relegation.

The team managed to improve the situation in the Clausura Tournament, where they eventually managed to finish in first place, securing their permanence in the top category and achieving qualification for the playoffs with one matchday left. In the quarterfinals they faced Santa Lucía Cotzumalguapa; with the scores at 3–3 on aggregate after two legs, Comunicaciones B qualified to the semifinal on away goals. After the victory a curious topic was brought up; the possibility of Comunicaciones B and its senior team in the top division, something rare in the sport. Through the league's format, Comunicaciones won the right to play a two legged playoff for direct promotion, and for this Deportivo Chiantla would be their opponent. Comunicaciones B lost 4–1 on aggregate and were eliminated in the semi-finals.

==== 2018 Apertura ====
For the next season, the club renewed Centurión's contract for one more year. Centurion played in the club's league debut, a 0–0 draw at home to Carchá.

Centurión scored his first goal for the club against Deportivo Sansare, opening the scoring in a match that ended 2–0. Everything was going well, and he scored again in the next game, a bulk 5–1 victory away to Universidad. The club qualified to the playoffs by finishing fourth in the league table. In the quarterfinals they faced Santa Lucia, where they were eliminated, 4–2 on aggregate.

== Honors ==
Club Guaraní

- Paraguayan Primera División: Apertura 2010

Club Atlético River Plate Puerto Rico

- Puerto Rico Soccer League: 2010
