= 2006–07 in Guatemalan football =

== Liga Nacional de Fútbol de Guatemala ==
=== 2006–07 teams ===
- Comunicaciones
- Heredia
- Jalapa
- Marquense
- Mictlán
- Municipal
- Petapa
- Suchitepéquez
- Xelajú
- Zacapa

=== Apertura ===
==== Standings ====
Pos	Team	Pld	W	D	L	GF	GA	GD	Pts	Qualification
1	Comunicaciones	18	12	4	2	31	13	+18	40	Qualification for Semifinals
2	Xelajú	18	10	2	6	35	16	+19	32	Qualification for Semifinals
3	Municipal	18	8	5	5	30	22	+8	29	Qualification for Quarterfinals
4	Jalapa	18	8	3	7	26	23	+3	27	Qualification for Quarterfinals
5	Marquense	18	7	4	7	26	20	+6	25	Qualification for Quarterfinals
6	Zacapa	18	7	3	8	20	32	−12	24	Qualification for Quarterfinals
7	Petapa	18	6	5	7	31	30	+1	23	
8	Heredia	18	5	4	9	24	36	−12	19	
9	Suchitepéquez	18	5	3	10	17	29	−12	18	
10	Mictlán	18	3	5	10	12	31	−19	14	

==== Quarterfinals ====
29 November 2006

Zacapa	0–1	Municipal

Zacapa
30 November 2006

Marquense	3–2	Jalapa

San Marcos

3 December 2006

Municipal	2–0	Zacapa

Guatemala City
3 December 2006

Jalapa	2–0	Marquense

Jalapa
- Municipal advances 3-0 on aggregate
- Jalapa advances 4-3 on aggregate

==== Semifinals ====
6 December 2006

Municipal	3–0	Xelajú

Guatemala City
7 December 2006

Jalapa	1–2	Comunicaciones

Jalapa

9 December 2006

Xelajú	1–0	Municipal

Quetzaltenango
10 December 2006

Comunicaciones	3–1	Jalapa

Guatemala City
- Municipal advances 3-1 on aggregate.
- Comunicaciones advances 5-2 on aggregate.

==== Finals ====
14 December 2006

Municipal	0–0	Comunicaciones

Guatemala City

17 December 2006

Comunicaciones	1–1	Municipal

Guatemala City
- Municipal 2006–07 Apertura champions on away goals.

=== Clausura ===
==== Standings ====
Pos	Team	Pld	W	D	L	GF	GA	GD	Pts	Qualification
1	Municipal	18	9	5	4	43	21	+22	32	Qualification for Semifinals
2	Petapa	18	9	4	5	31	23	+8	31	Qualification for Semifinals
3	Marquense	18	8	5	5	35	26	+9	29	Qualification for Quarterfinals
4	Xelajú	18	7	5	6	24	20	+4	26	Qualification for Quarterfinals
5	Heredia	18	7	4	7	26	28	−2	25	Qualification for Quarterfinals
6	Suchitepéquez	18	6	5	7	21	25	−4	23	Qualification for Quarterfinals
7	Zacapa	18	5	6	7	25	35	−10	21	
8	Comunicaciones	18	4	8	6	17	21	−4	20	
9	Jalapa	18	5	5	8	19	27	−8	20	
10	Mictlán	18	3	7	8	21	36	−15	16	

==== Quarterfinals ====
9 May 2007

Heredia	2–1	Xelajú

San José
9 May 2007

Suchitepéquez	2–1	Marquense

Mazatenango

12 May 2007

Marquense	1–0	Suchitepéquez

San Marcos
13 May 2007

Xelajú	3–0	Heredia

Quetzaltenango
- Marquense 2-2 Suchitepéquez on aggregate, Marquense advanced on better regular season finish.
- Xelajú advances 4-2 on aggregate.

==== Semifinals ====
16 May 2007

Marquense	3–0	Petapa

San Marcos
17 May 2007

Xelajú	3–1	Municipal

Quetzaltenango

20 May 2007

Petapa	0–0	Marquense

San Miguel Petapa
20 May 2007

Municipal	1–1	Xelajú

Guatemala City
- Marquense advances 3-0 on aggregate.
- Xelajú advances 4-2 on aggregate.

==== Finals ====
24 May 2007

Xelajú	0–1	Marquense

Quetzaltenango

26 May 2007

Marquense	1–4	Xelajú

San Marcos
- Xelajú 2006–07 Clausura champions 4-2 on aggregate.

=== Relegation ===
==== Aggregate table ====
Pos	Team	Pld	W	D	L	GF	GA	GD	Pts	Qualification or relegation
1	Municipal	36	17	10	9	73	43	+30	61	
2	Comunicaciones	36	16	12	8	48	34	+14	60	
3	Xelajú	36	17	7	12	59	36	+23	58	
4	Marquense	36	15	9	12	61	46	+15	54	
5	Petapa	36	15	9	12	62	53	+9	54	
6	Jalapa	36	13	8	15	45	50	−5	47	
7	Zacapa	36	13	8	15	45	50	−5	47	
8	Heredia (O)	36	12	8	16	50	64	−14	44	Relegation to Relegation playoff
9	Suchitepéquez (O)	36	11	8	17	38	54	−16	41	Relegation to Relegation playoff
10	Mictlán (R)	36	6	12	18	33	67	−34	30	Relegation to Second division

(O) Play-off winners; (R) Relegated
- Mictlán automatically relegated to second division.
- Heredia and Suchitepéquez to promotion/relegation playoff.

==== Promotion/Relegation Playoffs ====
6 June 2007

Cobán Imperial	1–0	Suchitepéquez

Cobán
10 June 2007

Suchitepéquez	2–0	Cobán Imperial

Mazatenango
- Suchitepequez remains in top division, winning 2-1 on aggregate. Coban Imperial stays in second division.

6 June 2007

Sacachispas	1–1	Heredia

Chiquimula
10 June 2007

Heredia	1–0	Sacachispas

San José
- Heredia remains in top division, winning 2-1 on aggregate. Sacachispas stays in second division.
