= Cristino Centurión =

Paraguayan footballer (1954–2026)

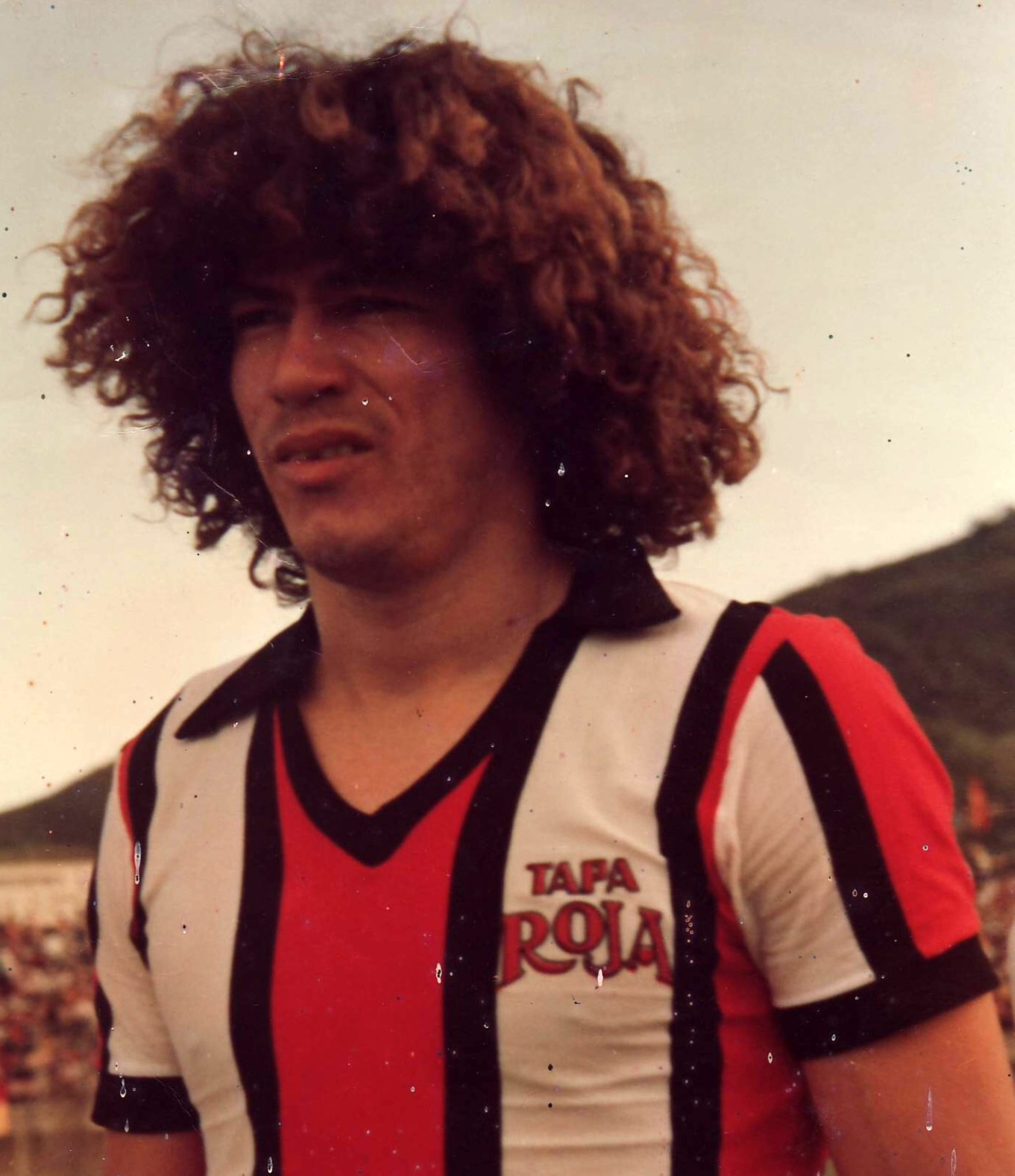
- Centurión for Deportes Tolima

Personal information
- Date of birth: 24 July 1954
- Place of birth: Formosa, Formosa Province, Argentina
- Date of death: 29 July 2026 (aged 72)
- Height: 1.80 m (5 ft 11 in)
- Position: Midfielder

Senior career*
Years	Team	Apps	(Gls)
1969–1976	Club Atlético 1.º de Mayo		
1976	Sportivo Patria		
1976–1981	Club Guaraní		
1981–1983	Deportes Tolima		
1983–1984	Deportivo Cali		
1985–1986	Club Sol de América		
1986	Club Olimpia		
1988–1992	Club Atlético 1.º de Mayo		
1993	Club Sportivo General San Martín		

International career
1985–1986	Paraguay	8	(0)
- * Club domestic league appearances and goals

Cristino Centurión (24 July 1954 – 29 July 2026) was a professional footballer who played as a midfielder. Born in Argentina, he was a Paraguay international.

== Early life ==
Cristino Centurión was born in Formosa, Argentina on 24 July 1954.

== Career ==
Centurión started his career with Argentine side Club Atlético 1.º de Mayo. In 1976, he signed for Argentine side Sportivo Patria. After that, he signed for Paraguayan side Club Guaraní. In 1981, he signed for Colombian side Deportes Tolima. He was regarded as one of the club's most important players. In 1983, he signed for Colombian side Deportivo Cali. In 1985, he signed for Paraguayan side Club Sol de América. In 1986, he signed for Paraguayan side Club Olimpia. In 1988, he returned to Argentine side Club Atlético 1.º de Mayo. In 1993, he signed for Argentine side Club Sportivo General San Martín.

== Personal life and death ==
Centurión was nicknamed "Kitty". He died on 29 July 2026, at the age of 72.

He was the father of Argentine footballer Paulo Centurión.
