= Estadio Marquesa de la Ensenada =

Stadium in San Marcos, Guatemala

Coordinates: 14°58′01″N 91°47′30″W

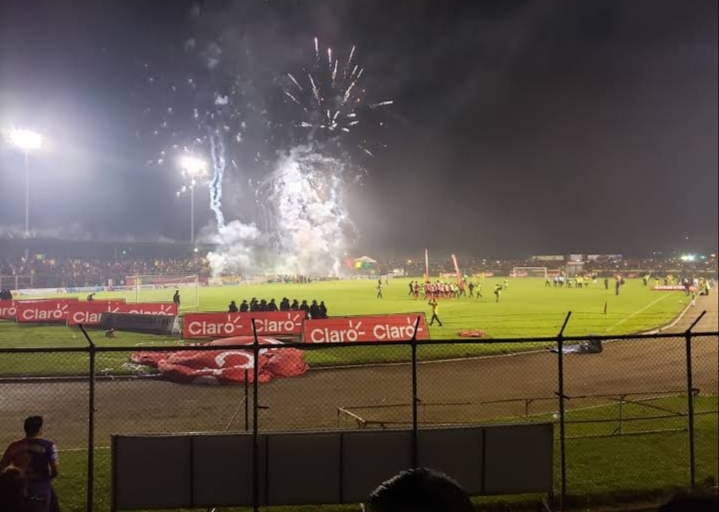
- Interactive map of Estadio Marquesa de la Ensenada
- Location: San Marcos, Guatemala
- Owner: Municipality of San Marcos
- Capacity: 11,000
- Surface: Grass
- Field size: 104 m × 68 m (341 ft × 223 ft)

Construction
- Opened: 23 April 1963; 63 years ago
- Renovated: 2025

Tenants
- C.D. Marquense (1963–present); Guatemala national football team (selected matches)

Estadio Marquesa de la Ensenada is a football stadium in San Marcos, Guatemala. It is home to Liga Nacional club Marquense and has an 11,000-seat capacity.

== History ==
Opened on 22 April 1963, it was named after the nobiliary title of Maria Barrios Aparicio, Marquesa viuda de la Ensenada, a native of San Lorenzo, San Marcos, who donated the land and funds for construction of the stadium and other projects. The stadium's construction cost was Q 186,000.

On 15 May 1988 the stadium hosted a World Cup qualification match, in which Guatemala drew 1-1 against Cuba in the second leg of a home-and-away elimination series in front of 18,000 people. It was the first time that the Guatemala national team played an official match in San Marcos.

The second leg of the final of the 2007 Clausura tournament was played between the local team Marquense and Xelajú MC, with the visiting team winning 4-1 and 4-2 on aggregate.

== Description ==
The football pitch is surrounded by a designated area for an athletic track. The structure is primarily built of concrete, and its main two sections, palco and tribuna, have numbered seats installed. Artificial lighting for evening events is available.

== See also ==
- Lists of stadiums
