= 2019–20 East Bengal FC season =

Indian football club season

East Bengal
2019–20 season
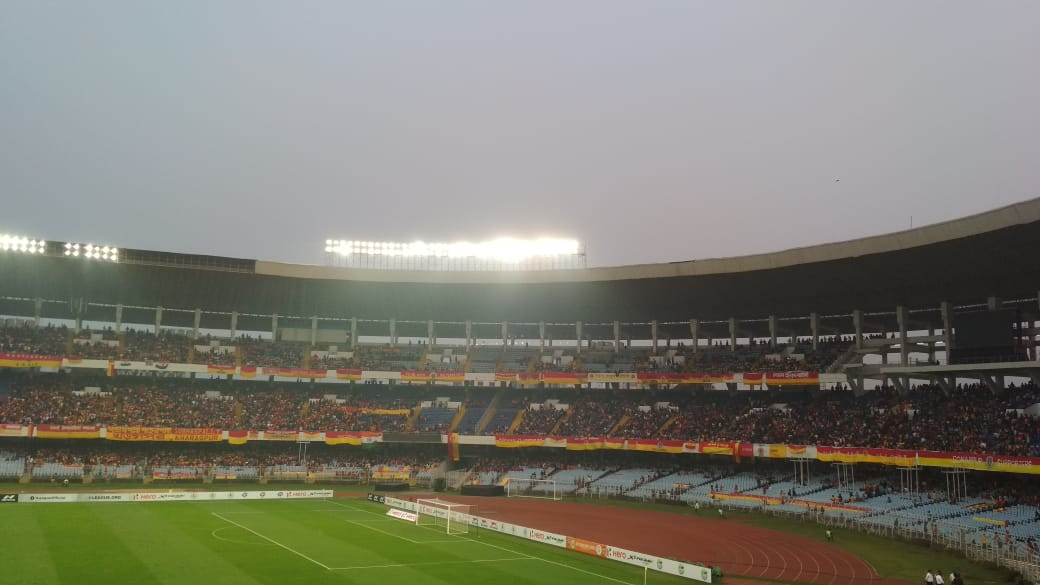
- East Bengal crowd at the Salt Lake Stadium in the Kolkata Derby.
- Owner: Quess East Bengal Pvt. Ltd.
- Chairman: Ajit Issac
- Manager: (Spain) Alejandro Menéndez (until 21 January 2020) (Spain) Mario Rivera (from 23 January 2020)
- Stadium: Kalyani Stadium; Salt Lake Stadium; East Bengal Ground
- I-League: 2nd (Note: The 2019–20 I-League was cancelled after 16 Rounds due to the COVID-19 pandemic. East Bengal FC was at the second place when the league was cancelled.)
- Calcutta League: 3rd
- Durand Cup: Semi-Finals
- Top goalscorer: League: Marcos de la Espada; Jaime Santos Colado (6 each); All: Jaime Santos Colado (16)
- Highest home attendance: 23,498 (vs. George Telegraph)
- Lowest home attendance: 4,573 (vs. Punjab F.C.)
- Average home league attendance: 30,000 (I-League); 14,196 (CFL)
- Biggest win: East Bengal FC 6–0 Jamshedpur FC (2019 Durand Cup)
Home colours	Away colours

The 2019–20 season was the club's 100th season in existence. East Bengal FC formed in 1920, played its centenary season, competing in the I-League, Durand Cup and Calcutta Football League.

== Preseason overview ==
East Bengal FC already announced the extension of the contract for 2 more years of their coach Alejandro Menéndez before the last game of the season. They also announced the extension of the contract of their Physical trainer and assistant coach Carlos Nodar Paz for 2 more years.

East Bengal FC made the announcement of retaining core players of the 2018–19 I-League campaign for the next season starting with Brandon Vanlalremdika, Lalrindika Ralte, Borja Gomez and Samad Ali Mallick. East Bengal FC also announced the signing of Naorem Tondomba Singh from NEROCA F.C. for a 4 years deal and Boithang Haokip from 2018–19 Indian Super League champions Bengaluru F.C. on a 3-year deal.

On 6 June, East Bengal FC announced the double signing of Pintu Mahato and Abhishek Ambekar from their arch-rivals Mohun Bagan on a 3 years and 2 years deal respectively. The duo would strengthen the squad for the upcoming season. East Bengal FC also announced the contract extension of star central defensive midfielder Kassim Aidara for another season, after a stellar performance in the I-League last season gaining coach Alejandro Menéndez's trust.

On 8 June, controversy related to Jobby Justin newly emerged after the transfer saga to ATK was questionable and the AIFF passed the incident to the IFA disciplinary committee for their decision. The IFA after reviewing the documents announced that Jobby Justin has to play for East Bengal FC for the upcoming season to AIFF and now it is up to the AIFF to decide on the final fate of the last year's top scorer for East Bengal FC. However, the AIFF Players' status committee announced that Jobby Justin is free to play for ATK.

On 12 June, East Bengal FC announced the contract extension of attacking midfield Jaime Santos Colado for 2 more years. The 24-year-old Spanish attacker scored 5 goals including a goal in the Kolkata Derby last season. On 13 June, East Bengal FC announced that UEFA pro-licensed former FC Barcelona Escola Technical Director Josep Ferré, popularly known as Coco, has joined as the Assistant Coach for the team until 2021. The very next day, East Bengal FC announced that former I-League winner with Bengaluru F.C., Goal-keeper Lalthuammawia Ralte has joined in the ranks on loan till the end of the season from ISL side FC Goa.

On 26 June, East Bengal FC announced that assistant coach Bastob Roy will continue for the 2019–20 season and will also be the head of Youth Development. East Bengal FC also announced that Abhra Mondal would continue as the goalkeeper coach for the 2019–20 season. On 3 July, East Bengal FC announced the signing of their 4th foreigner, Marti Crespi who played for Delhi Dynamos F.C. in the 2018–19 Indian Super League season. East Bengal FC also called in two young promising players, who recently impressed in the 2018–19 Goa Professional League, 23-year-old Salgaocar F.C. forward Ronaldo Oliveira, who became the top scorer with 23 goals and SESA FA defender Anil Chavan, to join the trails and if they can impress coach Alejandro Menéndez, they will be signed.

On 14 July, East Bengal FC announced that promising defender Asheer Akhtar will join in for trials from Bengaluru FC. He was adjudged the "Upcoming Player of the season" by Bengaluru FC in 2017–18. On 20 July, East Bengal FC announced the signing of Abhijit Sarkar on a season-long loan from ISL side Chennaiyin FC. Abhijit represented India in the 2017 FIFA U-17 World Cup, and also played for Indian Arrows in the 2018–19 I-League.

On 4 August, East Bengal FC confirmed that Goanese forward Ronaldo Oliveira has signed for the club on a 3 years contract after impressing the coaching staff in the trials.

On 6 August, East Bengal FC announced the singing of their 5th foreigner Marcos Jiménez from CD Atlético Baleares, who plays as a forward.

On 23 August, East Bengal FC completed their quota of foreigners as they announced the signing of Juan Mera Gonzalez from SD Leioa, who can play as a left-winger as well as attacking midfielder.

== Transfers ==
=== Incoming ===
No.	Pos.	Name	Previous Team	Month
14	MF	(India) Naorem Tondomba Singh	NEROCA F.C.	May
9	MF	(India) Boithang Haokip	Bengaluru F.C.	June
11	MF	(India) Pintu Mahato	Mohun Bagan	June
27	DF	(India) Abhishek Ambekar	Mohun Bagan	June
1	GK	(India) Lalthuammawia Ralte	FC Goa (loan)	June
21	DF	(Spain) Martí Crespí	Delhi Dynamos F.C.	July
19	FW	(India) Ronaldo Oliveira	Salgaocar F.C.	July
2	DF	(India) Asheer Akhtar	Bengaluru FC	July
7	DF	(India) Abhijit Sarkar	Chennaiyin FC (loan)	July
18	FW	(Spain) Marcos de la Espada	CD Atlético Baleares	August
23	FW	(Spain) Juan Mera González	SD Leioa	August
15	DF	(India) Abhash Thapa	Hyderabad FC (loan)	January
17	FW	(India) Edmund Lalrindika	Bengaluru FC (loan)	January
22	FW	(Liberia) Ansumana Kromah	Peerless	January
28	DF	(India) Monotosh Chakladar	Pathachakra (loan)	January
24	MF	(Spain) Víctor Pérez Alonso	FK Žalgiris	February
6	DF	(India) Gurwinder Singh	—	February
4	DF	(Costa Rica) Jhonny Acosta	UCR	March

=== Outgoing ===
No.	Pos.	Name	Team	Remarks
2	DF	(Costa Rica) Jhonny Acosta	UCR	End of Contract
4	DF	(India) Kingshuk Debnath	Bhawanipore F.C.	End of Contract
24	DF	(India) Salam Ranjan Singh	ATK	End of Contract
28	DF	(India) Koushik Sarkar	Mohun Bagan	End of Contract
7	MF	(India) Surabuddin Mollick	Mohun Bagan	End of Contract
10	MF	(Spain) Antonio Rodríguez Dovale	Nea Salamania FC	End of Loan
15	MF	(India) Siam Hanghal	Delhi Dynamos F.C.	End of Loan
9	FW	(Mexico) Enrique Esqueda	—	End of Contract
22	FW	(India) Jobby Justin	ATK	End of Contract
11	FW	(India) Bali Gagandeep	Minerva Punjab F.C.	Released
1	GK	(India) Ubaid CK	Gokulam Kerala F.C.	Released
27	DF	(India) Lalramchullova	Mohun Bagan	End of Contract
17	MF	(India) Laldanmawia Ralte	Hyderabad FC	End of Contract
—	DF	(India) Hira Monda	Mohammedan	End of Contract
3	DF	(Spain) Borja Gómez Pérez	—	Released
19	FW	(India) Ronaldo Oliveira	Kerala Blasters FC B	Released
46	FW	(India) Subhonil Ghosh	Garhwal F.C.	Released
21	DF	(Spain) Martí Crespí	—	Released
22	FW	(Liberia) Ansumana Kromah	—	Released

=== New contracts ===
Date	Pos.	No	Player	Ref.
4 April 2019	MF	30	(India) Brandon Vanlalremdika	
13 April 2019	DF	3	(Spain) Borja Gomez Perez	
17 April 2019	MF	20	(India) Lalrindika Ralte	
20 April 2019	DF	25	(India) Samad Ali Mallick	
6 June 2019	MF	16	(Senegal) Kassim Aidara	
12 June 2019	MF	8	(Spain) Jaime Santos Colado	
28 June 2019	DF	41	(India) Manoj Mohammed	
28 June 2019	MF	38	(India) Prakash Sarkar	
28 June 2019	FW	43	(India) PC Rohlupuia	

=== Promoted from academy ===
No.	Pos.	Name
46	MF	(India) Subhonil Ghosh

== Team ==
=== First-team squad ===
No.	Name	Nationality	Position	Date of birth (Age)
Goalkeepers
1	Lalthuammawia Ralte	(India)	GK	28 November 1992 (age 33)
32	Mirshad Michu	(India)	GK	3 February 1994 (age 32)
40	Rakshit Dagar	(India)	GK	16 October 1992 (age 34)
Defenders
2	Asheer Akhtar	(India)	CB/RB	14 December 1994 (age 31)
4	Jhonny Acosta	(Costa Rica)	CB	21 July 1983 (age 43)
5	Kamalpreet Singh	(India)	RB	15 November 1997 (age 28)
6	Gurwinder Singh	(India)	CB	16 April 1986 (age 40)
15	Abhash Thapa	(India)	LB	19 December 1998 (age 27)
25	Samad Ali Mallick	(India)	RB	30 September 1994 (age 32)
27	Abhishek Ambekar	(India)	LB	11 August 1991 (age 35)
28	Monotosh Chakladar	(India)	CB/LB	8 April 1998 (age 28)
29	Mehtab Singh	(India)	CB/RB	5 June 1998 (age 28)
41	Manoj Mohammed	(India)	LB	8 January 1999 (age 27)
Midfielders
7	Abhijit Sarkar	(India)	CAM/RW	5 January 2000 (age 26)
8	Jaime Santos Colado	(Spain)	RW/LW	27 April 1995 (age 31)
9	Boithang Haokip	(India)	CAM/LW/RW	9 March 1991 (age 35)
11	Pintu Mahato	(India)	LW/RW	3 July 1997 (age 29)
14	Naorem Tondomba Singh	(India)	CM	1 February 1999 (age 27)
16	Kassim Aidara	(France)	CDM	12 May 1987 (age 39)
20	Lalrindika Ralte	(India)	CM	7 September 1992 (age 34)
23	Juan Mera González	(Spain)	LW/CAM	22 November 1993 (age 32)
24	Víctor Pérez Alonso	(Spain)	CDM	12 January 1988 (age 38)
30	Brandon Vanlalremdika	(India)	LW	28 January 1994 (age 32)
38	Prakash Sarkar	(India)	CDM/RB	15 February 1997 (age 29)
43	PC Rohlupuia	(India)	CAM	16 January 1999 (age 27)
Forwards
17	Edmund Lalrindika	(India)	LW/RW	24 April 1999 (age 27)
18	Marcos de la Espada	(Spain)	FW	3 November 1985 (age 41)
26	Bidyashagar Singh	(India)	FW	11 March 1998 (age 28)

Last updated: 06 March 2020
Source: East Bengal First Team

=== Technical staff ===
Position	Name
Manager (Head Coach)	(Spain) Mario Rivera Campesino
Assistant coach	(Spain) Marçal Trulls Sevillano
Physical Trainer	(Spain) Carlos Nodar Paz
Assistant coach	(India) Bastob Roy
Goalkeeping coach	(India) Abhra Mondal
Assistant Physical Trainer	(India) Rudra Pratim Roy
Club Doctor	(India) Dr. Shantiranjan Dasgupta
Team Media Officer	(India) Gautam Roy
Team Observer	(India) Tushar Rakshit

== Kit ==
Supplier: Kaizen Sports Sponsors: Quess Corp Co-Sponsor: Paragon; Mio Amore
East Bengal FC launched its special Centenary year kit on 27 July 2019, as a tribute to the oldest kit found, and worn by the team in 1925–26.

Home	Away	Goalkeeper (H)	Goalkeeper (A)	Goalkeeper (3)

== Season overview ==
=== August ===

Lineup against Army Red in Durand Cup. The first match of centenary season.

East Bengal FC started their campaign for the season on 3 August against Army Red in the 2019 Durand Cup at the East Bengal Ground and won by 2–0, with goals from Jaime Santos Colado scoring from a freekick in the 85th minute and Bidyashagar Singh tapping home from a Samad Ali Mallick cross in the 91st minute. East Bengal FC played Jamshedpur FC (R) on 6th at the East Bengal Ground in the next match in the 2019 Durand Cup and won by a convincing 6–0 margin, with Jaime Santos Colado and Bidyashagar Singh each scoring a brace and other two scored by Pintu Mahata and Boithang Haokip. Jaime Santos suffered an injury to his shoulder early in the first half and was taken off to avoid any risk.
East Bengal FC started off their 2019–20 Calcutta Premier Division campaign on 9 August against George Telegraph S.C. at the East Bengal Ground, however, they faced a set-back as the Red and Gold brigade lost by a solitary goal scored by Justice Morgan in the dying minutes of the injury time. East Bengal FC fielded a rather weakened side, with 5 academy players in the starting eleven and just Martí Crespí in the lineup.

East Bengal FC faced Bengaluru FC next in the 2019 Durand Cup final Group A match on 14 August at the Salt Lake Stadium to secure a spot in the Semi-Finals. The visitors went ahead early in the game with an opportunistic strike from striker Ajay Chhetri. The Red and Gold brigade, however, rallied from behind in the second half with a brace from their academy graduate Bidyashagar Singh to win it 2–1 and top the group stages and enter the semi-finals.

East Bengal FC were supposed to face BSS Sporting Club in the 2019–20 Calcutta Premier Division on 17 August however, the match was postponed since the Red and Gold brigade will be playing in the 2019 Durand Cup Semi-Final on 21 August, against the winners of Group D at the Salt Lake Stadium.

East Bengal FC faced Gokulam Kerala F.C. in the Semi-Finals of the 2019 Durand Cup and lost in the Penalty Shootouts by a 2–3 margin after the game ended 1–1 after 120 minutes. Samad Ali Mallick scored the first goal for the Red and Gold brigade, however, Marcus Joseph made no mistakes as he equalized for the visiting side in the dying minutes of the match after Mehtab Singh conceded a penalty by pulling down Henry Kisekka, resulting in the former being sent-off. 10 men East Bengal FC took the match to the tie-breakers but Lalrindika Ralte, Jaime Santos Colado and Naorem Tondomba Singh missed from the spot as Gokulam Kerala F.C. progressed into the final.

East Bengal FC faced BSS Sporting Club in the next match on 25 August in the 2019–20 CFL at the East Bengal Ground and won it by 2–1 margin with goals from Jaime Santos Colado and academy graduate Bidyashagar Singh. William Opoku reduced the margin in the dying minutes from a penalty which was conceded as the ball struck Kamalpreet Singh's hand inside the box. Spanish striker Marcos de la Espada debuted in the match for the Red and Gold brigade and in the muddly playing conditions had a decent first outing.

East Bengal FC played Aryan F.C. next on 28 August in the Calcutta Football League at the East Bengal Ground and won quite handsomely by a 3–0 margin with Lalrindika Ralte opening the scoring in the 40th minute and Jaime Santos Colado netting a brace in the second half. The Red and Gold brigade would have had a huge scoreline if not for the missed chances in the second half from Bidyashagar Singh, Samad Ali Mallick, Ronaldo Oliviera.

=== September ===
East Bengal FC faced their arch-rivals Mohun Bagan next on 1 September at the Salt Lake Stadium in the first Kolkata Derby of the season. Coach Alejandro Menendez benched two top scorers Jaime Santos Colado and Bidyashagar Singh for the match, which ended in a goalless stalemate with both teams failing to break open the deadlock.

East Bengal FC faced Southern Samity in the next match of the 2019–20 CFL on 5 September at the East Bengal Ground and in a difficult underfoot conditions, emerged victorious by a 2–1 margin, with goals from academy graduate Bidyashagar Singh and star-man Jaime Santos Colado, both scoring their 7th goal of the season. Arjun Tudu reduced the margin for the visiting side but the Red and Gold brigade held onto the lead. East Bengal now has 10 points from 5 matches in the Calcutta Football League.

East Bengal FC faced Peerless SC in the next match of the 2019–20 CFL on 9 September at the East Bengal Ground and in a very hard-fought match, lost 0–1 courtesy of a penalty goal from Ansumana Kromah in the 65th minute. Marcos de la Espada's header hit the goalpost in the first half while Brandon Vanlalremdika and substitute Jaime Santos Colado failed to convert their chances as the Red and Gold brigade failed to take any point from the game.

East Bengal FC players and support staff were penalised by the IFA governing body for the after-match incident with the match referee. Captain Lalrindika Ralte and Mehtab Singh were both handed a match ban and 1 lakh Rupees fine, while team manager Debraj Chowdhury and goalkeeper coach Abhra Mondal were handed a year-long ban from all IFA competitions.

East Bengal FC faced Kalighat MS in the next match of the 2019–20 CFL on 12 September at the East Bengal Ground. After conceding a goal early in the 27th minute against the run of play, the Red and Gold brigade rallied from behind to score 3 goals, with Bidyashagar Singh equalizing in the first half then Pintu Mahata's shot deflected into the net off Lassine and then Jaime Santos Colado increasing the lead. Kalighat MS reduced the margin in the 82nd min to make the scoreline 3–2 but East Bengal team was fast to react as Jaime Santos scored again within a minute to take full 3 points from the match. East Bengal now stands 3rd in the table with 13 points of 7 matches.

East Bengal FC appealed to the IFA for the suspension of Manager and Goalkeeper coach and IFA has reduced the penalty of the duo as well as for the players. Manager Debraj Chowdhury and Goal Keeper coach Abhra Mondal are now just fined 75 thousand and their suspension is lifted, players Lalrindika Ralte and Mehtab Singh's fines are also reduced to 75 thousand from 1 lakh Rupees.

East Bengal FC faced Bhawanipore F.C. in the next match of the 2019–20 CFL on 16 September at the Kalyani Stadium and in a tense game, the Red and Gold brigade twice went ahead, however, both times nullified by Bhawanipur to end 2–2. Pintu Mahata scored the opener early in the 7th minute to take a 1–0 advantage at HT. Kamo Stephane Bayi equalised for the visitors. Borja Gomez Perez again put East Bengal ahead in the 83rd min however again Jagannath Sana equalised just a minute later.

East Bengal FC faced NBP Rainbow AC in the next match of the 2019–20 CFL on 20 September at the East Bengal Ground and managed to edge past by a solitary goal by Marcos de la Espada from the penalty spot in the 35th minute. Samad Ali Mallick was adjudged the Man of the Match for his brilliant display down the right-wing.

East Bengal FC faced their rivals Mohammedan Sporting in the next match of the 2019–20 CFL on 26 September at the Salt Lake Stadium and in a potential title decided the Red and Gold brigade edged past the Black Panthers by 3–2 scoreline. East Bengal took the lead early as Pintu Mahata headed home brilliantly from a cross from Kamalpreet Singh in the 12th minute. Mohammedan Sporting was quick to react as they equalised in the 23rd min as Borja Gomez Perez deflected the ball into his own net from a setpiece movement. In the 43rd min, East Bengal won a penalty after Shaiful Rahman stopped the ball with his hand as it was going into the goal, hence getting a red card in the process; Jaime Santos Colado did no mistake in scoring from the spot to take a 2–1 lead at HT. East Bengal increased the lead in the second half as Marcos de la Espada tapped in from close range from a Lalrindika Ralte cross to make it 3–1. The men in Black and White did surge for a comeback with 10 men as they reduced the margin in the 83rd min as Arthur Kouassi scored. However, East Bengal held onto the lead and kept their title hopes alive with 20 points from 10 matches with a game to go.

East Bengal FC was supposed to face Calcutta Customs in the last match of the 2019–20 CFL on 29 September at the East Bengal Ground however the match was abandoned due to unplayable conditions due to heavy rainfall, which caused water-clogging inside the playing arena. The match was rescheduled on 3 October at the Kalyani Stadium however East Bengal FC did not show up and Customs were given a Walkover.

=== November ===
East Bengal FC had their pre-season for the 2019–20 I-League in October, after they withdrew from the 2019 Sheikh Kamal International Club Cup. The Red and Gold brigade decided to play a set of pre-season friendlies against ISL sides before the start of the I-League. East Bengal FC played a friendly against 2018–19 Indian Super League Champions Bengaluru FC on 6 November at Bengaluru which ended 1–1. Marcos de la Espada opened the scoring early in the 4th minute, however, Edmund Lalrindika equalized for the home side from a long-range effort early in the second half to end the game in a stalemate.

East Bengal FC played their second pre-season friendly against another ISL opponent, NorthEast United FC on 16 November, at Indira Gandhi Athletic Stadium in Guwahati which ended in a goalless draw.

East Bengal FC played their third and final pre-season friendly against Indian Super League side Jamshedpur FC on 21 November, at the JFC Training Ground in Jamshedpur where they defeated the ISL team by 2–0 courtesy of goals from Abhijit Sarkar and Jaime Santos Colado to end their pre-season campaign before the start of the 2019–20 I-League.

=== December ===

Lineup against Real Kashmir in first match of I-League in the centenary year.

East Bengal FC began their 2019–20 I-League campaign against Real Kashmir F.C. on 4 December at the Kalyani Stadium. The match ended up 1–1 draw. Marcos de la Espada scored on behalf of East Bengal, and Juan Mera Gonzalez became Hero of the match.

East Bengal FC travelled to Ludhiana to face-off with Punjab FC on 7 December for their second match of the campaign and failed to win again as the match ended 1–1 draw. Juan Mera González scored the equaliser in the 85th min to avoid the defeat.

East Bengal FC travelled to Imphal for their third match of the 2019–20 I-League as they faced NEROCA F.C. on 10 December. The Red and Gold brigade managed to grab their first win of the campaign as the match ended 4–1 in favour of East Bengal. Jaime Santos Colado scored a brace while Juan Mera González and Marcos de la Espada scored the other two.

East Bengal FC faced TRAU F.C. next on 14 December at the Kalyani Stadium and in a close game, managed to grab all 3 points as the Red and Golds won 2–1 with goals from Marcos de la Espada in the 17th minute and Marti Crespi in the 89th minute. Deepak Devrani had equalized for the away side in the 45th minute.

East Bengal FC were supposed face their arch-rivals Mohun Bagan in the first Kolkata Derby of the 2019–20 I-League next on 22 December at the Salt Lake Stadium however the match was postponed citing security concerns by the police and home team Mohun Bagan.

=== January ===
East Bengal FC will faced Churchill Brothers away on 4 January at the Fatorda Stadium and lost courtesy of a solitary goal in the 89th minute from Willis Plaza. This was the first defeat of the campaign for the Red and Gold brigade.

On 8 January, East Bengal F.C. announced the signing of Abhash Thapa on loan from ISL side Hyderabad FC for the remainder of the season.

On 14 January, East Bengal F.C. announced their second winter transfer signing as they hired Bengaluru F.C. attacking midfielder Edmund Lalrindika on loan for the rest of the season.

East Bengal FC faced Gokulam Kerala F.C. at home on 15 January at the Kalyani Stadium and suffered their second defeat of the 2019–20 I-League campaign as they lost 3–1 to the Malabarians. Henry Kisekka, Marcus Joseph scored two while Marti Crespi scored an own goal as the visitors won the game. Kassim Aidara scored the only goal for the Red and Golds.

East Bengal FC faced arch-rivals Mohun Bagan on 19 January at the Salt Lake Stadium in the Kolkata Derby and faced their third defeat in a row as the Green and Maroons snatched a hard-fought 2–1 victory over the Red and Gold brigade. Joseba Beitia opened the scoring for the Mariners in the 18th minute. Baba Diawara increased the lead in the 62nd minute. Marcos de la Espada reduced the margin for East Bengal in the 72nd minute, however, they could find an equaliser with Juan Mera's shot hitting the crossbar was the closest East Bengal got.

On 21 January, just 2 days after the Kolkata Derby defeat, East Bengal FC announced that coach Alejandro Menendez had resigned from his position for personal reasons and taking responsibility if the poor performance of the team. The new coach will be announced within a few days.

On 22 January, the East Bengal FC management announced a double signing: Liberian striker Ansumana Kromah and Monotosh Chakladar for the remainder of the season.

Mario Rivera Campesino was appointed the new head coach on 23 January, a few hours later Alejandro Menendez left the city. Mario worked with the club in the previous season as the assistant coach and video analyst.

East Bengal FC faced defending champions Chennai City F.C. on 25 January at Coimbatore and finally came back to winning ways with a 2–0 win courtesy of a goal each from Marcos de la Espada and Jaime Santos Colado who scored from the spot. This was the first clean sheet the Red and Gold Brigade achieved in the 2019–20 I-League campaign.

=== February ===
East Bengal FC faced Indian Arrows on 1 February at the Kalyani Stadium in the next match and lost by 1–0, courtesy of a solitary goal by Vikram Pratap Singh in the 58th minute.

East Bengal FC played Aizawl F.C. next on 7 February at the Kalyani Stadium and lost once again by a solitary goal from Matias Veron in the 76th minute. This was their 5th defeat in 6 matches in the 2019–20 I-League campaign.

On 12 February, East Bengal FC announced the signing of Spanish defensive midfielder Víctor Pérez Alonso for the remainder of the season.

East Bengal FC faced Punjab F.C. next on 13 February at the Kalyani Stadium and in an intensely fought game managed to share points after the game ended in a 1–1 draw. Ansumana Kromah gave the lead for the Red and Gold brigade in the 9th minute with a long-range effort while Girik Khosla equalised for the visiting team in the 42nd minute to share the points.

East Bengal FC faced Indian Arrows next on 17 February at the Cooperage Ground in Mumbai and got back to winning ways with a 3–1 win courtesy of goals from Jaime Santos Colado in the 6th minute, Asheer Akhtar in the 62nd minute and Lalrindika Ralte in the 67th minute. Vikram Pratap Singh did equalize for the home team in the 54th minute before Asheer and Didika struck the two goals and secure the win.

East Bengal FC travelled to Imphal to face TRAU F.C. next on 23 January at the Khuman Lampak Main Stadium and won their second game in succession after a brilliant second half display to rally from behind to win 4–2. Princewell Emeka scored the opener for the home side in the 18th minute. East Bengal FC scored 4 goals in the second half courtesy of 4 different scorers: Jaime Santos Colado, Kassim Aidara, Brandon Vanlalremdika and Marcos de la Espada. Oguchi Uche reduced the margin for the home side in the 86th minute.

East Bengal FC faced Churchill Brothers S.C. next on 29 February at the Salt Lake Stadium and in a fiercely competitive match managed to share points with a dying minute equalizer goal from Jaime Santos Colado to make it 1–1. Willis Plaza scored the opening goal of the match in the 10th minute for Churchill Brothers.

=== March ===
East Bengal FC travelled to Kozhikode next to face Gokulam Kerala F.C. next on 3 March and drew 1–1 plying more than 35 mins against 10-men Gokulam Kerala FC side. Marcus Joseph opened the scoring in the 9th minute for the home side while Víctor Pérez Alonso equalised from the spot after Juan Mera was brought down in the 24th minute. Naocha Huidrom Singh was shown marching orders in the 49th minute for his second booking. Juan Mera and Victor Perez both struck the bar in the second half but could not find the winning goal as both teams shared the points.

East Bengal FC signed back Costa Rican World Cup star and former defender Jhonny Acosta ahead of the game against Real Kashmir FC and released Liberian striker Ansumana Kromah to make way for him.

East Bengal FC continued their travel to Srinagar next as they faced Real Kashmir F.C. on 9 March at the TRC Turf Ground and won by a solitary penalty goal in the dying minutes of the injury time by Víctor Pérez Alonso to snatch all 3 points and move up to the 2nd place in the league table. The game was ill-tempered and Real Kashmir FC had 3 players sent-off in the match while Edmund Lalrindika of Quess East Bengal FC was also given marching orders in the last seconds of the game which means he will miss the all-important Kolkata Derby next.

East Bengal FC was supposed to face arch-rivals Mohun Bagan in the second leg of the Kolkata Derby next on 15 March at the Salt Lake Stadium however due to the outbreak of COVID-19, all matches of the 2019–20 I-League has been suspended till 14 April until further notice. The revised schedule will be announced later.

=== April ===
On 18 April, due to the COVID-19 pandemic, the All India Football Federation announced that the remaining matches of 2019–20 I-League will be cancelled and Mohun Bagan was awarded as the champions. No team was relegated, and the remaining prize money (apart from the champion's prize money) was equally divided among the 10 teams.

On 26 April, East Bengal FC's prime investors Quess Corp announced they will be parting ways with the club after 30 April, owing to the COVID-19 pandemic, applying the "Force Majeure Clause".

== Competitions ==
=== Overall ===
Competition	First match	Last match	Final Position
Calcutta Football League	9 August 2019	3 October 2019	3rd
Durand Cup	3 August 2019	21 August 2018	Semi-Finals
I-League	4 December 2019	9 March 2020	2nd

=== Overview ===
Competition	Record							
Competition	Pld	W	D	L	GF	GA	GD	Win %
Calcutta Football League (Note: The game between East Bengal and Calcutta Customs was rescheduled due to unplayable weather & ground conditions, however on the later date East Bengal did not turn up & thus Customs were awarded a 3–0 win.)	11	6	2	3	17	13	+4	54.55
Durand Cup	4	3	1	0	11	2	+9	75.00
I League	16	6	5	5	23	18	+5	37.50
Total	31	15	8	8	51	33	+18	48.39

Last updated: 9 March 2020
Source: Competitions

=== Calcutta Football League ===
Pos	Team	Pld	W	D	L	GF	GA	GD	Pts	Qualification or relegation
1	Peerless	11	7	2	2	24	11	+13	23	Champions
2	Mohun Bagan	11	6	2	3	20	10	+10	20	
3	East Bengal	11	6	2	3	17	13	+4	20 (Note: The game between East Bengal and Calcutta Customs was rescheduled due to unplayable weather & ground conditions, however on the later date East Bengal did not turn up & thus Customs were awarded a 3-0 win.)	
4	Mohammedan	11	5	4	2	16	13	+3	19	Qualified for I-League Qualifiers
5	Bhawanipore	11	5	2	4	20	14	+6	17	Qualified for I-League Qualifiers

Notes:

Calcutta Football League fixtures were announced on 22 July 2019. East Bengal FC were supposed to start their campaign against George Telegraph S.C. on 31 July at the East Bengal Ground however fixtures were rescheduled due to unavailability of the stadiums and the first game was postponed to 9 August.

==== Results by round ====
Round	1	2	3	4	5	6	7	8	9	10	11
Ground	H	H	H	A	H	H	H	H	H	H	H
Result	L	W	W	D	W	L	W	D	W	W	L
Position	11	6	4	4	3	5	3	3	2	2	3

Updated to match(es) played on 27 September 2019. Source: Soccerway
A = Away; H = Home; W = Win; D = Draw; L = Loss

==== Matches ====
Win Draw Loss

9 August 2019 1	East Bengal	0–1	George Telegraph S.C.	Kolkata
15:00 IST		Report	Justice Morgan (yellow card) 65' (goal) 90+4'	Stadium: East Bengal Ground; Attendance: 20,000; Referee: Tanmoy Dhar; Man of the Match: Tanmoy Ghosh (George Telegraph S.C.)

25 August 2019 2	East Bengal	2–1	BSS Sporting Club	Kolkata
15:00 IST	Jaime Santos Colado 18' (yellow card) 41'; Bidyashagar Singh 53'	Report	William Opoku 90+3' (pen.)	Stadium: East Bengal Ground; Attendance: 15,000; Referee: Ranjit Bakshi; Man of the Match: Jaime Santos Colado (East Bengal FC)

28 August 2019 3	East Bengal	3–0	Aryan F.C.	Kolkata
15:00 IST	Lalrindika Ralte 42'; Jaime Santos Colado 61', 89'	Report		Stadium: East Bengal Ground; Attendance: 13,000; Referee: Mithun Kundu; Man of the Match: Syed Bin Abdul Kadir (Aryan F.C.)

1 September 2019 4	East Bengal	0–0	Mohun Bagan	Kolkata
15:00 IST	Kassim Aidara (yellow card) 39'; Lalrindika Ralte (yellow card) 80'	Report	Fran Morante (yellow card) 73'	Stadium: Salt Lake Stadium; Attendance: 65,000; Referee: C. R. Srikrishna; Man of the Match: Joseba Beitia (Mohun Bagan)
Note: (Exhibition match)

5 September 2019 5	East Bengal	2–1	Southern Samity	Kolkata
15:00 IST	Bidyashagar Singh 33'; Jaime Santos Colado 62'	Report	Ainish (yellow card) 56'; Arjun Tudu 82'	Stadium: East Bengal Ground; Attendance: 18,000; Referee: Animesh Biswas; Man of the Match: Mahmoud Amnah (Southern Samity)

9 September 2019 6	East Bengal	0–1	Peerless SC	Kolkata
15:00 IST	Abhishek Ambekar (yellow card) 13'; Borja Gomez Perez (yellow card) 90+1'	Report	Dipendu Dowary (yellow card) 33'; Ansumana Kromah 65' (pen.); Pankaj Moula (yellow card) 68'	Stadium: East Bengal Ground; Attendance: 15,000; Referee: Dipu Roy; Man of the Match: Varney Kallon (Peerless SC)

12 September 2019 7	East Bengal	4–2	Kalighat MS	Kolkata
14:30 IST	Bidyashagar Singh 42'; Karamoko Lassine 60' (o.g.); Jaime Santos Colado 64', 83'; Naorem Tondomba Singh (yellow card) 66'; Asheer Akhtar (yellow card) 86'	Report	Bhawani Jaiswar (yellow card) 29'; Tuhin Sikdar 38'; Alexander Kouame (red card) 66'; Rahul Kumar Paswan 82'	Stadium: East Bengal Ground; Attendance: 8,000; Referee: Pratick Mondal; Man of the Match: Jaime Santos Colado (East Bengal FC)

16 September 2019 8	East Bengal	2–2	Bhawanipore F.C.	Kalyani
14:30 IST	Pintu Mahata 7'; Juan Mera González (yellow card) 42'; Borja Gomez Perez 83'	Report	Kamo Stephane Bayi 58'; Jagannath Sana 84'	Stadium: Kalyani Stadium; Attendance: 15,000; Referee: Debasish Mandi; Man of the Match: Anto Sagayraj (Bhawanipore F.C.)

20 September 2019 9	East Bengal	1–0	NBP Rainbow	Kolkata
17:00 IST	Marcos de la Espada 35' (pen.)	Report		Stadium: East Bengal Ground; Attendance: 15,000; Referee: Rabin Biswas; Man of the Match: Samad Ali Mallick (East Bengal FC)

26 September 2019 10	East Bengal	3–2	Mohammedan Sporting	Kolkata
15:00 IST	Pintu Mahata 12'; Jaime Santos Colado 44' (pen.) (yellow card) 62'; Mehtab Singh (yellow card) 53'; Marcos de la Espada 58'	Report	Borja Gómez Pérez 24' (o.g.); Safiul Rahman (red card) 43'; Arthur Kouassi 83'	Stadium: Salt Lake Stadium; Attendance: 19,000; Referee: Crystal John; Man of the Match: Jaime Santos Colado (East Bengal FC)
Note: (Exhibition match)

3 October 2019 11	East Bengal	0–3	Calcutta Customs	Kalyani
14:30 IST		(W.O.)		Stadium: Kalyani Stadium; Referee: Biplob Bera

=== Durand Cup ===
On 8 July the fixtures were announced. East Bengal FC has been slotted into Group "A", along with Army Red, Jamshedpur FC and Bengaluru FC. One team from each of the 4 groups to go through to the Semi-Finals.

East Bengal FC topped the group stages winning all the matches however crashed out in the Semi-Final in the Penalty Shootout after the game ended 1–1 after 120 minutes against Gokulam Kerala F.C., who went on to win the 2019 Durand Cup defeating Mohun Bagan 2–1 in the final.

==== Group stage ====
Pos	Team	Pld	W	D	L	GF	GA	GD	Pts	Qualification
1	East Bengal	3	3	0	0	10	1	+9	9	Knockout stage
2	Bengaluru	3	0	2	1	5	6	−1	2	
3	Army Red	3	0	2	1	3	5	−2	2	
4	Jamshedpur	3	0	2	1	5	11	−6	2	

Rules for classification: Group stage tiebreakers

==== Matches ====
Win Draw Loss

3 August 2019 Group Stage	Quess East Bengal	2–0	Army Red	Kolkata
15:00 IST	Boithang Haokip (yellow card) 67'; Jaime Santos Colado 85'; Bidyashagar Singh 90+1'	Report	Alwin (yellow card) 26'; Zothanpuia (yellow card) 45+1'; Shanoos (red card) 83'	Stadium: East Bengal Ground; Attendance: 17,000; Referee: R Venkatesh; Man of the Match: Jaime Santos Colado (East Bengal FC)

6 August 2019 Group Stage	Quess East Bengal	6–0	Jamshedpur FC	Kolkata
15:00 IST	Jaime Santos Colado 6' (pen.), 8'; Pintu Mahata 33'; Bidyashagar Singh 75', 81'; Boithang Haokip 90+1'	Report	Amrit Gope (yellow card) 4'; Baset Hansdah (yellow card) 63'	Stadium: East Bengal Ground; Attendance: 12,000; Referee: Crystal John; Man of the Match: Pintu Mahata (East Bengal FC)

14 August 2019 Group Stage	Quess East Bengal	2–1	Bengaluru FC	Kolkata
18:00 IST	Bidyashagar Singh 59', 74' (yellow card) 90+4'	Report	Ajay Chhetri 17'	Stadium: Salt Lake Stadium; Attendance: 5,000; Referee: Tejas Nagvenkar; Man of the Match: Bidyashagar Singh (East Bengal FC)

==== Knockouts ====
Semi-finals; 21 August 2019
East Bengal	1 (2)
Gokulam Kerala (p)	1 (3)
Mohun Bagan (a.e.t.)	3
Real Kashmir	1

Final; 24 August 2019
Gokulam Kerala	2
Mohun Bagan	1

==== Matches ====
21 August 2019 Semi Final	East Bengal	1–1 (a.e.t.) (2–3 p)	Gokulam Kerala	Kolkata
15:00 IST	Samad Ali Mallick 19'; Bidyashagar Singh (yellow card) 80'; Borja Gomez Perez (yellow card) 90+1'; Mehtab SIngh (red card) 90+2'; Kamalpreet Singh (yellow card) 90+6'; Kassim Aidara (yellow card) 120+2'; Jaime Santos Colado (yellow card) 120+4'	Report	Mohammed Irshad (yellow card) 57'; Marcus Joseph 90+4' (pen.) (yellow card) 120'	Stadium: Salt Lake Stadium; Attendance: 18,162; Referee: Tejas Nagvenkar; Man of the Match: Ubaid CK (Gokulam Kerala F.C.)
	Penalties
	Lalrindika Ralte (penalty missed); Jaime Santos Colado (penalty missed); Marti Crespi (penalty scored); Boithang Haokip (penalty scored); Naorem Tondomba Singh (penalty missed)		(penalty scored) Bruno Pelissari; (penalty missed) Malemngamba Meitei; (penalty scored) Jestin George; (penalty scored) Lalromawia

=== Preseason matches ===
In preparation for the 2019–20 I-League, East Bengal FC have decided to play a set of preseason friendly matches against ISL opponents. The first match was against 2018–19 Indian Super League Champions Bengaluru FC, on 6 November in Bengaluru. East Bengal FC played NorthEast United FC in their second pre-season friendly match on 16 November at Guwahati. East Bengal FC played their final friendly against Jamshedpur FC on 21 November at Jamshedpur.

==== Matches ====
Win Draw Loss

6 November 2019 Friendly	Bengaluru FC	1–1	East Bengal	Bengaluru
09:30 IST	Edmund Lalrindika 70'	Report	Marcos de la Espada 4'	Stadium: R.B.A.N.M. First Grade College Ground; Attendance: 100

16 November 2019 Friendly	NorthEast United FC	0–0	East Bengal	Guwahati
13:30 IST		Report		Stadium: Indira Gandhi Athletic Stadium; Attendance: 100

21 November 2019 Friendly	Jamshedpur FC	0–2	East Bengal	Jamshedpur
18:30 IST		Report	Abhijit Sarkar 74'; Jaime Santos Colado 87'	Stadium: JFC Training Ground

=== I-League ===
Pos	Team	Pld	W	D	L	GF	GA	GD	Pts	Qualification or relegation
1	Mohun Bagan (C)	16	12	3	1	35	13	+22	39	Qualification for 2021 AFC Cup group stage
2	East Bengal	16	6	5	5	23	18	+5	23	
3	Punjab	16	5	8	3	23	21	+2	23	
4	Real Kashmir	15	6	4	5	16	14	+2	22	
5	Gokulam Kerala	15	6	4	5	20	19	+1	22	

Source: I-league, RSSSF
Rules for classification: 1) points; 2) head-to-head points; 3) head-to-head goal difference; 4) goal difference; 5) number of goals scored; 6) drawing of lots
(C) Champions

==== Result summary ====
Overall								Home						Away					
Pld	W	D	L	GF	GA	GD	Pts	W	D	L	GF	GA	GD	W	D	L	GF	GA	GD
16	6	5	5	23	18	+5	23	1	3	3	6	9	−3	5	2	2	17	9	+8

Last updated: 9 March 2020.
Source: i-league.org

==== Results by round ====
Round	1	2	3	4	5	6	7	8	9	10	11	12	13	14	15	16	17	18	19	20
Ground	H	A	A	H	A	H	A	A	H	H	H	A	A	H	A	A	H	H	H	A
Result	D	D	W	W	L	L	L	W	L	L	D	W	W	D	D	W	C	C	C	C
Position	5	5	3	1	3	5	6	4	6	8	9	6	4	4	4	2				

Updated to match(es) played on 09 March 2020. Source: Soccrway
A = Away; H = Home; W = Win; D = Draw; L = Loss; C = Cancelled

==== Matches ====
Win Draw Loss Void Postponed

4 December 2019 1	East Bengal	1–1	Real Kashmir	Kalyani, West Bengal
17:00 IST	Marcos Espada 77'; Kassim Aidara (yellow card) 69'; Marti Crespi (yellow card) 90+5'	Report	Gnohere Krizo 33'; Ritwik Kumar Das (yellow card) 15'; Arashpreet Singh (yellow card) 70'; Gnohere Krizo (yellow card) 71'	Stadium: Kalyani Stadium; Attendance: 11,592; Referee: Om Prakash Thakur; Man of the Match: Juan Mera González (East Bengal)

7 December 2019 2	Punjab	1–1	East Bengal	Ludhiana, Punjab
14:00 IST	Danilo Quipapá 13'; Bali Gagandeep (yellow card) 20'; Aser Pierrick Dipanda (yellow card) 39'; Samuel Shadap (yellow card) 75'	Report	Juan Mera González 85'; Marti Crespi (yellow card) 56'; Kassim Aidara (yellow card) 67'; Mirshad Michu (yellow card) 72'; Abhishek Ambekar (yellow card) 75'	Stadium: Guru Nanak Stadium; Attendance: 4,587; Referee: Umesh Bora; Man of the Match: Danilo Quipapá (Punjab F.C.)

10 December 2019 3	NEROCA	1–4	East Bengal	Imphal, Manipur
14:00 IST	Boubacar Diarra 31'; Ousmane Diawara (yellow card) 7'; Sekle Yao Zico (yellow card) 36'	Report	Jaime Santos Colado 20' (pen.), 52' (pen.); Juan Mera González 33'; Marcos de la Espada 63'	Stadium: Khuman Lampak Main Stadium; Attendance: 19,782; Referee: R Palmson Moses Raj; Man of the Match: Jaime Santos Colado (East Bengal)

14 December 2019 4	East Bengal	2–1	TRAU	Kalyani, West Bengal
14:00 IST	Marcos de la Espada 17'; Marti Crespi Pascual 88' (yellow card) 16'; Juan Mera González (yellow card) 71'	Report	Deepak Devrani 45'; Sandeep Singh (yellow card) 16'; Angousana Luwang (yellow card) 78'; Denechandram Meitei (yellow card) 61'	Stadium: Kalyani Stadium; Attendance: 9,882; Referee: Raktim Saha; Man of the Match: Premjit Singh (TRAU F.C.)

4 January 2020 5	Churchill Brothers	1–0	East Bengal	Margao, Goa
17:00 IST	Willis Plaza 89'; Robert Primus (yellow card) 25'	Report	Marcos de la Espada (yellow card) 30'; Kassim Aidara (yellow card) 43'	Stadium: Fatorda Stadium; Attendance: 3,226; Referee: Santosh Kumar; Man of the Match: Willis Plaza (Churchill Brothers S.C.)

15 January 2020 6	East Bengal	1–3	Gokulam Kerala	Kalyani, West Bengal
17:00 IST	Kassim Aidara 27'	Report	Henry Kisekka 21'; Marcus Joseph 65'; Marti Crespi (o.g.) 45'	Stadium: Kalyani Stadium; Attendance: 9232; Referee: C.R. Srikrishna; Man of the Match: Marcus Joseph (Gokulam Kerala F.C.)

19 January 2020 7^{(KD)}	Mohun Bagan	2–1	East Bengal	Kolkata, West Bengal
17:00 IST	Joseba Beitia 18'; Baba Diawara 65'; Fran González (yellow card) 36'; Daneil Cyrus (yellow card) 45+1'; Gurjinder Kumar (yellow card) 66'; SK Sahil (yellow card) 81'; Sankar Roy (yellow card) 90+1'	Report	Marti Crespi (yellow card) 40'; Marcos de la Espada 71'	Stadium: Salt Lake Stadium; Attendance: 63,756; Referee: Ajitkumar Meitei; Man of the Match: Joseba Beitia (Mohun Bagan AC)
Note: Match postponed from 22 December 2019, to 19 January 2020 due to security concerns.

25 January 2020 8	Chennai City	0–2	East Bengal	Coimbatore, Tamil Nadu
17:00 IST	Shem Marton Eugene (yellow card) 38'; Pradison Mariyadasan (yellow card) 88'	Report	Marcos de la Espada 68'; Jaime Santos Colado (penalty missed) 15' 77' (pen.); Kamalpreet Singh (yellow card) 31'; Lalrindika Ralte (yellow card) 42'; Juan Mera Gonzalez (yellow card) 86'	Stadium: JL Nehru Stadium; Attendance: 6,250; Referee: Rowan Arumughan; Man of the Match: Jaime Santos Colado (Quess East Bengal FC)

1 February 2020 9	East Bengal	0–1	Indian Arrows	Kalyani, West Bengal
17:00 IST	Marcos de la Espada (yellow card) 21' (yellow-red card) 90+5'; Asheer Akhtar (yellow card) 36'; Juan Mera Gonzalez (yellow card) 78'	Report	Vikram Pratap Singh 59'; Rv. Hormipam (yellow card) 27'	Stadium: Kalyani Stadium; Attendance: 6340; Referee: Ibungo Meetei; Man of the Match: Lalbiakhlua Jongte (Indian Arrows)

7 February 2020 10	East Bengal	0–1	Aizawl	Kalyani, West Bengal
17:00 IST		Report	Matias Veron 77'; Alfred Jaryan (yellow card) 28'; Zothanmawia (yellow card) 84'; Justice Morgan (yellow card) 88'; Juuko Richard Kassaga (yellow card) 90+4'	Stadium: Kalyani Stadium; Attendance: 5,130; Referee: Palmson Moses Raj; Man of the Match: Rochharzela (Aizawl FC)

13 February 2020 11	East Bengal	1–1	Punjab	Kalyani, West Bengal
17:00 IST	Ansumana Kromah 9'; Mehtab Singh (yellow card) 79'	Report	Girik Khosla 40'; Sérgio Barboza (yellow card) 64'; Nirmal Chettri (yellow card) 82'	Stadium: Kalyani Stadium; Attendance: 4,573; Referee: Umesh Bora; Man of the Match: Ansumana Kromah (Quess East Bengal FC)

17 February 2020 12	Indian Arrows	1–3	East Bengal	Mumbai, Maharashtra
19:00 IST	Vikram Pratap Singh (penalty missed) 46' 54' (yellow card) 56'; Akash Mishra (yellow card) 80'	Report	Jaime Santos 5'; Asheer Akhtar 62' (yellow card) 7'; Lalrindika Ralte 67'	Stadium: Cooperage Ground; Attendance: 2,512; Referee: Rahul Kumar Gupta; Man of the Match: Lalrindika Ralte (Quess East Bengal FC)

23 February 2020 13	TRAU	2–4	East Bengal	Imphal, Manipur
17:00 IST	Princewill Emeka Olariche 18'; Oguchi Uche 85' (pen.) (yellow card) 56'; Loken Meitei (yellow card) 60'; Shahbaaz Khan (yellow card) 67'	Report	Jaime Santos Colado 52' (yellow card) 56'; Kassim Aidara 67' (yellow card) 39'; Brandon Vanlalremdika 69' (yellow card) 70'; Marcos de la Espada 76' (pen.); Asheer Akhtar (yellow card) 78'	Stadium: Khuman Lampak Main Stadium; Attendance: 26,612; Referee: Raktim Saha; Man of the Match: Brandon Vanlalremdika (East Bengal F.C.)

29 February 2020 14	East Bengal	1–1	Churchill Brothers	Kolkata, West Bengal
17:00 IST	Jaime Santos Colado 90+5' (pen.); Samad Ali Mallick (yellow card) 56'; Mehtab Singh (yellow card) 90'	Report	Willis Plaza 10'; Jovel Martins (yellow card) 41'; Ponif Vaz (yellow card) 89'; Suresh Meitei (yellow card) 90+5'	Stadium: Vivekananda Yuba Bharati Krirangan; Attendance: 12,722; Referee: Rowan Arumughan; Man of the Match: Quan Gomes (Churchill Brothers SC)

3 March 2020 15	Gokulam Kerala	1–1	East Bengal	Kozhikode, Kerala
19:00 IST	Marcus Joseph 8'; Huidrom Singh (yellow card) 24' (yellow-red card) 49'; Haroon Amiri (yellow card) 87' (yellow-red card) 90+1'; Andre Ettienne (yellow card) 90+5'	Report	Víctor Pérez Alonso 24' (pen.) (yellow card) 88'; Abhash Thapa (yellow card) 68'; Samad Ali Mallick (yellow card) 78'; Marcos de la Espada (yellow card) 90+6'	Stadium: EMS Stadium; Attendance: 12,624; Referee: Tejas Visvasrao Nagvenkar; Man of the Match: Nathaniel García (Gokulam Kerala)

9 March 2020 16	Real Kashmir	0–1	East Bengal	Srinagar, Jammu and Kashmir
14:00 IST	Danish Farooq (yellow card) 19' (yellow-red card) 38'; Robin Singh (yellow card) 25'; Mason Robertson (yellow card) 26'; Bazie Armand (yellow card) 55'; Kallum Higginbotham (red card) 90+8'	Report	Victor Perez Alonso 90+5' (pen.); Kassim Aidara (yellow card) 87'; Edmund Lalrindika (red card) 90+8'	Stadium: TRC Turf Ground; Attendance: 10,223; Referee: Umesh Bora; Man of the Match: Chesterpoul Lyngdoh (Real Kashmir F.C.)

17^{(KD)}	East Bengal	cancelled	Mohun Bagan	Kolkata, West Bengal
				Stadium: Vivekananda Yuba Bharati Krirangan
Note: Matches after 13 March 2020 were cancelled, due to coronavirus pandemic

18	East Bengal	cancelled	Chennai City	Kolkata, West Bengal
				Stadium: Vivekananda Yuba Bharati Krirangan
Note: Matches after 13 March 2020 were cancelled, due to coronavirus pandemic

19	East Bengal	cancelled	NEROCA	Kolkata, West Bengal
				Stadium: Vivekananda Yuba Bharati Krirangan
Note: Matches after 13 March 2020 were cancelled, due to coronavirus pandemic

20	Aizawl	cancelled	East Bengal	Aizawl, Mizoram
				Stadium: Rajiv Gandhi Stadium, Aizawl
Note: Matches after 13 March 2020 were cancelled, due to coronavirus pandemic

== Statistics ==
=== Appearances ===
Players with no appearances not included in the list.

As of match played 09 March 2020

Appearances for East Bengal FC in 2019–20 season
No.	Pos.	Nat.	Name	CFL		Durand Cup		I League		Total	
No.	Pos.	Nat.	Name	Apps	Starts	Apps	Starts	Apps	Starts	Apps	Starts
Goalkeepers
1	GK	(India)	Lalthuammawia Ralte	9	9	2	2	9	9	20	20
32	GK	(India)	Mirshad Michu	0	0	2	2	7	7	9	9
40	GK	(India)	Rakshit Dagar	1	1	0	0	0	0	1	1
Defenders
2	DF	(India)	Asheer Akhtar	6	4	2	2	11	11	19	17
—	DF	(Spain)	Borja Gomez Perez (Note: Released mid-way in the season.)	5	4	3	2	0	0	8	6
4	DF	(Costa Rica)	Jhonny Acosta	—				1	1	1	1
5	DF	(India)	Kamalpreet Singh	6	5	3	2	9	9	18	16
6	DF	(India)	Gurwinder Singh	—				2	1	2	1
15	DF	(India)	Abhash Thapa	—				8	7	8	7
—	DF	(Spain)	Martí Crespí	6	6	2	2	8	8	16	16
25	DF	(India)	Samad Ali Mallick	7	5	2	2	12	10	21	17
27	DF	(India)	Abhishek Ambekar	8	6	2	2	10	9	20	19
28	DF	(India)	Monotosh Chakladar	—				1	0	1	0
29	DF	(India)	Mehtab Singh	6	6	2	2	11	11	19	19
41	DF	(India)	Manoj Mohammed	4	4	2	2	0	0	6	6
Midfielders
7	MF	(India)	Abhijit Sarkar	1	1	1	1	6	1	8	3
8	MF	(Spain)	Jaime Santos Colado	9	6	4	4	15	15	28	25
9	MF	(India)	Boithang Haokip	4	2	4	2	1	0	9	4
11	MF	(India)	Pintu Mahata	8	7	4	3	7	6	19	14
14	MF	(India)	Naorem Tondomba	7	7	3	1	8	3	18	11
16	MF	(France)	Kassim Aidara	5	3	4	3	14	14	23	20
20	MF	(India)	Lalrindika Ralte	8	7	3	3	8	8	19	18
23	MF	(Spain)	Juan Mera González	5	4	—		15	14	20	18
24	MF	(Spain)	Víctor Pérez Alonso	—				4	3	4	3
30	MF	(India)	Brandon Vanlalremdika	7	4	4	4	12	8	23	16
38	MF	(India)	Prakash Sarkar	1	1	1	0	0	0	2	1
43	MF	(India)	PC Rohlupuia	4	2	1	1	5	1	10	4
—	MF	(India)	Subhonil Ghosh	1	1	0	0	0	0	1	1
Forwards
17	FW	(India)	Edmund Lalrindika	—				2	0	2	0
18	FW	(Spain)	Marcos de la Espada	6	4	—		14	14	20	18
—	FW	(India)	Ronaldo Oliveira	8	5	—		4	1	12	6
—	FW	(Liberia)	Ansumana Kromah	—				8	4	8	4
26	FW	(India)	Bidyashagar Singh	8	6	4	2	5	1	17	9

=== Goal scorers ===
Goal Scorers for East Bengal FC in 2019–20 season
Rank	No.	Pos.	Nat.	Name	Durand Cup	CFL	I League	Total
1	8	MF	(Spain)	Jaime Santos Colado	3	7	6	16
2	18	FW	(Spain)	Marcos de la Espada	—	2	6	8
2	26	FW	(India)	Bidyashagar Singh	5	3	0	8
4	11	MF	(India)	Pintu Mahata	1	2	0	3
5	16	MF	(France)	Kassim Aidara	0	0	2	2
5	20	MF	(India)	Lalrindika Ralte	0	1	1	2
5	23	MF	(Spain)	Juan Mera González	—	0	2	2
5	24	MF	(Spain)	Víctor Pérez Alonso	—		2	2
9	2	DF	(India)	Asheer Akhtar	0	0	1	1
9	3	DF	(Spain)	Borja Gomez Perez	0	1	—	1
9	9	MF	(India)	Boithang Haokip	1	0	0	1
9	21	DF	(Spain)	Marti Crespi Pascual	0	0	1	1
9	22	FW	(Liberia)	Ansumana Kromah	—		1	1
9	25	DF	(India)	Samad Ali Mallick	1	0	0	1
9	30	MF	(India)	Brandon Vanlalremdika	0	0	1	1
				Own Goals	0	1	0	1
TOTAL					11	17	23	51

=== Clean sheets ===
As of matches played 9 March 2020

No.	Player	CFL	Durand Cup	I League	Super Cup	TOTAL
1	Lalthuammawia Ralte	3	1	0	0	4
32	Mirshad Michu	0	1	2	0	3

=== Disciplinary record ===
As of matches played 09 March 2020

No.	Pos.	Name	CFL			Durand Cup			I League			Total			Remarks
No.	Pos.	Name	Yellow card	(yellow card) (yellow-red card)	Red card	Yellow card	(yellow card) (yellow-red card)	Red card	Yellow card	(yellow card) (yellow-red card)	Red card	Yellow card	(yellow card) (yellow-red card)	Red card	Remarks
2	DF	Asheer Akhtar	1	0	0	0	0	0	3	0	0	4	0	0	
3	DF	Borja Gomez Perez	1	0	0	1	0	0	0	0	0	2	0	0	
5	DF	Kamalpreet Singh	0	0	0	1	0	0	1	0	0	2	0	0	
8	MF	Jaime Santos Colado	2	0	0	1	0	0	1	0	0	4	0	0	
9	MF	Boithang Haokip	0	0	0	1	0	0	0	0	0	1	0	0	
14	MF	Tondomba Singh	2	0	0	0	0	0	0	0	0	2	0	0	
15	DF	Abhash Thapa	0	0	0	0	0	0	1	0	0	1	0	0	
16	MF	Kassim Aidara	1	0	0	1	0	0	5	0	0	7	0	0	missed home match against Churchill Brothers
17	FW	Edmund Lalrindika	0	0	0	0	0	0	0	0	1	0	0	1	
18	FW	Marcos de la Espada	0	0	0	0	0	0	4	1	0	4	1	0	missed home match against Aizawl
20	MF	Lalrindika Ralte	1	0	0	0	0	0	1	0	0	2	0	0	
21	DF	Marti Crespi	0	0	0	0	0	0	4	0	0	4	0	0	missed away match against Chennai City
23	MF	Juan Mera González	1	0	0	0	0	0	3	0	0	4	0	0	
24	MF	Víctor Pérez Alonso	0	0	0	0	0	0	1	0	0	1	0	0	
25	DF	Samad Ali Mallick	0	0	0	0	0	0	2	0	0	2	0	0	
26	FW	Bidyashagar Singh	0	0	0	2	0	0	0	0	0	2	0	0	
27	DF	Abhishek Ambekar	1	0	0	0	0	0	1	0	0	2	0	0	
29	DF	Mehtab Singh	1	0	0	0	0	1	1	0	0	2	0	1	
30	MF	Brandon Vanlalremdika	0	0	0	0	0	0	1	0	0	1	0	0	
32	GK	Mirshad Michu	0	0	0	0	0	0	1	0	0	1	0	0	

== Honours ==
=== Individual awards ===
==== I-League Coach of the Month ====
Month	Name
December	Alejandro Menendez

== See also ==
- 2019–20 in Indian football
- 2019–20 Calcutta Premier Division
- Super Cup
- List of East Bengal F.C. managers
- List of Foreign Players for East Bengal FC
