= List of 2020–21 I-League season roster changes =

This is a list of all roster changes that occurred prior to the 2020–21 I-League season.

== Player movement and other transactions ==
=== Team changes ===
Date	Name	Previous club	I-League club	Transfer Type
4 April 2020	(Pakistan) Kashif Siddiqi	(England) Oxford United	(India) Real Kashmir	Loan
31 May 2020	(India) Subhash Singh	(India) NEROCA	(India) Real Kashmir	Loan return
31 May 2020	(India) Mithun Samanta	(India) TRAU	(India) East Bengal	Loan return
1 October 2020	(Liberia) Varney Kallon	(India) Peerless S.C.	(India) NEROCA	Free
2 October 2020	(Singapore) Jayan Varghese	(Singapore) Geylang International	(India) NEROCA	Free

=== Released players ===
This list includes players who were released from their club and who have yet to sign with another I-League club or who have left the league.

Date	Name	Released by	New club (Non-I-League)	Transfer Type
31 March 2020	(Serbia) Jan Muzangu	(India) Chennai City	(Switzerland) Basel U21	Loan Return
1 April 2020	(Japan) Katsumi Yusa	(India) Chennai City	N/A	Free Agent
15 April 2020	(Spain) Sandro Rodríguez	(India) Chennai City	N/A	Free Agent
1 May 2020	(Spain) Nauzet Santana	(India) Chennai City	N/A	Free Agent
1 May 2020	(Spain) Roberto Eslava	(India) Chennai City	(Spain) CD Izarra	Free
1 May 2020	(Spain) Fito	(India) Chennai City	N/A	Free Agent
1 May 2020	(Costa Rica) Jhonny Acosta	(India) East Bengal	N/A	Free Agent
1 May 2020	(Spain) Víctor Pérez	(India) East Bengal	N/A	Free Agent
1 May 2020	(France) Kassim Aidara	(India) East Bengal	N/A	Free Agent
1 May 2020	(Spain) Juan Mera	(India) East Bengal	(Spain) CD Lealtad	Free
1 May 2020	(Spain) Marcos	(India) East Bengal	N/A	Free Agent
1 May 2020	(India) Rakshit Dagar	(India) East Bengal	N/A	Free Agent
1 May 2020	(India) Kamalpreet Singh	(India) East Bengal	N/A	Free Agent
1 May 2020	(India) Gurwinder Singh	(India) East Bengal	N/A	Free Agent
1 May 2020	(India) Monotosh Chakladar	(India) East Bengal	N/A	Free Agent
1 May 2020	(India) Bidyashagar Singh	(India) East Bengal	N/A	Free Agent
1 May 2020	(India) Koushik Sarkar	(India) Mohun Bagan	N/A	Free Agent
1 May 2020	(India) Sukhdev Singh	(India) Mohun Bagan	N/A	Free Agent
1 May 2020	(India) Babun Das	(India) Mohun Bagan	N/A	Free Agent
31 May 2020	(India) Debjit Majumder	(India) Mohun Bagan	(India) ATK	Loan return
31 May 2020	(India) Nongdamba Naorem	(India) Mohun Bagan	(India) Kerala Blasters	Loan return
31 May 2020	(India) Alexander Romario Jesuraj	(India) Mohun Bagan	(India) Goa	Loan return
31 May 2020	(India) Kivi Zhimomi	(India) Churchill Brothers	(India) NorthEast United	Loan return
31 May 2020	(India) Lovepreet Singh	(India) Indian Arrows	(India) Kerala Blasters	Loan return
31 May 2020	(India) Tarif Akhand	(India) Chennai City	(India) Hyderabad	Loan return
31 May 2020	(India) Nikhil Raj	(India) Indian Arrows	(India) Kickstart FC	Loan return
31 May 2020	(India) Robin Singh	(India) Real Kashmir	(India) Hyderabad	Loan return
31 May 2020	(India) Avilash Paul	(India) Mohun Bagan	(India) ATK	Loan return
31 May 2020	(India) Aman Chetri	(India) Indian Arrows	(India) Chennaiyin B	Loan return
31 May 2020	(Nigeria) Joseph Olaleye	(India) TRAU	(India) Green Valley	Loan return
22 June 2020	(Afghanistan) Zohib Islam Amiri	(India) Gokulam Kerala	N/A	Free Agent
12 July 2020	(England) Kallum Higginbotham	(India) Real Kashmir	(Scotland) Kelty Hearts	Free
29 July 2020	(Hungary) Attila Busai	(India) NEROCA	(Sweden) Nyköping	Free
1 August 2020	(Liberia) Ansumana Kromah	(India) East Bengal	(India) Bhawanipore	Undisclosed
