= P. C. Rohlupuia =

Indian professional footballer

PC Rohlupuia
Personal information
- Date of birth: 16 January 1999 (age 27)
- Place of birth: Mizoram, India
- Height: 1.77 m (5 ft 9 1/2 in)
- Position: Midfielder

Team information
- Current team: Sudeva Delhi

Youth career
- 2016–2018: East Bengal

Senior career*
Years	Team	Apps	(Gls)
2018–2020	East Bengal	8	(0)
2020–2022	Mumbai City II	0	(0)
2020–2024	Mumbai City	1	(0)
2022	→ Kenkre (loan)	10	(0)
2024–	Sudeva Delhi	0	(0)
- * Club domestic league appearances and goals as of 21:50, 21 February 2023 (UTC)

PC Rohlupuia (born 16 January 1999) is an Indian professional footballer who played as a central midfielder for I-League 2 club Sudeva Delhi.

== Career ==
Rohlupuia started his career with the youth academy of East Bengal FC and played for the East Bengal FC U-18 side. The academy coach, Ranjan Chowdhury, scouted Rohlupuia from Mizoram and brought him to East Bengal, where he developed as a ball-playing central midfielder. He reached the semi-finals of the 2017–18 I-League U18, where he impressed throughout the campaign and scored 2 goals, but the team lost to Shillong Lajong FC in the semi-finals by 2–0.

=== East Bengal FC ===
==== 2018–19 ====
In 2018–19, under coach Alejandro Menendez, Rohlupuia was promoted to the senior side and was part of the team which toured Malaysia for the pre-season and played 4 friendlies as a part of the preparation for the 2018-19 I-League. He joined the team as a central midfielder but spent most of the season on the reserve bench and played only in one game as he made his senior debut when he came on from the bench against Minerva Punjab F.C. away at Tau Devi Lal Stadium, Chandigarh, on 3 March 2019, which East Bengal FC won 1–0. Rohlupuia played just 8 minutes in the game.

==== 2019–20 ====
At the start of 2019–20 season, Rohlupuia signed a three-years contract extension with East Bengal, along with Manoj Mohammed and Prakash Sarkar, keeping him at the club until 2022.

Lineup against Army Red in Durand Cup. The first match of centenary season.

He was started in the very first game of the Centenary Season as a central midfielder beside Lalrindika Ralte, against Army Red in the 2019 Durand Cup which East Bengal won 2–0 with goals from Jaime Santos Colado and Bidyashagar Singh.

== Career statistics ==
=== Club ===
As of 4 May 2022

Club	Season	League			Cup		AFC		Total	
Club	Season	Division	Apps	Goals	Apps	Goals	Apps	Goals	Apps	Goals
East Bengal	2018–19	I-League	1	0	0	0	–		1	0
East Bengal	2019–20	I-League	7	0	1 (Note: Appearance(s) in Durand Cup)	0	–		8	0
Mumbai City	2020–21	Indian Super League	0	0	0	0	–		0	0
Kenkre (loan)	2021–22	I-League	10	0	0	0	–		10	0
Career total			18	0	1	0	0	0	19	0

== Honours ==
=== Club ===
East Bengal:

- I-League: runner-up: 2018-19

Mumbai City:

- Indian Super League (Premiership): 2022–23
