= Ronaldo Oliveira =

Indian footballer

Personal information
- Full name: Ronaldo Augusto Antonio Oliveira
- Date of birth: 2 November 1997 (age 29)
- Place of birth: Goa, India
- Height: 1.70 m (5 ft 7 in)
- Position: Winger

Team information
- Current team: RoundGlass Punjab
- Number: 9

Youth career
- 2015–2017: Salgaocar

Senior career*
Years	Team	Apps	(Gls)
2017–2019	Salgaocar	22	(18)
2019–2020	East Bengal	4	(0)
2020	Kerala Blasters B	5	(4)
2020–2022	Bengaluru United	7	(0)
2022	Goa B		
2022–	RoundGlass Punjab	0	(0)
- * Club domestic league appearances and goals as of 22:22, 13 October 2021 (UTC)

Ronaldo Augusto Antonio Oliveira (born 2 November 1997) is an Indian professional footballer who plays as a winger for I-League club RoundGlass Punjab.

== Youth career ==
Ronaldo started his career in the youth academy of Salgaocar and participated in the 2015-16 U-18 I-League and reached the Semi-Finals. He scored 9 goals for Salgaocar U18 in the tournament.

== Career ==
=== Salgaocar ===
In 2017–18, he was promoted to the Salgaocar senior side and participated in the Goa Professional League. In the 2018–19 Goa Professional League, Ronaldo scored 23 goals as he became the top scorer and helped Salgaocar finish 4th in the 2018-19 Goa Professional League. Ronaldo scored a few hatricks in the tournament which included 4 goals in one game against FC Bardez on 21 February 2019. In August 2018, he caught the eye of scouts as he scored against Indian Super League side Pune City in the Awes Cup and helped Salgaocar win by 2–0.

In 2019, Ronaldo represented Goa in the 2018–19 Santosh Trophy and reached the Semi-Finals where they lost by 2–1 to Punjab. Ronaldo scored the only goal for Goa in the Semi-Final.

=== East Bengal ===
In 2019, Ronaldo signed for I-League side and Kolkata giants: East Bengal FC on a 3 years contract, after a successful week of trials under the observation of coach Alejandro Menendez.

He made his debut against George Telegraph on 9 August in the 2019–20 Calcutta Premier Division which East Bengal lost 0–1. He also started in the Kolkata Derby in the 2019–20 Calcutta Premier Division. He came on as a substitute against Kalighat MS in the second half and provided a brilliant assist with the outside of his foot for Jaime Santos Colado to score and ensure the win for East Bengal FC. He is a part of the squad to play the 2019-20 I-League. He was released in January 2020.

=== FC Bengaluru United ===
Bengaluru United have signed Ronaldo Oliveira on a free transfer

== Career statistics ==
=== Club ===
As of 13 October 2021

Club	Season	League			Cup		Other		AFC		Total	
Club	Season	Division	Apps	Goals	Apps	Goals	Apps	Goals	Apps	Goals	Apps	Goals
East Bengal	2019–20	I-League	4	0	0	0	8 (Note: Appearance(s) in Calcutta Football League)	0	—		12	0
Kerala Blasters B	2020	I-League 2nd Division	5	4	0	0	—		—		5	4
Bengaluru United	2020	I-League 2nd Division	4	0	0	0	—		—		4	0
Bengaluru United	2021	I-League 2nd Division	3	0	4 (Note: Appearance(s) in Durand Cup)	0	—		—		7	0
Bengaluru United	Bengaluru United total		7	0	4	0	0	0	0	0	11	0
RoundGlass Punjab	2022–23	I-League	0	0	0	0	—		—		0	0
Career total			16	4	4	0	8	0	0	0	28	4

== Honours ==
Salgaocar

- Goa Professional League Golden Boot: 2018–19
- AWES Cup runner-up: 2018

Kerala Blasters B

- Kerala Premier League: 2019–20
