= City College, Kolkata =

Government college in Kolkata, West Bengal

City College
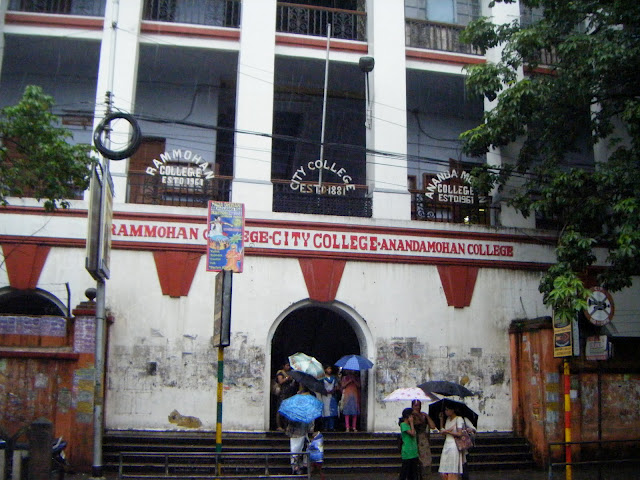
- Front view of City College, Kolkata
- Former name: City School (1879–1881)
- Motto: श्रद्धावान लभते ज्ञानम (Sanskrit)
- Motto in English: The respectful attains knowledge
- Type: Public, Undergraduate co-educational college
- Established: 1881; 145 years ago
- Founder: Anandamohan Bose
- Accreditation: NAAC; UGC
- Affiliations: University of Calcutta
- President: Dr. Subodh Chandra Sarkar
- Principal: Dr. Sital Prasad Chattopadhyay
- Location: 102/1, Raja Rammohan Sarani, College Street, Kolkata, West Bengal, 700009
- Campus: Urban
- Language: English, Bengali, Hindi
- Colours: Red and White
- Website: www.citycollegekolkata.org

City College is a composite state government–aided public college, affiliated to the University of Calcutta. It offers undergraduate-level courses in various arts, commerce and science subjects.

== History ==
Anandamohan Bose, founder of the City College, Kolkata, was a supporter of the Brahmo religion during his student life. In 1869, he officially adopted the Brahmo religion along with his wife Swarnaprabha Devi (sister of Jagadish Chandra Bose). However, young members of Brahmo Samaj (followers of the Brahmo religion) differed with Keshab Chandra Sen (founder of the Brahmo religion) regarding matters like child marriage, running of the Brahmo Samaj and various other matters. Because of this difference, younger members of this society like Anandamohan Bose, Shibnath Shastri, Sib Chandra Deb, Umesh Chandra Dutta, etc. established the Sadharan Brahmo Samaj in 1878. On 27 April 1879, Anandamohan Bose, first president of the Sadharan Brahmo Samaj, founded the Chhatrasamaj, the student's wing of the Sadharan Brahmo Samaj movement. In 1879–81, he established the City College, Calcutta, as an initiative by the Sadharan Brahmo Samaj movement.

The college started its journey with the Law department. In 1884, this college was elevated to a first-grade degree college. By the year 1920, the college began offering different undergraduate (BA/B.Sc) degree courses in arts and science. The college opened the Commerce Department in 1939, thereby becoming the largest college in Asia. Later, in 1943, the Women's Department was inaugurated.

It is one of the heritage institutions of Kolkata and played a prominent role in the wake of the Bengal Renaissance of the nineteenth century. The college is located at 102/1, Raja Rammohan Roy Sarani (Amherst Street), Kolkata-700009. It shares premises with Rammohan College (morning college) and Anandamohan College (evening college).

In 1961, the branches of City College split into separate colleges as instructed by the University Grants Commission. While the original college retained the original name “City College”, the branches were named Rammohan College, Ananda Mohan College, Umesh Chandra College, City College of Commerce and Business Administration, Sivanath Sastri College, Heramba Chandra College, and Prafulla Chandra College. Together, they are referred to as City group of college (Kolkata).

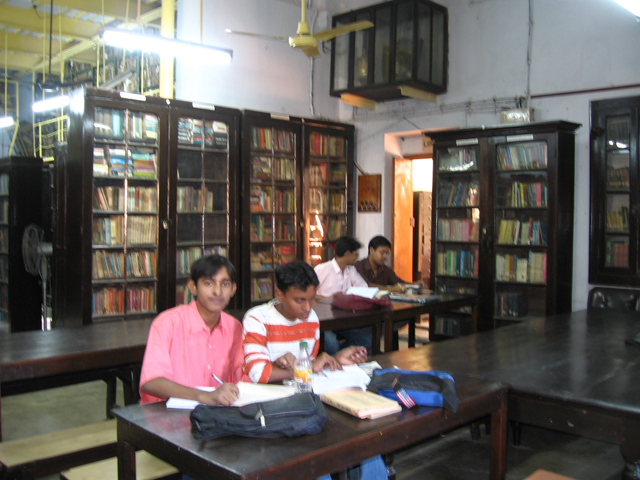
City College library room

== Disaster ==
On February 11, 2018, a bomb exploded in the City College hostel leaving a boy critically injured. The hostel is situated beside the college and has been abandoned since 2003.

== In popular culture ==
- City College was featured in Satyajit Ray's 1956 drama film Aparajito
- A part of the Bengali action film Mahan (1996), directed by Haranath Chakraborty were shot at City College.

== Departments and courses ==
The college offers different undergraduate and postgraduate courses and aims at imparting education to the undergraduates and postgraduates of upper-, lower- and middle-class people of Kolkata and its adjoining areas.

=== Science ===
Science faculty consists of the departments of Chemistry, Physics, Mathematics, Botany, Zoology, Physiology, and Economics.

=== Arts & Commerce ===
Arts and Commerce faculty consists of departments of Bengali, English, Sanskrit, History, Political Science, Philosophy, and Commerce.

== Accreditation ==
The City College, Kolkata is recognized by the University Grants Commission (UGC).

The college was accredited by the National Assessment and Accreditation Council (NAAC) in 2007, and awarded a B+ grade. In 2024, the college was re-accredited by the National Assessment and Accreditation Council (NAAC) and awarded a B grade.

== Notable former principals ==
- Krishna Bose, an Indian politician, educator, author and social worker.

== Notable alumni ==
- Swami Shuddhananda, former president of the Ramakrishna Mission
- Swami Prajnanananda, President Ramakrishna Vedanta Math
- Soumitra Chatterjee, actor
- Vikram Chatterjee, actor
- Laxminath Bezbarua, Assamese writer and poet
- Budhindranath Delihial Bhattacharya, lexicographer, author, dramatist and tea planter
- Barun Sengupta, founder and editor of Bartaman newspaper
- Shakti Chattopadhyay, poet
- Haradhan Bandopadhyay, actor
- Subhankar Chattopadhyay, Indian Filmmaker, Scriptwriter, Creator of Non Fiction shows.
- Mohit Chattopadhyay, playwright, screenwriter
- Muhammad Shahidullah, linguist
- Rajanikanta Sen, poet, composer
- Samir Roychoudhury, poet, writer
- Satyendra Chandra Mitra, freedom fighter, politician
- Sunil Kanti Roy, managing director of Peerless Group and Padma Shri awardee
- Birendra Nath Mallick, neurobiologist, Shanti Swarup Bhatnagar laureate
- Bankim Ghosh, Bengali actor and theatre personality
- Jibanananda Das, Bengali poet and writer
- Bhaskar Saha, immunologist, Shanti Swarup Bhatnagar laureate
- Pran Ranjan Sengupta, mathematician and scientist
- Akhil Niyogi, Bengali writer and editor

== Notable faculty ==
- Jibanananda Das
- Chidananda Dasgupta
- Mahendranath Ray
- Shankha Ghosh
- Bratya Basu
- Subodh Sarkar

== See also ==
- List of colleges affiliated to the University of Calcutta
- Education in India
- Education in West Bengal
