= 2019 CFL Premier Division =

122nd season of Calcutta Premier Division

CFL Premier Division
- Season: 2019–20
- Champions: Peerless (1st title)
- Matches: 129
- Goals: 309 (2.4 per match)

The 2019 Calcutta Football League Premier Division was the 122nd season of the top state-level football league within the Indian state of West Bengal. The season kicked off on 26 July 2019. It had two sub-divisions: CFL Premier Division A and CFL Premier Division B.

Peerless scripted history as they become the only club outside the Big Three—Mohun Bagan, East Bengal, & Mohammedan—to win the Championship in 61 years. Eastern Railway did the same back in 1958.

== Premier Division A ==
CFL Premier Division A
- Season: 2019–20
- Dates: 26 July – 3 October
- Champions: Peerless SC (1st title)
- Relegated: Kalighat MS; NBP Rainbow
- Matches: 65
- Goals: 177 (2.72 per match)
- Top goalscorer: Ansumana Kromah (13 Goals)
- Highest scoring: Bhawanipore 6–2 NBP Rainbow
- Highest attendance: 65,000 (East Bengal vs Mohun Bagan)
- All statistics correct as of 26 February 2021. Fixtures

=== Managers and foreign players ===
Team	Manager	Player 1	Player 2	Player 3	Player 4	Player 5	Player 6
Aryan	(India) Raajdeep Nandy	(Ivory Coast) Gatch Arthure Diomande	(Nigeria) Ejiogu Emmanual	(Nigeria) Ademola Kuti	(Ivory Coast) Seydoumady Kourouma		
Bhawanipore	(India) Sankarlal Chakraborty	(Ivory Coast) Kamo Stephane Bayi	(Ivory Coast) Léonce Dodoz	(Zimbabwe) Victor Kamhuka			
BSS	(India) Goutam Ghosh	(Nigeria) Waheed Adekunle	(Ghana) William Opoku	(Ghana) Bright Middleton Mends	(Ghana) Daniel Addo		
Calcutta Customs	(India) Rajeev Dey	(Nigeria) Eze Stanley Ifeanyi	(Nigeria) Emmanuel Chigozie	(Ghana) Philip Adjah Teteh	(Ghana) John Ampong		
East Bengal	(Spain) Alejandro Menéndez	(Spain) Marcos de la Espada	(Senegal) Kassim Aidara	(Spain) Jaime Colado	(Spain) Martí Crespí	(Spain) Juan Mera	(Spain) Borja Gómez Pérez
George Telegraph	(India) Ranjan Bhattacharya	(Nigeria) Joel Sunday	(Nigeria) Justice Morgan	(Nigeria) Echezona Anyichie			
Kalighat M.S.	(India) Anup Nag	(Ivory Coast) Alexander Kouame	(Ivory Coast) Lanssini Karamoko	(Afghanistan) Ismail Aseel			
Mohammedan	(Nigeria) Shaheed Ramon	(Ivory Coast) Arthur Kouassi	(Uganda) Musa Mudde	(Nigeria) Kareem Omolaja	(Nigeria) John Chidi		
Mohun Bagan	(Spain) Kibu Vicuña	(Spain) Fran Morante	(Spain) Salva Chamorro	(Spain) Fran Gonzalez	(Spain) Joseba Beitia	(Trinidad and Tobago) Daneil Cyrus	(Spain) Julen Colinas
Peerless	(India) Jahar Das	(Liberia) Ansumana Kromah	(Trinidad and Tobago) Anthony Wolfe	(Liberia) Varney Kallon	(Ghana) Edmond Peprah		
Rainbow	(India) Saumik Dey	(Nigeria) Kazeem Bolaji	(Nigeria) Richard Agwu Somtochukwu	(Nigeria) Felix Chidi Odili			
Southern Samity	(India) Mehtab Hossain	(Ghana) Samuel Kane	(Syria) Mahmoud Amnah	(Nigeria) Ogba Kalu Nnanna			

=== Venues ===
- Kolkata
1. Vivekananda Yuba Bharati Krirangan
2. Mohun Bagan Ground
3. East Bengal Ground
4. Mohammedan Ground
5. Rabindra Sarobar Stadium
- Kalyani
1. Kalyani Stadium
2. Gayeshpur Stadium
- Barasat
1. Vidyasagar Krirangan

=== Standings ===
Pos	Team	Pld	W	D	L	GF	GA	GD	Pts	Qualification or relegation
1	Peerless	11	7	2	2	24	11	+13	23	Champions
2	Mohun Bagan	11	6	2	3	20	10	+10	20	
3	East Bengal	11	6	2	3	17	13	+4	20 (Note: The game between East Bengal and Calcutta Customs was rescheduled due to unplayable weather & ground conditions, however on the later date East Bengal did not turn up & thus Customs were awarded a 3-0 win.)	
4	Mohammedan	11	5	4	2	16	13	+3	19	Qualified for I-League Qualifiers
5	Bhawanipore	11	5	2	4	20	14	+6	17	Qualified for I-League Qualifiers
6	BSS Sporting Club	11	5	2	4	13	14	−1	17	
7	George Telegraph	11	5	1	5	12	14	−2	16	
8	Calcutta Customs	11	3	5	3	16	14	+2	14	
9	Southern Samity	11	2	6	3	11	13	−2	12	
10	Aryan	11	2	3	6	13	22	−9	9	
11	Kalighat M.S.	11	2	2	7	13	24	−11	8	Relegation to Premier Division B
12	Rainbow	11	1	3	7	5	18	−13	6	Relegation to Premier Division B

=== Results ===
Home \ Away	ARN	BFC	BSS	CCU	EB	GTL	KMS	MM	MB	PRL	RAC	SOU
Aryan	—	1–4	1–2	0–2	0–3	1–2	2–2	1–1	2–1	4–3	0–1	1–1
Bhawanipore		—	0–1	1–1	2–2	0–2	2–1	3–0	0–2	0–2	6–2	2–0
BSS			—	2–1	1–2	2–0	3–2	0–1	1–2	0–4	0–0	1–1
Calcutta Customs				—	w/o	3–2	1–2	1–1	1–1	2–2	1–1	0–2
East Bengal					—	0–1	4–2	3–2	0–0	0–1	1–0	2–1
George Telegraph						—	1–0	1–2	0–4	0–2	3–0	0–0
Kalighat MS							—	1–3	0–3	1–4	2–1	0–0
Mohammedan								—	3–2	2–0	0–0	1–1
Mohun Bagan									—	0–3	1–0	4–0
Peerless										—	1–0	2–2
Rainbow											—	0–3
Southern Samity												—

Legend: Blue = home team win; Yellow = draw; Red = away team win.

=== Top goal scorers ===
Rank	Player	Club	Goals
1	(Liberia) Ansumana Kromah	Peerless	13
2	(India) Akhil Verma	Bhawanipore	9
3	(Spain) Jaime Colado	East Bengal	7

== Premier Division B ==
CFL Premier Division B
- Season: 2019
- Champions: United SC
- Promoted: United; Railway; Tollygunge Agragami; Kidderpore
- Relegated: SAI (East Zone); SAIL
- Matches: 64
- Goals: 132 (2.06 per match)
- Highest scoring: Pathachakra 5–1 SAIL
- All statistics correct as of 27 February 2021. Fixtures

=== Standings ===
Pos	Team	Pld	W	D	L	GF	GA	GD	Pts	Qualification or relegation
1	United (C)	14	8	4	2	22	11	+11	28	Promotion to Premier Division A
2	Railways	14	6	4	4	15	14	+1	22	Promotion to Premier Division A
3	Tollygunge Agragami	14	5	6	3	15	12	+3	21	Promotion to Premier Division A
4	Kidderpore	14	6	3	5	12	12	0	21	Promotion to Premier Division A
5	Eastern Railway	13	5	3	5	17	14	+3	18	Championship Round
6	West Bengal Police	13	5	2	6	14	16	−2	17	Championship Round
7	FCI (East Zone)	12	5	3	4	8	7	+1	18	Relegation Round
8	Pathachakra	12	5	0	7	17	16	+1	15	Relegation Round
9	SAI (East Zone)	11	2	3	6	6	9	−3	9	Relegation to First Division
10	SAIL	11	2	2	7	6	20	−14	8	Relegation to First Division

(C) Champions
- Matches into Championship & Relegation Round.
