= Sunil Kanti Roy =

Indian entrepreneur (1944–2022)

- Born: 8 January 1944; Calcutta, Bengal Presidency, British Raj
- Died: 8 May 2022 (aged 78); Kolkata, West Bengal, India
- Other name: S. K. Roy
- Education: City College, Kolkata
- Occupations: Entrepreneur, business person
- Known for: Managing Director of Peerless Group
- Awards: Padma Shri

Sunil Kanti Roy (8 January 1944 – 8 May 2022), better known as S. K. Roy, was an Indian entrepreneur and business person who was the managing director of Peerless Group, a Kolkata-based conglomerate, which had interests in finance, healthcare, insurance, automobiles and securities.

An alumnus of the City College, Kolkata, he took over the responsibilities from his elder brother, B. K. Roy, after his death, as the managing director of the Group in 1985. He was one among the high-net-worth individuals from West Bengal.

== Early years ==
He was born on 8 January 1944 in Calcutta to Radhashyam Roy.

== Career ==
He was the founder of the residuary non-banking company (RNBC), Peerless Group, Roy served as the Managing Director of The Peerless General Finance and Investment Company and chaired the Peerless Developers Limited, Peerless Hotels Limited, Kaizen Hotels and Resorts Limited.

He also sat on the board of directors of Peerless Hospitex Hospital and Research Centre Limited, Bengal Peerless Housing Development Limited, Peerless Securities Limited and Peerless Financial Services Limited and has served as a member of the director board of West Bengal Industrial Development Corporation. He was an incumbent member of the Federation of Indian Chambers of Commerce & Industry (FICCI) as well as the Bengal Chamber of Commerce and Industry (BCCI) at their executive committees. The Government of India awarded him the fourth highest civilian honour of the Padma Shri, in 2009, for his contributions to society.

== Death ==
Roy died in Kolkata on 8 May 2022, at the age of 78.

== See also ==
- Peerless Group
- City College, Kolkata
