= Tondomba Singh Naorem =

Indian footballer

Tondomba Singh
Personal information
- Full name: Tondomba Singh Naorem
- Date of birth: 1 February 1999 (age 27)
- Place of birth: Tentha, Manipur, India
- Position: Defensive midfielder

Team information
- Current team: Rajasthan United

Youth career
- Shillong Lajong
- KLASA
- NEROCA

Senior career*
Years	Team	Apps	(Gls)
2018–2019	NEROCA	13	(0)
2019–2020	East Bengal	8	(0)
2020–2024	Mumbai City	0	(0)
2020–2021	→ Sudeva Delhi (loan)	7	(0)
2022–2023	→ NEROCA (loan)	15	(0)
2023–2024	→ Delhi (loan)	15	(1)
2024–2025	Delhi	12	(0)
2025–	Rajasthan United	0	(0)
- * Club domestic league appearances and goals as of 21:52, 5 April 2025 (UTC)

Tondomba Singh Naorem (Meitei: Naorem Tondomba Singh, born 1 February 1999) is an Indian professional footballer who plays as a defensive midfielder for I-League club Rajasthan United.

== Career ==
Tondomba hails from Tentha, a small village in Thoubal district in Manipur. The midfielder started playing football at very early, like all other children from his state.

At youth level, Tondomba played for the Shillong Lajong Youth Academy and then the NEROCA FC U-18. He left for Manipur State League side KLASA before returning to the senior team of NEROCA.

On 27 October 2018, Tondomba made his professional debut in NEROCA home game against East Bengal. The midfielder played a pivotal role in NEROCA's 2018–19 I-League campaign. His creativity in the midfield, passing ability and wing-play suited to the style of their former coach Manuel Retamero Fraile.

On 17 May 2019, Tondomba joined East Bengal on a four-year deal.

=== NEROCA ===
In July 2022, Tondomba returned to I-League club NEROCA on loan from Indian Super League club Mumbai City. On 18 August, he made his return debut in the Imphal Derby against TRAU in the Durand Cup, which ended in a 3–1 win. He was awarded Player of the Match.

== Career statistics ==
=== Club ===
As of 5 April 2025

Club	Season	League			Cup		AFC		Total	
Club	Season	Division	Apps	Goals	Apps	Goals	Apps	Goals	Apps	Goals
NEROCA	2018–19	I-League	13	0	0	0	—		13	0
East Bengal	2019–20	I-League	8	0	1 (Note: Appearance(s) in Durand Cup)	0	—		9	0
Mumbai City	2021–22	Indian Super League	0	0	0	0	—		0	0
Sudeva Delhi (loan)	2020–21	I-League	7	0	0	0	—		7	0
NEROCA (loan)	2022–23	I-League	15	0	4	0	—		19	0
Delhi (loan)	2023–24	I-League	15	1	1	0	—		16	1
Delhi	2024–25	I-League	12	0	0	0	—		12	0
Rajasthan United	2025–26	I-League	0	0	0	0	—		0	0
Career total			70	1	6	0	0	0	76	1
