= Pran Ranjan Sengupta =

Indian mathematician

Pran Ranjan Sengupta (28 August 1938 ― 21 May 2005) alias P. R. Sengupta was an eminent Bengali Mathematician and Scientist.

== Early life ==
Sengupta was born in Barisal in British India. He passed matriculation in 1951 and I.Sc. in 1953. He completed B.Sc. from City College, Kolkata in 1956 and M.Sc. in 1959 from Calcutta University. In 1963, Sengupta acquired Ph.D. from Jadavpur University. He completed D.Sc. from Kalyani University and joined at Kalyani University in 1966 as a teacher in the Department of Mathematics.

== Career ==
Sengupta worked in the field of continuum mechanics. He published more than one thousand research papers in national and international journals as an active guide of Ph.D. scholars. He was a fellow of the National Academy of Sciences, India and Institute of Mathematics and its Applications. He became the President of Mathematics Section of Indian Science Congress Association in 1981 and 1996. He founded the Institute of Mechanics of Continua and Mathematical Sciences in 2004.
