= Monotosh Chakladar =

Indian footballer (born 1998)

Personal information
- Date of birth: 4 April 1998 (age 28)
- Place of birth: Chuchura, West Bengal, India
- Height: 1.80 m (5 ft 11 in)
- Positions: Center-back; left back

Team information
- Current team: East Bengal Reserves
- Number: 63

Youth career
- –2016: United SC

Senior career*
Years	Team	Apps	(Gls)
2016–2017	United SC	10	(1)
2017–2018	Mohammedan	2	(0)
2018–2021	Pathachakra		
2018–2019	→ Gokulam Kerala (loan)	4	(0)
2019	→ Peerless (loan)		
2020	→ East Bengal (loan)	1	(0)
2020	→ Bhawanipore (loan)	4	(0)
2021	→ Bengaluru United (loan)		
2021	Peerless		
2021–2022	Madan Maharaj	6	(0)
2022–2023	Chennaiyin	1	(0)
2023–2024	Diamond Harbour	2	(0)
2024	→ United SC (loan)	12	(0)
2024-	East Bengal	18	(0)
- * Club domestic league appearances and goals

Monotosh Chakladar (Bengali: মনোতোষ চাকলাদার; born 4 April 1998) is an Indian professional footballer who plays as a defender.

== Club career ==
Monotosh started his career with the youth academy of United SC. He joined Kolkata giants Mohammedan in 2018 and played in the 2017–18 I-League 2nd Division.

He joined Pathachakra in 2018 and played in the 2018–19 Calcutta Premier Division.

=== Gokulam Kerala ===
His good showing for Pathachakra in the 2018–19 Calcutta Premier Division, earned him a loan spell at I-League club Gokulam Kerala.

On 31 October, he made his debut for the club against NEROCA in a 1–1 stalemate. He finished the season with four matches for the Malabarians as they finished 10th in the league table.

=== Peerless ===
He returned from the loan and joined Peerless and won the 2019–20 Calcutta Premier Division.

=== East Bengal ===
In January 2020, Monotosh signed for I-League club and Kolkata giants East Bengal on loan for the remainder of the season.

He made his only appearance for the club, on 17 February against Indian Arrows, coming on as a 87th-minute substitute for Asheer Akhtar in a 3–1 win.

=== Chennaiyin ===
On 4 June 2022, Chennaiyin confirmed the signing of Monotosh ahead of the upcoming Indian Super League season.

== Career statistics ==
=== Club ===
As of 20 August 2022

Club	Season	League			Cup		AFC		Total	
Club	Season	Division	Apps	Goals	Apps	Goals	Apps	Goals	Apps	Goals
Mohammedan	2017–18	I-League 2nd Division	2	0	0	0	—		2	0
Gokulam Kerala (loan)	2018–19	I-League	4	0	0	0	—		4	0
East Bengal (loan)	2019–20	I-League	1	0	0	0	—		1	0
Bhawanipore (loan)	2020	I-League 2nd Division	4	0	0	0	—		4	0
Madan Maharaj	2021	I-League 2nd Division	6	0	0	0	—		6	0
Chennaiyin	2022–23	Indian Super League	0	0	1 (Note: Appearance(s) in Durand Cup)	0	—		1	0
Career total			17	0	1	0	0	0	18	0

== Honours ==
Peerless

- Calcutta Football League: 2019–20
