= Prakash Sarkar =

Indian footballer (born 1997)

Personal information
- Date of birth: 15 February 1997 (age 29)
- Place of birth: Ashoknagar Kalyangarh, West Bengal, India
- Position: Right back

Team information
- Current team: Delhi

Youth career
- 2014–2016: Pune
- 2016–2017: East Bengal

Senior career*
Years	Team	Apps	(Gls)
2017–2021	East Bengal	12	(0)
2021	Calcutta Customs		
2021	Peerless		
2021–2022	Real Kashmir	13	(0)
2022–2023	Bhawanipore		
2023–	Delhi	0	(0)
- * Club domestic league appearances and goals as of 23:33, 15 March 2022 (UTC)

Prakash Sarkar (Bengali: প্রকাশ সরকার; born 15 February 1997) is an Indian professional footballer who plays as a defender for I-League club Delhi.

== Career ==
Prakash Sarkar started his career with the youth academy of Pune FC under then coach Ranjan Chowdhury and participated in the 2015–16 I-League U18 and reached the final round. In 2016–17, he joined East Bengal FC and played for the East Bengal FC U-18 side, again under Ranjan Chowdhury, which became runners-up in the 2016–17 I-League U18.

=== East Bengal FC ===
==== 2017-18 ====
In 2017–18, under coach Khalid Jamil, Prakash Sarkar after his excellent performance for the East Bengal FC U-18 side, was promoted to the senior squad and he made his debut in the Calcutta Football League going on to make 5 appearances in total. His I-League debut came in the 2017–18 I-League on 22 December 2017, away against Chennai City F.C. which East Bengal FC won 1–2. He made 9 appearances in the 2017-18 I-League season, playing as a defensive midfield as East Bengal finished 4th. He was also a part of the East Bengal team, that became runners-up in the 2018 Indian Super Cup held at Bhubaneshwar as East Bengal FC lost 1–4 to Bengaluru FC in the final. Prakash Sarkar, however, did not play any of the matches and remained on the bench throughout the campaign.

==== 2018-19 ====
In 2018–19, under coach Alejandro Menendez, Prakash Sarkar did not get as much chance as he got in the previous season with just 3 appearances from the bench in the 2018-19 I-League, the season went very lack-lusture for the defensive midfielder.

==== 2019-20 ====
At the start of 2019–20 season, Prakash Sarkar signed a 3 years contract extension with East Bengal FC. He has played 2 games this season, with 1 appearance in 2019 Durand Cup. Coach Alejandro Menendez has been trying him as a centre-back in the pre-season before the 2019-20 I-League.

== Career statistics ==
=== Club ===
As of 4 May 2022

Club	Season	League			Cup		Continental		Other		Total	
Club	Season	Division	Apps	Goals	Apps	Goals	Apps	Goals	Apps	Goals	Apps	Goals
East Bengal	2017–18	I-League	9	0	0	0	–		5 (Note: Appearance(s) in Calcutta Football League)	0	14	0
East Bengal	2018–19	I-League	3	0	–		–		3	0	3	0
East Bengal	2019–20	I-League	0	0	1 (Note: Appearance(s) in Durand Cup)	0	–		1	0	2	0
East Bengal	Total		12	0	1	0	0	0	9	0	22	0
Real Kashmir	2021–22	I-League	13	0	–		–		–		13	0
Delhi	2023–24	I-League	0	0	0	0	–		–		0	0
Career total			25	0	1	0	0	0	9	0	35	0

== Honours ==
East Bengal

- Indian Super Cup runner-up: 2018

Real Kashmir

- IFA Shield: 2021
