= Víctor Pérez (footballer) =

Spanish footballer

Personal information
- Full name: Víctor Pérez Alonso
- Date of birth: 12 January 1988 (age 38)
- Place of birth: Albacete, Spain
- Height: 1.76 m (5 ft 9 in)
- Position: Defensive midfielder

Youth career
- Real Madrid
- Getafe

Senior career*
Years	Team	Apps	(Gls)
2006–2007	Getafe B		
2007–2008	Alcorcón B		
2008–2009	Alcorcón	37	(6)
2009–2011	Huesca	44	(2)
2011–2017	Valladolid	87	(11)
2014–2015	→ Levante (loan)	5	(0)
2015	→ Chicago Fire (loan)	1	(0)
2015–2016	→ Córdoba (loan)	23	(1)
2016–2017	→ Alcorcón (loan)	30	(1)
2017–2018	Wisła Kraków	12	(1)
2018	Bengaluru	1	(0)
2019–2020	Žalgiris	21	(2)
2020	East Bengal	4	(2)
2021	El Ejido	15	(2)
2022–2023	Atlètic d'Escaldes	36	(6)
- * Club domestic league appearances and goals as of 19:51, 19 June 2023 (UTC)

Víctor Pérez Alonso (born 12 January 1988) is a Spanish professional footballer who plays as a defensive midfielder.

== Club career ==
Born in Albacete, Castilla–La Mancha, Pérez played his first seasons as a senior in the Community of Madrid, representing amateurs Getafe CF B and AD Alcorcón B. In the 2008–09 season, he competed in the Segunda División B with the latter's first team.

In summer 2009, Pérez moved to Segunda División with SD Huesca. He played his first game as a professional on 2 September in a 0–0 away draw against Levante UD in the Copa del Rey, and scored his first league goal on 5 December of that year in the 2–1 home victory over Rayo Vallecano.

Pérez signed up for three years for a fellow league club, Real Valladolid, in July 2011. He appeared in 44 matches in all competitions in his debut campaign, adding seven goals as the Castile and León side returned to La Liga after two years.

Pérez debuted in the top flight on 20 August 2012, playing the full 90 minutes in a 1–0 win at Real Zaragoza. He scored four goals during the season to help the team rank in 14th position and thus escape relegation, all from penalties.

In the 2014 off-season, following Valladolid's relegation, Pérez renewed his contract for a further three years and was loaned to top-division club Levante until June 2016. On 31 January 2015, however, his loan was cancelled.

On 27 March 2015, Pérez transferred to the Chicago Fire FC on loan until June. He only played two minutes in the Major League Soccer, against Toronto FC, being released subsequently.

Pérez moved to Córdoba CF in the Spanish second tier in July 2015, in a season-long loan deal. On 19 August 2016, he returned to his former team Alcorcón after agreeing to a one-year loan contract.

On 9 September 2017, Pérez joined Wisła Kraków in the Polish Ekstraklasa. On 2 March of the following year, he moved to the Indian Super League with Bengaluru FC on a short-term deal.

In January 2019, Pérez signed with Lithuanian club FK Žalgiris. He left 12 months later and, on 12 February 2020, joined I-League club East Bengal Club as a replacement for his compatriot Martí Crespí.

Pérez returned to Spain and its division three in January 2021, with the 33-year-old moving to CD El Ejido. Thirteen months later, he signed for Atlètic Club d'Escaldes in the Andorran Primera Divisió.

== Career statistics ==
As of the match played on 9 March 2020

Club	Season	League			National cup (Note: Includes Copa del Rey, Polish Cup, Super Cup, Lithuanian Cup)		Continental		Total	
Club	Season	Division	Apps	Goals	Apps	Goals	Apps	Goals	Apps	Goals
Alcorcón	2008–09	Segunda División B	32	6	0	0	5 (Note: Appearances in promotion play-offs)	0	37	6
Huesca	2009–10	Segunda División	27	2	2	0	—		29	2
Huesca	2009–10	Segunda División	17	0	1	0	—		18	0
Huesca	Total		44	2	3	0	—		47	2
Valladolid	2011–12	Segunda División	39	6	1	1	4	0	44	7
Valladolid	2012–13	La Liga	25	4	1	0	—		26	4
Valladolid	2013–14	La Liga	19	1	1	0	—		20	1
Valladolid	Total		83	11	3	1	4	0	90	12
Levante (loan)	2014–15	La Liga	5	0	3	0	—		8	0
Chicago Fire (loan)	2015	Major League Soccer	1	0	0	0	—		1	0
Córdoba (loan)	2015–16	Segunda División	21	1	1	0	2	0	24	1
Alcorcón (loan)	2016–17	Segunda División	30	1	3	0	—		33	1
Wisła Kraków	2017–18	Ekstraklasa	12	1	1	0	—		13	1
Bengaluru	2017–18	Indian Super League	1	0	4	0	6 (Note: Appearances in AFC Cup)	0	11	0
Žalgiris	2019	A Lyga	21	2	3	0	—		24	2
East Bengal	2019–20	I-League	4	2	0	0	—		4	2
Career total			254	26	21	1	17	0	292	27

== Honours ==
Bengaluru

- Super Cup: 2018

Atlètic d'Escaldes

- Primera Divisió: 2022–23
- Copa Constitució: 2022
