= Bidyashagar Singh Khangembam =

Indian footballer (born 1998)

Bidyashagar Singh
Personal information
- Full name: Bidyashagar Singh Khangembam
- Date of birth: 11 March 1998 (age 28)
- Place of birth: Samaram Mayai Leikai, Manipur, India
- Height: 1.73 m (5 ft 8 in)
- Position: Striker

Team information
- Current team: Namdhari
- Number: 37

Youth career
- 2016–2017: East Bengal

Senior career*
Years	Team	Apps	(Gls)
2017–2020	East Bengal	29	(9)
2020–2021	TRAU	15	(12)
2021–2023	Bengaluru	12	(3)
2022–2023	→ Kerala Blasters (loan)	6	(0)
2023–2024	Kerala Blasters	1	(0)
2024	Punjab	3	(0)
2024–2025	Inter Kashi	16	(2)
2025–2026	Bhawanipore	12	(9)
2026–	Namdhari	1	(0)
- * Club domestic league appearances and goals as of 15:52, 19 March 2026 (UTC)

Bidyashagar Singh Khangembam (Meitei: Khangembam Bidyashagar Singh, born 11 March 1998) is an Indian professional footballer who plays as a forward for Indian Football League club Namdhari.

== Club career ==
Bidyashagar is a product of East Bengal's youth system. He was part of East Bengal U18 squad that had narrowly lost in the final of the 2016–17 I-League U18. He scored a total of 6 goals in the competition, which includes a goal each against Salgaocar in the semi-final and AIFF Academy in the final. He represented West Bengal in the 2017–18 Santosh Trophy. He scored 4 goals in the tournament.

In August 2017, he was promoted into the senior squad for 2017–18 Calcutta Premier Division. Bidyasagar made his professional debut for East Bengal on 27 October 2018, in an I-League match against NEROCA, replacing goalscorer Enrique Esqueda for the final 2 minutes of a 0–2 victory at the Khuman Lampak Main Stadium.

=== TRAU ===
On 9 July 2020, Bidyashagar signed for I-League club TRAU for the 2020–21 I-League season. Bidayashagar made his debut appearance for the club in I-League on 10 January 2020 against Real Kashmir which ended in 1–1 draw. On 24 January 2021, Bidyashagar scored his first goal against Chennai City which ended 2–0 in favour of the Trau FC. He scored his next goal against Churchill Brothers on 29 January 2021 which ended in a 1–1 draw. On 24 February, Bidyashagar scored a brace against Indian Arrows.

He is the second only Indian player to score double hat tricks in a single season, by doing so in a match against Mohammedan and Real Kashmir during the 2020–21 I-League. He ended the season scoring 12 goals, and 1 assist from 15 matches. He was also the top goalscorer in the 2020–21 I-League season. Thus also becoming the fourth Indian player to finish as top scorer in a National League of the country after Bhaichung Bhutia, Raman Vijayan and Sunil Chhetri.

He left the club the season later, and joined the Indian Super League side Bengaluru FC.

=== Bengaluru ===
On 28 July 2021, it was announced that Bidyashagar was signed by the Indian Super League club Bengaluru FC on a three-year deal. On 15 August 2021, he debuted for the club in a 1–0 win against Maldivian side Club Eagles in 2021 AFC Cup qualifying play-offs.

=== Kerala Blasters FC ===
On 17 August 2022, Kerala Blasters FC announced the signing of Bidyashagar Singh on loan from Bengaluru FC until the end of season. He made his Kerala Blasters debut on 7 October against East Bengal in a 3–1 win by coming as a substitute for Puitea in the 77th minute. He also provided an assist in that game for Ivan Kalyuzhnyi in 81st minute.

Bidyashagar played his first match of the 2023–24 season against Gokulam Kerala FC in the 2023 Durand Cup on 13 August 2023 as a substitute for the goal-scorer Justine Emmanuel, but they lost the match 3–4 at full-time. On 21 August, Bidyashagar scored his first goal for the Blasters and completed his hat-trick against Indian Air Force, helping in a 5–0 victory. He became the first Indian player to score a hat-trick for the Blasters in a major competition and the first hat-trick scorer for the Blasters in the Durand Cup.

=== Punjab FC ===
On 31 January 2024 Bidyashagar joined Punjab FC from Kerala Blasters FC on a permanent deal.

== Career statistics ==
=== Club ===
As of matched played till 10 April 2024

Club	Season	League			Super Cup		Continental		Other		Total	
Club	Season	Division	Apps	Goals	Apps	Goals	Apps	Goals	Apps	Goals	Apps	Goals
East Bengal	2018–19	I-League	6	1	0	0	–	–	6 (Note: Appearances in the 2018–19 Calcutta Premier Division)	0	12	1
East Bengal	2019–20	I-League	5	0	0	0	–		12 (Note: Four appearances in the 2019 Durand Cup) (Note: Appearances in the 2019–20 Calcutta Premier Division)	8 (Note: Five goals in 2019 Durand Cup)	17	8
East Bengal	Total		11	1	0	0	0	0	18	8	29	9
TRAU	2020–21	I-League	15	12	0	0	–	–	–	–	15	12
Bengaluru	2021–22	Indian Super League	3	0	0	0	4 (Note: Appearances in the 2021 AFC Cup)	2	5 (Note: Appearances in the 2021 Durand Cup)	1	12	3
Kerala Blasters (loan)	2022–23	Indian Super League	6	0	2	0	–	–	0	0	8	0
Kerala Blasters	2023–24	Indian Super League	–	–	–	–	–	–	4	3	4	3
Punjab	2023–24	Indian Super League	3	0	0	0	–	–	0	0	3	0
Career total			38	13	2	0	4	2	27	12	71	27

== Honours ==
Individual

- I-League Golden Boot: 2020–21 (12 Goals with TRAU FC)
- I-League — Hero of the League: 2020–21
