= Abhash Thapa =

Indian footballer (born 1998)

Personal information
- Date of birth: 19 December 1998 (age 27)
- Place of birth: Bandel, West Bengal, India
- Height: 1.70 m (5 ft 7 in)
- Positions: Left back; midfielder

Youth career
- 2012–2016: Mohun Bagan

Senior career*
Years	Team	Apps	(Gls)
2016–2017	Royal Wahingdoh		
2017	Bhawanipore		
2017–2019	Real Kashmir	22	(0)
2019–2020	Hyderabad	0	(0)
2019–2020	→ East Bengal (loan)	8	(0)
2020–2022	Real Kashmir	23	(0)
2022–2024	Mohammedan	7	(0)
2024–2025	Rajasthan United	22	(1)
- * Club domestic league appearances and goals as of 21:33, 6 April 2025 (UTC)

Abhash Thapa (born 19 December 1998) is an Indian professional footballer who plays as a defender or midfielder.

== Club career ==
Abhash started his youth career in Mohammedan U14. In 2012, he moved to Mohun Bagan U18 team and played there for 4 years. In 2016, he joined Royal Wahingdoh, followed by Bhawanipore and played in CFL Premiere Division B. In 2017–18 season, he joined Real Kashmir, which that time played in I-League 2nd Division. That season, he made 7 appearances for Real Kashmir, and got promoted to I-League. In I-League, he made 15 appearances. On 1 September 2019 he got transferred to the new Indian Super League franchise Hyderabad. He couldn't debut in the club. He was loaned to East Bengal on 8 January 2020, till the end of the season.

=== Mohammedan ===
In June 2022, Thapa joined I-League club Mohammedan, on a two-year deal. On 16 August, he made his debut for the club against Goa in the Durand Cup, which ended in a 3–1 comeback win. He assisted Faslu Rahman for their second goal with an inch-perfect cross.

== Career statistics ==
=== Club ===
As of 6 April 2025

Club	Season	League			Cup		Other		AFC		Total	
Club	Season	Division	Apps	Goals	Apps	Goals	Apps	Goals	Apps	Goals	Apps	Goals
Real Kashmir	2017–18	I-League 2nd Division	7	0	0	0	–		–		7	0
Real Kashmir	2018–19	I-League	15	0	1 (Note: Appearance(s) in Super Cup)	0	–		–		16	0
Real Kashmir	Total		22	0	1	0	0	0	0	0	23	0
Hyderabad	2019–20	Indian Super League	0	0	0	0	–		–		0	0
East Bengal (loan)	2019–20	I-League	8	0	0	0	–		–		8	0
Real Kashmir	2020–21	I-League	11	0	0	0	–		–		11	0
Real Kashmir	2021–22	I-League	12	0	0	0	–		–		12	0
Real Kashmir	Total		23	0	0	0	0	0	0	0	23	0
Mohammedan	2022–23	I-League	7	0	6 (Note: Appearance(s) in Durand Cup)	0	4 (Note: Appearance(s) in Calcutta Football League)	0	–		17	0
Mohammedan	2023–24	I-League	0	0	0	0	–		–		0	0
Mohammedan	Total		7	0	6	0	4	0	0	0	17	0
Rajasthan United	2024–25	I-League	22	1	0	0	–		–		22	1
Career total			82	1	7	0	4	0	0	0	93	1

== Honours ==
Real Kashmir

- IFA Shield: 2020
