= Bhaskar Saha =

Indian cell biologist (born 1964)

- Born: 2 January 1964 (age 62); Kolkata, India
- Awards: 2009 Shanti Swarup Bhatnagar Prize
- Scientific career
- Fields: Immunology; Cell biology
- Workplaces: Pune University; Vidyasagar University; National Centre for Cell Science

Bhaskar Saha (born 2 January 1964) is an Indian immunologist, cell biologist and a senior scientist at National Centre for Cell Science, Pune. He is known for his contributions in the fields of immunology and cell signaling . He is an elected fellow of two of the major Indian science academies, National Academy of Sciences, India and Indian Academy of Sciences. The Council of Scientific and Industrial Research, the apex agency of the Government of India for scientific research, awarded him the Shanti Swarup Bhatnagar Prize for Science and Technology, one of the highest Indian science awards, in 2009, for his contributions to biological sciences.

== Biography ==
Bhaskar Saha obtained his PhD from the Indian Institute of Chemical Biology, Calcutta (1993). He did his postdoctoral fellowship at Naval Medical Research Institute and also served as Principal Investigator at NMRI, and Faculty, Dept of Medicine, USUHS, Bethesda, USA (1996–97). He joined the National Centre for Cell Science in 1998, where he serves as a Scientist-G and carries out his research on immunology and cancer biology. His early researches were focused on immunology and he has since shifted his focus to explore that therapeutic uses of his findings. At NCCS, he is involved in five projects viz. Leishmania-macrophage interaction, CD40 signaling, DC subset mediated priming against prostate cancer, Development and regulation of regulatory T cells in leishmaniasis and DC subsets in leishmaniasis and regulation of T cell response. He has published several research articles, reviews and book chapters that could be found in Pubmed. He has also served as a faculty member of Pune University and Vidyasagar University.

Saha, who is known to have a calm and composed personality, was in the news in 2013 when he staged a hunger strike in protest against the mismanagement of research programs at the National Centre for Cell Science. He is married to Ratna, a school teacher at Bharatiya Vidya Bhavan, and the couple has a son, Baibaswata and a daughter, Saptaparnee. The family lives in Pune.

== Awards and honors ==
Saha's contributions to the biological sciences earned him the Shanti Swarup Bhatnagar Prize for Science and Technology of the Council of Scientific and Industrial Research in 2009. He was elected as a fellow by the National Academy of Sciences, India in 2011 and a year later, he became an elected fellow of the Indian Academy of Sciences. He is also a recipient of the National Bioscience Award for Career Development of the Department of Biotechnology in 2007.

== Selected bibliography ==
- Rub, Abdur; Dey, Ranadhir; Jadhav, Meenakshi; Kamat, Rohan; Chakkaramakkil, Santhosh; Majumdar, Subrata; Mukhopadhyaya, Robin; Saha, Bhaskar (8 February 2009). "Cholesterol depletion associated with Leishmania major infection alters macrophage CD40 signalosome composition and effector function". Nature Immunology. 10 (3): 273–280. doi:10.1038/ni.1705. PMID 19198591. S2CID 16404693.
- Mathur RK, Awasthi A, Saha B (March 2006). "The conundrum of CD40 function: host protection or disease promotion?". Trends Parasitol. 22 (3): 117–22. doi:10.1016/j.pt.2006.01.003. PMID 16446115.
- Awasthi A, Mathur RK, Saha B (June 2004). "Immune response to Leishmania infection". Indian J Med Res. 119 (6): 238–58. PMID 15243162.
- Mathur RK, Awasthi A, Wadhone P, Ramanamurthy B, Saha B (May 2004). "Reciprocal CD40 signals through p38MAPK and ERK-1/2 induce counteracting immune responses". Nat. Med. 10 (5): 540–4. doi:10.1038/nm1045. PMID 15107845. S2CID 31967073.

== See also ==
- Immunology
- Cell signaling
- Plasticity (brain)
- Signal transduction
- Shubha Tole
