= Kamalpreet Singh =

Indian footballer (born 1997)

Personal information
- Date of birth: 15 November 1997 (age 28)
- Place of birth: Ludhiana, Punjab, India
- Height: 1.70 m (5 ft 7 in)
- Position: Left back

Team information
- Current team: Real Kashmir
- Number: 22

Youth career
- 2014–2016: AIFF Elite Academy

Senior career*
Years	Team	Apps	(Gls)
2015–2016	Minerva Punjab B	7	(0)
2016–2018	Minerva Punjab	30	(0)
2018–2020	East Bengal	22	(0)
2020–2022	Odisha	4	(0)
2022–	Real Kashmir	2	(0)

International career
- India U16
- India U19
- * Club domestic league appearances and goals as of 22:22, 19 November 2022 (UTC)

Kamalpreet Singh (born 15 November 1997) is an Indian professional footballer who plays as a defender for Real Kashmir in the I-League.

== Career ==
Born in Punjab, Singh began his career at the AIFF Elite Academy where he played along with both the India youth sides.

=== Minerva Punjab ===
Singh was announced to be part of the Minerva Punjab side for the I-League 2nd Division in November 2015. On 8 January 2017, he made his professional debut for the club in the I-League against Chennai City. He started and played the full match as Minerva Punjab drew 0–0.

== International ==
Singh has represented India at both the under-16 and under-19 sides.

== Career statistics ==
=== Club ===
As of 19 November 2022

Club	Season	League			Cup		AFC		Others		Total	
Club	Season	Division	Apps	Goals	Apps	Goals	Apps	Goals	Apps	Goals	Apps	Goals
Minerva; Punjab B	2015–16	I-League 2nd Division	7	0	0	0	—		—		7	0
Minerva Punjab	2016–17	I-League	12	0	0	0	—		—		12	0
Minerva Punjab	2017–18	I-League	18	0	1 (Note: Appearance(s) in Super Cup)	0	—		—		19	0
Minerva Punjab	Minerva total		30	0	1	0	0	0	0	0	31	0
East Bengal	2018–19	I-League	13	0	0	0	—		11 (Note: Appearance(s) in Calcutta Football League)	0	24	0
East Bengal	2019–20	I-League	9	0	3 (Note: Appearance(s) in Durand Cup)	0	—		6	0	18	0
East Bengal	East Bengal total		22	0	3	0	0	0	17	0	42	0
Odisha	2020–21	Indian Super League	4	0	0	0	—		—		4	0
Odisha	2021–22	Indian Super League	0	0	0	0	—		—		0	0
Odisha	Odisha total		4	0	0	0	0	0	0	0	4	0
Real Kashmir	2022–23	I-League	2	0	0	0	—		—		2	0
Career total			65	0	4	0	0	0	17	0	86	0

== Honours ==
Minerva Punjab

- I-League: 2017–18
