= Asheer Akhtar =

Indian footballer (born 1994)

Personal information
- Date of birth: 14 December 1994 (age 31)
- Place of birth: Kamptee, Maharashtra, India
- Positions: Centre-back; right-back

Team information
- Current team: NorthEast United
- Number: 12

Youth career
- Rabbani Club
- 2014–2015: Pune

Senior career*
Years	Team	Apps	(Gls)
2015–2016	Lonestar Kashmir	8	(0)
2016	Salgaocar		
2017	Mumbai	5	(0)
2017–2019	Bengaluru	0	(0)
2018–2019	Bengaluru B	15	(2)
2019–2021	East Bengal	11	(1)
2020–2021	→ Mohammedan (loan)	11	(1)
2021–2022	Mohammedan	17	(1)
2022–2023	Sreenidi Deccan	19	(3)
2023–	NorthEast United	15	(1)
- * Club domestic league appearances and goals as of 16:00, 21 February 2024 (UTC)

Asheer Akhtar (born 14 December 1994) is an Indian professional footballer who plays as a defender for Indian Super League club NorthEast United.

== Club career ==
Born in Kamptee, a city based in the Nagpur district of Maharashtra, Akhtar started his career with the academy of I-League side Pune. After his time with Pune, Akhtar signed with I-League 2nd Division side Lonestar Kashmir and played the 2015–16 season with the club. When the 2nd Division concluded, Akhtar went on to represent Jammu and Kashmir in the Santosh Trophy. However, once the Santosh Trophy had ended, Akhtar moved again to Salgaocar of the Goa Professional League. During his stint with Salgaocar, Akhtar helped the side win the 2016–17 season of the Goa Professional League, thus earning his first major professional honour.

After the Goa Professional League finished, Akhtar signed with Mumbai of the I-League on 1 January 2017. Then, on 22 January 2017, he made his professional footballing debut for Mumbai in the I-League against Aizawl. He started and played 69 minutes as Mumbai lost 1–0.

== International career ==
In 2007, Akhtar was part of the India under-13 football team for the Asian U13 Football Festival.

== Career statistics ==
=== Club ===
As of 16 April 2023

Club	Season	League			Cup		Others		Continental		Total	
Club	Season	Division	Apps	Goals	Apps	Goals	Apps	Goals	Apps	Goals	Apps	Goals
Lonestar Kashmir	2016–17	I-League 2nd Division	8	0	0	0	—		—		8	0
Mumbai	2016–17	I-League	5	0	0	0	—		—		5	0
Bengaluru	2017–18	Indian Super League	0	0	0	0	—		2 (Note: Appearance(s) in AFC Cup)	0	2	0
Bengaluru B	2017–18	I-League 2nd Division	9	2	0	0	—		—		9	2
Bengaluru B	2018–19	I-League 2nd Division	6	0	0	0	—		—		6	0
Bengaluru B	Bengaluru B total		15	2	0	0	0	0	0	0	15	2
East Bengal	2019–20	I-League	11	1	2 (Note: Appearance(s) in Durand Cup)	0	6 (Note: Appearance(s) in Calcutta Football League)	0	—		19	1
Mohammedan (loan)	2020–21	I-League	11	1	0	0	—		—		11	1
Mohammedan	2021–22	I-League	17	1	0	0	—		—		17	1
Sreenidi Deccan	2022–23	I-League	19	3	2 (Note: Appearance(s) in Super Cup)	0	—		—		21	3
NorthEast United	2023–24	Indian Super League	0	0	0	0	—		—		0	0
Career total			86	8	4	0	6	0	2	0	98	8

== Honours ==
Salgaocar

- Goa Professional League: 2016–17

NorthEast United

- Durand Cup: 2024, 2025
