= Borja Gómez =

Spanish footballer

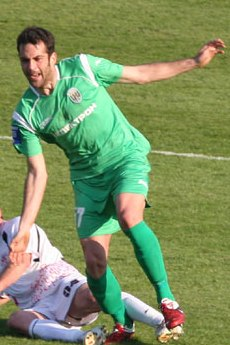
- Gómez in 2011

Personal information
- Full name: Borja Gómez Pérez
- Date of birth: 14 May 1988 (age 38)
- Place of birth: Madrid, Spain
- Height: 1.83 m (6 ft 0 in)
- Position: Centre-back

Youth career
- 2005–2007: Real Madrid

Senior career*
Years	Team	Apps	(Gls)
2007–2010	Alcorcón	86	(0)
2010–2011	Rayo Vallecano	11	(0)
2011–2012	Karpaty Lviv	25	(0)
2012	→ Granada (loan)	19	(0)
2012–2015	Granada	12	(0)
2013–2014	→ Hércules (loan)	10	(0)
2014–2015	→ Lugo (loan)	30	(1)
2015–2016	Oviedo	15	(0)
2017	Murcia	9	(0)
2017–2018	Logroñés	5	(0)
2018	S.S. Reyes	13	(0)
2018–2020	East Bengal	19	(1)
Total		254	(2)
- * Club domestic league appearances and goals

Borja Gómez Pérez (born 14 May 1988) is a Spanish former professional footballer who played as a central defender.

== Club career ==
Gómez was born in Madrid. An unsuccessful graduate from Real Madrid's youth system, he made his professional debut with another team in the community, AD Alcorcón, going on to spend three full seasons in the Segunda División B; he started and finished both legs of the 4–1 aggregate win over Real Madrid in the round of 32 of the 2009–10 Copa del Rey, scoring in a 3–2 home loss to Racing de Santander in the next stage.

In the 2010–11 campaign, Gómez had his first Segunda División experience, with another club from the Spanish capital, Rayo Vallecano. On 2 March 2011, after having played all the minutes in his 11 league appearances – mainly due to Iván Amaya's injury, however, as he was never part of manager José Ramón Sandoval's plans (a claim which the latter denied)– he signed a three-year contract with Ukrainian Premier League side FC Karpaty Lviv.

Gómez returned to his homeland the ensuing winter transfer window, joining Granada CF initially on loan. His first game in La Liga took place on 21 January 2012, when he featured the full 90 minutes in a 3–0 away loss against RCD Espanyol; during his two-year spell at the Nuevo Estadio de Los Cármenes, he made 31 competitive appearances.

In the following years, Gómez alternated between the second and third tiers of Spanish football, representing Hércules CF, CD Lugo, Real Oviedo, Real Murcia CF and UD Logroñés. While at the service of the third club, he suffered a right knee injury in January 2016 that sidelined him for seven months.

On 23 August 2018, Gómez signed with East Bengal FC of the Indian I-League. In January 2020, after spending several months on the sidelines due to injury, he returned home for personal reasons, and eventually asked to be released.

== Career statistics ==
Club	Season	League			Cup		Other		Total	
Club	Season	Division	Apps	Goals	Apps	Goals	Apps	Goals	Apps	Goals
Alcorcón	2007–08	Segunda División B	21	0	0	0	—		21	0
Alcorcón	2008–09	Segunda División B	34	0	0	0	6 (Note: Appearances in Segunda División B play-offs)	0	40	0
Alcorcón	2009–10	Segunda División B	31	0	6	1	6	0	43	1
Alcorcón	Total		86	0	6	1	12	0	104	1
Rayo Vallecano	2010–11	Segunda División	11	0	2	0	—		13	0
Karpaty Lviv	2010–11	Ukrainian Premier League	7	0	0	0	—		7	0
Karpaty Lviv	2011–12	Ukrainian Premier League	18	0	2	0	4 (Note: Appearances in UEFA Europa League)	0	24	0
Karpaty Lviv	Total		25	0	2	0	4	0	31	0
Granada (loan)	2011–12	La Liga	19	0	0	0	—		19	0
Granada	2012–13	La Liga	12	0	0	0	—		19	0
Hércules (loan)	2013–14	Segunda División	10	0	2	0	—		12	0
Lugo (loan)	2014–15	Segunda División	30	1	1	0	—		31	1
Oviedo	2015–16	Segunda División	15	0	2	0	—		17	0
Murcia	2016–17	Segunda División B	9	0	0	0	—		9	0
Logroñés	2017–18	Segunda División B	5	0	1	0	—		6	0
S.S. Reyes	2017–18	Segunda División B	13	0	0	0	—		13	0
East Bengal	2018–19	I-League	19	1	0	0	0	0	19	1
East Bengal	2019–20 (Note: Injured)	I-League	—		—		—		—	
Career total			254	2	16	1	16	0	286	3
