= Manoj Mohammed =

Indian footballer

Personal information
- Date of birth: 8 January 1999 (age 27)
- Place of birth: Jalpaiguri, West Bengal, India
- Position: Left back

Team information
- Current team: SC Delhi
- Number: 41

Youth career
- East Bengal

Senior career*
| Years | Team | Apps | (Gls) |
| 2018–2020 | East Bengal | 16 | (0) |
| 2020–2022 | Mohammedan | 26 | (0) |
| 2022–2025 | Hyderabad | 3 | (0) |
| 2025– | SC Delhi | 0 | (0) |
- * Club domestic league appearances and goals as of 21:45, 14 May 2022 (UTC)

Manoj Mohammed (born 8 January 1999) is an Indian professional footballer who plays as a defender for SC Delhi in the Indian Super League.

== Career ==
Manoj is a product of East Bengal F.C.' youth system. In 2010 Manoj joined the North Bengal academy of East Bengal at Rajganj, located at Jalpaiguri in North Bengal.

Ranjan Chowdhury, the Technical Director of East Bengal academy in Kolkata, transferred Manoj from the Rajganj academy to the main academy of East Bengal at Kolkata.

Manoj was the captain of the East Bengal U18 team and was a center back. He was a team member of East Bengal U18 squad that had narrowly lost in the final of the 2016–17 I-League U18.

In 2018 East Bengal head coach Alejandro Menéndez added him in the senior team squad for the 2018-19 I-League. Alejandro converted him from centre back to left back.

On 27 October 2018 he made his professional debut in an away match against NEROCA FC.

== Career statistics ==
=== Club ===
As of 14 May 2022

| Club | Season | League | | | Cup | | AFC | | Total | |
| Club | Season | Division | Apps | Goals | Apps | Goals | Apps | Goals | Apps | Goals |
|---|---|---|---|---|---|---|---|---|---|---|
| East Bengal | 2018–19 | I-League | 16 | 0 | 0 | 0 | – | | 16 | 0 |
| East Bengal | 2019–20 | I-League | 0 | 0 | 2 (Note: Appearance(s) in Durand Cup) | 0 | – | | 2 | 0 |
| East Bengal | East Bengal total | | 16 | 0 | 2 | 0 | 0 | 0 | 18 | 0 |
| Mohammedan | 2020–21 | I-League | 8 | 0 | 0 | 0 | – | | 8 | 0 |
| Mohammedan | 2021–22 | I-League | 16 | 0 | 5 | 0 | – | | 21 | 0 |
| Mohammedan | Hyderabad total | | 26 | 0 | 5 | 0 | 0 | 0 | 31 | 0 |
| Hyderabad | 2022–23 | Indian Super League | 0 | 0 | 0 | 0 | – | | 0 | 0 |
| Career total | | | 42 | 0 | 7 | 0 | 0 | 0 | 49 | 0 |

== Honours ==
Mohammedan Sporting

- Calcutta Football League: 2021
