= Peerless Group =

Indian Conglomerate

- Type: Public
- Industry: Insurance, Financial services, Travel, Hotel, Real estate
- Founded: 25 October 1932
- Headquarters: Kolkata, India
- Key people: D. Basu, Chairman; Sunil Kanti Roy (1944-2022), Managing Director
- Total assets: Rs 2,500 crore
- Subsidiaries: Peerless General Finance & Investment Company Ltd
- Website: www.peerless.co.in

Peerless Group is an Indian business conglomerate headquartered in Kolkata, West Bengal.

== History ==
The company was established in 1932 by industrialist Radhashyam Roy (then a School Teacher) in Narayanganj, Bangladesh. The company shifted base to Calcutta (now Kolkata) in 1935.

Also in 1932, he along with his friend and co-promoter Kali Kumar Chatterjee registered Hollywood Pictures Limited and later as an extension to film-making business, he built Jayshree Cinema Hall at Baranagar which was slated to open in 1946. Also in 1943, he registered Indian National Bank and was eager to convert it into a scheduled bank. But, due to communal riots ahead of Partition of India delayed the plan.

But, both the cinema hall and the bank went into liquidation. After the liquidation Peerless Life Insurance became the flagship company. Thereafter, Peerless Life Insurance was nationalized in 1956 and merged with Life Insurance Corporation.

Post-liberalization, Peerless General Finance & Investment Company Limited was established as a Registered Residuary Non-banking Company.

In 2022, Sunil Kanti Roy, the Managing Director of the Group and a Padma Shri recipient, died. He had assumed the leadership of the conglomerate from his elder brother, B.K. Roy, in 1985.

== Businesses ==
Currently, the Peerless Group operates with the following subsidiaries:

- Peerless General Finance & Investment Company - General Insurance
- Peerless Hospital - Healthcare
- Bengal Peerless - Real Estate
- Kaizen Holidays - Hospitality
- Peerless Hotels - Hospitality
- Peerless Sports Club - Sports
- Peerless Securities - Security
