= Marc Jiménez =

Spanish footballer (born 1985)

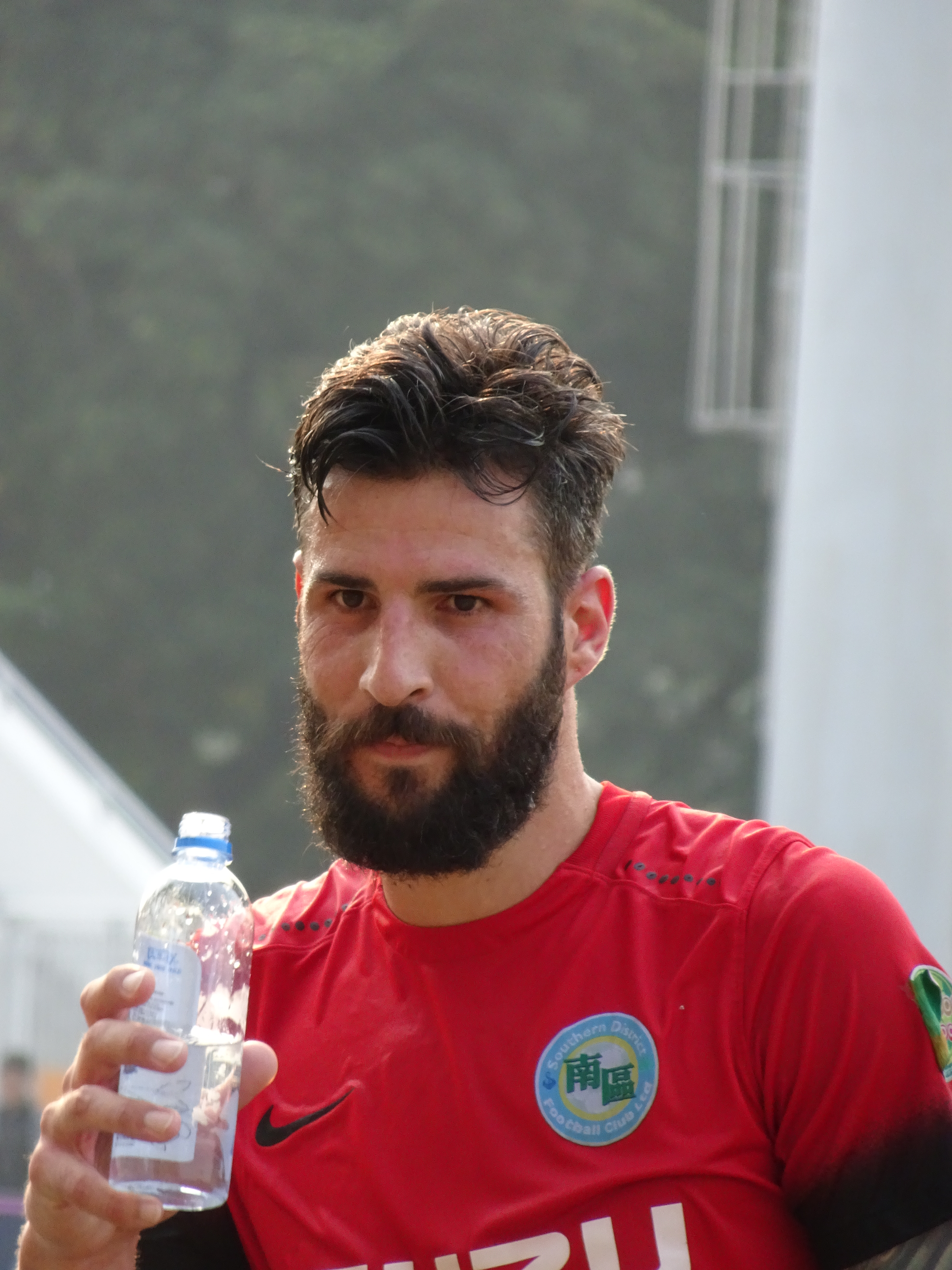

Personal information
- Full name: Marcos Eusebio Jiménez de la Espada Martín
- Date of birth: 3 November 1985 (age 40)
- Place of birth: Pollença, Spain
- Height: 1.86 m (6 ft 1 in)
- Position: Striker

Team information
- Current team: Campos

Youth career
- 2001–2003: La Salle
- 2003–2004: San Francisco

Senior career*
Years	Team	Apps	(Gls)
2004–2005	Constància	33	(18)
2005–2007	Mallorca B		
2007–2010	Sant Andreu	45	(14)
2008–2009	→ Orihuela (loan)	33	(6)
2010–2011	Sporting Mahonés	34	(8)
2011–2012	Sant Andreu	23	(14)
2012–2016	Gimnàstic	124	(39)
2016–2017	Kitchee	4	(0)
2017–2018	Southern	28	(22)
2018–2019	Atlético Baleares	33	(8)
2019–2020	East Bengal	14	(6)
2020–2021	Hospitalet	21	(0)
2021–2022	Andratx	22	(6)
2022–2024	Poblense	48	(13)
2024–	Campos	27	(1)
- * Club domestic league appearances and goals as of 11:57, 9 October 2025 (UTC)

Marcos "Marc" Eusebio Jiménez de la Espada Martín (born 3 November 1985) is a Spanish footballer who plays as a striker for Tercera Federación club Campos.

== Club career ==
Born in Pollença, Mallorca, Balearic Islands, Jiménez was a trainee of both SD La Salle and CD San Francisco, and made his senior debut with CE Constància in 2004–05, in Tercera División. He competed at that level the following three seasons, representing RCD Mallorca B and UE Sant Andreu.

In July 2008, Jiménez was loaned to Segunda División B club Orihuela CF. He subsequently returned to the Catalans, with the team now in the same division.

Jiménez moved to CF Sporting Mahonés also of the third tier in July 2010, and started in all his appearances in his only season to help to a 15th-place finish. On 15 July 2011, he rejoined Sant Andreu for a third spell.

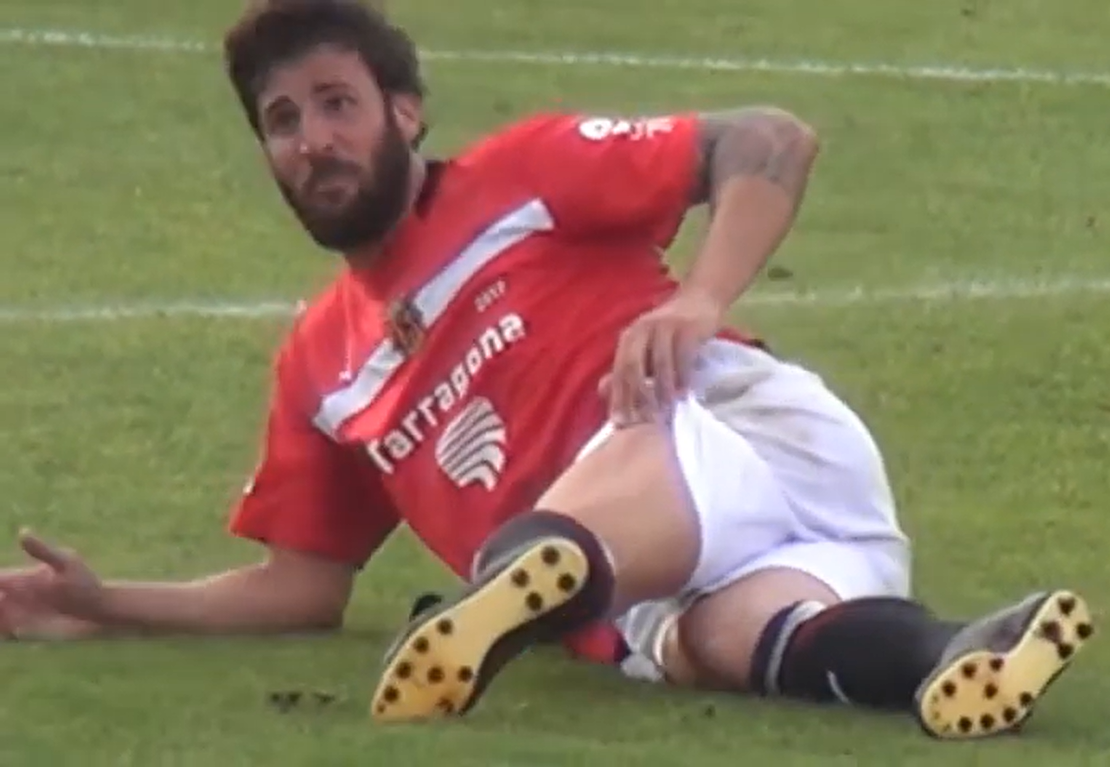
Jiménez playing for Gimnàstic in 2013

On 26 June 2012, Jiménez signed for Gimnàstic de Tarragona, recently relegated to division three. He scored 17 goals in his debut campaign, with his side ranking sixth.

After achieving promotion to Segunda División, Jiménez renewed his contract with Nàstic for a further year on 29 June 2015. He made his professional debut on 23 August (two months shy of his 30th birthday), coming on as a second-half substitute for Mossa in a 2–2 home draw against Albacete Balompié; he also scored the last goal through a penalty.

On 23 June 2016, after narrowly missing another promotion, Jiménez was released as his contract was due to expire. He resumed his career in the Hong Kong Premier League, with Kitchee SC and Southern District FC.

Jiménez joined East Bengal FC of the Indian I-League on 6 August 2019. He returned to his country and its third tier one year later, agreeing to a one-year deal at CE L'Hospitalet.

In July 2021, Jiménez signed for CE Andratx in the newly created Segunda División RFEF. The 36-year-old moved down to Tercera Federación for the 2022–23 season, joining UD Poblense also in his native region.

== Personal life ==
Jiménez was a member of the hipster subculture, distinguishing himself with a thick beard and a long hair.

== Career statistics ==
As of match played on 1 February 2020

Club	Season	League			Cup		Other		Total	
Club	Season	Division	Apps	Goals	Apps	Goals	Apps	Goals	Apps	Goals
Orihuela	2008–09	Segunda División B	33	6	4	0	—		37	6
Sant Andreu	2009–10	Segunda División B	20	3	1	0	1 (Note: Appearances in Segunda División B play-offs)	0	22	3
Sporting Mahonés	2010–11	Segunda División B	34	8	0	0	—		34	8
Sant Andreu	2011–12	Segunda División B	23	14	1	0	—		24	14
Gimnàstic	2012–13	Segunda División B	35	17	0	0	—		35	17
Gimnàstic	2013–14	Segunda División B	34	9	4	1	6	2	44	12
Gimnàstic	2014–15	Segunda División B	32	9	2	0	4	2	38	11
Gimnàstic	2015–16	Segunda División	23	4	1	0	1 (Note: Appearance in La Liga play-offs)	0	25	4
Gimnàstic	Total		124	39	7	1	12	4	143	44
Kitchee	2016–17	HK Premier League	4	0	0	0	—		4	0
Southern District	2016–17	HK Premier League	11	9	3	2	—		14	11
Southern District	2017–18	HK Premier League	17	13	2	1	—		19	14
Southern District	Total		28	22	5	3	—		33	25
Atlético Baleares	2018–19	Segunda División B	33	8	0	0	6	1	39	9
East Bengal	2019–20	I-League	9	5	0	0	6 (Note: Appearances in Calcutta Football League)	2	15	7
Career total			308	105	18	4	24	7	350	116
