= Martí Crespí =

Spanish footballer (born 1987)

Personal information
- Full name: Martí Crespí Pascual
- Date of birth: 15 June 1987 (age 39)
- Place of birth: Sa Pobla, Spain
- Height: 1.83 m (6 ft 0 in)
- Position: Centre-back

Youth career
- Poblense
- Mallorca

Senior career*
Years	Team	Apps	(Gls)
2006–2007	Mallorca B		
2007–2012	Mallorca	13	(0)
2007–2008	→ Granada 74 (loan)	37	(1)
2008–2009	→ Xerez (loan)	27	(2)
2009–2010	→ Elche (loan)	33	(3)
2012–2013	Chornomorets	0	(0)
2013	Racing Santander	17	(0)
2013–2015	Sabadell	54	(2)
2016–2017	Qingdao Huanghai	57	(13)
2018	Nei Mongol Zhongyou	3	(0)
2018–2019	Delhi Dynamos	15	(0)
2019–2020	East Bengal	8	(1)
2021	Barakaldo	1	(0)
2021–2022	San Fernando	17	(0)
2022–2024	Atlético Sanluqueño	33	(1)
2024	Poblense	5	(0)
Total		320	(23)

International career
2006	Spain U19	1	(0)
2007	Spain U20	1	(0)
- * Club domestic league appearances and goals

Martí Crespí Pascual (Spanish pronunciation: [maɾˈti kɾesˈpi]; born 15 June 1987) is a Spanish former professional footballer who played as a central defender.

== Club career ==
Born in Sa Pobla, Majorca, Balearic Islands, Crespí finished his development at local RCD Mallorca. He made his senior debut whilst on loan, successively representing Segunda División clubs Granada 74 CF, Xerez CD and Elche CF; he scored his first goal as a professional on 9 March 2008 while at the service of Granada, in a 2–1 away loss against CD Castellón.

After returning to the Estadi de Son Moix, Crespí's maiden appearance in La Liga took place on 3 October 2010 when he played the entire 1–1 away draw with FC Barcelona. During his two-year spell, he appeared in only 21 matches in all competitions.

Crespí moved to the Ukrainian Premier League on 12 July 2012, after signing with FC Chornomorets Odesa. In the following transfer window, he returned to his country and joined second-tier team Racing de Santander.

In the summer of 2013, after being relegated, Crespí signed a one-year contract at fellow league side CE Sabadell FC. He scored his first goal for them on 21 December of that year, helping to a 3–0 away victory over CD Tenerife.

After suffering another relegation, Crespí took his game to the China League One, starting out at Qingdao Huanghai FC. After a stint with Nei Mongol Zhongyou F.C. in the same tier, he joined Indian Super League club Delhi Dynamos FC on 23 August 2018.

== International career ==
Crespí won two caps for Spain at youth level. His only for the under-20s came on 21 March 2007, in a 3–1 friendly win against the Czech Republic.

== Career statistics ==
As of match played on 1 August 2018

Club	Season	League			Cup		Other		Total	
Club	Season	Division	Apps	Goals	Apps	Goals	Apps	Goals	Apps	Goals
Mallorca	2006–07	La Liga	0	0	0	0	—		0	0
Mallorca	2010–11	La Liga	5	0	4	0	—		9	0
Mallorca	2011–12	La Liga	8	0	4	0	—		12	0
Mallorca	Total		13	0	8	0	—		21	0
Granada 74 (loan)	2007–08	Segunda División	37	1	4	0	—		41	1
Xerez (loan)	2008–09	Segunda División	27	2	1	0	—		28	2
Elche (loan)	2009–10	Segunda División	33	2	1	0	—		34	2
Chornomorets	2012–13	Ukrainian Premier League	0	0	0	0	—		0	0
Racing Santander	2012–13	Segunda División	17	0	0	0	—		17	0
Sabadell	2013–14	Segunda División	31	2	0	0	—		31	2
Sabadell	2014–15	Segunda División	23	0	3	0	—		26	0
Sabadell	Total		54	2	3	0	—		57	2
Qingdao Huanghai	2016	China League One	29	10	0	0	—		29	10
Qingdao Huanghai	2017	China League One	28	3	1	0	—		29	3
Qingdao Huanghai	Total		57	13	1	0	—		58	13
Nei Mongol Zhongyou	2018	China League One	3	0	0	0	—		3	0
Career total			237	21	18	0	0	0	268	21

== Honours ==
Xerez

- Segunda División: 2008–09
