= Jaime Santos =

Spanish footballer

Personal information
- Full name: Jaime Santos Colado
- Date of birth: 27 April 1995 (age 31)
- Place of birth: Oviedo, Spain
- Height: 1.79 m (5 ft 10 in)
- Position: Winger

Team information
- Current team: Malacitano
- Number: 10

Youth career
- 2002–2014: Sporting Gijón

Senior career*
Years	Team	Apps	(Gls)
2014–2017	Sporting B	97	(18)
2017–2018	Mirandés	18	(0)
2018–2020	East Bengal	29	(11)
2021	Atl. Palmaflor	29	(8)
2022	San Fernando	11	(2)
2023–2024	Compostela	46	(6)
2024–2025	La Unión Atlético	29	(6)
2025–	Malacitano	4	(1)
- * Club domestic league appearances and goals as of 28 September 2025

Jaime Santos Colado (born 27 April 1995) is a Spanish professional footballer who plays for Segunda Federación club Malacitano as a winger.

== Career ==
=== Spain ===
Born in Oviedo, Asturias, Santos joined the youth setup of Sporting de Gijón in 2002. On 24 August 2014, he made his debut for the reserves, coming on as a substitute for Juan Mera in a 3–1 defeat against Real Oviedo, in Segunda División B. On 2 December 2015, his contract was extended until June 2018.

On 9 August 2017, Santos joined CD Mirandés on a one-year deal.

=== East Bengal ===
On 23 November 2018, he moved abroad and signed for Indian club East Bengal. Jaime debuted for East Bengal FC on 16 December 2018 in the all-important Kolkata Derby against the arch-rivals Mohun Bagan which East Bengal FC won 3–2. Jaime did not score but was impressive with his performance in front of a sell-out crowd. Jaime got his first goal in the very next match against Churchill Brothers S.C. when he volleyed in a Lalrindika Ralte's corner from outside the box to the bottom corner to equalize the match.
On 27 January 2019, Jaime Santos scored the opening goal in the return leg of the Kolkata Derby which East Bengal FC won 2–0, hence completing a double over their arch-rivals Mohun Bagan since 2003–04. In the 2018–19 I-League season, Jaime scored 5 goals in total, helping East Bengal FC finish runners-up to Chennai City F.C. by just 1 point.

On 12 June 2019, East Bengal FC announced the contract extension for 2 years for Jaime Santos, keeping him at the club till 2021.

=== San Fernando ===
On 16 February 2022, Santos signed with San Fernando in the third-tier Primera División RFEF.

== Club statistics ==
As of match played on 29 February 2020

Club	Season	League			Cup		Other		Total	
Club	Season	Division	Apps	Goals	Apps	Goals	Apps	Goals	Apps	Goals
Sporting B	2014–15	Segunda División B	33	6	—		—		33	6
Sporting B	2015–16	Segunda División B	29	4	—		—		29	4
Sporting B	2016–17	Tercera División	35	8	—		4 (Note: Appearances in Promotion Play-offs)	0	39	8
Sporting B	Total		97	18	—		4	0	101	18
Mirandés	2017–18	Segunda División B	18	0	0	0	—		18	0
East Bengal	2018–19	I-League	14	5	0	0	—		14	5
East Bengal	2019–20	I-League	13	6	4 (Note: Appearances in Durand Cup)	3	9 (Note: Appearances in Calcutta Football League)	7	26	16
East Bengal	Total		27	11	4	3	9	7	40	21
Career total			142	29	4	3	13	7	159	39
