= 2019–20 Mohun Bagan FC season =

Indian football club season

Mohun Bagan
2019–20 season
- Secretary: Srinjoy Bose
- Head coach: Kibu Vicuña
- Stadium: Mohun Bagan Ground; Salt Lake Stadium; Kalyani Stadium
- I-League: Champions
- CFL: Runners-up
- Durand Cup: Runners-up
- Sheikh Kamal Cup: Semi-finalist
- Top goalscorer: League: Baba Diawara; Fran Gonzalez (10 each); All: Fran Gonzalez (15)
- Highest home attendance: 63,756
Home colours	Away colours

The 2019–20 Mohun Bagan FC season was the club's 13th season in I-League and 130th season since its establishment in 1889. The team finished runners-up in the Calcutta Football League and Durand Cup. They were crowned Champions in the I-League and reached the semifinals of the Sheikh Kamal Cup where they were defeated by Terengganu.

== Players ==
Squad No.	Name	Nationality	Position	Date of birth & Age
Goalkeepers
1	Sankar Roy	(India)	GK	9 May 1995 (age 31)
22	Shilton Paul	(India)	GK	10 June 1988 (age 38)
24	Debjit Majumder (on loan from ATK)	(India)	GK	6 March 1988 (age 38)
Defenders
4	Francisco Morante Martínez	(Spain)	DF	28 June 1992 (age 34)
5	Gurjinder Kumar (VC)	(India)	DF	10 October 1990 (age 36)
6	Ashutosh Mehta	(India)	DF	21 February 1991 (age 35)
15	Lalramchullova	(India)	DF	14 January 1995 (age 31)
25	Dhanachandra Singh (C)	(India)	DF	4 March 1987 (age 39)
28	Bikramjeet Singh (on loan from Mumbai City FC)	(India)	DF	15 October 1992 (age 34)
45	Daneil Cyrus	(Trinidad and Tobago)	DF	15 December 1990 (age 35)
Midfielders
10	Joseba Agirregomezkorta Beitia	(Spain)	MF	29 September 1990 (age 36)
11	Alexander Romario Jesuraj (on loan from FC Goa)	(India)	MF	26 July 1996 (age 30)
16	Nongdamba Naorem (on loan from Kerala Blasters)	(India)	MF	2 January 2000 (age 26)
18	Lalramzauva Khiangte	(India)	MF	1 January 1997 (age 29)
26	Shilton D'Silva	(India)	MF	15 September 1992 (age 34)
27	SK Sahil ^{Y}	(India)	MF	28 April 2000 (age 26)
33	Britto PM	(India)	MF	15 March 1993 (age 33)
44	Kiyan Nassiri^{Y}	(India)	MF	17 November 2000 (age 25)
47	Sheikh Faiaz (on loan from ATK)	(India)	MF	3 March 1995 (age 31)
50	Francisco Javier González Muñoz	(Spain)	MF	1 February 1989 (age 37)
Forwards
7	Komron Tursunov	(Tajikistan)	FW	24 April 1996 (age 30)
9	Baba Diawara	(Senegal)	FW	5 January 1988 (age 38)
20	Suhair VP	(India)	FW	27 September 1992 (age 34)
49	Subha Ghosh ^{Y}	(India)	FW	22 December 2000 (age 25)

Last updated: 22 December 2019
Source: themohunbaganac.com

^{Y} Players promoted from the reserve team.

== Transfers ==
In

Date	Pos.	Name	From	Ref.
24 May 2019	DF	(India) Dhanachandra Singh	Jamshedpur	
24 May 2019	DF	(India) Ashutosh Mehta	Pune City	
28 May 2019	GK	(India) Dibyendu Sarkar	NBP Rainbow	
28 May 2019	DF	(India) Koushik Sarkar	East Bengal	
28 May 2019	DF	(India) Surabuddin Mollick	East Bengal	
28 May 2019	MF	(India) Babun Das	Pathachakra	
3 June 2019	GK	(India) Debjit Majumder (on loan)	ATK	
3 June 2019	FW	(India) Suhair VP	Gokulam	
5 June 2019	DF	(Spain) Fran Morante	Internacional de Madrid	
19 June 2019	FW	(Spain) Salva Chamorro	Doxa Drama	
20 June 2019	MF	(India) Sheikh Faiaz (on loan)	ATK	
20 June 2019	MF	(India) Imran Khan	FC Goa	
20 June 2019	MF	(India) Nongdamba Naorem (on loan)	Kerala Blasters	
6 July 2019	MF	(Spain) Fran González	Lee Man	
9 July 2019	MF	(India) Alexander Romario Jesuraj (on loan)	FC Goa	
9 July 2019	MF	(Spain) Joseba Beitia	Real Unión	
24 July 2019	DF	(India) Lalramchullova	East Bengal	
10 August 2019	DF	(Trinidad and Tobago) Daneil Cyrus	Al-Orobah FC	
31 August 2019	MF	(Spain) Julen Colinas	UCAM Murcia CF	
17 December 2019	FW	(Cameroon) Baba Diawara	Adelaide United	
22 December 2019	FW	(Tajikistan) Komron Tursunov	FC Istiklol	

Out

Date	Pos.	Name	To	Ref.
14 May 2019	FW	(Nigeria) Dipanda Dicka	Southern Samity	
6 June 2019	DF	(India) Abhishek Ambekar	East Bengal	
6 June 2019	MF	(India) Pintu Mahato	East Bengal	
7 June 2019	MF	(India) Sourav Das	Mumbai City	
9 July 2019	MF	(India) Tirthankar Sarkar	Mohammedan SC	
10 July 2019	FW	(Uganda) Henry Kisekka	Gokulam Kerala FC	
16 July 2019	MF	(Haiti) Sony Norde	Zira FK	
7 August 2019	MF	(India) Darren Caldeira	Kerala Blasters	
9 September 2019	DF	(India) Amey Ranawade	FC Goa	
–	GK	(India) Ricardo Cardozo	Released/Out of contract	–
–	GK	(India) Mainak Akuli	Released/Out of contract	–
–	DF	(Nigeria) Kingsley Obumneme	Released/Out of contract	–
–	DF	(India) Dalraj Singh	Released/Out of contract	–
–	MF	(Japan) Yuta Kinowaki	Released/Out of contract	–
–	MF	(India) William Lalnunfela	Released/Out of contract	–
–	MF	(Egypt) Omar Elhussieny	Released/Out of contract	–
–	MF	(India) Mehtab Hussain	Released/Out of contract	–
–	MF	(India) Abhinas Ruidas	Released/Out of contract	–
–	MF	(India) Dipankar Das	Released/Out of contract	–
–	FW	(Spain) Salva Chamorro	Released/Out of contract	–
–	MF	(Spain) Julen Colinas	Released/Out of contract	–

== Kits ==
Kit Sponsor	Co-Sponsors
Shiv Naresh	Ripley & Stevedoring, MP Birla Cement

Home	Away	Goalkeeper

== Staff ==
Position	Name
Chief Coach	(Spain) Kibu Vicuña
Assistant Coach	(Poland) Tomasz Tchórz
Assistant Coach	(India) Ranjan Chowdhury
Goalkeeping Coach	(India) Dipankar Chowdhury
Physical Trainer/Sports Therapist	(Lithuania) Paulius Ragauskas
Team Manager	(India) Satyajit Chatterjee

Last updated: 3 June 2019
Source: themohunbaganac.com

== Competitions ==
=== Overview ===
As of matches played till 15 March 2020

Competition	First match	Last match	Starting round	Final position	Record							
Competition	First match	Last match	Starting round	Final position	Pld	W	D	L	GF	GA	GD	Win %
I-League	30 November 2019	10 March 2020	Round 1	Winners (1st)	16	12	3	1	35	13	+22	75.00
Durand Cup	2 August 2019	24 August 2019	Group Stage	Runners-up	5	4	0	1	9	4	+5	80.00
CFL	6 August 2019	29 September 2019	Round 1	2nd	11	6	2	3	20	10	+10	54.55
Sheikh Kamal Cup	20 October 2019	29 October 2019	Group Stage	Semi-finals	4	2	0	2	6	6	+0	50.00
Total					36	24	5	7	70	33	+37	66.67

Source: Competitions

=== I-League ===
==== League table ====
Pos	Team	Pld	W	D	L	GF	GA	GD	Pts	Qualification or relegation
1	Mohun Bagan (C)	16	12	3	1	35	13	+22	39	Qualification for 2021 AFC Cup group stage
2	East Bengal	16	6	5	5	23	18	+5	23	
3	Punjab	16	5	8	3	23	21	+2	23	
4	Real Kashmir	15	6	4	5	16	14	+2	22	
5	Gokulam Kerala	15	6	4	5	20	19	+1	22	

Source: I-league, RSSSF
Rules for classification: 1) points; 2) head-to-head points; 3) head-to-head goal difference; 4) goal difference; 5) number of goals scored; 6) drawing of lots
(C) Champions

==== Results summary ====
Overall								Home						Away					
Pld	W	D	L	GF	GA	GD	Pts	W	D	L	GF	GA	GD	W	D	L	GF	GA	GD
16	13	2	1	35	13	+22	41	8	0	1	20	9	+11	5	2	0	15	4	+11

Last updated: 15 March 2020.
Source: soccerway.com

==== Matches ====
Win Draw Loss Fixtures

30 November 2019 1	Aizawl FC	0–0	Mohun Bagan	Aizawl
14:00 IST	Zoherliana (yellow card) 76'	Report	Morante (yellow card) 18'; Gurjinder (yellow card) 70'	Stadium: Rajiv Gandhi Stadium; Attendance: 7,642; Referee: O.P.Thakur; Man of the Match: Lalremruata

8 December 2019 2	Mohun Bagan	2–4	Churchill Brothers	Kalyani
17:00 IST	González 33' (pen.); Subha 90'; Morante (yellow card) 90+2'	Report	Plaza 2', 38'; Primus 29'; Poojary (yellow card) 45'; Ceesay (yellow card) 56'; Martins (yellow card) 56'; Abu Bakr 76'	Stadium: Kalyani Stadium; Attendance: 14,386; Referee: O.P.Thakur; Man of the Match: Willis Plaza

11 December 2019 3	Mohun Bagan	4–0	TRAU	Kalyani
17:00 IST	González 5', 46'; Suhair 38'; Naorem (yellow card) 57'; Gurjinder (yellow card) 75'; Subha 90+1'	Report	Tetteh (yellow card) 32'; Meitei (yellow card) 71'	Stadium: Kalyani Stadium; Attendance: 8,834; Referee: R.Saha; Man of the Match: Fran González

16 December 2019 4	Mohun Bagan	2–1	Gokulam Kerala	Kalyani
17:00 IST	González 24' ((pen.)), 48'; Mehta (yellow card) 28'; Beitia (yellow card) 73'; Gurjinder (yellow card) 79' (yellow-red card) 90+4'	Report	Naocha (yellow card) 26'; Mayakkannan (yellow card) 63'; Joseph 45+3' ((pen.))	Stadium: Kalyani Stadium; Attendance: 14,137; Referee: C.John; Man of the Match: Sankar Roy

6 January 2020 5	Real Kashmir	0–2	Mohun Bagan	Srinagar
11:30 IST	Katebe (yellow card) 27'; Subhash (yellow card) 36'	Report	Cyrus (yellow card) 64'; Beitia 72'; Naorem 74'	Stadium: TRC Turf Ground; Attendance: 11,521; Referee: U.Bora; Man of the Match: Fran Morante

9 January 2020 6	Mohun Bagan	1–0	Indian Arrows	Kalyani
17:00 IST	Cyrus 18'; Gonzalez (yellow card) 52'; Dhanachandra (yellow card) 61'; Beitia (yellow card) 78'	Report	Yumnam (yellow card) 72'; Vikram (yellow card) 86'	Stadium: Kalyani Stadium; Attendance: 10,938; Referee: P.Singh; Man of the Match: Daneil Cyrus

13 January 2020 7	Punjab F.C.	1–1	Mohun Bagan	Ludhiana
14:00 IST	Dipanda 20'; Danilo (yellow card) 30'	Report	Subha 87'	Stadium: Guru Nanak Stadium; Attendance: 1,131; Referee: U.Bora; Man of the Match: Danilo Quipapá

19 January 2020 8	Mohun Bagan	2–1	East Bengal	Kalyani
17:00 IST	Beitia 18'; González (yellow card) 36'; Cyrus (yellow card) 45+1': Diawara 65'; Gurjinder (yellow card) 66'; Sahil (yellow card) 81'; Sankar (yellow card) 90+1'	Report	Crespí (yellow card) 41'; Espada 71'	Stadium: Salt Lake Stadium; Attendance: 63,756; Referee: A.Meitei; Man of the Match: Joseba Beitia

23 January 2020 9	NEROCA	0–3	Mohun Bagan	Imphal
14:00 IST	Meetei (yellow card) 43'	Report	Mehta (yellow card) 6'; Naorem 27'; Diawara 53'; Tursunov 90+4'	Stadium: Khuman Lampak Stadium; Attendance: 8,220; Referee: T.Nagvenkar; Man of the Match: Baba Diawara

31 January 2020 10	Chennai City	2–3	Mohun Bagan	Coimbatore
19:00 IST	Eslava (yellow card) 24'; Santana (yellow card) 45'; Nagappan 65'; Balakrishnan 70'; Anandraj (yellow card) 75'	Report	Diawara (yellow card) 24' (goal) 27', 49'; González 29'; Suhair (yellow card) 45'; Mehta (yellow card) 59'	Stadium: Nehru Stadium; Attendance: 3,863; Referee: M.B.Santosh Kumar; Man of the Match: Baba Diawara

9 February 2020 11	Mohun Bagan	1–0	Punjab F.C.	Kalyani
17:00 IST	Diawara 42'; González (yellow card) 45+1'; Morante (yellow card) 45+1'; Beitia (yellow card) 63'; Sankar (yellow card) 83'	Report	Dipanda (yellow card) 45+1'; Shadap (yellow card) 80'	Stadium: Kalyani Stadium; Attendance: 14,756; Referee: M.B.Santosh Kumar; Man of the Match: Baba Diawara

14 February 2020 12	Mohun Bagan	6–2	NEROCA	Kalyani
17:00 IST	González 11', 24', 45'; Morante 13'; Diawara 37'; Sahil (yellow card) 42'; Dhanachandra (red card); Jesuraj 70'	Report	Adjah 41'; Moirangthem (yellow card) 43'; Subash 45+2'	Stadium: Kalyani Stadium; Attendance: 13,255; Referee: R.Moses Raj; Man of the Match: Fran González

22 February 2020 13	Churchill Brothers	0–3	Mohun Bagan	Vasco da Gama
19:00 IST	Martins (yellow card) 74'; Vinil (yellow card) 89'	Report	Diawara 7'; Suhair 51'; Komron 58'; Mehta (yellow card) 65'	Stadium: Tilak Maidan Stadium; Attendance: 4,242; Referee: C.R.Srikrishna; Man of the Match: Fran González

1 March 2020 14	TRAU	1–3	Mohun Bagan	Imphal
17:00 IST	Luwang (yellow card) 10'; Sunday 35'	Report	González 14'; Beitia 22'; Diawara 23' (yellow card) 82'; Tursunov (yellow card) 43' (yellow-red card) 70'	Stadium: Khuman Lampak Stadium

5 March 2020 15	Mohun Bagan	1–1	Chennai City	Kalyani
17:00 IST	D'Silva (yellow card) 17'; Diawara 45'; Morante (yellow card) 70'	Report	Katsumi 65'; Balakrishnan (yellow card) 80'; Thangalakath (yellow card) 88'	Stadium: Kalyani Stadium

10 March 2020 16	Mohun Bagan	1–0	Aizawl FC	Kalyani
17:00 IST	Subha (yellow card) 78'; Diawara 80'; Naorem (yellow card) 87'; D'Silva (yellow card) 88'	Report	Lalrosanga (yellow card) 8'; Lalnunfela (yellow card) 75'	Stadium: Kalyani Stadium

Canc 17	East Bengal	v	Mohun Bagan	Kolkata
17:00 IST				Stadium: Salt Lake Stadium

Canc 18	Indian Arrows	v	Mohun Bagan	Mumbai
17:00 IST				Stadium: Cooperage Ground

Canc 19	Mohun Bagan	v	Real Kashmir	Kolkata
17:00 IST				Stadium: Salt Lake Stadium

Canc 20	Gokulam Kerala	v	Mohun Bagan	Kozhikode
17:00 IST				Stadium: EMS Stadium

=== Durand Cup ===
==== Group stage ====
Pos	Team	Pld	W	D	L	GF	GA	GD	Pts	Qualification
1	Mohun Bagan (Q)	3	3	0	0	5	1	+4	9	Knockout stage
2	ATK (E)	3	1	1	1	3	3	0	4	
3	Mohammedan (E)	3	1	0	2	6	4	+2	3	
4	Indian Navy (E)	3	0	1	2	2	8	−6	1	

Updated to match(es) played on 17 August 2019. Source: goal.com
Rules for classification: Group stage tiebreakers
(E) Eliminated; (Q) Qualified for the phase indicated

Matches

2 August 2019	Mohun Bagan	2–0	Mohammedan	Kolkata
18:00 IST	Chamorro 2', 23'	Report		Stadium: Salt Lake Stadium; Attendance: 38,000; Referee: Crystal John

8 August 2019	Mohun Bagan	2–1	ATK	Kolkata
15:00 IST	Morante 34'; Beitia 53'	Report	Pradhan 78'	Stadium: Mohun Bagan Ground; Attendance: 17,000; Referee: C.R. Srikrishna

17 August 2019	Mohun Bagan	1–0	Indian Navy	Kolkata
18:30 IST	González 58'	Report		Stadium: Salt Lake Stadium; Attendance: 4,000

==== Knockout stages ====
Semi-final

21 August 2019	Mohun Bagan	3–1 (a.e.t.)	Real Kashmir	Kolkata
19:30 IST	Chamorro 42'; Suhair 92', 112'	Report	Krizo 90+3'	Stadium: Salt Lake Stadium; Attendance: 23,118

Final

24 August 2019	Mohun Bagan	1–2	Gokulam Kerala	Kolkata
18:30 IST	Chamorro 64'; Morante (red card) 90+7'	Report	Joseph 45+1' (pen.), 51'; George (red card) 87'	Stadium: Salt Lake Stadium; Attendance: 41,734

=== Calcutta Football League ===
Pos	Team	Pld	W	D	L	GF	GA	GD	Pts	Qualification or relegation
1	Peerless	11	7	2	2	24	11	+13	23	Champions
2	Mohun Bagan	11	6	2	3	20	10	+10	20	
3	East Bengal	11	6	2	3	17	13	+4	20 (Note: The game between East Bengal and Calcutta Customs was rescheduled due to unplayable weather & ground conditions, however on the later date East Bengal did not turn up & thus Customs were awarded a 3-0 win.)	
4	Mohammedan	11	5	4	2	16	13	+3	19	Qualified for I-League Qualifiers
5	Bhawanipore	11	5	2	4	20	14	+6	17	Qualified for I-League Qualifiers

==== Results by round ====
Round	1	2	3	4	5	6	7	8	9	10	11
Ground	H	H	H	A	A	H	A	A	H	H	H
Result	L	D	W	D	W	W	L	W	L	W	W
Position	12	10	6	8	4	1	5	2	5	3	2

Updated to match(es) played on 29 September 2019. Source: Soccerway
A = Away; H = Home; W = Win; D = Draw; L = Loss

==== Matches ====
5 August 2019 1	Mohun Bagan	0–3	Peerless SC	Kolkata
15:00 IST		Report	Kromah 21', 78'; Mandi 76'	Stadium: Mohun Bagan Ground; Attendance: 18,000; Referee: Pranjal Banerjee. Man of the Match: Kromah

14 August 2019 2	Mohun Bagan	1–1	Calcutta Customs	Kolkata
15:00 IST	González 21' (pen.); Lalchhawnkima (red card) 62'	Report	Stanley 89'	Stadium: Mohun Bagan Ground; Attendance: 16,000; Referee: Prateek Mondal. Man of the Match: Sankar

28 August 2019 3	Mohun Bagan	2–1	BSS Sporting Club	Kolkata
15:00 IST	Chamorro 29'; Naorem 47'	Report	Opoku 32'	Stadium: Kalyani Stadium; Attendance: 13,000; Referee: Pranjal Banerjee; Man of the Match: Naorem

1 September 2019 4	East Bengal	0–0	Mohun Bagan	Kolkata
15:00 IST	Aidara (yellow card) 39'; Ralte (yellow card) 80'	Report	Morante (yellow card) 73'	Stadium: Salt Lake Stadium; Attendance: 65,000; Referee: C.R. Srikrishna. Man of the Match: Beitia

5 September 2019 5	Bhawanipore	0–2	Mohun Bagan	Kolkata
15:00 IST		Report	Romario 29'; Naorem 56'	Stadium: Kalyani Stadium; Attendance: 12,000; Referee: Biplab Poddar. Man of the Match: Sahil

8 September 2019 6	Mohun Bagan	4–0	George Telegraph	Kolkata
15:00 IST	Suhair 15'; Chamorro 34'; Naorem 70'; González 84'	Report		Stadium: Mohun Bagan Ground; Attendance: 16,000; Referee: Nipen Haldar. Man of the Match: Naorem

12 September 2019 7	Aryan	2–1	Mohun Bagan	Kolkata
14:30 IST	Gatche 63'; Oraw 80'	Report	Subha 89'	Stadium: Kalyani Stadium; Attendance: 7,000; Man of the Match: Gatche

15 September 2019 8	Rainbow	0–1	Mohun Bagan	Kolkata
17:00 IST		Report	Subha 65'	Stadium: Kalyani Stadium; Attendance: 15,000; Referee: Tannoy Dhar. Man of the Match: Subha

19 September 2019 9	Mohun Bagan	2–3	Mohammedan	Kolkata
15:00 IST	Beitia 25'; Chamorro 70'	Report	Kareem 6'; Sarkar 10'; Chidi 61'	Stadium: Salt Lake Stadium; Attendance: 7,000

24 September 2019 10	Mohun Bagan	4–0	Southern Samity	Kolkata
15:00 IST	Suhair 7', 63'; Britto 78', 90+4'	Report		Stadium: Mohun Bagan Ground; Attendance: 2,000

29 September 2019 11	Mohun Bagan	3−0	Kalighat M.S.	Kolkata
15:00 IST	Chamorro 61'; Faiaz 70'; Morante 78'	Report		Stadium: Mohun Bagan Ground; Attendance: 11,000; Referee: Debashish Mandi. Man of the Match: Gurjinder

=== Sheikh Kamal Cup ===
==== Group stage ====
As of 25 October 2019

Pos	Team	Pld	W	D	L	GF	GA	GD	Pts	Qualification
1	(Bangladesh) Chittagong Abahani (H, Q)	3	2	0	1	8	3	+5	6	Advance to Semi-finals
2	(India) Mohun Bagan AC (Q)	3	2	0	1	4	2	+2	6	Advance to Semi-finals
3	(Laos) Young Elephant F.C. (E)	3	2	0	1	6	6	0	6	
4	(Maldives) TC Sports Club (E)	3	0	0	3	2	8	−6	0	

(E) Eliminated; (H) Hosts; (Q) Qualified for the phase indicated

Matches

20 October 2019	Mohun Bagan	1–2	(Laos) Young Elephant F.C.	Chittagong
19:00 BST	Colinas 18'	Report	Keohanam 44', 89'	Stadium: M. A. Aziz Stadium

23 October 2019	Mohun Bagan	2–0	(Maldives) TC Sports Club	Chittagong
16:00 BST	Daneil 4'; Chamorro 64'	Report		Stadium: M. A. Aziz Stadium

25 October 2019	(Bangladesh) Chittagong Abahani	0–1	Mohun Bagan	Chittagong
19:00 BST		Report	Suhair 62'	Stadium: M. A. Aziz Stadium

==== Knockout stages ====
Semi-final

29 October 2019	(Malaysia) Terengganu F.C.	4–2	Mohun Bagan	Chittagong
19:00 BST	Tuck 38', 59', 79'; Ismail 74'	Report	González 47', 61'	Stadium: M. A. Aziz Stadium

== Statistics ==
=== Overall player statistics ===
No.	Pos.	Nat.	Name	Total						I-League						Durand Cup					
No.	Pos.	Nat.	Name					Yellow card	Red card					Yellow card	Red card					Yellow card	Red card
1	GK	(India)	Sankar	16	0	0	0	2	0	14	0	0	0	2	0	2	0	0	0	0	0
~~3~~	DF	(India)	Sukhdev	1	0	0	0	0	0	0	0	0	0	0	0	1	0	0	0	0	0
4	DF	(Spain)	Morante	19	0	2	0	5	0	15	0	1	0	4	0	4	0	1	0	1	1
5	DF	(India)	Gurjinder	10	3	0	1	4	1	6	2	0	0	4	1	4	1	0	1	0	0
6	DF	(India)	Ashutosh	18	0	0	2	4	0	14	0	0	1	4	0	4	0	0	1	0	0
7	MF	(Tajikistan)	Tursonov	5	3	2	2	1	1	5	3	2	2	1	1	0	0	0	0	0	0
~~7~~	MF	(India)	Imran	1	3	0	0	0	0	0	0	0	0	0	0	1	3	0	0	0	0
~~8~~	DF	(India)	Koushik	0	0	0	0	0	0	0	0	0	0	0	0	0	0	0	0	0	0
9	FW	(Senegal)	Diawara	12	0	10	2	1	0	12	0	10	2	1	0	0	0	0	0	0	0
~~9~~	FW	(Spain)	Salva	3	3	4	0	0	0	0	2	0	0	0	0	3	1	4	0	0	0
10	MF	(Spain)	Joseba	17	0	4	11	3	0	16	0	3	9	3	0	4	0	1	2	0	0
11	MF	(India)	Jesuraj	4	8	1	0	0	0	1	6	1	0	0	0	3	2	0	0	0	0
~~14~~	DF	(India)	Arijit	1	0	0	0	0	0	0	0	0	0	0	0	1	0	0	0	0	0
15	DF	(India)	Lalramchullova	2	3	0	0	0	0	2	3	0	0	0	0	0	0	0	0	0	0
16	MF	(India)	Nongdamba	21	0	2	5	1	0	16	0	2	5	1	0	5	0	0	0	0	0
~~17~~	FW	(Spain)	Julen	4	0	0	0	0	0	4	0	0	0	0	0	0	0	0	0	0	0
18	MF	(India)	Lalramzauva	0	0	0	0	0	0	0	0	0	0	0	0	0	0	0	0	0	0
~~19~~	DF	(India)	Lalchhawnkima	3	0	0	0	1	0	0	0	0	0	0	0	3	0	0	0	1	0
20	FW	(India)	Suhair	19	1	4	3	1	0	16	0	2	2	1	0	3	1	2	1	0	0
~~21~~	MF	(India)	Surabuddin	4	0	0	0	0	1	0	0	0	0	0	0	4	0	0	0	0	1
22	GK	(India)	Shilton	1	0	0	0	0	0	0	0	0	0	0	0	1	0	0	0	0	0
~~23~~	FW	(India)	Deep ^{Y}	0	1	0	0	0	0	0	0	0	0	0	0	0	1	0	0	0	0
24	GK	(India)	Debjit	4	0	0	0	1	0	2	0	0	0	0	0	2	0	0	0	1	0
25	DF	(India)	Dhanachandra	12	1	0	0	1	1	10	0	0	0	1	1	2	1	0	0	0	0
26	MF	(India)	D'Silva	1	4	0	0	2	0	1	4	0	0	2	0	0	0	0	0	0	0
27	MF	(India)	Sahil ^{Y}	17	3	0	0	4	0	13	3	0	0	2	0	4	0	0	0	2	0
28	DF	(India)	Bikramjeet	0	0	0	0	0	0	0	0	0	0	0	0	0	0	0	0	0	0
~~31~~	GK	(India)	Dibyendu	0	0	0	0	0	0	0	0	0	0	0	0	0	0	0	0	0	0
33	MF	(India)	Britto	2	9	0	2	0	0	2	9	0	2	0	0	0	0	0	0	0	0
~~34~~	MF	(India)	Babun	0	0	0	0	0	0	0	0	0	0	0	0	0	0	0	0	0	0
~~35~~	FW	(India)	Azharuddin	0	0	0	0	0	0	0	0	0	0	0	0	0	0	0	0	0	0
44	MF	(India)	Kiyan ^{Y}	0	1	0	0	1	0	0	1	0	0	1	0	0	0	0	0	0	0
45	DF	(Trinidad and Tobago)	Daneil	11	0	1	2	2	0	11	0	1	2	2	0	0	0	0	0	0	0
47	MF	(India)	Faiaz	1	5	0	1	0	0	0	4	0	1	0	0	1	1	0	0	0	0
49	FW	(India)	Subha ^{Y}	1	8	3	0	1	0	0	8	3	0	1	0	1	0	0	0	0	0
50	MF	(Spain)	González	18	2	11	3	6	0	16	0	10	1	3	0	2	2	1	2	3	0

^{Y} Youth team player

Last updated: 10 March 2020.
Source: soccerway.com

=== Goalscorers ===
No.	Pos.	Nat.	Player	I-League	Durand Cup	CFL	SK Kamal Cup	Total
50	MF	(Spain)	González	10	1	2	2	15
9	FW	(Senegal)	Diawara	10				10
~~9~~	FW	(Spain)	Chamorro		4	4	1	9
20	FW	(India)	Suhair	2	2	3	1	8
16	MF	(India)	Nongdamba	2		3		5
10	MF	(Spain)	Beitia	3	1	1		5
49	FW	(India)	Subha ^{Y}	3		2		5
4	DF	(Spain)	Morante	1	1	1		3
7	FW	(Tajikistan)	Tursunov	2				2
16	MF	(India)	Romario	1		1		2
33	MF	(India)	Britto PM			2		2
45	DF	(Trinidad and Tobago)	Cyrus	1			1	2
~~17~~	MF	(Spain)	Colinas				1	1
47	MF	(India)	Faiaz			1		1
Own-goals								0
Total								70

^{Y} Youth team player.
