= 2019 Sheikh Kamal International Club Cup =

International club football tournament by the Bangladesh Football Federation

Tournament details
- Host country: Bangladesh
- City: Chittagong
- Dates: 19–31 October 2019
- Teams: 8 (from 5 AFC nations)
- Venue: 1 (in 1 host city)

Final positions
- Champions: (Malaysia) Terengganu (1st title)
- Runners-up: (Bangladesh) Chittagong Abahani

Tournament statistics
- Matches played: 15
- Goals scored: 59 (3.93 per match)
- Top scorer(s): (England) Lee Tuck (6 goals)
- Best player(s): (England) Lee Tuck (Terengganu)

The 2019 Sheikh Kamal International Club Cup, also known as Sheikh Kamal Gold Cup 2019, was the 3rd edition of Sheikh Kamal International Club Cup, an international club football tournament hosted by the Chittagong Abahani in association with the Bangladesh Football Federation. This tournament took place at the M. A. Aziz Stadium in the port city of Chittagong from 19 October to 30 October 2019. Participation fees for each team are US$10,000 and the champion of the tournament was awarded US$50,000 and the runner-up was awarded US$25,000.

Maldivian side T.C. Sports Club were the defending champions having won the 2017 edition, but were eliminated from group stage in this edition

== Participating teams ==
Eight clubs sent their team to participate in the tournament from five nations of AFC. Two teams from Bangladesh, three teams from India, and one team each from Laos, Malaysia and Maldives participated.

Following are the participated teams:

- (Bangladesh) Chittagong Abahani (Host)
- (Bangladesh) Bashundhara Kings
- (India) Mohun Bagan
- (India) Chennai City
- (India) Gokulam Kerala
- (Malaysia) Terengganu
- (Maldives) TC Sports Club
- (Laos) Young Elephants

== Draw ==
The draw were held on 11 October 2019 in Dhaka. The eight teams were divided into 2 groups. The top 2 teams from each group will qualify for Semi-finals.

=== Group draw ===
Group A	Group B
(Bangladesh) Chittagong Abahani	(Bangladesh) Bashundhara Kings
(India) Mohun Bagan	(India) Chennai City
(Maldives) TC Sports Club	(India) Gokulam Kerala
(Laos) Young Elephants	(Malaysia) Terengganu

== Venue ==
Chittagong
M. A. Aziz Stadium
Capacity: 25,000

== Group stages ==
- All Matches were played at Chittagong.
- Times Listed are UTC+6:00

Key to colours in group tables
Group Winners and Runners-up advance to the Semi-finals

=== Group A ===
Pos	Team	Pld	W	D	L	GF	GA	GD	Pts	Qualification
1	(Bangladesh) Chittagong Abahani (H)	3	2	0	1	8	3	+5	6	Advance to Semi-finals
2	(India) Mohun Bagan	3	2	0	1	4	2	+2	6	Advance to Semi-finals
3	(Laos) Young Elephants	3	2	0	1	6	6	0	6	
4	(Maldives) TC Sports Club	3	0	0	3	2	8	−6	0	

Source: GSA
(H) Hosts

19 October 2019
19:00

TC Sports Club (Maldives)	1–4	(Bangladesh) Chittagong Abahani
Easa 88'	Report	Chinedu 8', 39'; Arafat 10'; Rotković 71'

M. A. Aziz Stadium, Chittagong
Referee: Murad Alzawahreh (Jordan)

20 October 2019
19:00

Mohun Bagan (India)	1–2	(Laos) Young Elephants
Colinas 18'	Report	Keohanam 44', 89'

M. A. Aziz Stadium, Chittagong
Referee: Mizanur Rahman (Bangladesh)

23 October 2019
16:00

TC Sports Club (Maldives)	0–2	(India) Mohun Bagan
	Report	Cyrus 4'; Chamorro 64'

M. A. Aziz Stadium, Chittagong
Referee: Jalal Uddin (Bangladesh)
23 October 2019
19:00

Young Elephants (Laos)	2–4	(Bangladesh) Chittagong Abahani
Thanakhanty 14'; Keohanam 33'	Report	Chinedu 9'; Rotković 54'; Bhuyan 72'; Brossou 78'

M. A. Aziz Stadium, Chittagong
Referee: Sudish Kumar Pandey (Nepal)

25 October 2019
16:00

Young Elephants (Laos)	2−1	(Maldives) TC Sports Club
Bounkong 17', 59'	Report	Samir 78'

M. A. Aziz Stadium, Chittagong
Referee: Mizanur Rahman (Bangladesh)
25 October 2019
19:00

Chittagong Abahani (Bangladesh)	0–1	(India) Mohun Bagan
	Report	Suhair 59'

M. A. Aziz Stadium, Chittagong
Referee: Shraban Kumar Tamang (Nepal)

=== Group B ===
Pos	Team	Pld	W	D	L	GF	GA	GD	Pts	Qualification
1	(Malaysia) Terengganu	3	2	1	0	9	5	+4	7	Advance to Semi-finals
2	(India) Gokulam Kerala	3	2	1	0	5	1	+4	7	Advance to Semi-finals
3	(Bangladesh) Bashundhara Kings	3	1	0	2	6	9	−3	3	
4	(India) Chennai City	3	0	0	3	5	10	−5	0	

Source: GSA

22 October 2019
16:00

Chennai City (India)	3–5	(Malaysia) Terengganu
Yusa 23'; Shereef 33'; Manzi 87'	Report	Makasuf 5'; Suzuki 38', 46', 71', 80'

M. A. Aziz Stadium, Chittagong
Referee: Ashantha Priyadharshana Dias (Sri Lanka)
22 October 2019
19:00

Bashundhara Kings (Bangladesh)	1–3	(India) Gokulam Kerala
Motin 74'	Report	Kisekka 25', 46'; García 31'

M. A. Aziz Stadium, Chittagong
Referee: Shraban Kumar Tamang (Nepal)

24 October 2019
16:00

Bashundhara Kings (Bangladesh)	3–2	(India) Chennai City
Kdouh 6', 88'; Duyshobekov 59'	Report	Manzi 43'; Shereef 71'

M. A. Aziz Stadium, Chittagong
Referee: Lakmal Weerakkody (Sri Lanka)
24 October 2019
19:00

Terengganu (Malaysia)	0−0	(India) Gokulam Kerala
	Report

M. A. Aziz Stadium, Chittagong
Referee: Murad Alzawahreh (Jordan)

26 October 2019
16:00

Gokulam Kerala (India)	2−0	(India) Chennai City
Lalromawia 8'; Kisekka 11'	Report

M. A. Aziz Stadium, Chittagong
Referee: Jalal Uddin (Bangladesh)
26 October 2019
19:00

Terengganu (Malaysia)	4−2	(Bangladesh) Bashundhara Kings
Tuck 45+1' (pen.), 45+3' (pen.), 75'; Alias 78'	Report	Colindres 27'; Kdouh 83'

M. A. Aziz Stadium, Chittagong
Referee: Sudish Kumar Pandey (Nepal)

== Knockout stage ==
- Time listed are UTC+6:00
- All matches played at Chittagong
- In the knockout stage, extra time and penalty shoot-out are used to decide the winner if necessary.

=== Bracket ===
Semi-finals

Final

28 October

(Bangladesh) Chittagong Abahani
3

31 October

(India) Gokulam Kerala
2

(Bangladesh) Chittagong Abahani
1

29 October

(Malaysia) Terengganu

2

(Malaysia) Terengganu
4

(India) Mohun Bagan
2

=== Semi-finals ===
28 October 2019
19:00

Chittagong Abahani (Bangladesh)	3–2 (a.e.t.)	(India) Gokulam Kerala
Brossou 47', 90'; Chinedu 105'	Report	Kisekka 29'; Joseph 80'

M. A. Aziz Stadium, Chittagong
Attendance: 28,000
Referee: Murad Alzawahreh (Jordan)

29 October 2019
19:00

Terengganu (Malaysia)	4–2	(India) Mohun Bagan
Tuck 39', 59', 79' (pen.); Syafik 75'	Report	González 47' (pen.), 61'

M. A. Aziz Stadium, Chittagong
Referee: Shraban Kumar Tamang (Nepal)

=== Final ===
31 October 2019
18:00

Chittagong Abahani (Bangladesh)	1−2	(Malaysia) Terengganu
Rotković 48'	Report	Hakim 15'; Alias 20'

M. A. Aziz Stadium, Chittagong
Referee: Sudish Kumar Pandey (Nepal)

== Winners ==
Sheikh Kamal International Club Cup 2019
Winners
Terengganu
First Title
Runners-up
(Bangladesh) Chittagong Abahani
Third-place
(India) Gokulam Kerala
(India) Mohun Bagan
(joint-third)

== Goalscorers ==
There have been 59 goals scored in 15 matches, for an average of 3.93 goals per match (as of 31 October 2019).

6 goals

- (England) Lee Tuck (Terengganu)

4 goals

- (Brazil) Bruno Suzuki (Terengganu)
- (Nigeria) Matthew Chinedu (Chittagong Abahani)
- (Uganda) Henry Kisekka (Gokulam Kerala)

3 goals

- (Ivory Coast) Didier Brossou (Chittagong Abahani)
- (Laos) Somxay Keohanam (Young Elephants)
- (Lebanon) Mohamad Kdouh (Bashundhara Kings)
- (Montenegro) Luka Rotković (Chittagong Abahani)

2 goals

- (India) Mashoor Shereef (Chennai City)
- (Laos) Bounphachan Bounkong (Young Elephants)
- (Malaysia) Azalinullah Alias (Terengganu)
- (Spain) Pedro Manzi (Chennai City)
- (Spain) Fran González (Mohun Bagan)

1 goal

- (Bangladesh) Jamal Bhuyan (Chittagong Abahani)
- (Bangladesh) Yeasin Arafat (Chittagong Abahani)
- (Bangladesh) Motin Mia (Bashundhara Kings)
- (Costa Rica) Daniel Colindres (Bashundhara Kings)
- (India) Lalromawia (Gokulam Kerala)
- (India) V. P. Suhair (Mohun Bagan)
- (Japan) Katsumi Yusa (Chennai City)
- (Kyrgyzstan) Bakhtiyar Duyshobekov (Bashundhara Kings)
- (Laos) Aphixay Thanakhanty (Young Elephants)
- (Malaysia) Hairiey Hakim (Terengganu)
- (Malaysia) Rahmat Makasuf (Terengganu)
- (Malaysia) Syafik Ismail (Terengganu)
- (Maldives) Ismail Easa (TC Sports Club)
- (Maldives) Mohamed Samir (TC Sports Club)
- (Spain) Julen Colinas (Mohun Bagan)
- (Spain) Salva Chamorro (Mohun Bagan)
- (Trinidad and Tobago) Daneil Cyrus (Mohun Bagan)
- (Trinidad and Tobago) Marcus Joseph (Gokulam Kerala)
- (Trinidad and Tobago) Nathaniel García (Gokulam Kerala)

== Prize money ==
Finishing Position	Team	Prize money
Champions	Terengganu FC	USD 50,000
Runners-up	Chittagong Abahani	USD 25,000

== Media coverage ==
- Bangladeshi satellite channels Channel 9, Bangla TV & Bangladesh Television live telecasted all matches in Bangladesh and South Asian countries as well as rest of the world.
- Online stream: Cplustv YouTube channel https://www.youtube.com/channel/UC3aNZXndc9tRpYKYKSYUbrg
- Bangladesh Betar 104.0 FM telecasted live commentary all matches from the stadium.
- Print media partners are The Daily Star also The Bonik Barta.
