= 2019 Durand Cup =

129th edition of the Durand Cup

Tournament details
- Country: India
- Venue: Kolkata
- Dates: 2 – 24 August 2019
- Teams: 16

Final positions
- Champions: Gokulam Kerala (1st title)
- Runners-up: Mohun Bagan

Tournament statistics
- Matches played: 27
- Goals scored: 74 (2.74 per match)
- Top goal scorer(s): Marcus Joseph (Gokulam Kerala) (11 goals)

The 2019 Durand Cup was the 129th edition of the Durand Cup, oldest football tournament in Asia, since the tournament's founding in 1888. 16 teams competed in the tournament. The matches were played across three locations in West Bengal, namely Kolkata, Howrah and Kalyani from 2 August 2019. The final took place at the Salt Lake Stadium on 24 August 2019.

Army Green were the defending champions, having defeated NEROCA in the 2016 final, however they did not qualify for the semi-finals having finished last in the group. Gokulam Kerala won their maiden title by defeating Mohun Bagan 2–1 in the 2019 Durand Cup Final which was held on 24 August 2019.

== Teams ==
A total of 16 teams participated in this year's competition. 5 teams from Indian Super League, 6 from I-League, 1 2nd division club and 4 armed forces teams.

Location of teams of the 2019 Durand Cup.
Indian Super League Team
I League Team
2nd Division I League Team
Armed Force Team
Kolkata, New Delhi (Armed Force)

Indian Super League

- ATK
- Bengaluru
- Chennaiyin
- Goa
- Jamshedpur

I-League

- Chennai City
- East Bengal
- Gokulam Kerala
- Mohun Bagan
- Real Kashmir
- TRAU

I-League 2nd division

- Mohammedan

Armed Force Teams

- Indian Air Force
- Army Green
- Army Red
- Indian Navy

== Prize money ==
Position	Prize money
Champions	₹4 million (US$42,000)
Runners-up	₹2 million (US$21,000)
Semi-finalists	₹0.5 million (US$5,200)
Total	~₹7 million (US$73,000)

== Official sponsors and partners ==
=== Powered by ===
GAIL

=== Co-sponsors ===
- Coal India
- State Bank of India
- Sunfeast
- SERVO IndianOil

=== Associate sponsors ===
- ONGC
- UCO Bank
- Cadbury Bourn Vita
- Dabur
- Amul
- JIS Group

=== Supported by ===
- GRSE
- Mazagon Dock Shipbuilders
- Allahabad Bank
- Sneha Farms
- NOVA Lens
- PS Group Realty
- Maxo Genius
- Gloster
- Siti Networks

=== Tournament partner ===
- IFA W.B.
- Cherry Tree

== Venues ==
Kalyani	Kolkata	Howrah	Kolkata	Kolkata
Kalyani Stadium	Vivekananda Yuba Bharati Krirangan	Howrah Stadium	East Bengal Ground	Mohun Bagan Ground
Capacity: 20000	Capacity: 85000	Capacity: 15000	Capacity: 23500	Capacity: 22000

== Broadcasting ==
All match were streamed LIVE on Addatimes. Semifinals & Final matches were streamed LIVE on Hotstar as well.

Matches	Television broadcaster(s)	Online streaming
Group Stage	DD Kashir (all matches of Real Kashmir); DD Bangla	Addatimes
Semi finals & Final	Star Sports 3 & Star Sports 1 Bangla	Hotstar Addatimes

91.9 Friends FM was the official radio partner of the tournament.

== Round Dates ==
Round	Match date	Number of fixtures	Teams
Group stage	2 August– 18 August	24	16
Semi-final	21 August	2	4
Final	24 August	1	2

== Group stage ==
Tiebreakers
The teams are ranked according to points (3 points for a win, 1 point for a draw, 0 points for a loss). If two or more teams are equal on points on completion of the group matches, the following criteria are applied in the order given to determine the rankings:
1. Greater number of points obtained in the matches between the Teams concerned
2. Goal difference resulting from the matches between the Teams concerned
3. Greater number of goals scored in the matches between the Teams concerned
4. Goal difference in all the matches
5. Greater number of goals scored in all the matches
6. Drawing of lots

=== Group A ===
Pos	Team	Pld	W	D	L	GF	GA	GD	Pts	Qualification
1	East Bengal	3	3	0	0	10	1	+9	9	Knockout stage
2	Bengaluru	3	0	2	1	5	6	−1	2	
3	Army Red	3	0	2	1	3	5	−2	2	
4	Jamshedpur	3	0	2	1	5	11	−6	2	

Rules for classification: Group stage tiebreakers

3 August 2019
15:00 IST

East Bengal	2–0	Army Red
Colado 84'; B. Singh 90'	Report

East Bengal Ground, Kolkata

5 August 2019
15:00

Bengaluru	1–1	Army Red
Wangjam 80' (pen.)	Report	Liton Shil 45+4'

Salt Lake Stadium, Kolkata

6 August 2019
15:00

East Bengal	6–0	Jamshedpur
Colado 5' (pen.), 7'; Mahata 31'; B. Singh 75', 80'; Haokip 90+2'	Report

East Bengal Ground, Kolkata

9 August 2019
15:00

Jamshedpur	2–2	Army Red
Vimal Kumhar 17', 33'	Report	N Suresh Meitei 4', 67' (pen.)

Kalyani Stadium, Kalyani

14 August 2019
18:00

East Bengal	2–1	Bengaluru
B. Singh 59', 74'	Report	A. Chhetri 17'

Salt Lake Stadium, Kolkata

17 August 2019
15:00

Bengaluru	3–3	Jamshedpur
Leon Augustine 45'; Wangjam 90+1' (pen.), 90+4' (pen.)	Report	Vimal Kumhar 1'; Aakash Dave 51'; Nabin Rana 80'

Salt Lake Stadium, Kolkata

=== Group B ===
Pos	Team	Pld	W	D	L	GF	GA	GD	Pts	Qualification
1	Mohun Bagan	3	3	0	0	5	1	+4	9	Knockout stage
2	ATK	3	1	1	1	3	3	0	4	
3	Mohammedan	3	1	0	2	6	5	+1	3	
4	Indian Navy	3	0	1	2	3	7	−4	1	

Rules for classification: Group stage tiebreakers

2 August 2019
18:00

Mohun Bagan	2–0	Mohammedan
Chamorro 2', 24'	Report

Vivekananda Yubabharati Krirangan, Kolkata
Attendance: 38,000

5 August 2019
18:30

Indian Navy	1–1	ATK
Harikrishna AU 19'	Report	Das 88' (pen.)

Vivekananda Yubabharati Krirangan, Kolkata

8 August 2019
15:00

Mohun Bagan	2–1	ATK
Morante 34'; Beitia 53'	Report	Pradhan 78'

Mohun Bagan Ground, Kolkata
Attendance: 18,327

10 August 2019
15:00

Mohammedan	6–2	Indian Navy
Arthur Kouassi 55', 72', 76', 85' (pen.), 90'; Musa Mudde 61'	Report	Britto PM 71', 90+5' (pen.)

Mohun Bagan Ground, Kolkata
Attendance: 5,677

16 August 2019
18:00

Mohammedan	0−1	ATK
	Report	William Pauliankhum 2'

Vivekananda Yubabharati Krirangan, Kolkata

17 August 2019
18:30

Mohun Bagan	1–0	Indian Navy
Fran González 58' (pen.)	Report

Vivekananda Yubabharati Krirangan, Kolkata

=== Group C ===
Pos	Team	Pld	W	D	L	GF	GA	GD	Pts	Qualification
1	Real Kashmir	3	2	1	0	5	0	+5	7	Knockout stage
2	Goa	3	2	1	0	3	1	+2	7	
3	Chennai City	3	1	0	2	3	4	−1	3	
4	Army Green	3	0	0	3	1	7	−6	0	

Rules for classification: Group stage tiebreakers

7 August 2019
15:00

Real Kashmir	1–0	Chennai City
Danish Farooq 90'	Report

Kalyani Stadium, Kalyani

8 August 2019
15:00

Goa	1–0	Army Green
Liston 27'	Report

Kalyani Stadium, Kalyani

10 August 2019
15:00

Army Green	0–4	Real Kashmir
	Report	Chesterpoul 3', 40'; Subhash 34'; Vicky 90+3'

Kalyani Stadium, Kalyani

14 August 2019
15:00

Chennai City	1–2	Goa
Mashoor 16'	Report	Liston 8'; Nestor Dias 30'

Kalyani Stadium, Kalyani

17 August 2019
15:00

Goa	0–0	Real Kashmir
	Report

Kalyani Stadium, Kalyani

18 August 2019
15:00

Chennai City	2–1	Army Green
Mashoor 42'; Eugene 66'		Lallawmkima PC 10'

Kalyani Stadium, Kalyani

=== Group D ===
Pos	Team	Pld	W	D	L	GF	GA	GD	Pts	Qualification
1	Gokulam Kerala	3	3	0	0	11	1	+10	9	Knockout stage
2	Indian Air Force	3	1	1	1	1	3	−2	4	
3	Chennaiyin	3	0	2	1	0	4	−4	2	
4	TRAU	3	0	1	2	1	5	−4	1	

Rules for classification: Group stage tiebreakers

8 August 2019
15:00

Gokulam Kerala	4–0	Chennaiyin
Joseph 39', 66', 75'; Kisekka 68'	Report

Howrah Stadium, Howrah

9 August 2019
15:00

TRAU	0–1	Indian Air Force
	Report	Mohammed Aqib 65'

Howrah Stadium, Howrah

14 August 2019
15:00

Indian Air Force	0–3	Gokulam Kerala
	Report	Joseph 43', 87'; Shibil 56'

Howrah Stadium, Howrah

17 August 2019
15:00

Chennaiyin	abandoned	TRAU
	Report

Howrah Stadium, Howrah

18 August 2019
15:00

Chennaiyin	0–0	Indian Air Force
	Report

Mohun Bagan Ground, Kolkata

18 August 2019
15:00

TRAU	1–4	Gokulam Kerala
M. Roger 87'	Report	Joseph 58', 64' (pen.), 83'; Ettienne 73'

VYBK Training Ground 2

== Knockout stage ==
Winners of each group will progress into the semi-finals. The winner of Group A will face the winner of Group D, and the winner of Group B will face the winner of Group C in the semi-final.

The knockout matches will have thirty minutes of extra-time if the teams are tied at the end of usual time, and if they are drawing even after that, the winner of the fixture will be decided through penalty shootouts.

=== Bracket ===
Semi-finals; 21 August 2019
East Bengal	1 (2)
Gokulam Kerala (p)	1 (3)
Mohun Bagan (a.e.t.)	3
Real Kashmir	1

Final; 24 August 2019
Gokulam Kerala	2
Mohun Bagan	1

=== Semi-finals ===
21 August 2019
15.00

East Bengal	1−1 (a.e.t.)	Gokulam Kerala
Mallick 17'	Report	Joseph 90+2' (pen.)
Penalties
Ralte (penalty missed); Colado (penalty missed); Pascual (penalty scored); Haokip (penalty scored); Naorem (penalty missed)	2–3	(penalty scored) Pelissari; (penalty missed) Meitei; (penalty scored) Jestin George; (penalty scored) Lalromawia

Vivekananda Yuba Bharati Krirangan, Kolkata
Attendance: 18,162
Referee: Tejas Narvenkar (India)

21 August 2019
19:30

Mohun Bagan	3−1 (a.e.t.)	Real Kashmir
Chamorro 42'; Suhair 112', 113'	Report	Krizo 90+3'

Vivekananda Yuba Bharati Krirangan, Kolkata
Attendance: 23,118

== Final ==
24 August 2019
17:00

Mohun Bagan	1–2	Gokulam Kerala
Chamorro 64'	Report	Joseph 45+1' (pen.), 51'

Salt Lake Stadium, Kolkata

== Goalscorers ==
There were 74 goals scored in 27 matches, for an average of 2.74 goals per match.

11 goals

- (Trinidad and Tobago) Marcus Joseph (Gokulam Kerala FC)

5 goals

- (India) Bidyashagar Singh (East Bengal)
- (Ivory Coast) Arthur Kouassi (Mohammedan)

4 goals

- (Spain) Salva Chamorro (Mohun Bagan)

3 goals

- (India) Vimal Kumhar (Jamshedpur)
- (India) Suresh Singh Wangjam (Bengaluru)
- (Spain) Jaime Santos Colado (East Bengal)

2 goals

- (Ivory Coast) Gnohere Krizo (Real Kashmir)
- (India) N Suresh Meitei (Army Red)
- (India) Chesterpoul Lyngdoh (Real Kashmir)
- (India) Britto PM (Indian Navy)
- (India) Liston Colaco (Goa)
- (India) Mashoor Shereef (Chennai City)
- (India) Suhair VP (Mohun Bagan)

1 goal

- (India) Liton Shil (Army Red)
- (India) Harikrishna AU (Indian Navy)
- (India) Prabir Das (ATK)
- (India) Ashish Pradhan (ATK)
- (India) Pintu Mahata (East Bengal)
- (India) Boithang Haokip (East Bengal)
- (India) Danish Farooq (Real Kashmir)
- (India) Mohammed Aqib (Indian Air Force)
- (India) Subhash Singh (Real Kashmir)
- (India) Vicky Meitei (Real Kashmir)
- (India) Nestor Dias (Goa)
- (India) Shibil Muhammed (Gokulam Kerala FC)
- (India) William Pauliankhum (ATK)
- (India) Ajay Chhetri (Bengaluru)
- (India) Leon Augustine (Bengaluru)
- (India) Aakash Dave (Jamshedpur)
- (India) Nabin Rana (Jamshedpur)
- (India) Meitalkeishangbam Roger (TRAU)
- (India) Lallawmkima PC (Army Green)
- (India) Shem Marton Eugene (Chennai City)
- (India) Samad Ali Mallick (East Bengal)
- (Spain) Joseba Beitia (Mohun Bagan)
- (Spain) Fran Morante (Mohun Bagan)
- (Spain) Fran González (Mohun Bagan)
- (Trinidad and Tobago) Andre Ettienne (Gokulam Kerala FC)
- (Uganda) Henry Kisekka (Gokulam Kerala)
- (Uganda) Musa Mudde (Mohammedan)

== See also ==
- Rovers Cup
- I-League
