= Sheikh Sahil =

Indian footballer (born 2002)

Personal information
- Full name: Sheikh Sahil
- Date of birth: 12 November 2002 (age 23)
- Place of birth: Barrackpore, West Bengal, India
- Height: 1.75 m (5 ft 9 in)
- Position: Central midfielder

Team information
- Current team: Police AC

Youth career
- Mohun Bagan

Senior career*
Years	Team	Apps	(Gls)
2019–2020	Mohun Bagan	16	(0)
2020–2022	ATK Mohun Bagan	7	(0)
2022–2024	Jamshedpur	1	(0)
2023	→ Mohammedan (loan)	7	(0)
2023–2024	→ Aizawl (loan)	18	(0)
2024–2025	SC Bengaluru	3	(0)
2025	Inter Kashi	3	(0)
2025-	Police AC		
- * Club domestic league appearances and goals as of 12:42, 29 October 2025 (IST)

Sheikh Sahil (born 12 November 2002) is an Indian professional footballer who plays as a central midfielder for a Calcutta Football League club, Police AC.

== Club career ==
=== Mohun Bagan ===
Sahil started his career at Mohun Bagan academy. As a young player he took part various youth tournaments and leagues with Mohun Bagan. He also played in the U-16 I-League as a part of Mohun Bagan youth team. He first came on limelight in youth development league organised by IFA and Zee Bangla, though his team was the runners up in the tournament.

==== Professional career ====
In the tournament, he showed his potent and skills and as a result he was signed by the then coach Kibu Vicuna in the senior team on a four-year deal. He was a dependable man in 2019–20 season for Mohun Bagan. He won the I-League in the 2019 season for Mohun Bagan.

He was chosen by Kibu Vicuña for the 2019–20 Calcutta Football League. Sahil made his Durand Cup debut on 2 August 2019 against Mohammedan. His team won the match 2–0.

On 30 November 2019, he made his I-League debut against Aizawl as a substitute in the second half, replacing Britto PM. He made his full league debut against Gokulam on 16 December; a match that Mohun Bagan would win 2–1.

== Career statistics ==
=== Club ===
As of 11 February 2025

Club	Season	League			Cup		AFC		Total	
Club	Season	Division	Apps	Goals	Apps	Goals	Apps	Goals	Apps	Goals
ATK Mohun Bagan	2019–20	I-League	16	0	4 (Note: Appearance(s) in Durand Cup)	0	—		20	0
ATK Mohun Bagan	2020–21	Indian Super League	7	0	0	0	—		7	0
ATK Mohun Bagan	2021–22	Indian Super League	0	0	0	0	5 (Note: Appearance(s) in AFC Cup)	0	5	0
ATK Mohun Bagan	Total		7	0	0	0	5	0	12	0
Jamshedpur	2022–23	Indian Super League	1	0	0	0	—		1	0
Jamshedpur	2023–24	Indian Super League	0	0	3	0	—		3	0
Jamshedpur	Total		1	0	3	0	0	0	4	0
Mohammedan (loan)	2022–23	I-League	7	0	0	0	—		7	0
Aizawl (loan)	2023–24	I-League	18	0	0	0	—		18	0
SC Bengaluru	2024–25	I-League	3	0	0	0	—		3	0
Inter Kashi	2024–25	I-League	3	0	0	0	—		3	0
Police AC	2025	Calcutta Football League			—		—			
Career total			55	0	7	0	5	0	67	0

== Honours ==
Mohun Bagan

- I-League: 2019–20

Mohun Bagan

- Indian Super League runner-up: 2020–21

Inter Kashi

- I-League: 2024-25
