= 2019–20 I-League =

13th season of the I-League

I-League
- Season: 2019–20
- Dates: 30 November 2019 - 14 March 2020
- Champions: Mohun Bagan; 2nd I-League title 5th Indian title
- AFC Cup: Mohun Bagan
- Matches: 87 (Matches after 14 March 2020 were cancelled due to the COVID-19 pandemic)
- Goals: 187 (2.15 per match)
- Top goalscorer: Dipanda Dicka (12 goals)
- Biggest home win: NEROCA 5−0 TRAU (8 February 2020)
- Biggest away win: NEROCA 1−4 East Bengal (10 December 2019); NEROCA 0−3 Mohun Bagan (23 January 2020); Churchill Brothers 0−3 Mohun Bagan (22 February 2020)
- Highest scoring: Mohun Bagan 6−2 NEROCA (14 February 2020)
- Longest winning run: Mohun Bagan (7 games)
- Longest unbeaten run: Mohun Bagan (14 games)
- Longest winless run: Aizawl; TRAU (5 games)
- Longest losing run: TRAU; Indian Arrows; East Bengal; NEROCA (3 games)
- Highest attendance: 63,756; Mohun Bagan 2–1 East Bengal (19 January 2020)
- Lowest attendance: 150; Indian Arrows 1–1 Real Kashmir (26 January 2020)
- Total attendance: 459,885
- Average attendance: 9,017
- Season concluded with matches remaining due to the COVID-19 pandemic

The 2019–20 I-League (Officially known as Hero I-League, due to sponsorship reasons) was the 13th season of the I-League, one of the top Indian professional football leagues, since its establishment in 2007. A total of 11 teams competed in the league.

Chennai City were the defending champions, having won the previous season. TRAU joined as a promoted club from the I-League 2nd Division. Shillong Lajong were relegated from the I-League last season and will play in the second division in the 2019–20 season. 2017-18 champion Minerva Punjab played as Punjab from this season as the club was renamed on 30 October 2019.

On 18 April 2020, All India Football Federation, the organising body of the league announced Mohun Bagan as champions and decided to cancel the remaining matches due to the COVID-19 pandemic. No team was relegated, and the remaining prize money (apart from the champion's prize money) was equally divided among the 10 teams.

== Changes from last season ==
=== Promoted clubs ===
Promoted from the 2018–19 I-League 2nd Division

- TRAU

=== Relegated clubs ===
Relegated from the 2018–19 I-League

- Shillong Lajong

== Teams ==
Locations of the I-League clubs

=== Stadiums and locations ===
| Team | City/State | Stadium | Capacity |
|---|---|---|---|
| Aizawl | Aizawl, Mizoram | Rajiv Gandhi Stadium | 20,000 |
| Chennai City | Coimbatore, Tamil Nadu | Jawaharlal Nehru Stadium | 30,000 |
| Churchill Brothers | Margao, Goa | Fatorda Stadium | 20,000 |
| Gokulam Kerala | Calicut, Kerala | Kozhikode EMS Stadium | 80,000 |
| Indian Arrows | Vasco da Gama, Goa | Tilak Maidan Stadium | 5,000 |
| Indian Arrows | Mumbai, Maharashtra | Cooperage Ground | 5,000 |
| Mohun Bagan | Kalyani, West Bengal | Kalyani Stadium | 20,000 |
| Mohun Bagan | Kolkata, West Bengal | Vivekananda Yuba Bharati Krirangan | 85,000 |
| NEROCA | Imphal, Manipur | Khuman Lampak Main Stadium | 35,000 |
| Punjab | Panchkula, Chandigarh | Guru Nanak Stadium | 10,000 |
| East Bengal | Kalyani, West Bengal | Kalyani Stadium | 20,000 |
| East Bengal | Kolkata, West Bengal | Vivekananda Yuba Bharati Krirangan | 85,000 |
| Real Kashmir | Srinagar, Jammu and Kashmir | TRC Turf Ground | 15,000 |
| TRAU | Imphal, Manipur | Khuman Lampak Main Stadium | 35,000 |

=== Personnel and sponsorship ===
| Team | Head coach | Captain | Sponsor | Kit Manufacturer |
|---|---|---|---|---|
| Aizawl | (India) Stanley Rozario | (Liberia) Alfred Jaryan | NECS Limited | Vamos |
| Chennai City | (Singapore) Akbar Nawas | (Spain) Roberto Eslava | —N/a | Uhlsport |
| Churchill Brothers | (Portugal) Bernardo Tavares | (Trinidad and Tobago) Willis Plaza | Churchill | Nivia |
| Gokulam Kerala | (Spain) Fernando Santiago Varela | (Trinidad and Tobago) Marcus Joseph | Sree Gokulam; Group | Kaizen |
| Indian Arrows | (India) Shanmugam Venkatesh | (India) Vikram Pratap Singh | Hero MotoCorp | Six5Six |
| Mohun Bagan | (Spain) Kibu Vicuña | (India) Dhanachandra Singh | —N/a | Shiv Naresh |
| NEROCA | (India) Gift Raikhan | (Trinidad and Tobago) Marvin Phillip | Living 3D | Vicky Transform |
| Punjab | (India) Yan Law | (India) Sanju Pradhan | Apollo Tyres | Spartan |
| East Bengal | (Spain) Mario Rivera Campesino | (India) Lalrindika Ralte | Quess Corp | Kaizen |
| Real Kashmir | (Scotland) David Robertson | (Nigeria) Loveday Enyinnaya | J&K Bank | Adidas |
| TRAU | (India) L.Nandakumar Singh | (Nigeria) Oguchi Uche | Aciesta | Nivia |

- Note: N/A- Not Announced

=== Managerial changes ===
| Team | Outgoing manager | Manner of departure | Position in table | Incoming manager | Date of appointment |
|---|---|---|---|---|---|
| Churchill Brothers | (Romania) Petre Gigiu | Contract finished | Pre-season | (Ghana) Edward Ansah | 16 May 2019 |
| Mohun Bagan | (India) Khalid Jamil | Contract finished | Pre-season | (Spain) Kibu Vicuña | 10 May 2019 |
| Gokulam Kerala | (India) Gift Raikhan | Contract finished | Pre-season | (Spain) Fernando Andres Santiago | 1 July 2019 |
| NEROCA | (Spain) Manuel Retamero Fraile | Contract finished | Pre-season | (India) Gift Raikhan | 1 July 2019 |
| Punjab | (India) Sachin Badadhe | End of caretaker spell | Pre-season | (India) Yan Law | 1 July 2019 |
| TRAU | (India) L.Nandakumar Singh | Promoted to Technical Director | Pre-season | (Cyprus) Dimitris Dimitriou | 18 September 2019 |
| Churchill Brothers | (Ghana) Edward Ansah | Demoted to Assistant Coach | Pre-season | (Portugal) Bernardo Tavares | 28 November 2019 |
| TRAU | (Cyprus) Dimitris Dimitriou | Resigned | Pre-season | (Brazil) Douglas Silva | 29 November 2019 |
| TRAU | (Brazil) Douglas Silva | Resigned | 3rd | (India) L Nandkumar Singh | 22 December 2019 |
| TRAU | (India) L Nandkumar Singh | Moved as Technical Director | 3rd | (Cyprus) Dimitris Dimitriou | 2 January 2020 |
| East Bengal | (Spain) Alejandro Menendez | Resigned | 6th | (Spain) Mario Rivera Campesino | 23 January 2020 |
| TRAU | (Cyprus) Dimitris Dimitriou | Sacked | 3rd | — | |

=== Foreign players ===
Maximum 6 foreign players per team. Indian Arrows cannot sign any foreign players as they are the All India Football Federation developmental team.

| Team | Player 1 | Player 2 | Player 3 | Player 4 | Player 5 | Player 6 |
|---|---|---|---|---|---|---|
| Aizawl | (Argentina) Matías Verón | (Ghana) Joseph Adjei | (Liberia) Alfred Jaryan | (Mali) Abdoulaye Kanouté | (Nigeria) Justice Morgan | (Uganda) Richard Kasagga |
| Chennai City | (Japan) Katsumi Yusa | (Serbia) Jan Muzangu | (Spain) Roberto Eslava | (Spain) Adolfo Miranda | (Spain) Sandro Rodríguez | (Spain) Nauzet Santana |
| Churchill Brothers | (The Gambia) Dawda Ceesay | (Ghana) Kalif Alhassan | (Portugal) Sócrates Pedro | (Trinidad and Tobago) Radanfah Abu Bakr | (Trinidad and Tobago) Willis Plaza | (Trinidad and Tobago) Robert Primus |
| East Bengal | (Costa Rica) Jhonny Acosta | (France) Kassim Aidara | (Spain) Jaimie Santos Colado | (Spain) Marcos Jiménez Espada | (Spain) Juan Mera | (Spain) Víctor Pérez |
| Gokulam Kerala | (Afghanistan) Zohib Islam Amiri | (Rwanda) Atuheire Kipson | (Trinidad and Tobago) Andre Ettienne | (Trinidad and Tobago) Nathaniel García | (Trinidad and Tobago) Marcus Joseph | (Uganda) Henry Kisekka |
| Mohun Bagan | (Senegal) Baba Diawara | (Spain) Joseba Beitia | (Spain) Fran González | (Spain) Fran Morante | (Tajikistan) Komron Tursunov | (Trinidad and Tobago) Daneil Cyrus |
| NEROCA | (Ghana) Philip Adjah Tetteh | (Hungary) Attila Busai | (Mali) Boubacar Diarra | (Mali) Ousmane Diawara | (Trinidad and Tobago) Marvin Phillip | (Trinidad and Tobago) Taryk Sampson |
| Punjab | (Brazil) Sérgio Barboza | (Brazil) Valci Júnior | (Brazil) Danilo Quipapá | (Cameroon) Dipanda Dicka | (Nepal) Kiran Chemjong | (Nigeria) Kingsley Obumneme |
| Real Kashmir | (England) Kallum Higginbotham | (Ivory Coast) Bazie Armand | (Ivory Coast) Gnohere Krizo | (Nigeria) Loveday Enyinnaya | (Scotland) Mason Robertson | (Zambia) Aaron Katebe |
| TRAU | (Moldova) Petru Leucă | (Nigeria) Princewill Emeka | (Nigeria) Joseph Olaleye | (Nigeria) Joel Sunday | (Nigeria) Oguchi Uche | (Saint Kitts and Nevis) Gerard Williams |

== League table ==
=== Standings ===
| Pos | Team | Pld | W | D | L | GF | GA | GD | Pts | Qualification or relegation |
|---|---|---|---|---|---|---|---|---|---|---|
| 1 | Mohun Bagan (C) | 16 | 12 | 3 | 1 | 35 | 13 | +22 | 39 | Qualification for 2021 AFC Cup group stage |
| 2 | East Bengal | 16 | 6 | 5 | 5 | 23 | 18 | +5 | 23 | |
| 3 | Punjab | 16 | 5 | 8 | 3 | 23 | 21 | +2 | 23 | |
| 4 | Real Kashmir | 15 | 6 | 4 | 5 | 16 | 14 | +2 | 22 | |
| 5 | Gokulam Kerala | 15 | 6 | 4 | 5 | 20 | 19 | +1 | 22 | |
| 6 | TRAU | 17 | 6 | 4 | 7 | 17 | 27 | −10 | 22 | |
| 7 | Chennai City | 15 | 5 | 5 | 5 | 20 | 21 | −1 | 20 | |
| 8 | Churchill Brothers | 15 | 6 | 2 | 7 | 23 | 21 | +2 | 20 | |
| 9 | NEROCA | 16 | 5 | 3 | 8 | 27 | 35 | −8 | 18 | |
| 10 | Aizawl | 15 | 3 | 7 | 5 | 17 | 19 | −2 | 16 | |
| 11 | Indian Arrows | 16 | 2 | 3 | 11 | 7 | 20 | −13 | 9 | |

Source: I-league, RSSSF
Rules for classification: 1) points; 2) head-to-head points; 3) head-to-head goal difference; 4) goal difference; 5) number of goals scored; 6) drawing of lots
(C) Champions

=== Results ===
| Home \ Away | AFC | CHE | CHU | EAB | GOK | INA | MIN | MOH | NER | REK | TRU |
|---|---|---|---|---|---|---|---|---|---|---|---|
| Aizawl | — | 1–1 | 2–2 | | | | 3–3 | 0–0 | a | 0–2 | 2–0 |
| Chennai City | 1–1 | — | | 0–2 | 0–1 | 1–0 | | 2–3 | 2–2 | | 1–0 |
| Churchill Brothers | | 1–2 | — | 1–0 | | 1–2 | 3–0 | 0–3 | 4–1 | 2–1 | 1–2 |
| East Bengal | 0–1 | | 1–1 | — | 1–3 | 0–1 | 1–1 | a | | 1–1 | 2–1 |
| Gokulam Kerala | 1–1 | 2–3 | 1–0 | 1–1 | — | | | | 2–1 | 0–1 | 1–1 |
| Indian Arrows | 1–2 | | | 1–3 | 0–1 | — | | | 1–1 | 0–2 | 0–2 |
| Punjab | | 3–1 | | 1–1 | 3–1 | 1–0 | — | 1–1 | 3–2 | 1–0 | |
| Mohun Bagan | 1–0 | 1–1 | 2–4 | 2–1 | 2–1 | 1–0 | 1–0 | — | 6–2 | | 4–0 |
| NEROCA | 1–0 | | | 1–4 | 3–2 | 0–0 | | 0–3 | — | 1–0 | 5–0 |
| Real Kashmir | | 2–1 | | 0–1 | | | 1–1 | 0–2 | | — | |
| TRAU | 2–1 | 0–0 | | 2–4 | | | 0–0 | 1–3 | 2–1 | 2–2 | — |

Source: I-League
Legend: Blue = home team win; Yellow = draw; Red = away team win.

Note: Matches after 14 March 2020 were cancelled due to the COVID-19 pandemic.

== Season statistics ==
As of 10 March 2020

=== Scoring ===
==== Top scorers ====
| Rank | Player | Club | Goals |
|---|---|---|---|
| 1 | (Cameroon) Dipanda Dicka | Punjab | 12 |
| 2 | (Spain) Fran González | Mohun Bagan | 10 |
| 2 | (Senegal) Baba Diawara | Mohun Bagan | 10 |
| 4 | (Trinidad and Tobago) Willis Plaza | Churchill Brothers | 8 |
| 4 | (Ghana) Philip Adjah Tetteh | NEROCA | 8 |
| 6 | (Trinidad and Tobago) Marcus Joseph | Gokulam Kerala | 7 |
| 7 | (Spain) Marcos Jiménez Espada | East Bengal | 6 |
| 7 | (Spain) Jaimie Santos Colado | East Bengal | 6 |
| 7 | (Uganda) Henry Kisekka | Gokulam Kerala | 6 |
| 7 | (Scotland) Mason Robertson | Real Kashmir | 6 |
| 7 | (India) Rochharzela | Aizawl | 6 |
| 12 | (Japan) Katsumi Yusa | Chennai City | 5 |
| 12 | (India) Lalkhawpuimawia | Churchill Brothers | 5 |

==== Top Indian scorers ====
| Rank | Player | Club | Goals |
|---|---|---|---|
| 1 | Rochharzela | Aizawl | 6 |
| 2 | Lalkhawpuimawia | Churchill Brothers | 5 |
| 3 | Vikram Pratap Singh | Indian Arrows | 4 |
| 3 | N. Pritam Singh | NEROCA | 4 |
| 5 | Shibil Muhammed | Gokulam Kerala | 3 |
| 5 | Subha Ghosh | Mohun Bagan | 3 |
| 5 | K. Krishananda Singh | TRAU | 3 |
| 8 | William Lalnunfela | Aizawl | 2 |
| 8 | Vinil Poojary | Churchill Brothers | 2 |
| 8 | Nongdamba Naorem | Mohun Bagan | 2 |
| 8 | V.P. Suhair | Mohun Bagan | 2 |
| 8 | Makan Chote | Punjab | 2 |
| 8 | Nganbam Naocha Singh | TRAU | 2 |
| 8 | Moirangthem Givson Singh | Indian Arrows | 2 |
| 8 | Danish Farooq | Real Kashmir | 2 |
| 8 | Deepak Devrani | TRAU | 2 |
| 8 | Vinil Poojary | Churchill Brothers | 2 |

==== Hat-tricks ====
Result column shows goal tally of player's team first.

| Player | For | Against | Goals | Result | Date | Ref |
|---|---|---|---|---|---|---|
| (Cameroon) Dipanda Dicka | Punjab | NEROCA | 3 | 3−2 | 29 January 2020 | |
| (India) Ningthoujam Pritam Singh | NEROCA | TRAU | 3 | 5–0 | 8 February 2020 | |
| (Spain) Fran González | Mohun Bagan | NEROCA | 3 | 6–2 | 14 February 2020 | |

=== Cleansheets ===
| Rank | Player | Club | Clean sheets |
|---|---|---|---|
| 1 | (India) Sankar Roy | Mohun Bagan | 6 |
| 2 | (Trinidad and Tobago) Marvin Phillip | NEROCA | 4 |
| 3 | (India) Ubaid CK | Gokulam Kerala | 3 |
| 3 | (Nepal) Kiran Chemjong | Punjab | 3 |
| 5 | (India) Mithun Samanta | TRAU | 2 |
| 5 | (India) Jafar Mondal | Churchill Brothers | 2 |
| 5 | (India) Phurba Lachenpa | Real Kashmir | 2 |
| 5 | (India) Lalbiakhlua Jongte | Indian Arrows | 2 |
| 5 | (India) Zothanmawia | Aizawl | 2 |
| 5 | (India) Mirshad Michu | East Bengal | 2 |
| 5 | (Spain) Nauzet Santana | Chennai City | 2 |
| 12 | (India) Debjit Majumder | Mohun Bagan | 1 |
| 12 | (India) Lalremruata Arema | Aizawl | 1 |
| 12 | (India) Sayan Roy | TRAU | 1 |

=== Discipline ===
==== Player ====
- Most yellow cards: 5
  - (India) Gurjinder Kumar (Mohun Bagan)
  - (India) Charles Anandraj (Chennai City)
  - (India) Mohammed Irshad (Gokulam Kerala)
- Most red cards: 1
  - (India) Anwar Ali (Punjab)
  - (Trinidad and Tobago) Andre Ettienne (Gokulam Kerala)
  - (India) Gurjinder Kumar (Mohun Bagan)
  - (Ghana) Joseph Adjei (Aizawl)
  - (India) Mohamed Irshad (Gokulam Kerala)
  - (Afghanistan) Zohib Islam Amiri (Gokulam Kerala)
  - (India) Mashoor Shereef (Chennai City)
  - (Trinidad and Tobago) Radanfah Abu Bakr (Churchill Brothers)
  - (Spain) Marcos Jiménez Espada (East Bengal)
  - (India) Sandeep Singh (TRAU)
  - (India) Dhanachandra Singh (Mohun Bagan)

==== Club ====
- Most yellow cards: 24
  - Punjab
- Most red card: 3
  - Gokulam Kerala

== Attendance ==
As of 7 February 2020

| Team | GP | Cumulative | High | Low | Mean |
|---|---|---|---|---|---|
| Mohun Bagan | 5 | 112,051 | 63,756 | 8,834 | 22,410 |
| Gokulam Kerala | 5 | 85,065 | 31,184 | 10,135 | 19,040 |
| TRAU | 4 | 53,042 | 23,682 | 7,564 | 13,260 |
| NEROCA | 4 | 52,808 | 19,782 | 7,444 | 13,202 |
| East Bengal | 7 | 59,471 | 12,722 | 4,573 | 8,496 |
| Chennai City | 4 | 31,302 | 12,307 | 3,863 | 7,825 |
| Real Kashmir | 3 | 26,063 | 11,521 | 6,010 | 8,687 |
| Aizawl | 5 | 26,018 | 7,642 | 2,222 | 5,203 |
| Churchill Brothers | 5 | 15,311 | 7,525 | 1,260 | 3,062 |
| Punjab | 6 | 23,674 | 6,421 | 1,131 | 3,945 |
| Indian Arrows | 5 | 3,736 | 1,618 | 150 | 747 |
| Total | 51 | 459,885 | 63,756 | 150 | 9,017 |
| Legend | Lowest Highest | Source: | | | |

Note: Matches after 14 March 2020 were cancelled due to the COVID-19 pandemic.

== Award ==
=== Hero of the Match ===
| Match | Hero of the Match | | Match | Hero of the Match | | Match | Hero of the Match | |
| Match | Player | Club | Match | Player | Club | Match | Player | Club |
|---|---|---|---|---|---|---|---|---|
| Match 1 | (India) Lalremruata Arema | Aizawl | Match 38 | (Saint Kitts and Nevis) Gerrard Williams | TRAU | Match 75 | — | |
| Match 2 | (Trinidad and Tobago) Marcus Joseph | Gokulam Kerala | Match 39 | (Cameroon) Dipanda Dicka | Punjab | Match 76 | — | |
| Match 3 | (India) Lalkhawpuimawia | Churchill Brothers | Match 40 | (Senegal) Baba Diawara | Mohun Bagan | Match 77 | — | |
| Match 4 | (Spain) Adolfo Miranda | Chennai City | Match 41 | (India) Rochharzela | Aizawl | Match 78 | — | |
| Match 5 | (Spain) Juan Mera | East Bengal | Match 42 | (Spain) Jaime Santos Colado | East Bengal | Match 79 | — | |
| Match 6 | (Trinidad and Tobago) Marvin Phillip | NEROCA | Match 43 | (Scotland) Mason Robertson | Real Kashmir | Match 80 | — | |
| Match 7 | (India) Hormipam Ruivah | Indian Arrows | Match 44 | (Trinidad and Tobago) Marcus Joseph | Gokulam Kerala | Match 81 | — | |
| Match 8 | (Brazil) Danilo Quipapá | Punjab | Match 45 | (Cameroon) Dipanda Dicka | Punjab | Match 82 | — | |
| Match 9 | (Trinidad and Tobago) Willis Plaza | Churchill Brothers | Match 46 | (Senegal) Baba Diawara | Mohun Bagan | Match 83 | — | |
| Match 10 | (India) Samik Mitra | Indian Arrows | Match 47 | (Scotland) Mason Robertson | Real Kashmir | Match 84 | — | |
| Match 11 | (Spain) Jaime Santos | East Bengal | Match 48 | (India) Lalbiakhlua Jongte | Indian Arrows | Match 85 | — | |
| Match 12 | (Nepal) Kiran Chemjong | Punjab | Match 49 | (India) James Kithan | Churchill Brothers | Match 86 | — | |
| Match 13 | (Spain) Fran González | Mohun Bagan | Match 50 | (Trinidad and Tobago) Nathaniel García | Gokulam Kerala | Match 87 | — | |
| Match 14 | (India) Laishram Premjit Singh | TRAU | Match 51 | (India) Rochharzela | Aizawl | Match 88 | — | |
| Match 15 | (Cameroon) Dipanda Dicka | Punjab | Match 52 | (India) N. Pritam Singh | NEROCA | Match 89 | — | |
| Match 16 | (India) Sankar Roy | Mohun Bagan | Match 53 | (India) Phurba Lachenpa | Real Kashmir | Match 90 | — | |
| Match 17 | (India) William Lalnunfela | Aizawl | Match 54 | (Senegal) Baba Diawara | Mohun Bagan | Match 91 | — | |
| Match 18 | (India) Jonathan Lalrawngbawla | Aizawl | Match 55 | (India) Glan Martins | Churchill Brothers | Match 92 | — | |
| Match 19 | (India) Khaiminthang Lhungdim | NEROCA | Match 56 | (India) Lalbiakhlua Jongte | Indian Arrows | Match 93 | — | |
| Match 20 | (Scotland) Mason Robertson | Real Kashmir | Match 57 | (Mali) Abdoulaye Kanouté | Aizawl | Match 94 | — | |
| Match 21 | (India) Danish Farooq Bhat | Real Kashmir | Match 58 | (Trinidad and Tobago) Marcus Joseph | Gokulam Kerala | Match 95 | — | |
| Match 22 | (India) Givson Singh | Indian Arrows | Match 59 | (Liberia) Ansumana Kromah | East Bengal | Match 96 | — | |
| Match 23 | (India) K.Phalguni Singh | TRAU | Match 60 | (Spain) Fran González | Mohun Bagan | Match 97 | — | |
| Match 24 | (Trinidad and Tobago) Willis Plaza | Churchill Brothers | Match 61 | (Trinidad and Tobago) Willis Plaza | Churchill Brothers | Match 98 | — | |
| Match 25 | (Spain) Fran Morante | Mohun Bagan | Match 62 | (Cameroon) Dipanda Dicka | Punjab | Match 99 | — | |
| Match 26 | (Trinidad and Tobago) Marcus Joseph | Gokulam Kerala | Match 63 | (India) Sayan Roy | TRAU | Match 100 | — | |
| Match 27 | (India) Ayush Adhikari | Indian Arrows | Match 64 | (India) Lalrindika Ralte | East Bengal | Match 101 | — | |
| Match 28 | (India) Isak Vanlalruatfela | Aizawl | Match 65 | (Portugal) Sócrates Pedro | Churchill Brothers | Match 102 | — | |
| Match 29 | (India) Wahengbam Angousana Luwang | TRAU | Match 66 | (India) N. Pritam Singh | NEROCA | Match 103 | — | |
| Match 30 | (Trinidad and Tobago) Daneil Cyrus | Mohun Bagan | Match 67 | (Spain) Fran González | Mohun Bagan | Match 104 | — | |
| Match 31 | (India) Sriram Boopathi | Chennai City | Match 68 | (India) Brandon Vanlalremdika | East Bengal | Match 105 | — | |
| Match 32 | (Ivory Coast) Gnohere Krizo | Real Kashmir | Match 69 | (Japan) Katsumi Yusa | Chennai City | Match 106 | — | |
| Match 33 | (Nigeria) Princewill Emeka | TRAU | Match 70 | — | | Match 107 | — | |
| Match 34 | (Trinidad and Tobago) Marvin Phillip | NEROCA | Match 71 | — | | Match 108 | — | |
| Match 35 | (Brazil) Danilo Quipapá | Punjab | Match 72 | — | | Match 109 | — | |
| Match 36 | (Trinidad and Tobago) Marcus Joseph | Gokulam Kerala | Match 73 | — | | Match 110 | — | |
| Match 37 | (Spain) Joseba Beitia | Mohun Bagan | Match 74 | — | | Source: | | |

Note: Matches after 14 March 2020 were cancelled due to the COVID-19 pandemic.

== See also ==
- 2019–20 Indian Super League
- 2019–20 in Indian football
