= Sankar Roy =

Indian footballer

Personal information
- Date of birth: 9 May 1995 (age 31)
- Place of birth: West Bengal, India
- Height: 1.76 m (5 ft 9 1/2 in)
- Position: Goalkeeper

Team information
- Current team: Mohammedan
- Number: 1

Senior career*
Years	Team	Apps	(Gls)
2016–2017	Mohammedan	2	(0)
2017–2020	Mohun Bagan	22	(0)
2020–2022	East Bengal	6	(0)
2021	→ Hyderabad (loan)	0	(0)
2022–	Mohammedan	8	(0)
- * Club domestic league appearances and goals as of 16:35, 11 March 2023 (UTC)

Sankar Roy (Bengali: শঙ্কর রায়; born 9 May 1995) is an Indian professional footballer who plays as a goalkeeper for Mohammedan in the I-League.

== Career ==
Born in West Bengal, Sankar began his professional career playing for the Mohammedan Sporting in 2016–17 I-League 2nd Division. He then joined another Kolkata giant Mohun Bagan the following season, however, he spent the entire season being the second choice to club captain Shilton Paul. Sankar Roy got his break in the 2018-19 I-League season when Shilton got injured and Roy made his debut in the opening fixture on 27 October 2018 against Gokulam Kerala F.C. which ended in a 1–1 draw.

Sankar Roy's rise to fame came in the 2019-20 I-League season when he took over from Shilton Paul, who lost his form. Sankar Roy played a pivotal role as he made 14 appearances in the title-winning campaign where he kept 6 clean sheets, the highest among all.

=== East Bengal ===
On 5 May, East Bengal announced the signing of Sankar.

== Career statistics ==
=== Club ===
As of 11 March 2023

Club	Season	League			CFL		Cup		AFC		Total	
Club	Season	Division	Apps	Goals	Apps	Goals	Apps	Goals	Apps	Goals	Apps	Goals
Mohammedan	2016–17	I-League 2nd Division	2	0	0	0	0	0	—		2	0
Mohun Bagan	2017–18	I-League	0	0	9	0	0	0	—		9	0
Mohun Bagan	2018–19	I-League	8	0	7	0	0	0	—		15	0
Mohun Bagan	2019–20	I-League	14	0	2	0	2 (Note: Appearance(s) in Durand Cup)	0	—		18	0
Mohun Bagan	Mohun Bagan total		22	0	18	0	2	0	0	0	42	0
East Bengal	2020–21	Indian Super League	1	0	0	0	0	0	—		1	0
East Bengal	2021–22	Indian Super League	5	0	0	0	0	0	—		5	0
East Bengal	East Bengal total		6	0	0	0	0	0	0	0	6	0
Hyderabad (loan)	2020–21	Indian Super League	0	0	—		0	0	—		0	0
Mohammedan	2022–23	I-League	8	0	0	0	3	0	—		11	0
Career total			38	0	18	0	5	0	0	0	61	0

== Honours ==
Mohammedan

- Sikkim Gold Cup: 2016

Mohun Bagan

- I-League: 2019–20
- Calcutta Football League: 2018–19
