= Britto P. M. =

Indian footballer (born 1993)

Britto P.M.
Personal information
- Date of birth: 15 March 1993 (age 33)
- Place of birth: Pozhiyoor, Kerala, India
- Height: 1.74 m (5 ft 8 1/2 in)
- Position: Winger

Team information
- Current team: Calicut FC
- Number: 33

Youth career
- 2010–2011: Viva Kerala
- 2011–2012: Pune

Senior career*
Years	Team	Apps	(Gls)
2012	Quartz		
2013	Eagles Kerala		
2014–2018	Churchill Brothers	12	(1)
2018–2020	Mohun Bagan	15	(1)
2020–2021	NorthEast United	11	(0)
2021–2022	Indian Navy		
2022–2024	Rajasthan United		
2024–	Calicut FC	10	(2)
- * Club domestic league appearances and goals as of 10 November 2024

Britto P.M. (born 15 March 1993) is an Indian professional footballer who plays as a winger for Super League Kerala club Calicut FC. He also worked in the Indian Navy.

== Career ==
=== Viva Kerala ===
In 2010, Kerala's lone representatives in I-League Viva Kerala FC, Signed Britto for their youth squad from U19 Kerala Team. Then after Viva Kerala became defunct, and signed for pune fc in 2011-12 Quartz SC signed Britto along with other players.

=== Indian Navy ===
In 2014, Britto joined Indian Navy the represented Services in 2014–15, 2015–16, 2016–17 seasons of Santosh Trophy (2 times champions) and 2015 National Games of India and Durand Cup as well performed.

=== Mohun Bagan ===
In 2018, he signed for Mohun Bagan. He was also an integral part of the title winning Mohun Bagan team who won I league 2019–20.

== Career statistics ==
=== Club ===
As of 11 March 2023

Club	Season	League			Cup		AFC		Total	
Club	Season	Division	Apps	Goals	Apps	Goals	Apps	Goals	Apps	Goals
Churchill Brothers	2017–18	I-League	12	1	2 (Note: Appearance(s) in Super Cup)	0	—		14	1
Mohun Bagan	2018–19	I-League	4	1	0	0	—		4	1
Mohun Bagan	2019–20	I-League	11	0	0	0	—		11	0
Mohun Bagan	Mohun Bagan total		15	1	0	0	0	0	15	1
Indian Navy	2019		0	0	3 (Note: Appearance(s) in Durand Cup)	2	—		3	2
NorthEast United	2020–21	Indian Super League	11	0	0	0	—		11	0
Indian Navy	2021		0	0	3	0	—		3	0
Indian Navy	2022		0	0	3	0	—		3	0
Indian Navy	Indian Navy total		0	0	6	0	0	0	6	0
Rajasthan United	2022–23	I-League	14	2	0	0	—		14	2
Career total			52	4	11	2	0	0	63	6

== Honours ==
Mohun Bagan

- Calcutta Football League: 2018–19
- I league: 2019–20 Mohun Bagan A.C.

Services

- Santosh Trophy: 2015–16

Indian Armed Forces

- Santosh Trophy: 2016–17

Churchill Brothers

- Goa Pro League: 2017–18

Indian Navy

- Kerala Premier League

Calicut FC

- Super League Kerala: 2024
