= Mohamad Kdouh (footballer, born 1997) =

Lebanese footballer (born 1997)

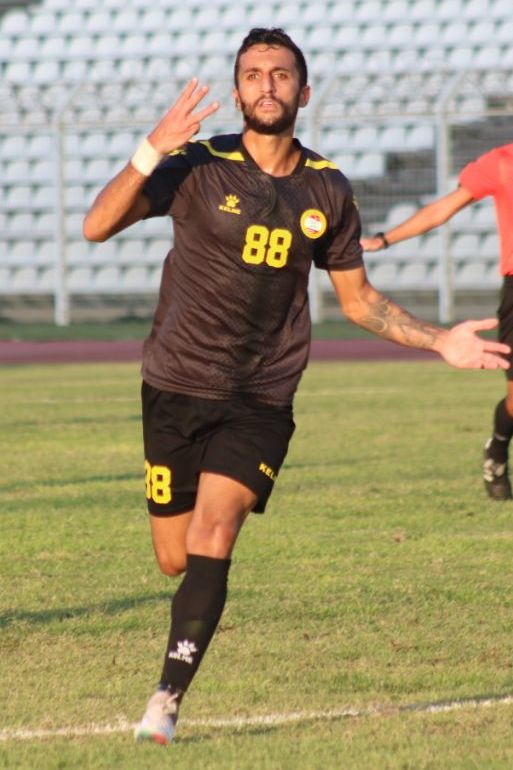
- Kdouh with Ahed in 2020

Personal information
- Full name: Mohamad Jalal Kdouh
- Date of birth: 10 July 1997 (age 29)
- Place of birth: Yaroun, Lebanon
- Height: 1.80 m (5 ft 11 in)
- Position: Forward

Team information
- Current team: Safa
- Number: 88

Youth career
- Ahed

Senior career*
Years	Team	Apps	(Gls)
2013–2023	Ahed	84	(31)
2019	→ Bashundhara Kings (loan)	0	(0)
2020	→ Al Jandal (loan)	8	(2)
2021	→ Amanat Baghdad (loan)	15	(7)
2022	→ Al-Zawraa (loan)	6	(1)
2023	→ Amanat Baghdad (loan)	11	(2)
2023–2024	Safa	26	(10)
2024	Amanat Baghdad	6	(0)
2025	Abdysh-Ata	1	(0)
2025–2026	Jwaya	10	(2)
2026	→ Safa (loan)	4	(2)
2026–	Safa	0	(0)

International career^{‡}
2015	Lebanon U19	2	(0)
2017–2019	Lebanon U23	6	(1)
2019–2023	Lebanon	27	(6)
- * Club domestic league appearances and goals as of 13 February 2026 ‡ National team caps and goals as of 31 December 2023

Mohamad Jalal Kdouh (Arabic: محمد جلال قدوح, Lebanese Arabic pronunciation: [mˈħammad ʒaleːl ʔduːħ]; born 10 July 1997) is a Lebanese footballer who plays as a forward for Lebanese Premier League club Safa. Mainly a striker, Kdouh can also play as a winger.

Coming through the youth system, Kdouh began his senior career at Ahed in 2013, winning multiple titles – most notably the 2019 AFC Cup. He was sent on loan abroad, to Bangladeshi side Bashundhara Kings in 2019, to Saudi Arabian side Al Jandal in 2020, and to Iraqi sides Amanat Baghdad and Al-Zawraa in 2021 and 2022. Kdouh moved to Safa on a permanent deal in 2023, and then returned to Amanat Baghdad in 2024.

Having represented Lebanon internationally at youth levels, Kdouh made his senior debut in the 2019 WAFF Championship, where he also scored his first goal.

== Club career ==
=== Ahed ===
==== First seasons ====
Coming through the youth academy, Kdouh made his senior debut for Lebanese Premier League side Ahed in 2013. His first goal came during the 2016–17 season, which he ended with seven goals in 17 appearances. In the following season he scored five in 12. Kdouh equaled the previous season's league goal tally in the 2018–19 season, with two more games, and scored five goals along with two assists in the 2019 AFC Cup.

==== Loan to Bashundhara Kings ====
On 19 September 2019, Bangladesh Premier League champions Bashundhara Kings announced the signing of Kdouh on a one-year loan. His first goal for the club came on 24 October 2019, scoring a brace against Chennai City in a 3–2 win in the group stage of the 2019 Sheikh Kamal International Club Cup. He scored once again the following game, against Terengganu, ending the tournament with three goals.

Kdouh scored two goals at the 2019–20 Bangladesh Federation Cup, to help his side win the title, the first in their history. He ended his stay with the Bangladeshi side with five goals in seven appearances without featuring in the league.

==== Loan to Al Jandal ====
On 27 January 2020, Kdouh was sent on a three-month loan to Saudi Second Division side Al Jandal. Kdouh's first goal came on his debut, on 31 January 2020, in a 2–1 win over Al Suqoor. Kdouh ended the season with two goals and six assists in eight games; he played five games as a striker and three as a winger.

==== Return to Ahed ====
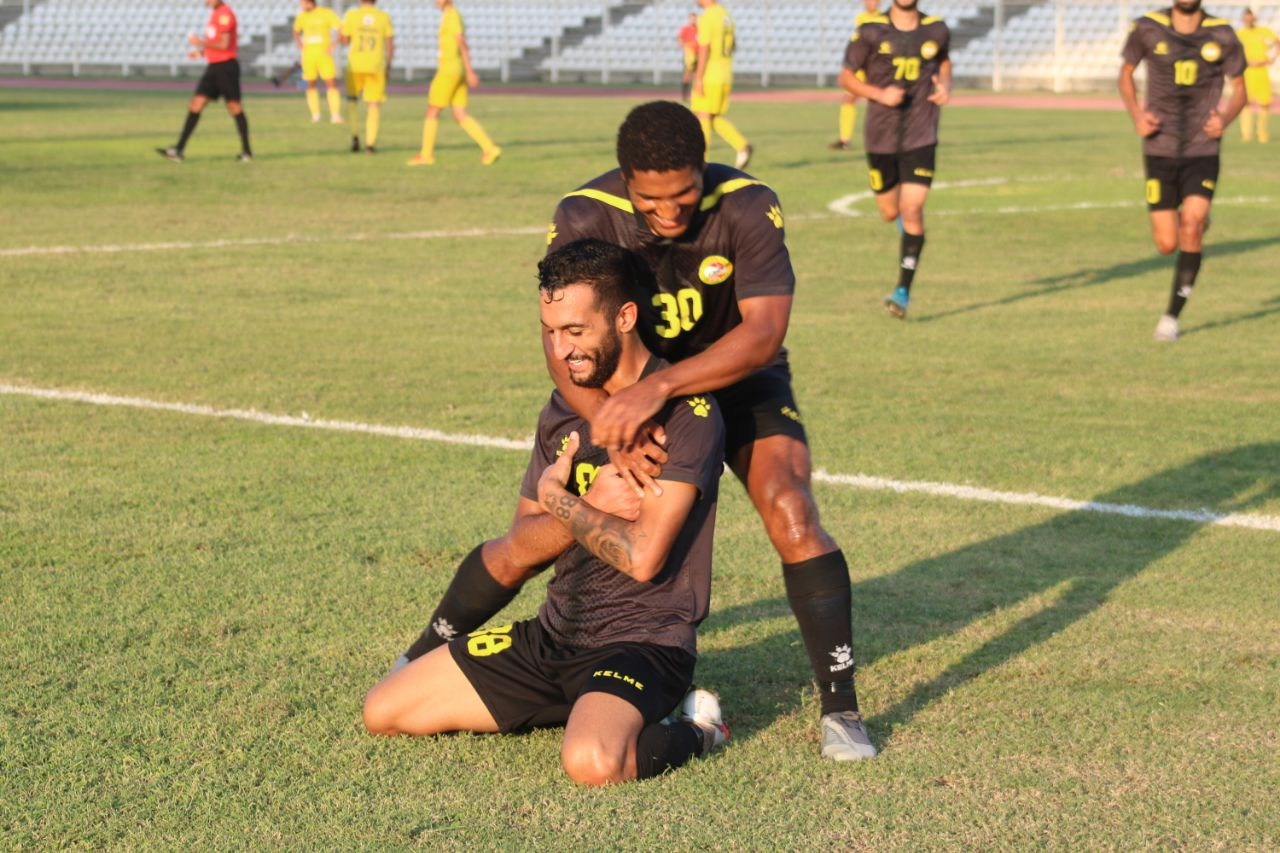
Kdouh celebrating his hat-trick with Ahed against Bourj in 2020

Upon his return from loan to Ahed, Kdouh scored a hat-trick against Bourj in the first matchday of the 2020–21 season, on 4 October 2020, to help his side win 3–2. On 18 December, he scored a brace against Salam Zgharta in a 3–0 win. Kdouh scored seven goals and made one assist in 11 games in the first leg.

==== Loan to Amanat Baghdad ====
On 11 January 2021, Kdouh joined Iraqi Premier League club Amanat Baghdad on a five-month loan, midway through the 2020–21 season. He made his debut on 5 February, in a 1–0 league defeat to Al-Najaf. Kdouh scored his first goal on 14 February, helping his team with 1–0 against Al-Karkh. He made his first assist on 24 February, in a 2–2 draw to Erbil. On 18 April, Kdouh scored a brace to help Amanat Baghdad win 2–1 against Al-Sinaat Al-Kahrabaiya. He finished his loan with seven goals in 15 league games.

==== Second return to Ahed ====
Following his loan at Amanat Baghdad, Ahed announced that Kdouh would remain in their first-team squad for the 2021–22 season. Between September and October 2021, he scored five league goals in the opening four league games, including a brace against Sagesse. Kdouh finished the first leg of the season with six goals and two assists.

==== Loans to Al-Zawraa and Amanat Baghdad ====
On 16 January 2022, Kdouh was loaned out to Al-Zawraa in the Iraqi Premier League for three months. His first goal came on 15 February, helping his side beat Al-Diwaniya 2–0 in the league. Kdouh asked for his contract to be terminated in April.

After not finding much space in Ahed's starting 11 during the 2022–23 season, due to the arrival of Scottish forward Lee Erwin, Kdouh was sent on loan to Iraqi club Amanat Baghdad for a second time on 29 January 2023 for the remainder of the season.

=== Safa ===
On 26 May 2023, Kdouh joined Safa in the Lebanese Premier League on a permanent deal. He was the team's best scorer in the 2023–24 season. However, Kdouh and Safa mutually agreed to terminate the contract at the end of the season.

=== Third return to Amanat Baghdad ===
On 30 July 2024, Kdouh returned to Amanat Baghdad for a third time ahead of the 2024–25 Iraqi Premier Division League season.

=== Abdysh-Ata ===
On 2 January 2025, Kdouh signed a one-year deal with Abdysh-Ata on a free transfer.

=== Jwaya ===
On 21 June 2025, Kdouh returned to Lebanon and joined newly promoted Lebanese Premier League club Jwaya.

=== Return to Safa ===
Following a loan to Safa in summer 2025, Kdouh joined the team permanently in August 2026.

== International career ==
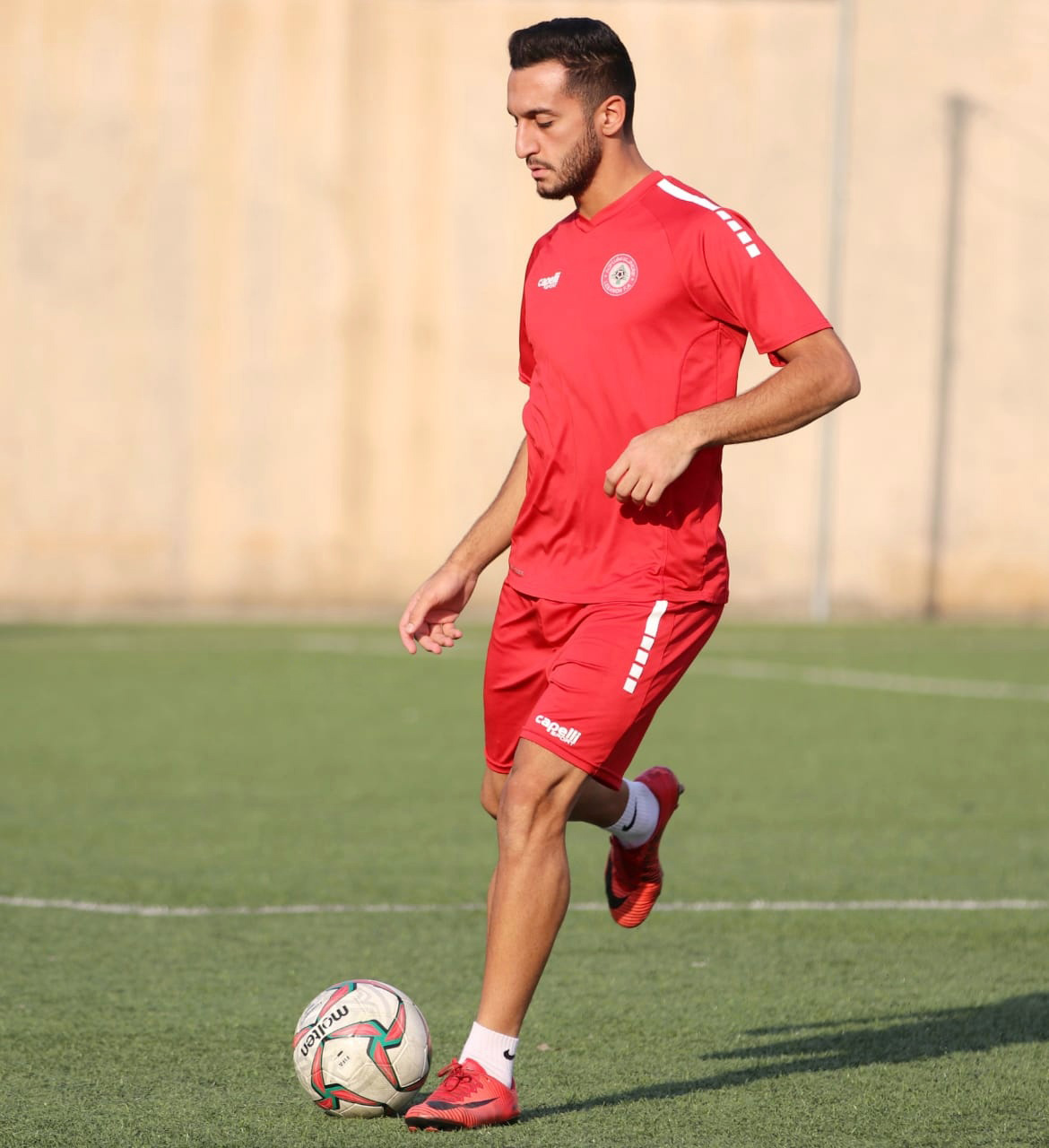
Kdouh training with the Lebanon national team in 2019

=== Youth ===
Kdouh represented the Lebanon under-19 team, playing two games at the 2016 AFC U-19 Championship qualification. He was called up to the under-23 team for the 2018 AFC U-23 Championship qualification, playing in all three games. Kdouh also served as captain in all three 2020 qualifications games, scoring against the Maldives in a 6–0 win.

=== Senior ===
Kdouh was first called up to the Lebanon national team in November 2014, as part of a mixed squad of senior and Olympic players for a friendly match against the United Arab Emirates. He made his debut for the senior team on 30 July 2019, in a 1–0 defeat against Iraq at the 2019 WAFF Championship. His first international goal came on 8 August 2019, scoring Lebanon's lone goal in a 2–1 defeat against Yemen in the same competition.

On 12 October 2021, Kdouh scored his first international brace, helping Lebanon beat Syria 3–2 in the third round of qualification for the 2022 FIFA World Cup. He was nominated Man of the Match, and Future Star of Matchday 4 for his performance.

== Career statistics ==
=== International ===
As of match played 21 November 2023

Appearances and goals by national team and year
National team	Year	Apps	Goals
Lebanon	2019	8	1
Lebanon	2020	1	1
Lebanon	2021	9	4
Lebanon	2022	6	0
Lebanon	2023	3	0
Total		27	6

Scores and results list Lebanon's goal tally first, score column indicates score after each Kdouh goal.

List of international goals scored by Mohamad Kdouh
No.	Date	Venue	Opponent	Score	Result	Competition	Ref.
1	8 August 2019	Karbala Sports City, Karbala, Iraq	Yemen	1–0	1–2	2019 WAFF Championship	
2	12 November 2020	Police Officers' Club Stadium, Dubai, United Arab Emirates	Bahrain	1–0	1–3	Friendly	
3	29 March 2021	Police Officers' Club Stadium, Dubai, United Arab Emirates	Kuwait	1–1	1–1	Friendly	
4	5 June 2021	Goyang Stadium, Goyang, South Korea	Sri Lanka	2–1	3–2	2022 FIFA World Cup qualification second round	
5	12 October 2021	King Abdullah II Stadium, Amman, Jordan	Syria	1–1	3–2	2022 FIFA World Cup qualification third round	
6	12 October 2021	King Abdullah II Stadium, Amman, Jordan	Syria	3–1	3–2	2022 FIFA World Cup qualification third round	

== Honours ==
Ahed

- AFC Cup: 2019
- Lebanese Premier League: 2016–17, 2017–18, 2018–19, 2021–22, 2022–23
- Lebanese FA Cup: 2017–18, 2018–19; runner-up: 2022–23
- Lebanese Elite Cup: 2022; runner-up: 2021
- Lebanese Super Cup: 2015, 2017, 2018, 2019

Bashundhara Kings

- Bangladesh Federation Cup: 2019–20

Individual

- Lebanese Premier League Best Young Player: 2015–16
