= Justice Morgan (footballer) =

Nigerian association footballer

Personal information
- Full name: Justice Morgan
- Date of birth: 3 October 1991 (age 35)
- Place of birth: Nigeria
- Position: Striker

Senior career*
Years	Team	Apps	(Gls)
2013–2016	Aizawl	12	(5)
2016–2017	Chennai City		
2017–2018	Go Round		
2018–2020	George Telegraph	18	(8)
2020	Aizawl	8	(0)
- * Club domestic league appearances and goals as of 11:21, 10 March 2020 (UTC)

Justice Morgan (born 3 October 1991), is a Nigerian footballer who plays as a forward.

== Club career ==
Morgan made his senior debut with Calcutta Football League side George Telegraph. In 2020, he moved to Aizawl in the I-League. On 7 February 2020, Morgan made his first assistance in the I-League, by providing Matías Verón in 76th minute of the rivalry against East Bengal.
