= Lee Tuck =

Malaysian footballer

Personal information
- Full name: Lee Andrew Tuck
- Date of birth: 30 June 1988 (age 38)
- Place of birth: Halifax, England
- Height: 1.75 m (5 ft 9 in)
- Position: Attacking midfielder

Senior career*
Years	Team	Apps	(Gls)
2007	Halifax Town		
2008–2010	Farsley Celtic		
2009	→ Guiseley (loan)		
2010	Nakhon Pathom	12	(1)
2011	Customs United	14	(6)
2011–2013	Bangkok	77	(51)
2014	Air Force Central	11	(0)
2014	→ Nakhon Ratchasima (loan)	9	(3)
2015	Nakhon Ratchasima	29	(5)
2016	Dhaka Abahani	17	(10)
2017	Negeri Sembilan	20	(5)
2018–2020	Terengganu	48	(15)
2021–2022	Sri Pahang	11	(2)
2022	→ Terengganu (loan)	3	(1)
2023	Kedah Darul Aman	15	(5)
Total		266	(104)

International career
2022–2023	Malaysia	9	(3)
Medal record
Men's football
Representing Malaysia
AFF Championship
Third place	2022
- * Club domestic league appearances and goals

Lee Andrew Tuck (born 30 June 1988) is a former professional footballer who plays as an attacking midfielder. Born in England, he represented the Malaysia national team.

== Club career ==
=== England ===
Tuck started his career with boyhood club Halifax Town in 2008. He also had spells with Bradford (Park Avenue) and Guiseley.

=== Thailand and Bangladesh ===
Tuck arrived in Thailand in 2010 after leaving Farsley Celtic, after spells also with taking up a friend's invitation to play for Nakhon Pathom. After his contract with Nakhon Pathom ended on 31 October 2010, Tuck signed a contract with Thai second division club Customs United in 2011.

Tuck played for Bangkok FC between 2011 and 2013 when he scored 51 goals in 77 league games and they narrowly missed out on promotion, finishing fourth in Tuck's last season with the club.

Tuck joined Air Force Central from Bangkok FC in 2014 and was loaned to Nakhon Ratchasima. He later moved to Nakhon Ratchasima on a permanent deal in 2015. After spending six years in Thai football, he joined Bangladeshi side Abahani Limited Dhaka, where he won the 2016 Bangladesh Football Premier League.

==== Negeri Sembilan ====
In January 2017, Tuck signed a one-year deal with Malaysia Premier League side Negeri Sembilan. On 20 January 2017, Tuck made his league debut in a 3–0 win over Sabah as first starter. His first league goal came in from a 2–1 home win against MISC-MIFA on 28 February 2017. On 11 March 2017, Tuck scored a hat-trick in 2017 Malaysia FA Cup third round match against Penang FC helping his side advance to the next round. Due his leadership qualities, he was appointed as the vice-captain of Negeri Sembilan.

=== Terengganu ===
On 16 November 2017, he signed for Terengganu after the club had been promoted to the tier 1 Malaysian league. He scored a total of 23 league goals throughout his career with the club.

=== Sri Pahang ===
On 26 November 2020, he signed with Sri Pahang.

=== Loan to Terengganu ===
In May 2021, he made a comeback to Terengganu on a six-month loan deal until the end of the 2021 season. He only featured in three league matches, scoring just one goal and an assist for the club, before returning to his parent club.

=== Kedah Darul Aman ===
In December 2022, he signed a contract with Kedah on a free transfer. However, he played until July 2023. Tuck made a statement that he is leaving the club for personal reasons.

== International career ==
Having resided for more than 5 years in Malaysia, Tuck obtained Malaysian citizenship through naturalisation.

In November 2022, Tuck earned his first call-up to the Malaysian squad for their training camp ahead of the 2022 AFF Championship. On 9 December 2022, he made his first appearance in a friendly match against Cambodia and scored his first goal in the same match. Lee's first goal in his debut wasn't enough for him as he scored the third goal against Maldives on 14 December 2022. The tally was finally added when he scored his next goal against Solomon Islands.

== International goals ==
No.	Date	Venue	Opponent	Score	Result	Competition
1.	9 December 2022	Bukit Jalil National Stadium, Kuala Lumpur, Malaysia	Cambodia	2–0	4–0	Friendly
2.	14 December 2022	Kuala Lumpur Stadium, Kuala Lumpur, Malaysia	Maldives	3–0	3–0	Friendly
3.	14 June 2023	Sultan Mizan Zainal Abidin Stadium, Terengganu, Malaysia	Solomon Islands	4–1	4–1	Friendly

== Career statistics ==
As of 14 July 2023

Appearances and goals by club, season and competition
Club	Season	League		National cup (Note: Includes Malaysia FA Cup.)		League cup (Note: Includes Malaysia Cup.)		Continental		Total	
Club	Season	Apps	Goals	Apps	Goals	Apps	Goals	Apps	Goals	Apps	Goals
Nakhon Ratchasima	2015	29	5	0	0	0	0	–		29	5
Negeri Sembilan	2017	20	5	5	3	4	1	–		29	9
Terengganu	2018	20	6	2	1	10	7	–		32	14
Terengganu	2019	17	3	3	1	3	0	–		23	4
Terengganu	2020	11	6	0	0	0	0	–		11	6
Terengganu	2021 (loan)	3	1	0	0	0	0	–		3	1
Terengganu	Total	51	16	5	2	13	7	0	0	69	25
Sri Pahang	2021	11	2	0	0	0	0	–		11	2
Sri Pahang	2022	0	0	0	0	0	0	–		0	0
Sri Pahang	Total	11	2	0	0	0	0	0	0	11	2
Kedah	2023	15	5	0	0	0	0	–		15	5
Kedah	Total	15	5	0	0	0	0	0	0	15	5
Career Total		126	33	10	5	17	8	0	0	153	46

=== International ===
As of matches played 14 June 2023.

Appearances and goals by national team and year
National team	Year	Apps	Goals
Malaysia	2022	8	2
Malaysia	2023	1	1
Total		9	3

== Honours ==
Abahani Limited Dhaka

- Bangladesh Football Premier League: 2015–16
- Bangladesh Federation Cup: 2016

Terengganu

- Sheikh Kamal International Club Cup: 2019

Individual

- Thai League 2 top scorer: 2012
- Malaysia Super League Team of the Season: 2019
- Sheikh Kamal International Club Cup Top Scorer: 2019
- Sheikh Kamal International Club Cup Best Player: 2019
