= Sócrates Pedro =

Portuguese footballer (born 1992)

Personal information
- Full name: Sócrates Emanuel Adolfo Pedro
- Date of birth: 29 August 1992 (age 34)
- Place of birth: Lisbon, Portugal
- Height: 1.80 m (5 ft 11 in)
- Position: Forward

Team information
- Current team: Churchill Brothers
- Number: 43

Youth career
- 2004–2011: Beira Mar de Almada

Senior career*
Years	Team	Apps	(Gls)
2011	Olímpico Montijo	1	(0)
2011–2012	Cova da Piedade	0	(0)
2012–2014	Oriental	25	(0)
2014–2015	Cova da Piedade	10	(1)
2015	Interclube	2	(0)
2015–2016	Tourizense	32	(6)
2016–2017	Casa Pia	29	(13)
2017–2018	Pinhalnovense	23	(4)
2018–2019	Sertanense	27	(3)
2019–2020	Lusitano	17	(4)
2020–	Churchill Brothers	9	(0)
- * Club domestic league appearances and goals as of 8 March 2020

Sócrates Emanuel Adolfo Pedro (born 29 August 1992) is a Portuguese footballer who plays as a forward for Indian club Churchill Brothers.

== Club career ==
=== Portugal and Angola ===
Born in Lisbon, Portugal, Sócrates has made into the squads of Portuguese clubs Cova Piedade, Clube Oriental Lissabon, Cova Piedade, Tourizense, Casa Pia, Pinhalnovense in Campeonato de Portugal and Angolan side Interclube in Girabola.

He has also made a couple of appearances for Lusitano in the Taça de Portugal in 2019-20 season.

Pedro made initial professional appearance with the Portuguese side Sertanense in the Campeonato de Portugal. He continued his career with another Portuguese side Lusitano and made maiden appearance for the club as well.

=== India ===
In 2020, Sócrates penned a deal with the I-League club Churchill Brothers and appeared nine times for the club before the league was stopped due to the COVID-19 pandemic in India.

== Honours ==
- Campeonato de Portugal: 2013–14 (Runners-up)
