= Salva Chamorro =

Spanish footballer (born 1990)

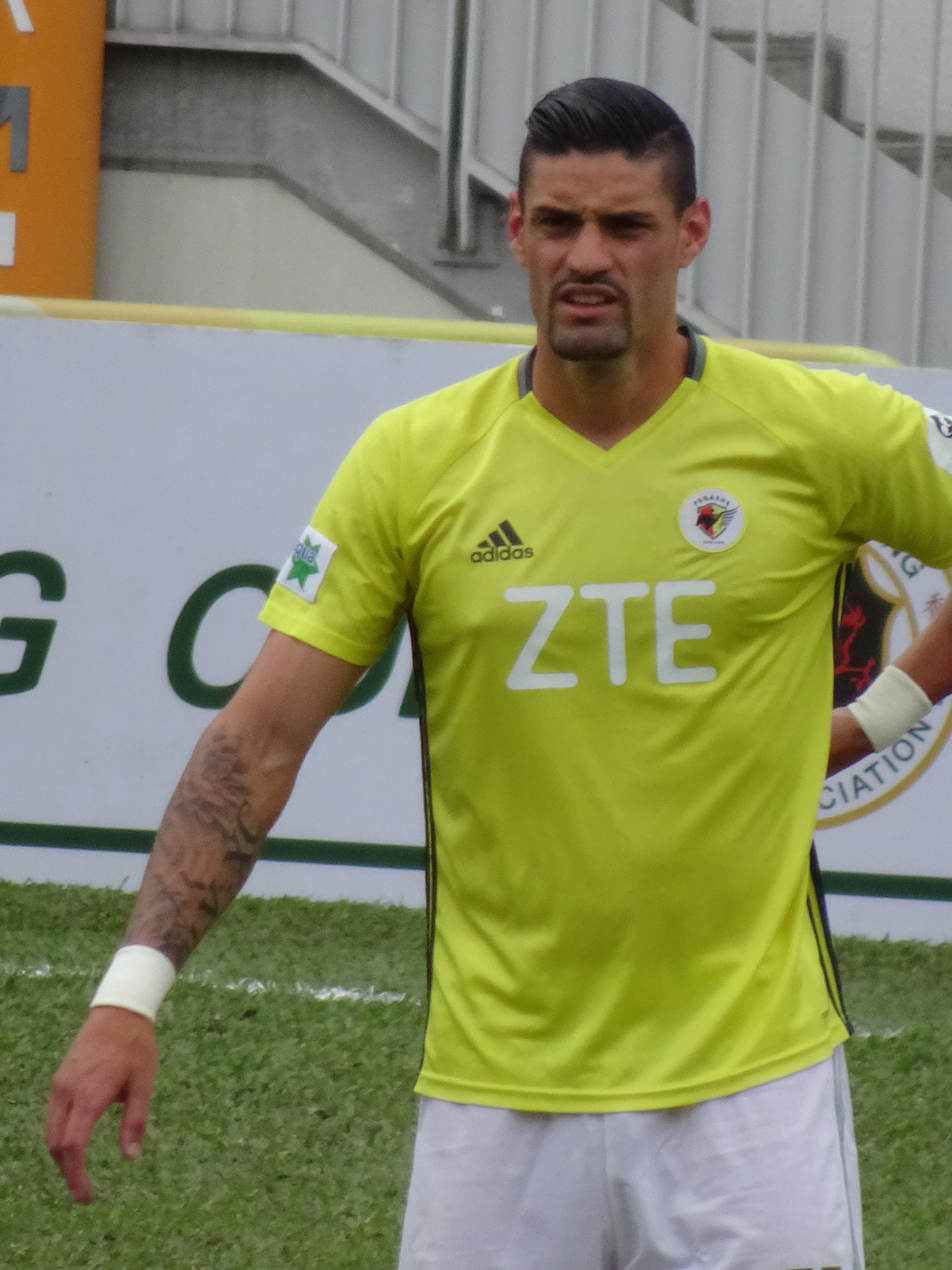

Personal information
- Full name: Salvador Pérez Martínez
- Date of birth: 8 May 1990 (age 36)
- Place of birth: Orihuela, Spain
- Height: 1.86 m (6 ft 1 in)
- Position: Striker

Youth career
- Orihuela
- 2005–2008: Villarreal

Senior career*
Years	Team	Apps	(Gls)
2008–2009	Villarreal C	39	(20)
2008–2012	Villarreal B	20	(6)
2009–2010	→ Cacereño (loan)	14	(2)
2010–2011	→ Teruel (loan)	35	(11)
2011–2012	→ Cartagena (loan)	16	(3)
2013	Atlético Baleares	18	(6)
2013–2014	Llagostera	26	(10)
2014–2015	Lleida Esportiu	36	(14)
2015–2016	Tondela	7	(1)
2016	Barcelona B	16	(1)
2016–2017	Hong Kong Pegasus	4	(3)
2017–2018	Murcia	22	(2)
2018	Logroñés	10	(2)
2018	Ittihad		
2018–2019	Doxa Drama	16	(4)
2019	Mohun Bagan	2	(0)
2020–2021	Mar Menor	8	(1)
Total		289	(86)
- * Club domestic league appearances and goals

Salvador Pérez Martínez (born 8 May 1990), known as Salva Chamorro, is a Spanish former professional footballer who played as a striker.

== Club career ==
Born in Orihuela, Valencian Community, Chamorro spent the vast majority of his career in the Spanish lower leagues, starting out at Villarreal CF B then going on to represent CP Cacereño and CD Teruel. In the summer of 2011 he signed with FC Cartagena, still on loan from Villarreal CF, making his professional debut on 27 August in a 2–0 away loss against Hércules CF and scoring his first goal in the Segunda División the following 7 January in the 2–0 home win over SD Huesca, as the season ended in relegation.

Chamorro subsequently returned to Segunda División B, where he appeared for Villarreal B, CD Atlético Baleares, UE Llagostera and Lleida Esportiu. He helped the second club to promote to the second level for the first ever in 2014, netting 11 times playoffs included.

Chamorro signed for Scottish side Hamilton Academical in July 2015, but he left after less than a month because international clearance could not be processed, joining C.D. Tondela from Portugal instead. He made his Primeira Liga debut on 27 September, coming on as an 80th-minute substitute for Dolly Menga in a 1–0 defeat at C.S. Marítimo.

In his last game, Chamorro featured only six minutes but was still able to contribute to a 2–2 away draw against league leaders Sporting CP, scoring the final equaliser from a counter-attack. After terminating his contract citing personal reasons, he returned to his country and signed with FC Barcelona B until 30 June 2017.

Chamorro moved to Hong Kong Premier League team Hong Kong Pegasus FC in summer 2016. Having appeared rarely over the course of one single season, his contract was not renewed.

Chamorro continued to switch clubs and countries in the following years, representing Real Murcia CF, UD Logroñés (both in the Spanish third tier), Ittihad Tanger (Morocco), Doxa Drama FC (Football League Greece) and Mohun Bagan AC (Indian I-League).

In January 2020, Chamorro joined Tercera División's Mar Menor FC.

== Honours ==
Llagostera

- Segunda División B: 2013–14

Mohun Bagan

- Durand Cup runner-up: 2019
