= Julen Colinas =

Spanish professional footballer

Personal information
- Full name: Julen Colinas Olaizola
- Date of birth: 16 April 1988 (age 38)
- Place of birth: San Sebastián, Spain
- Height: 1.70 m (5 ft 7 in)
- Position: Winger

Team information
- Current team: Villarrubia

Youth career
- Real Sociedad

Senior career*
Years	Team	Apps	(Gls)
2007–2013	Real Sociedad B	47	(7)
2007–2008	→ Lagun Onak (loan)	24	(6)
2008–2009	→ Beasain (loan)	25	(4)
2012–2013	→ Real Unión (loan)	23	(4)
2013–2015	Toledo	66	(8)
2015–2016	Lleida Esportiu	34	(6)
2016–2018	Cultural Leonesa	51	(11)
2018–2019	UCAM Murcia	40	(5)
2019	Mohun Bagan	3	(1)
2020–	Villarrubia	0	(0)
- * Club domestic league appearances and goals as of 24 May 2020

Julen Colinas Olaizola (born 16 April 1988) is a Spanish professional footballer who plays for Villarrubia CF as a winger.

== Club career ==
Born in San Sebastián, Gipuzkoa, Basque Country, Colinas was a Real Sociedad youth graduate. On 25 February 2007 he made his senior debut with the reserves, coming on as a second-half substitute for Borja Viguera in a 0–0 away draw against Cultural y Deportiva Leonesa in the Segunda División B.

After loan stints at Tercera División sides CD Lagun Onak and SD Beasain, Colinas started to feature more regularly for the B-side. On 28 June 2012, he moved to fellow third-tier club Real Unión on a one-year loan deal.

Colinas continued to appear in the third division in the following campaigns, representing CD Toledo, Lleida Esportiu and Cultural y Deportiva Leonesa; with the latter he achieved promotion to Segunda División as champions, contributing with eleven goals in 39 matches (play-offs included).

Colinas made his professional debut on 18 August 2017, replacing Iker Guarrotxena in a 0–2 away loss against Lorca FC. The following 12 January, he moved to UCAM Murcia CF after cutting ties with Cultu. In August 2019 he was signed by Mohun Bagan to play in the I-League on a one-year deal. On 20 December 2019 he left the club due to a ligament injury and he cannot play the remaining i league matches.

== Honours ==
Cultural Leonesa

- Segunda División B: 2016–17
