= Daneil Cyrus =

Trinidad and Tobago footballer

Daniel Cyrus
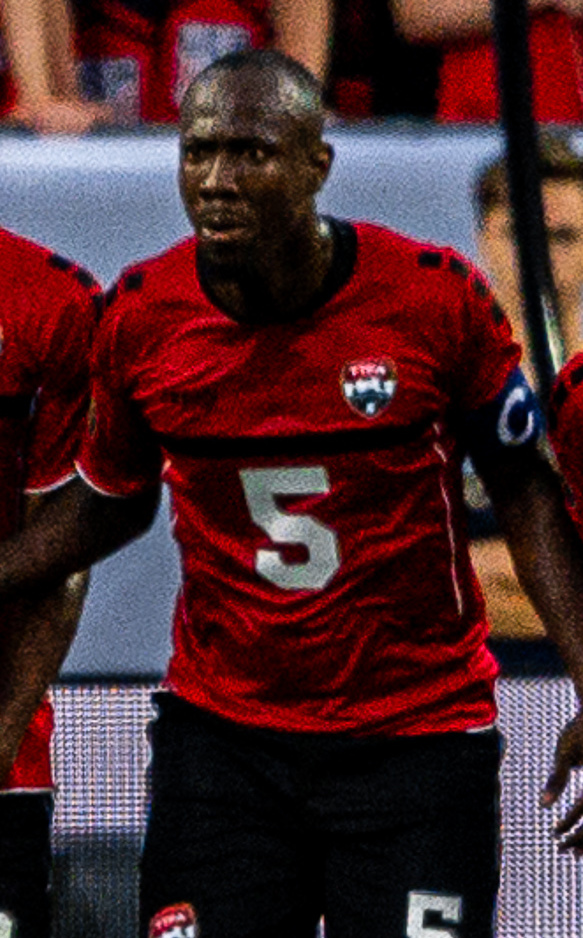
- Cyrus with Trinidad and Tobago at the 2019 CONCACAF Gold Cup

Personal information
- Full name: Daneil Nicholas Cyrus
- Date of birth: 15 December 1990 (age 35)
- Place of birth: Plymouth, Trinidad and Tobago
- Height: 1.92 m (6 ft 3 1/2 in)
- Position: Centre-back

Youth career
- 2008–2009: Stokely Vale

Senior career*
Years	Team	Apps	(Gls)
2010–2012	1. FC Santa Rosa	3	(0)
2011	→ Caledonia AIA (loan)	5	(1)
2011	→ Sporting Kansas City (loan)	2	(0)
2012–2017	W Connection	21	(0)
2014	→ Hà Nội T&T (loan)	26	(1)
2015	→ Chicago Fire (loan)	4	(0)
2017–2018	Juticalpa	29	(0)
2018–2019	Al-Orobah	31	(2)
2019–2020	Mohun Bagan	11	(1)
2020–2021	Erbil	0	(0)
2021–2022	Chainat Hornbill	21	(1)
2022	Sudeva Delhi	4	(0)

International career^{‡}
2006–2007	Trinidad and Tobago U-17	3	(0)
2009	Trinidad and Tobago U-20	3	(0)
2010–2011	Trinidad and Tobago U-23	2	(0)
2010–2019	Trinidad and Tobago	91	(0)
- * Club domestic league appearances and goals as of 15:22, 26 November 2022 (UTC) ‡ National team caps and goals as of 5 December 2019

Daneil Nicholas Cyrus (born 15 December 1990) is a Trinidadian professional footballer who plays as a defender for the Trinidad and Tobago national team.

== Club career ==
Cyrus was born in Plymouth, Trinidad and Tobago. He was waived by Sporting Kansas City in February 2012 after spending part of the 2011 season with the Major League Soccer club. In July 2012 he signed for W Connection in the TT Pro League.

In May 2014, Cyrus went on loan to V.League 1 side Hà Nội T&T.

On 6 August 2015, Chicago Fire acquired Cyrus on loan. In August 2019, he was signed by Mohun Bagan to play in the 2019–20 I-League, and clinched the league title.

In 2022, Cyrus moved back to India signing with another I-League club Sudeva Delhi ahead of the 2022–23 season.

== International career ==
Cyrus made his international debut for Trinidad and Tobago on 5 May 2010, in their 2–0 friendly defeat to Chile; he earned a total of 90 caps for his country so far.

== Honours ==
Mohun Bagan

- I-League: 2019–20

Trinidad and Tobago

- Caribbean Cup runner-up: 2014
