= Joseba Beitia =

Spanish footballer (born 1990)

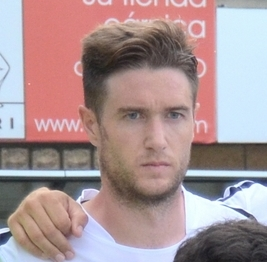
- Beitia lining up with Real Union in 2018

Personal information
- Full name: Joseba Beitia Aguirregomezcorta
- Date of birth: 29 September 1990 (age 36)
- Place of birth: Guipuzcoa, Spain
- Height: 1.82 m (6 ft 0 in)
- Position: Attacking midfielder

Youth career
- Real Sociedad

Senior career*
Years	Team	Apps	(Gls)
2010–2013	Real Sociedad	92	(4)
2013–2014	Sariñena	10	(0)
2014–2016	Somozas	67	(3)
2016–2017	Marbella	34	(2)
2017–2018	Racing Ferrol	36	(1)
2018–2019	Real Unión	21	(0)
2019–2020	Mohun Bagan	16	(3)
2020–2022	RoundGlass Punjab	33	(4)
2022–2023	Rajasthan United	11	(1)
2023	NorthEast United	5	(0)
2023–2024	Delhi	7	(2)
2024	Malappuram	9	(3)
- * Club domestic league appearances and goals

Joseba Beitia Agirregomezcorta (born 29 September 1990) is a Spanish professional footballer who plays as an attacking midfielder.

== Club career ==
In November 2020, Beitia signed with I-League club RoundGlass Punjab.

In November 2022, Beitia was part of Rajasthan United team that reached final of Baji Rout Cup in Odisha, and clinched title later, defeating Churchill Brothers.

== Career statistics ==
As of 22 April 2023

Club	Season	League			Cup		Continental					
Club	Season	Division	Apps	Goals	Apps	Goals	Apps	Goals	Apps	Goals		
Mohun Bagan	2019–20	I-League	16	3	4 (Note: Appearance(s) in Durand Cup)	1	–		20	4		
RoundGlass Punjab	2020–21	I-League	15	2	0	0	–		15	2		
RoundGlass Punjab	2021–22	I-League	18	2	0	0	–		18	2		
RoundGlass Punjab	Rajasthan United	I-League	2022–23	I-League	11	1	0	0	–		11	1
NorthEast United	2022–23	Indian Super League	5	0	4 (Note: Appearance(s) in Super Cup)	0	–		9	0		

== Honours ==
Mohun Bagan

- I-League: 2019–20

Rajasthan United

- Baji Rout Cup: 2022
