= Fran González (footballer, born 1989) =

Spanish footballer

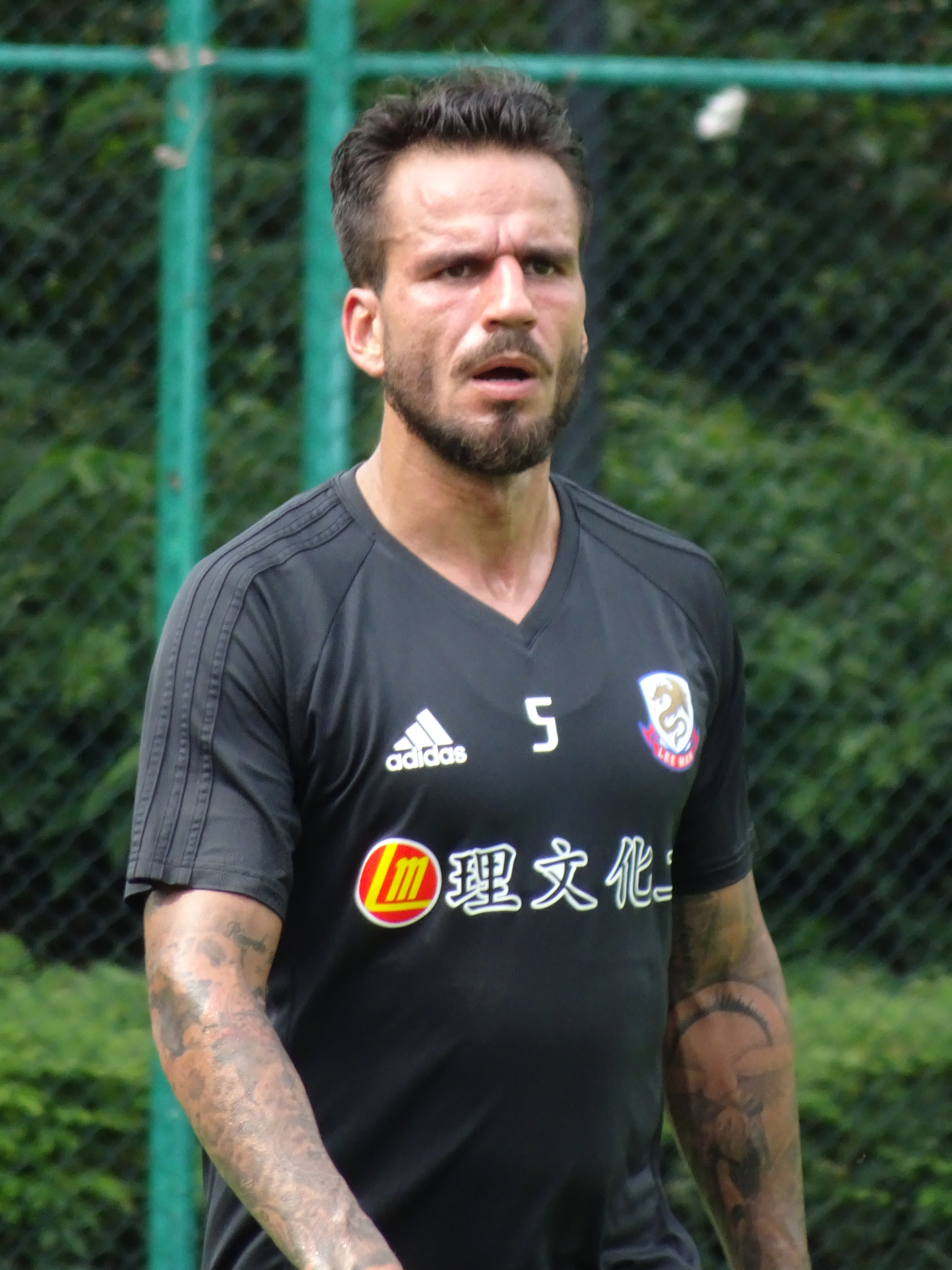
- González with Lee Man in 2018

Personal information
- Full name: Francisco Javier González Muñoz
- Date of birth: 1 February 1989 (age 37)
- Place of birth: Córdoba, Spain
- Height: 1.82 m (5 ft 11 1/2 in)
- Positions: Centre-back; defensive midfielder

Team information
- Current team: Montilla

Youth career
- Séneca
- Real Madrid

Senior career*
Years	Team	Apps	(Gls)
2008–2009	Almería	10	(1)
2009–2010	Estepona	0	(0)
2010	Lucena	16	(2)
2010–2011	Deportivo	25	(3)
2011–2012	Lucena	13	(0)
2012–2013	Zaragoza	46	(4)
2013	Zaragoza	0	(0)
2013–2014	Córdoba	34	(2)
2014–2015	Hércules	29	(3)
2015–2016	Ermis Aradippou	34	(3)
2016	Pattaya United	10	(1)
2016–2018	Bytovia Bytów	44	(3)
2018–2019	Lee Man	18	(1)
2019–2020	Mohun Bagan	16	(10)
2020–2021	Bengaluru	18	(1)
2021–2022	Real Kashmir	7	(0)
2022–2023	Terrassa	9	(0)
2023	Unión Puerto	20	(6)
2024–2025	Atlético Porcuna	25	(0)
2025	Atlético Espeleño	11	(2)
2025–	Montilla	24	(2)
- * Club domestic league appearances and goals as of 19 April 2026

Francisco 'Fran' Javier González Muñoz (born 1 February 1989) is a Spanish professional footballer who plays as a defender or defensive midfielder for Montilla CF.

== Football career ==
Born in Córdoba, Andalusia, González made his senior debuts in the 2008–09 season with UD Almería B, in Tercera División. In the following seasons he competed in Segunda División B, representing Lucena CF (two stints), Deportivo de La Coruña B and Real Zaragoza B. With the latter he also appeared with the first team on 23 January 2013, starting and being sent off in a 0–4 away loss against Sevilla FC for the season's Copa del Rey.

González signed with another reserve team in August 2013, Córdoba CF B. On 21 July 2014 he moved to Hércules CF, freshly relegated to the third level. González signed contract with the Polish team Bytovia Bytów on 21 February 2017.

On 9 July 2018, Hong Kong Premier League club Lee Man announced via Facebook that they had signed Gonzalez. On 9 August 2018, he was named as the captain of the club, following the departure of Chiu Chun Kit. On 27 April 2019, he scored the winning goal for Lee Man in the Sapling Cup Final against Yuen Long. Lee Man won by 3–2 after extra time capturing the first trophy in club history.

On 6 July 2019, he announced his contract rescission with Lee Man to join Mohun Bagan. He has been a fans' favourite in Mohun Bagan and was given the name 'Boss' by the Mariners. On 14 February 2020, he scored a hat-trick against NEROCA in the I League. He scored 10 goals for Mohun Bagan, making him the 2nd highest joint goalscorer of 2019-20 I-League along with his teammate, Baba Diawara. With 10 goals and 1 assist in 16 games of the season, he was a vital part of Mohun Bagan's 5th national football league title(2nd I League title) campaign.

On 18 October 2020, González announced his departure from Mohun Bagan. On 2020 October 2020, Bengaluru FC signed González for 2020–21 Indian Super League season. On 1 March 2021, González was released by Bengaluru FC after club's poor campaign.

In November 2021, he moved to another I-League side Real Kashmir FC and made his debut and scored a goal for the club in a 3–0 win over Indian Arrows at the 2021 IFA Shield. He also scored in the final of the tournament and won the trophy.

== Career statistics ==
=== Club ===
As of 25 April 2022

Club	Season	League			Cup		Other		Total	
Club	Season	Division	Apps	Goals	Apps	Goals	Apps	Goals	Apps	Goals
Lucena	2009–10	Segunda División B	16	2	0	0	—		16	2
Deportivo B	2010–11	Segunda División B	25	3	—		—		22	3
Lucena	2011–12	Segunda División B	13	0	0	0	—		13	0
Zaragoza B	2011–12	Segunda División B	14	1	—		2 (Note: Appearances in Relegation Play-offs)	1	16	2
Zaragoza B	2012–13	Segunda División B	32	3	—		1	0	33	3
Zaragoza B	Total		46	4	—		3	1	49	5
Zaragoza	2012–13	La Liga	0	0	1	0	—		1	0
Córdoba B	2013–14	Segunda División B	34	2	0	0	—		34	2
Hércules	2014–15	Segunda División B	25	2	0	0	3 (Note: Appearances in Promotion Play-offs)	1	28	3
Ermis Aradippou	2015–16	Cypriot First Division	34	3	1	0	—		35	3
Pattaya United	2016	Thai League 1	10	1	0	0	—		10	1
Bytovia Bytów	2016–17	I liga	14	0	2	1	—		16	1
Bytovia Bytów	2017–18	I liga	30	3	5	0	—		35	3
Bytovia Bytów	Total		44	3	7	1	—		51	4
Lee Man	2018–19	Hong Kong Premier League	18	1	1	0	—		19	1
Mohun Bagan	2019–20	I-League	16	10	4 (Note: Appearance(s) in Durand Cup)	1	—		20	11
Bengaluru	2020–21	Indian Super League	18	1	0	0	—		18	1
Real Kashmir	2021–22	I-League	7	0	6 (Note: Appearance(s) in IFA Shield)	2	—		13	2
Terrassa	2022–23	Segunda Federación	0	0	0	0	—		0	0
Career total			306	32	20	4	6	2	332	38

== Honours ==
Lee Man

- Hong Kong Sapling Cup: 2018–19

Mohun Bagan

- I-League: 2019–20

Real Kashmir

- IFA Shield: 2021
