= Suhair Vadakkepeedika =

Indian footballer (born 1992)

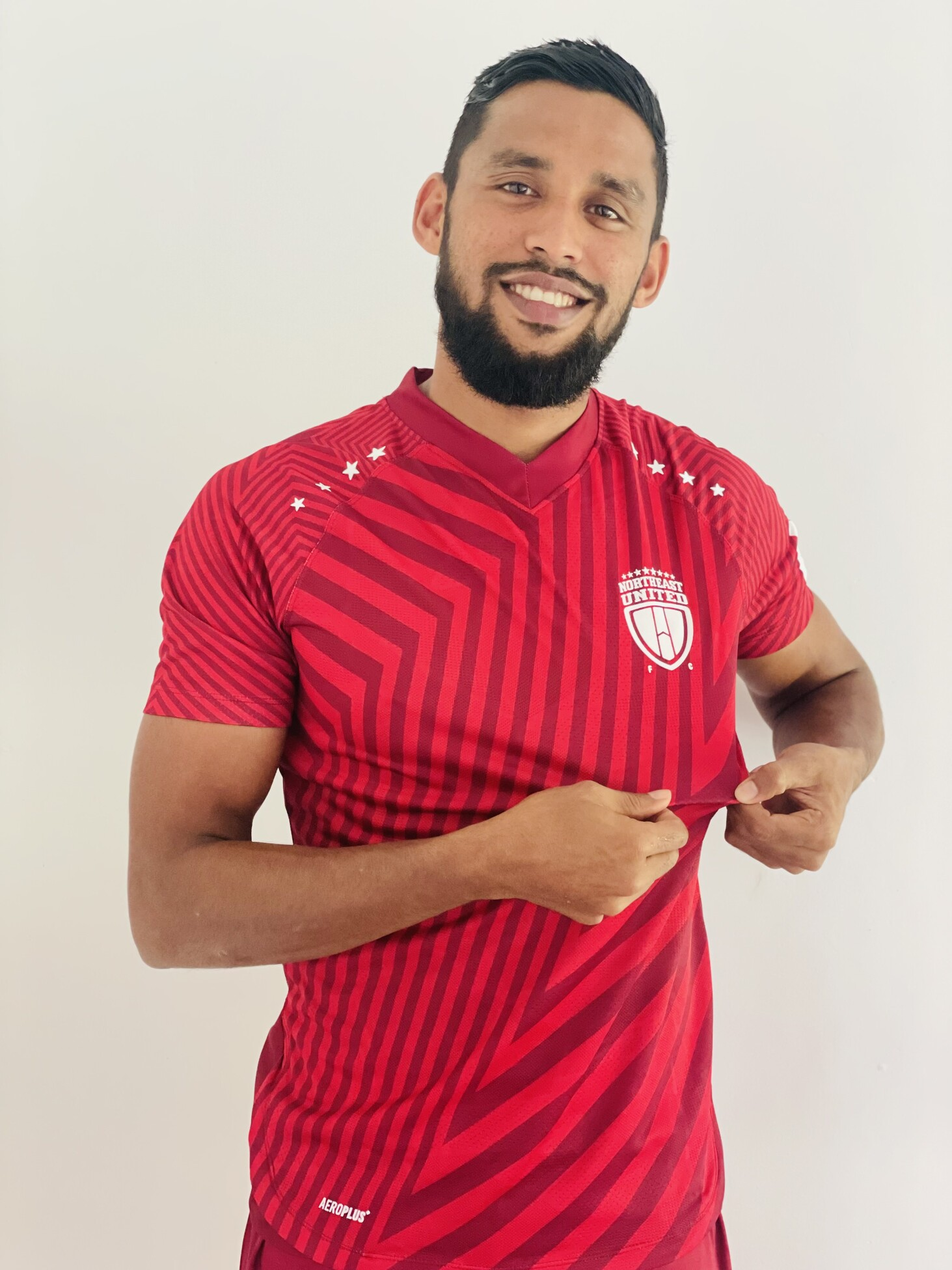
- Suhair with NorthEast United in 2021

Personal information
- Full name: Suhair Vadakkepeedika
- Date of birth: 27 July 1992 (age 34)
- Place of birth: Mannarkkad, Kerala, India
- Height: 1.75 m (5 ft 9 in)
- Positions: Left winger; striker

Team information
- Current team: Odisha

Youth career
- 2014: Kerala
- 2015: United SC
- 2015: Ernad Stallions

Senior career*
Years	Team	Apps	(Gls)
2016	United SC	10	(5)
2016–2017	Gokulam Kerala	1	(0)
2016–2017	Gokulam Kerala B	6	(5)
2017–2018	East Bengal	5	(5)
2018–2019	→ Gokulam Kerala (loan)	18	(1)
2019–2020	Mohun Bagan	16	(2)
2020–2022	NorthEast United	38	(7)
2022–2024	East Bengal	26	(2)
2024–2025	Gokulam Kerala	17	(0)
2025	Jamshedpur	0	(0)
2026–	Odisha	6	(1)

International career^{‡}
2022–	India	2	(0)
- * Club domestic league appearances and goals as of 19:22, 10 April 2026 (UTC) ‡ National team caps and goals as of 19:30, 23 March 2022 (UTC)

Suhair Vadakkepeedika (born 27 July 1992), commonly known as VP Suhair, is an Indian professional footballer who plays as a forward for Indian Super League club Odisha.

== Early life ==
Suhair was born on 27 July 1992 in Edathanattukara, Palakkad, Kerala. He is a product of United SC. He started his career playing for Calicut University and local clubs in Kerala. He also represented the Kerala football team in the National Games and the Santosh Trophy. Later he joined Kolkata outfit United SC and played in the Calcutta Football League.

== Club career ==
=== I-League clubs ===
East Bengal signed him in December 2016. He scored a hat-trick in his first match against Rainbow AC. He suffered an ankle injury on the eve of East Bengal's season opener against Shillong. He ended the season without playing a single match and finally the club released him. Later, he joined Gokulam Kerala in March 2018.

On 3 June 2019, Suhair joined Mohun Bagan.

=== NorthEast United ===
On 30 September 2020, Suhair penned down a two–year deal with NorthEast United. Suhair scored 3 goals in 19 appearances for the Highlanders in 2020–21 Indian Super League season.

On 20 November 2021, Suhair scored his first goal in 2021–22 Season in a 1–2 lost against Chennaiyin. He scored his second goal of the season against SC East Bengal. On 21 December 2021, he opened the scoring just 1 min 42 seconds into the match, the fastest goal in NorthEast United history. In the end of the 2021–22 season Suhair scored four goals and provides two assists for the Highlanders.

== International career ==
In March 2022, Suhair was called up for the national squad by coach Igor Štimac ahead of India's two friendly matches against Bahrain and Belarus.

== Career statistics ==
=== Club ===
As of 25 February 2023

Club	Season	League			State league		Cup		Others		AFC		Total	
Club	Season	Division	Apps	Goals	Apps	Goals	Apps	Goals	Apps	Goals	Apps	Goals	Apps	Goals
United SC	2016	Calcutta Football League	–		10	5	–		–		–		10	5
Gokulam Kerala	2016–17	I-League	7	5	–		–		–		–		7	5
East Bengal	2017–18	I-League	0	0	5	5	–		–		–		5	5
Gokulam Kerala (loan)	2018–19	I-League	18	1	–		–		–		–		18	1
Mohun Bagan	2019–20	I-League	16	2	11	3	5 (Note: Appearances in the Durand Cup)	2	4 (Note: Appearance in the Sheikh Kamal International Club Cup)	1	–		36	8
NorthEast United	2020–21	Indian Super League	19	3	–		–		–		–		19	3
NorthEast United	2021–22	Indian Super League	19	4	–		–		–		–		19	4
NorthEast United	Total		38	7	–		–		–		–		38	7
East Bengal	2022–23	Indian Super League	18	2	–		2	0	–		–		20	2
Career total			97	17	26	13	7	2	4	1	0	0	134	34
