= Fran Morante =

Spanish footballer

Personal information
- Full name: Francisco Morante Martínez
- Date of birth: 28 June 1992 (age 34)
- Place of birth: Córdoba, Spain
- Height: 1.82 m (6 ft 0 in)
- Position: Defender

Team information
- Current team: Linares Deportivo
- Number: 4

Youth career
- Córdoba U19

Senior career*
| Years | Team | Apps | (Gls) |
| 2011–2012 | Córdoba B | ? | (?) |
| 2012–2013 | Granada B | 71 | (4) |
| 2016–2017 | Real Murcia | 22 | (2) |
| 2017–2018 | Badajoz | 18 | (1) |
| 2018–2019 | Salamanca | 0 | (0) |
| 2019 | Internacional Madrid | 28 | (2) |
| 2019–2020 | Mohun Bagan | 33 | (2) |
| 2020– | Linares Deportivo | 8 | (0) |
- * Club domestic league appearances and goals as of 21 March 2021

Francisco Morante Martínez (born 28 June 1992) is a Spanish footballer who plays for Spanish club Linares Deportivo as a defender.
